= List of auxiliaries of the United States Navy =

Ships of the United States Navy

Ships in current service
- Current ships

Ships grouped alphabetically
- A–B; C; D–F; G–H; I–K; L; M; N–O; P; Q–R; S; T–V; W–Z

Ships grouped by type
- Aircraft carriers; Airships; Amphibious warfare ships; Auxiliaries; Battlecruisers; Battleships; Cruisers; Destroyers; Destroyer escorts; Destroyer leaders; Escort carriers; Frigates; Hospital ships; Littoral combat ships; Mine warfare vessels; Monitors; Oilers; Patrol vessels; Registered civilian vessels; Sailing frigates; Steam frigates; Steam gunboats; Ships of the line; Sloops of war; Submarines; Torpedo boats; Torpedo retrievers; Unclassified miscellaneous; Yard and district craft

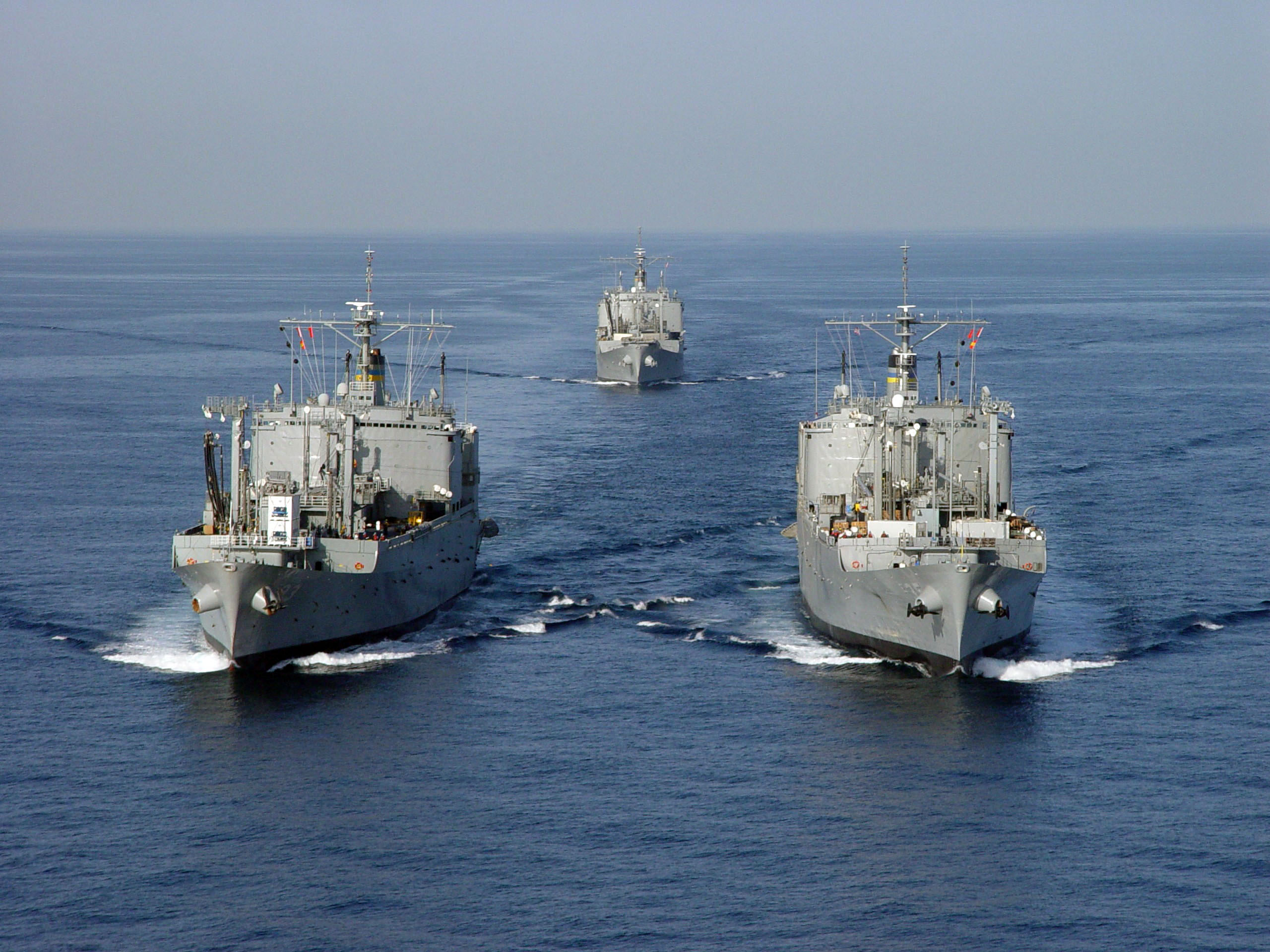
USS Shasta (AE-33, left), USS Kiska (AE-35, right), USS Flint (AE-32, rear) in 2005

This is a list of auxiliaries of the United States Navy. It covers the various types of ships that support the frontline combat vessels of the United States Navy.

Auxiliary ships which function as hospital ships and as oilers are to be found in their own articles: List of United States Navy hospital ships and List of United States Navy oilers. Escort carriers, amphibious warfare vessels, and some mine warfare vessels were also originally classed as auxiliaries but were later given their own hull classification symbols outside the auxiliary series (which all begin with an 'A'). Links to these and other list articles of similar ships can be found throughout this article.

Yard and district craft also function as auxiliaries but generally are smaller and less capable than their ocean-going counterparts, and so they generally remain in harbors and coastal areas. Their hull classification symbols begin with a 'Y'.

Ship status is indicated as either currently active [A], ready reserve [R], inactive [I], or precommissioning [P] (though United States Naval Ships - USNS - are not commissioned). Ships in the inactive category include only ships in the inactive reserve, ships which have been disposed from US service have no listed status. Ships in the precommissioning category include ships under construction or on order.

Listed ship classes will often state 'MA type' or 'MC type'. The difference is that 'MC Type' refers to ships designed by the United States Maritime Commission aka MarCom, while 'MA Type' refers to ships designed or converted under MarCom's successor agency, the United States Maritime Administration or MarAd. They are in fact the same designs, and the year 1950 is the date at which MarAd succeeded MarCom.

== Historical overview ==
Prior to the creation of the auxiliary hull classification system, ships that performed such tasks had no symbol or code to identify them, only informal designations such as Fleet Collier No. 1.

=== World War I ===
During World War I the Navy created the Section patrol (SP) and identification number (ID) system to register civilian vessels for naval acquisition. The ID series can be considered a forerunner of the current auxiliary hull numbering system, and some ships with ID numbers were later given 'A' hull symbols.

Also during WWI a series of mass-produced ships were designed by the Emergency Fleet Corporation, but few were completed before the end of the war and even fewer became naval auxiliaries.

=== Pre-World War II ===
Until World War II the US auxiliary fleet was notable for being composed of non-standard ships which had been purchased ad-hoc. Very few were designed specifically for their intended role.

Interesting examples from the 1920s of rare early auxiliaries deliberately designed for their roles include the destroyer tenders USS Dobbin (AD-3) and USS Whitney (AD-4), the repair ship USS Medusa (AR-1), and the submarine tender USS Holland (AS-3): these 4 ships had the same length hulls and similar superstructures, so they were likely of the same basic design.

In the late 1930s the Navy began the construction of 22 large tenders and repair ships to a new basic design: all were nearly identical in hull form, power plant, and superstructure (but the seaplane tenders had a large hangar that the others lacked):

- 5 destroyer tenders (AD)s of the Dixie-class
- 4 repair ships (AR)s of the Vulcan-class
- 7 submarine tenders (AS)s of the Fulton-class
- 2 seaplane tenders (AV)s of the Curtiss-class
- 4 seaplane tenders (AV)s of the slightly longer Currituck class

The last of these 22 ships (the submarine tender Sperry) was scrapped in 2011.

Also at this time the Navy began the construction of 4 large net layers (AN)s and 3 minelayers (CM)s to a different basic design, but changing requirements resulted in all but one minelayer being redesignated as transports (AP)s and then converted into Landing ships, vehicle (LSV)s. (Note: These ships were USS Monitor (AN-1), USS Montauk (AN-2), USS Osage (AN-3), USS Saugus (AN-4), USS Terror (CM-5), USS Catskill (CM-6), and USS Ozark (CM-7); only Terror was not converted to an LSV)

=== World War II ===
During the naval build-up for World War II over 700 vessels of Maritime Commission (MarCom, later MarAd) standard designs were converted to US Navy auxiliaries, (Note: MarCom ships converted to escort carriers, oilers, and amphibious warfare ships are not included in these counts, even if they had 'A' hull symbols. If a ship had multiple 'A' symbols, it is counted only under the last assigned) as were a few Landing Ships Medium (LSM)s:

- 58 Type B barracks barges: all APL
- 83 Type C1 ships: 2 AE, 3 AG, (Note: AG-169, AG-171, AG-175 were Type C1 ships) 2 AGOR, 2 AGP, 3 AH, 61 AK, 2 AP, 4 APC, 1 ARG, 3 AVS
- 59 Type C2 ships: 15 AE, 3 AF, 22 AK, 5 AKS, 13 AP, 1 AVS
- 63 Type C3 ships: 12 AD, 29 AP, 5 AR, 11 AS, 6 AV
- 42 Type C4 ships: 6 AH, 2 AK, 34 AP
- 107 Type EC2 Liberty ships: 63 AK, 4 AKN, 17 AKS, 5 AR, 14 ARG, 2 ARV, 2 AVS
- 2 Type ET1 Liberty ships: both AW
- 26 Type R ships: all AF
- 88 Type S3 ships (most LSTs): 14 AGP, 5 AKS, 7 APB, 1 APL, 13 ARB, 2 ARC, 39 ARL, 3 ARST, 2 ARVA, 2 ARVE
- 76 T1 tankers: all AOG
- 4 T2 tankers: 1 AG, 1 AOG, 2 AW
- 79 Type V ships: all AT
- 34 Type VC2 Victory ships: 3 AG, (Note: AG-172, AG-173, AG-174 were Type VC2 Victory ships) 29 AK, 2 AKS
- 4 LSMs: all ARSD

=== Post World War II ===
During the Cold War over 100 United States Maritime Administration (MarAd) standard designs were converted to US Navy auxiliaries: (Note: Escort carriers converted to Aircraft Transports (AKV)s are counted here)

- 8 Type C1 ships: 1 AF, 5 AGM, (Note: AGM-13 through AGM-18 were all Type C1 ships (AGM-16 converted to AGS)) 2 AGS (Note: AGS-35, AGS-36 were Type C1 ships)
- 3 Type C2 ship: 2 AE, 1 AG (Note: AG-178 was a Type C2 ship)
- 4 Type C3 ships / CVEs: all AKV
- 4 Type C4 ships: 1 AG, (Note: AG-153 was a Type C4 ship) 3 AGM (Note: AGM-9, AGM-10, AGM-23 were Type C4 ships)
- 8 Type C5 ships: 3 ACS, 3 AK, 2 AVB
- 7 Type C6 ships: all ACS
- 7 Type C7 ships: 3 AK, 4 AKR
- 20 Type EC2 Liberty ships: 1 AGM, (Note: AGM-12 was a Type EC2 Liberty ship) 16 AGR, 3 AGTR
- 2 Type R ships: both AF
- 2 Type S3 ships (LSTs): 1 AG, (Note: AG-157 was an LST) 1 AVB
- 17 Type S4 ships: 2 AGS, 13 AKV, 2 ARC
- 3 T2 tankers: all AGM (Note: AGM-19, AGM-20, AGM-21 were converted T2 tankers)
- 19 T3 tankers / CVEs: all AKV
- 31 Type VC2 Victory ships: 11 AG, (Note: AG-164 was a Type VC2 Victory ship; 10 more were to have been converted to depot ships for use in Vietnam, they were given hull numbers AG-179 through AG-189, but the conversions were cancelled) 4 AF, 8 AGM, (Note: AGM-1, AGM-3 through AGM-8, AGM-11, AGM-22 were Type VC2 Victory ships) 4 AGS, (Note: The Bowditch-class and AGS-37 were Type VC2 Victory ships) 2 AGTR, 2 AKV
- 2 LSMs: 1 AG, (Note: E-AG-398 was an LSM) 1 ARC

Modern auxiliaries have been designed to reduce operating costs by introducing scales of economies with larger ships and by reducing manning requirements (a trend begun in 1949 with the introduction of manning non-commissioned ships with civilian crews under the Military Sealift Command and its predecessors - such ships carry the 'T-' prefix on their hull symbols and the USNS prefix rather than USS; ships with MV or SS prefixes are under long-term charter with the Navy rather than under Navy ownership).

== Crane ships (AB) ==
- USS Kearsarge (AB-1), ex-BB-5

== Colliers (AC) ==
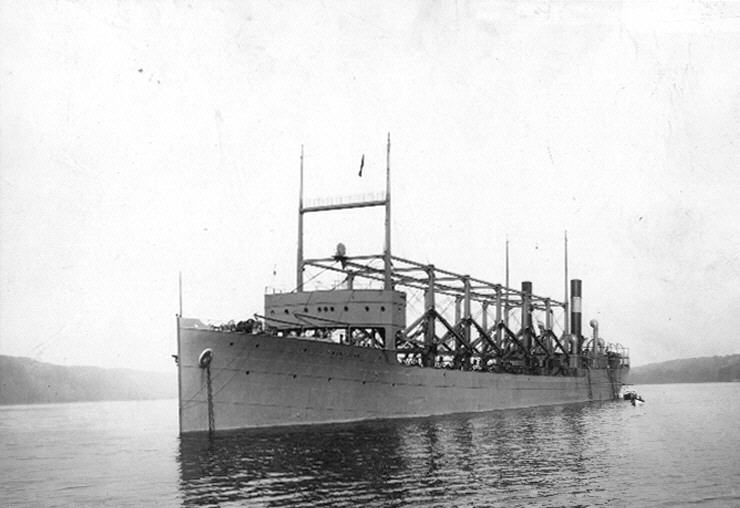
USS Cyclops (AC-4)

- USS Hannibal (1898), later AG-1
- USS Justin (1898)
- USS Leonidas (1898)
- USS Marcellus (1879)
- USS Merrimac (1898)
- USS Quincy (1918)
- USS Saturn (1898), later AG-4
- USS Southery (1898)
- USS Sterling (1898)
- USS Vestal (AC-1), later AR-4
- USS Ontario (AC-2), later AR-3
- USS Jupiter (AC-3), later CV-1 as Langley, AV-3
- USS Cyclops (AC-4), lost March 1918, 306 killed
- USS Vulcan (AC-5)
- USS Mars (AC-6)
- USS Hector (AC-7)
- USS Neptune (AC-8)
- USS Proteus (AC-9)
- USS Nereus (AC-10)
- USS Orion (AC-11)
- USS Jason (AC-12), later AV-2
- USS Abarenda (AC-13), later AG-14
- USS Ajax (AC-14), later AG-15
- USS Brutus (AC-15)
- USS Caesar (AC-16)
- USS Nero (AC-17)

== Auxiliary crane ships (T-ACS) ==
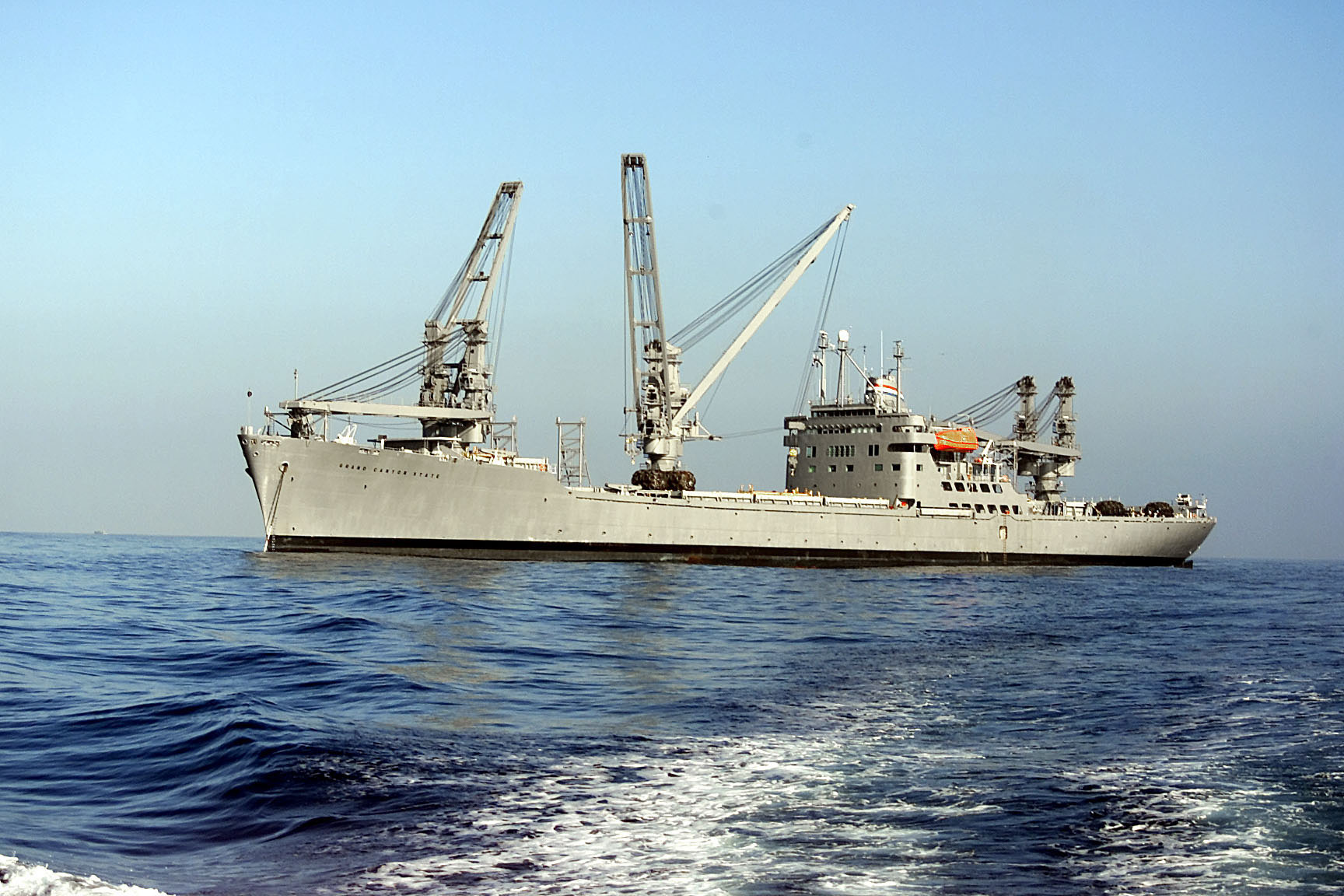
SS Grand Canyon State (T-ACS-3)

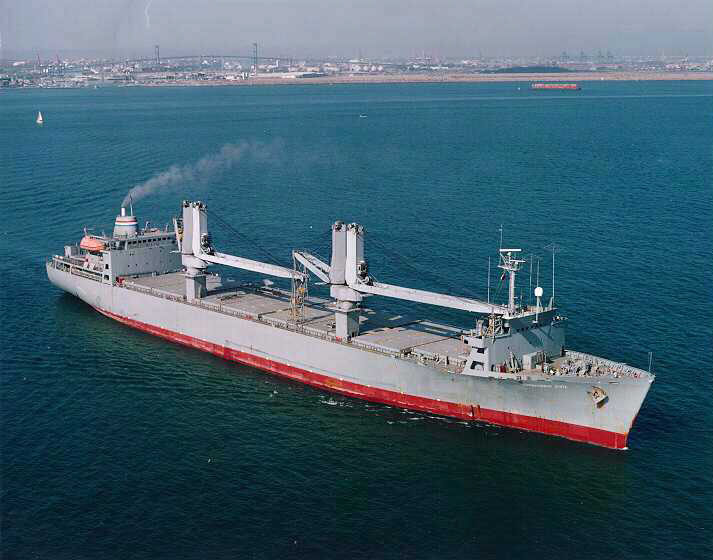
SS Cornhusker State (T-ACS-6)

unknown class: MA type C6-S-MA1qd

- SS Keystone State (T-ACS-1) [R]
- SS Gem State (T-ACS-2) [R]
- SS Grand Canyon State (T-ACS-3) [I]

Gopher State-class: MA type C5-S-73b

- SS Gopher State (T-ACS-4) [R]
- SS Flickertail State (T-ACS-5) [I]
- SS Cornhusker State (T-ACS-6) [R]

unknown class: MA type C6-S-1aq

- SS Diamond State (T-ACS-7) [I]
- SS Equality State (T-ACS-8)

unknown class: MA type C6-S-MA60d

- SS Green Mountain State (T-ACS-9) [I]
- SS Beaver State (T-ACS-10), later X-Band Transportable Radar Ship (XTR-1) SS Pacific Tracker

== Auxiliary aircraft carriers (ACV) ==
The Auxiliary aircraft carriers (ACV) were designated as Auxiliary aircraft escort vessels (AVG) until 20 August 1942 and then were redesignated Escort aircraft carriers (CVE) on 15 July 1943.

== Destroyer tenders (AD) ==
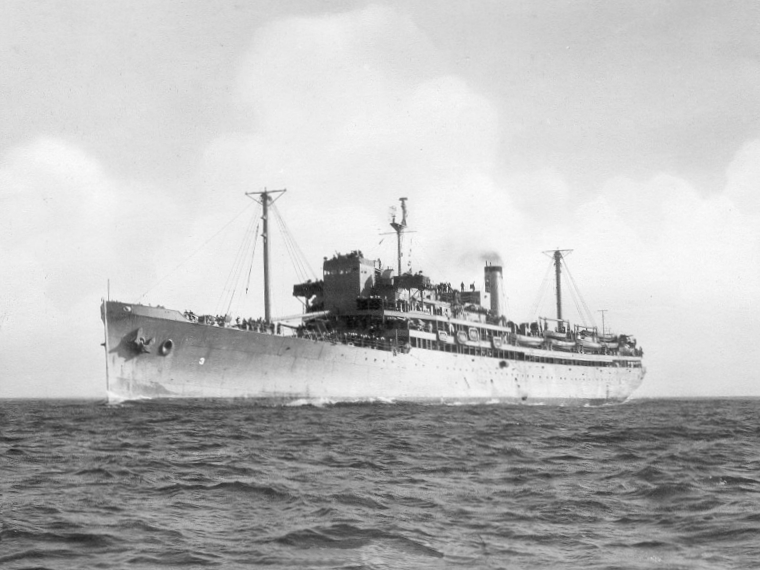
USS Dobbin (AD-3)

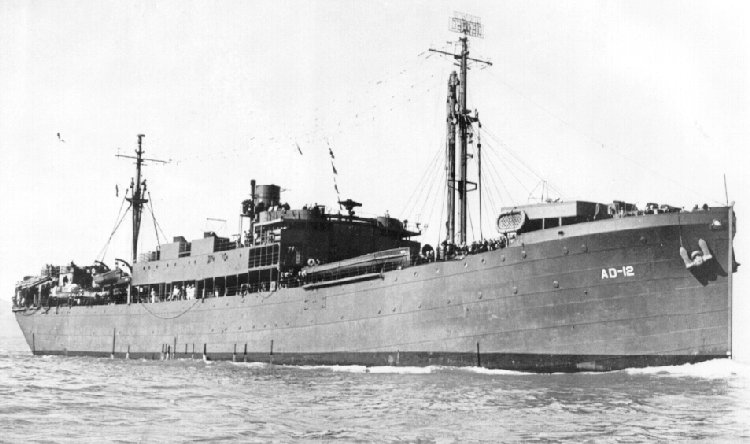
USS Denebola (AD-12)

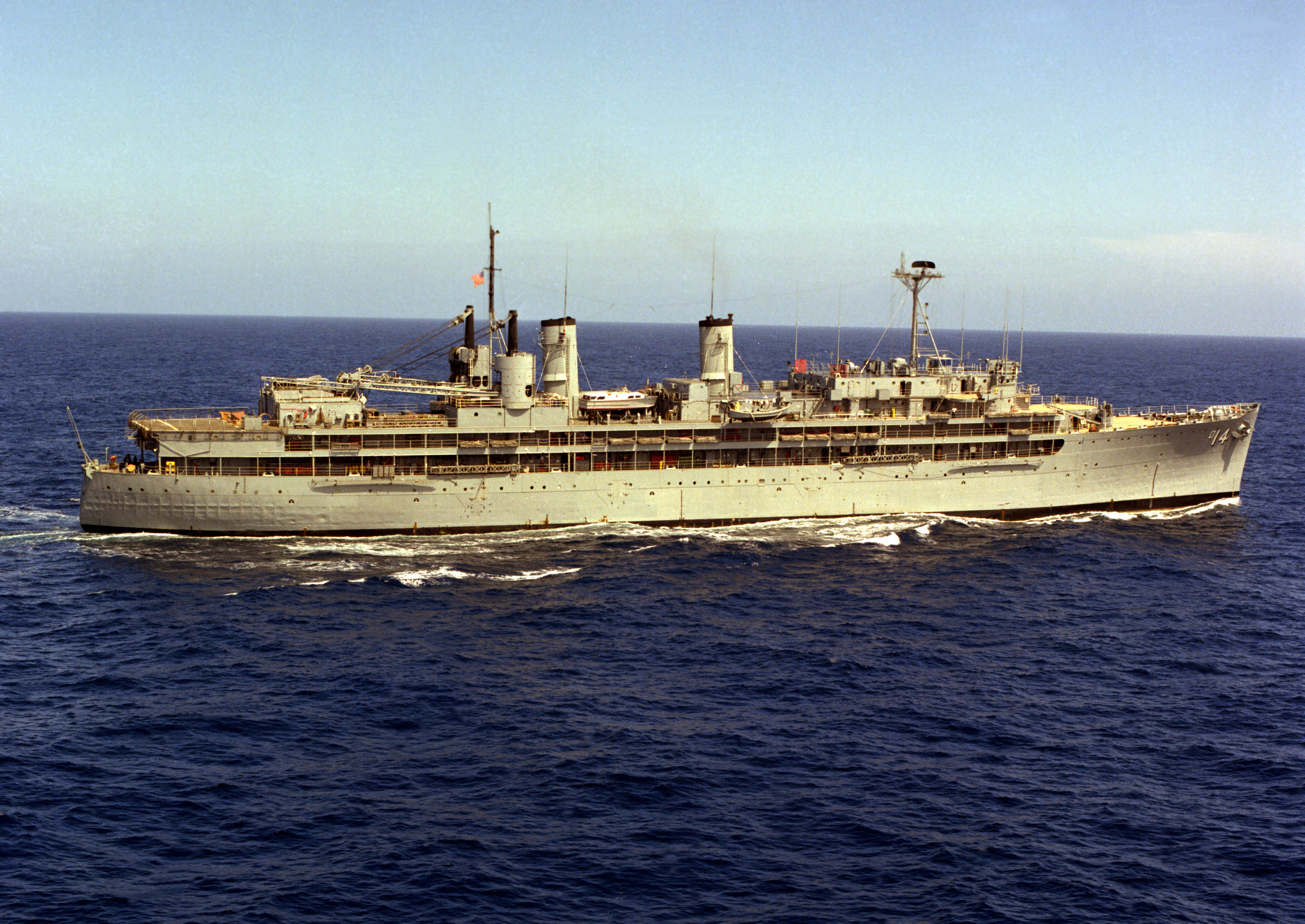
USS Dixie (AD-14)

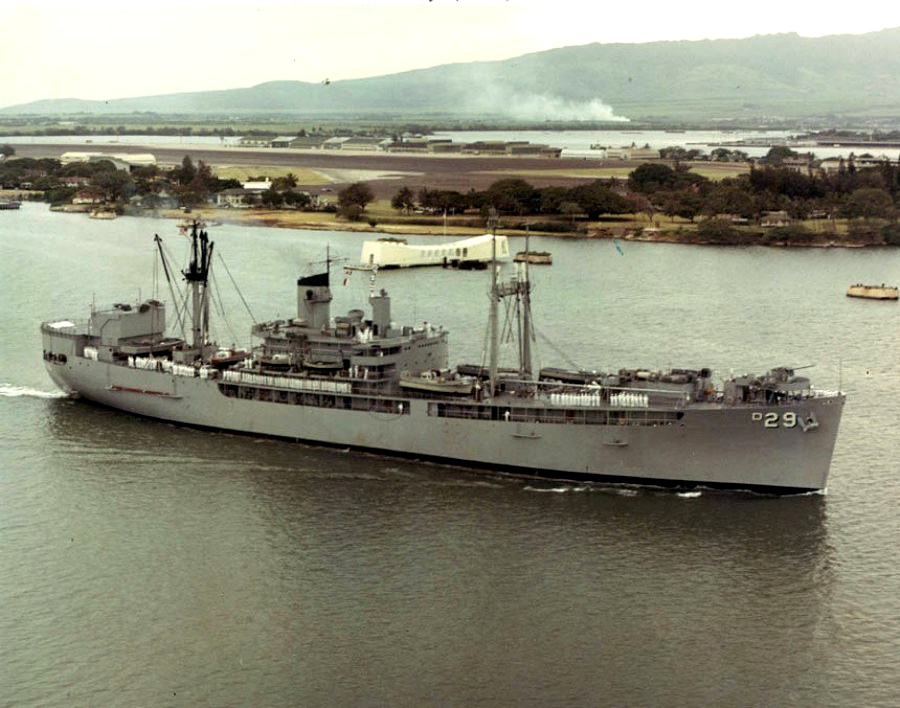
USS Isle Royale (AD-29)

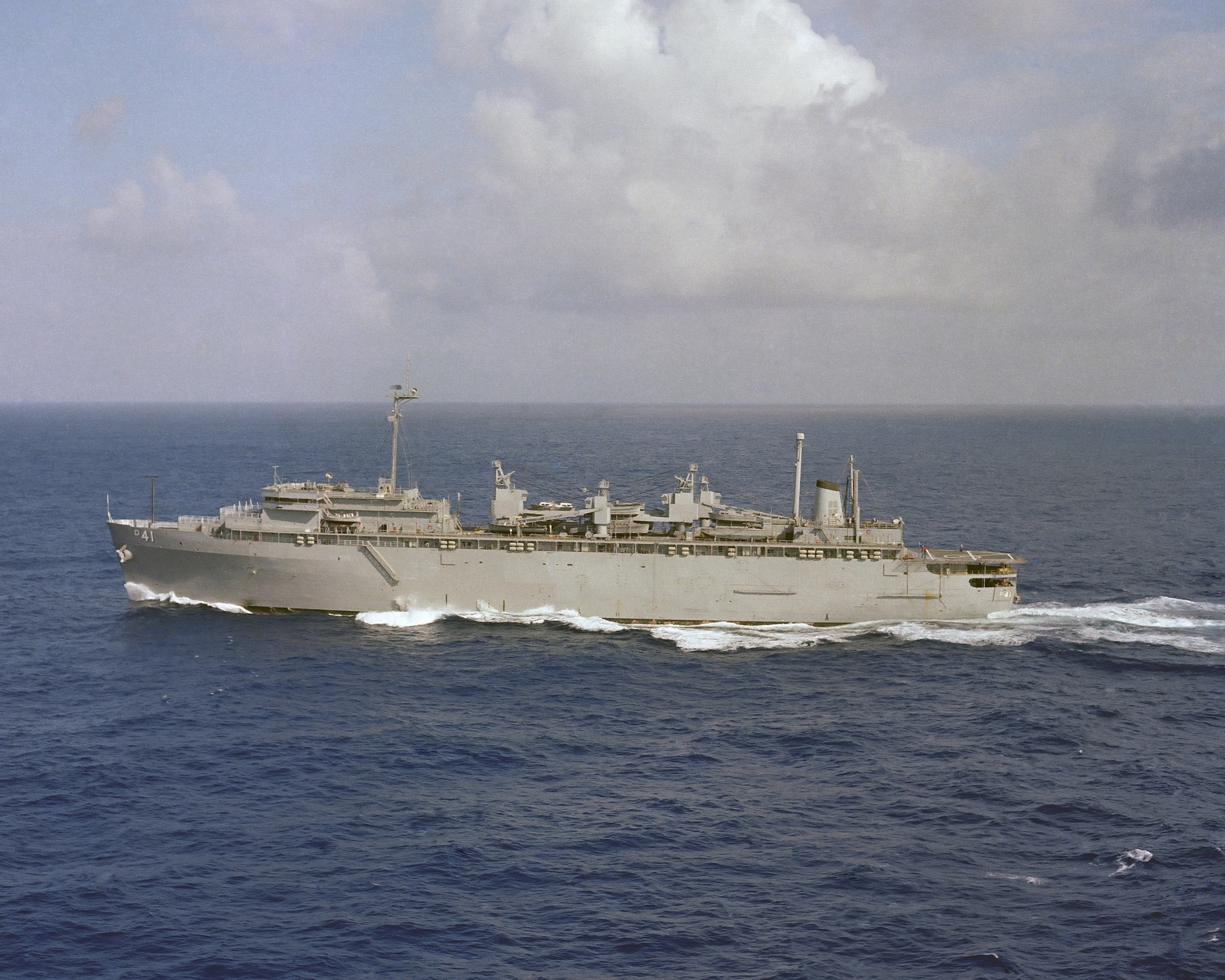
USS Yellowstone (AD-41)

- USS Dixie (AD-1)
- USS Melville (AD-2)

Dobbin-class

- USS Dobbin (AD-3)
- USS Whitney (AD-4)

Unknown classes

- USS Prairie (AD-5)
- USS Panther (AD-6)
- USS Leonidas (AD-7)
- USS Buffalo (AD-8)
- USS Black Hawk (AD-9)
- USS Bridgeport (AD-10), ex-ID-3009, ex-AR-2

Altair-class

- USS Altair (AD-11)
- USS Denebola (AD-12)
- USS Rigel (AD-13), later ARb-1, AR-11

Dixie-class

- USS Dixie (AD-14)
- USS Prairie (AD-15)
- USS Piedmont (AD-17)
- USS Sierra (AD-18)
- USS Yosemite (AD-19)

Cascade-class

- USS Cascade (AD-16)

Hamul-class: MC type C3

- USS Hamul (AD-20), ex-AK-30
- USS Markab (AD-21), ex-AK-31, later AR-23

Klondike-class: MC type C3

- USS Klondike (AD-22), later AR-22
- USS Arcadia (AD-23)
- USS Everglades (AD-24)
- USS Frontier (AD-25)

Shenandoah-class: MC type C3

- USS Shenandoah (AD-26)
- USS Yellowstone (AD-27)
- USS Grand Canyon (AD-28), later AR-28
- USS Isle Royale (AD-29)
- USS Great Lakes (AD-30), canceled
- USS Tidewater (AD-31)
- USS Canopus (AD-33), canceled
- USS Arrowhead (AD-35), canceled
- USS Bryce Canyon (AD-36)

New England-class

- USS New England (AD-32), cancelled

Alcor-class

- USS Alcor (AD-34), ex-AG-34

Samuel Gompers-class

- USS Samuel Gompers (AD-37)
- USS Puget Sound (AD-38)
- (AD-39) - canceled unnamed
- (AD-40) - canceled unnamed

Yellowstone-class

- USS Yellowstone (AD-41)
- USS Acadia (AD-42)
- USS Cape Cod (AD-43)
- USS Shenandoah (AD-44)
- (AD-45) - canceled unnamed

== Ammunition ships (AE) ==
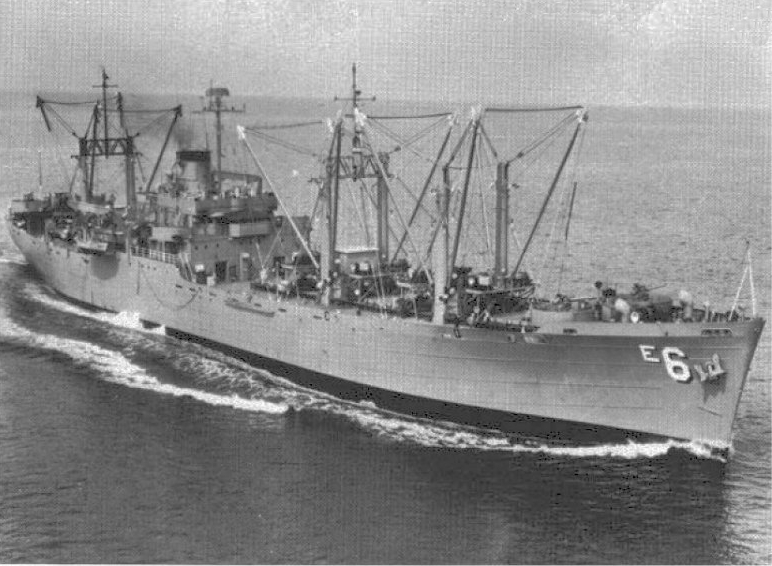
USS Shasta (AE-6)

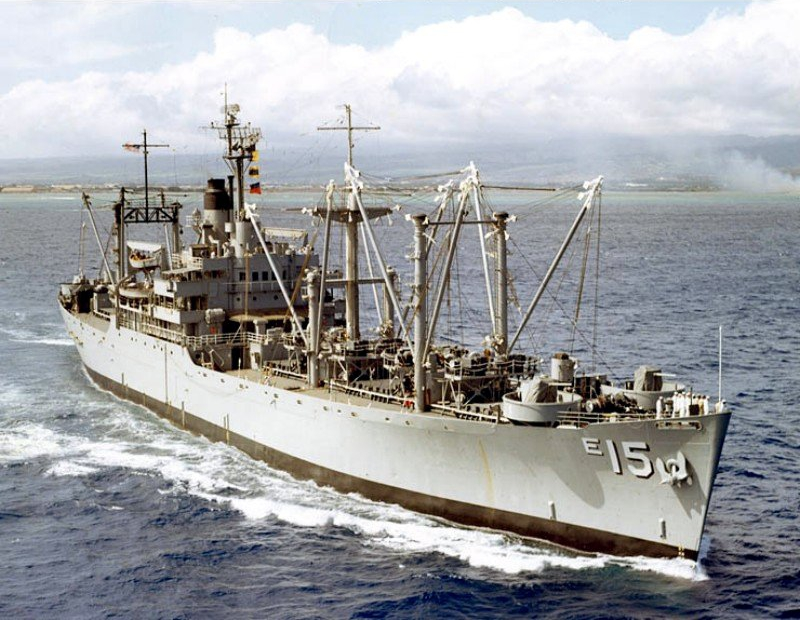
USS Vesuvius (AE-15)

USS Mauna Kea (AE-22)

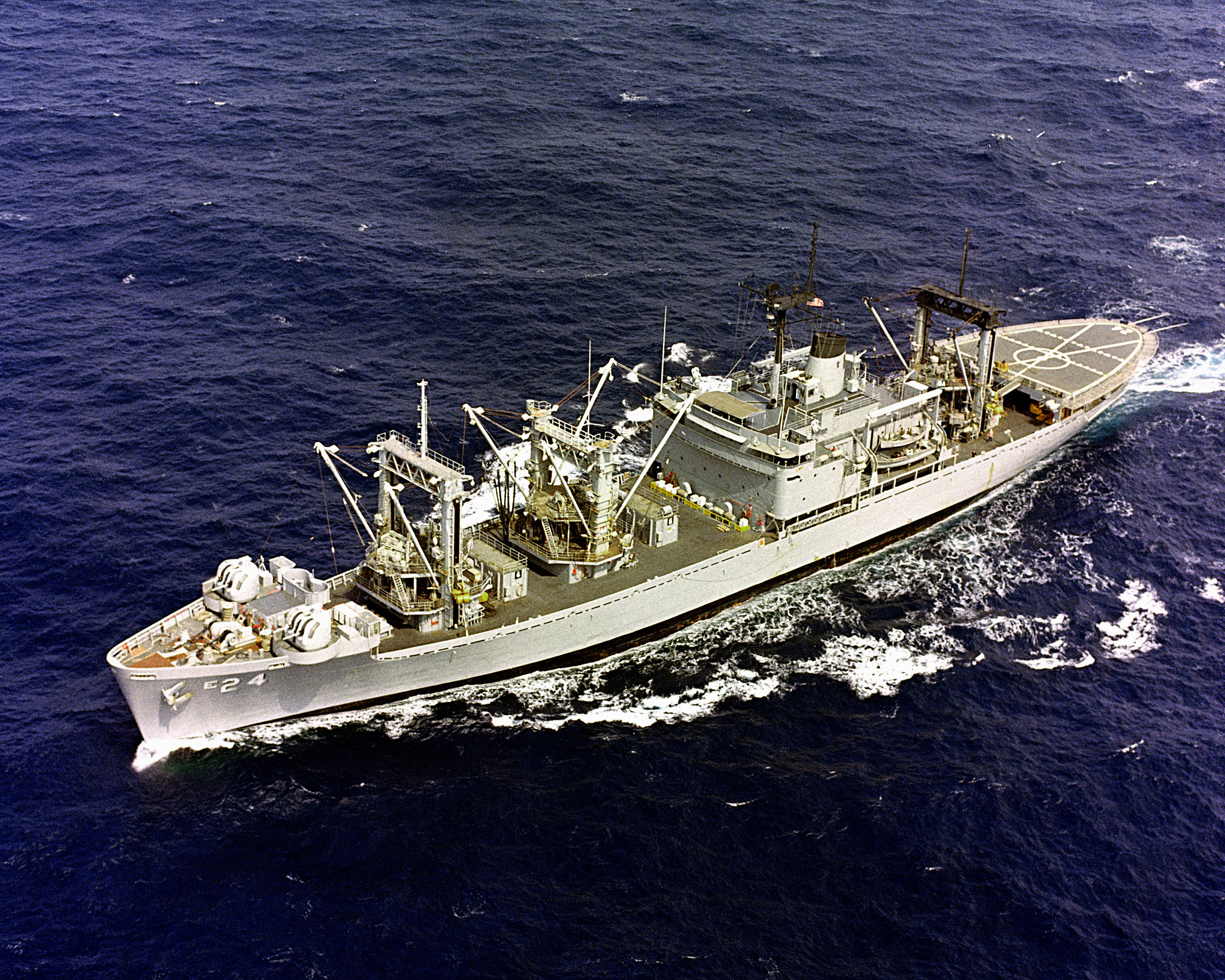
USS Pyro (AE-24)

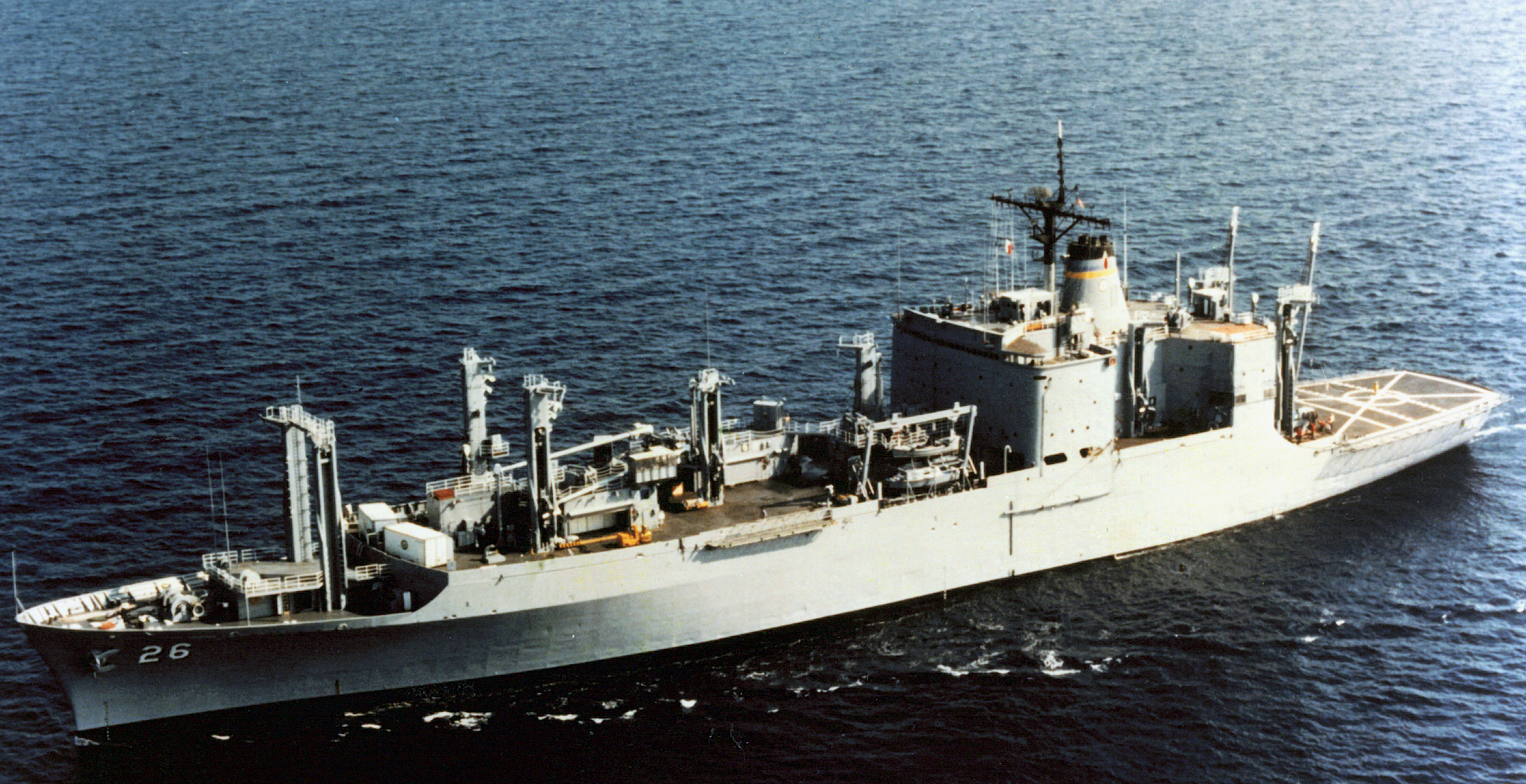
USNS Kilauea (T-AE-26)

Ammunition ships have been replaced by the more capable Advanced auxiliary dry cargo ships (T-AKE).

- USS Pyro (AE-1)
- USS Nitro (AE-2)
- Major General Henry Gibbins (AE-7), ex-ID-3661, ex-AK-33, not commissioned

Lassen-class: MC types C2, C2-T, C2-N

- USS Lassen (AE-3)
- USS Mount Baker (AE-4)
- USS Rainier (AE-5)
- USS Shasta (AE-6)
- USS Mauna Loa (AE-8)
- USS Mazama (AE-9)

Unknown class: MC type C1-A

- USS Sangay (AE-10)

Mount Hood-class: MC type C2-S-AJ1

- USS Mount Hood (AE-11), exploded on 10 November 1944, 372 killed on multiple vessels
- USS Wrangell (AE-12)
- USS Akutan (AE-13)
- USS Firedrake (AE-14)
- USS Vesuvius (AE-15)
- USS Mount Katmai (AE-16)
- USS Great Sitkin (AE-17)
- USS Paricutin (AE-18)
- USS Diamond Head (AE-19)

Fomalhaut-class: MC type C1-A

- USS Fomalhaut (AE-20), ex-AKA-5

Suribachi-class

The Suribachi class were the first ammunition ships specifically designed for underway replenishment.

- USS Suribachi (AE-21)
- USS Mauna Kea (AE-22)

Nitro-class

- USS Nitro (AE-23)
- USS Pyro (AE-24)
- USS Haleakala (AE-25)

Andromeda-class: MA type C2-S-B1

- USS Virgo (AE-30), ex-AKA-20
- USS Chara (AE-31), ex-AKA-58

Kilauea-class

- USS Kilauea (AE-26)
- USS Butte (AE-27)
- USS Santa Barbara (AE-28)
- USS Mount Hood (AE-29)
- USS Flint (AE-32)
- USS Shasta (AE-33)
- USS Mount Baker (AE-34)
- USS Kiska (AE-35)

== Auxiliary floating drydock ==
=== Large auxiliary repair docks (ABSD) ===
Reclassified as Large Auxiliary Floating Dry Docks (AFDB) in August 1946.

- USS Artisan (ABSD-1)
- USS ABSD-2
- USS ABSD-3
- USS ABSD-4
- USS ABSD-5
- USS ABSD-6
- USS ABSD-7
- USS ABSD-8
- USS ABSD-9
- USS ABSD-10

=== Large auxiliary floating dry docks (AFDB) ===
- USS Artisan (AFDB-1)
- USS AFDB-2
- USS AFDB-3
- USS AFDB-4
- USS AFDB-5
- USS AFDB-6
- Los Alamos (AFDB-7)
- USS Machinist (AFDB-8)
- USS AFDB-9

=== Small auxiliary floating dry docks (AFDL) ===
- USS Endeavor (AFDL-1)
- USS AFDL-2
- USS AFDL-3
- USS AFDL-4
- USS AFDL-5
- USS Dynamic (AFDL-6)
- USS Ability (AFDL-7)
- USS AFDL-8
- USS AFDL-9
- USS AFDL-10
- USS AFDL-11
- USS AFDL-12
- USS AFDL-13
- USS AFDL-14
- USS AFDL-15
- USS AFDL-16
- USS AFDL-17
- USS AFDL-18
- USS AFDL-19
- USS AFDL-20
- USS AFDL-21
- USS AFDL-22
- USS Adept (AFDL-23)
- USS AFDL-24
- USS Undaunted (AFDL-25)
- USS AFDL-26
- USS AFDL-27
- USS AFDL-28
- USS AFDL-29
- USS AFDL-30
- USS AFDL-31
- USS AFDL-32
- USS AFDL-33
- USS AFDL-34
- USS AFDL-35
- USS AFDL-36
- USS AFDL-37
- USS AFDL-38
- USS AFDL-39
- USS AFDL-40
- USS AFDL-41
- USS AFDL-42
- USS AFDL-43
- USS AFDL-44
- USS AFDL-45
- USS AFDL-46
- USS Reliance (AFDL-47)
- USS Diligence (AFDL-48)

=== Medium auxiliary floating dry docks (AFDM) ===
All AFDMs were classified as YFDs until 1945.

- USS AFDM-1
- USS AFDM-2
- USS AFDM-3
- USS AFDM-4
- USS Resourceful (AFDM-5)
- USS Competent (AFDM-6)
- USS Sustain (AFDM-7)
- USS Richland (AFDM-8)
- USS AFDM-9
- USS Resolute (AFDM-10) [I]
- USS AFDM-11
- USS AFDM-12
- USS AFDM-13
- USS Steadfast (AFDM-14)

=== Auxiliary repair docks (ARD) ===
- USS ARD-1
- USS ARD-2
- USS ARD-3
- USS ARD-4
- USS Waterford (ARD-5)
- USS ARD-6
- USS West Milton (ARD-7)
- USS ARD-8
- USS ARD-9
- USS ARD-10
- USS ARD-11
- USS ARD-12
- USS ARD-13
- USS ARD-14
- USS ARD-15
- USS ARD-16
- USS ARD-17
- USS ARD-18
- USS ARD-19
- USS White Sands (ARD-20), later T-AGDS-1
- USS ARD-21
- USS Windsor (ARD-22)
- USS ARD-23
- USS ARD-24
- USS ARD-25
- USS ARD-26
- USS ARD-27
- USS ARD-28
- USS Arco (ARD-29)
- USS San Onofre (ARD-30)
- USS ARD-31
- USS ARD-32
- USS ARD-33

=== Medium auxiliary repair docks (ARDM) ===
- USS Oak Ridge (ARDM-1)
- USS Alamogordo (ARDM-2)
- USS Endurance (ARDM-3)
- Shippingport (ARDM-4) [A]
- Arco (ARDM-5) [A]

=== Yard floating drydocks (YFD) ===
All YFDs were reclassified as AFDMs in 1945.

== Provisions store ships (AF, T-AF) ==
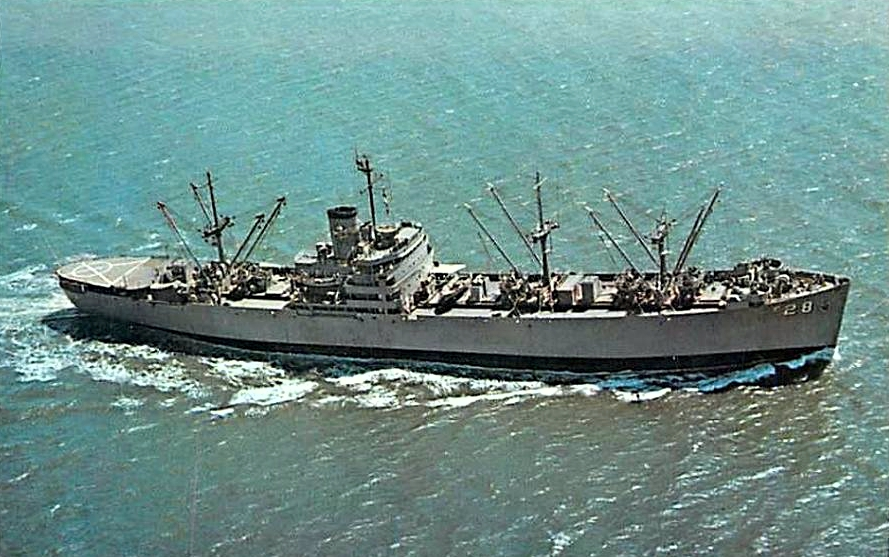
USS Hyades (AF-28)

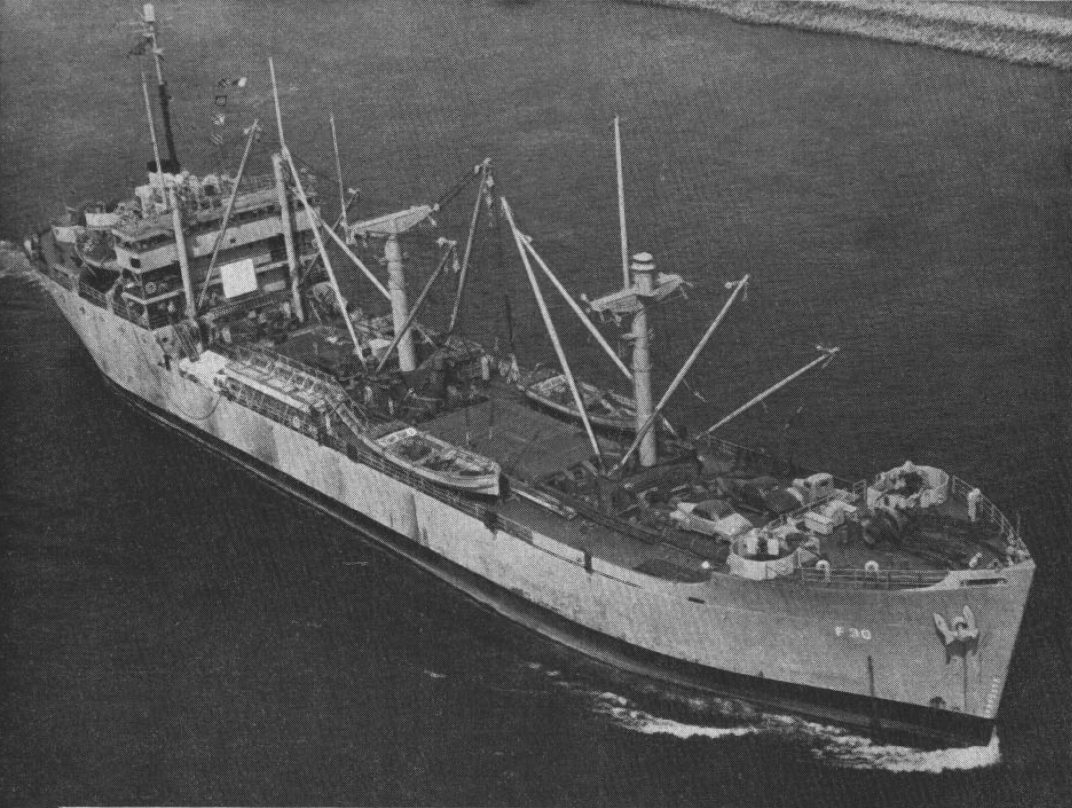
USS Adria (AF-30)

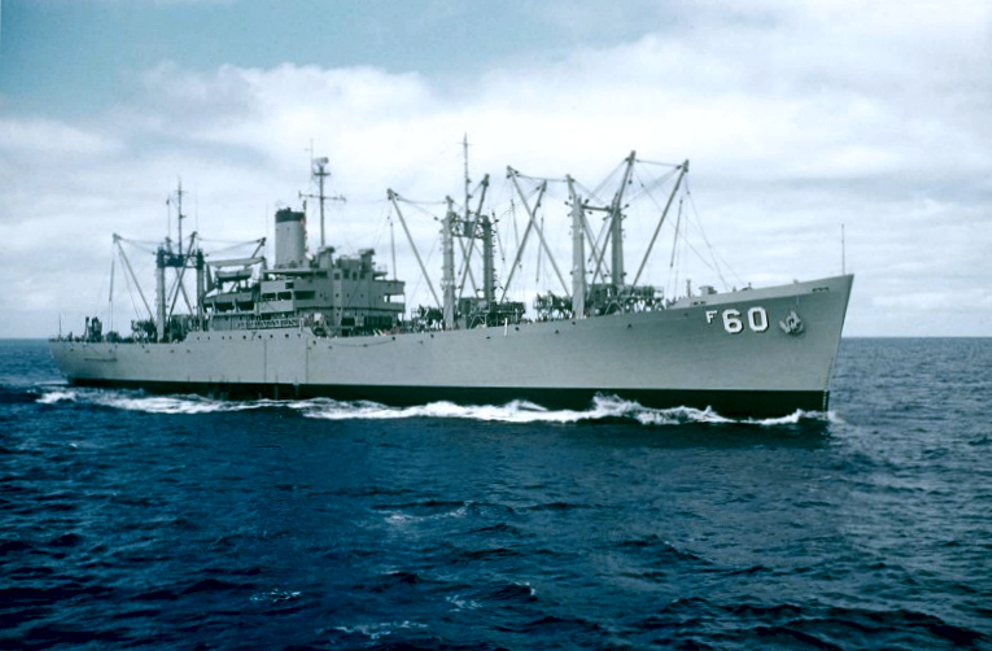
USS Sirius (AF-60)

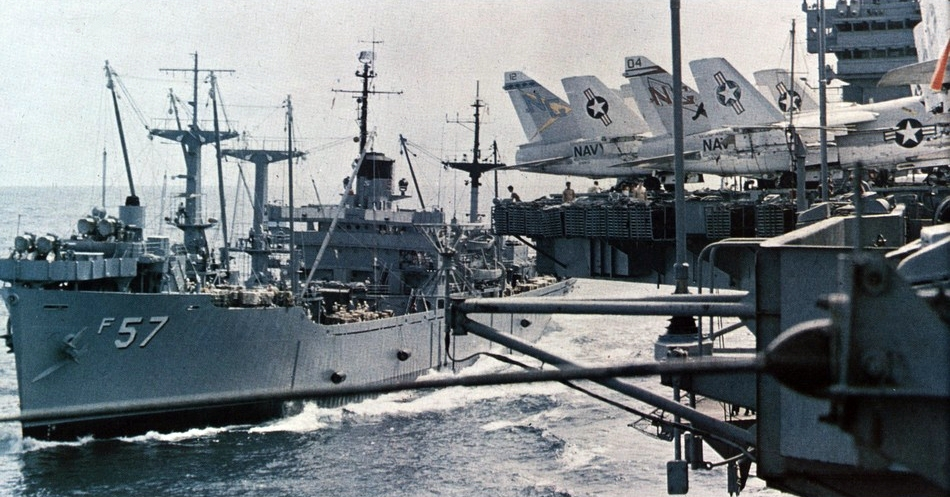
USS Regulus (AF-57)

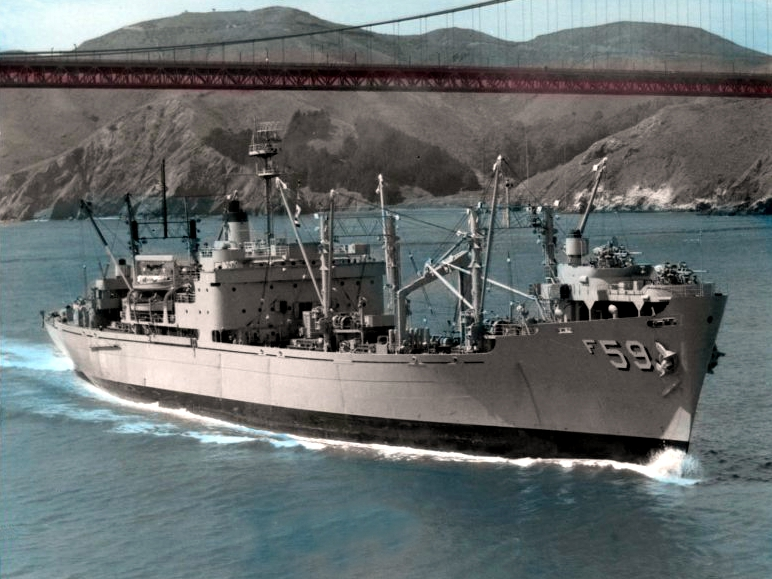
USS Vega (AF-59)

- USS Bridge (AF-1)
- USS Celtic (AF-2)
- USS Culgoa (AF-3)
- USS Glacier (AF-4)
- USS Pompey (AF-5)
- USS Rappahannock (AF-6), ex-ID-1854
- USS Arctic (AF-7), ex-ID-3806
- USS Boras (AF-8)
- USS Yukon (AF-9)
- USS Aldebaran (AF-10)
- USS Polaris (AF-11)
- USS Mizar (AF-12)
- USS Tarazed (AF-13)
- USS Uranus (AF-14)
- USS Talamanca (AF-15)
- USS Pastores (AF-16), ex-ID-4540
- USS Antigua (AF-17)
- USS Calamares (AF-18), ex-ID-3662
- USS Roamer (AF-19)
- USS Pontiac (AF-20)
- USS Merak (AF-21)
- USS Ariel (AF-22)
- USS Cygnus (AF-23)
- USS Delphinus (AF-24)
- USS Taurus (AF-25)
- USS Octans (AF-26)
- USS Pictor (AF-27)
- USS Saturn (AF-40), ex-AK-49

Hyades-class: MC type C2-S-E1

- USS Hyades (AF-28)
- USS Graffias (AF-29)

Adria-class: MC type R1-M-AV3

- USS Adria (AF-30)
- USS Arequipa (AF-31), nuclear tests participant (Note: USS Arequipa participated in Operation Sandstone and Operation Castle)
- USS Corduba (AF-32)
- USS Karin (AF-33), Operation Castle participant
- USS Kerstin (AF-34)
- USS Latona (AF-35)
- USS Lioba (AF-36)
- USS Malabar (AF-37)
- USS Merapi (AF-38)
- USS Palisana (AF-39)
- USS Athanasia (AF-41)
- USS Bondia (AF-42)
- USS Gordonia (AF-43)
- USS Laurentia (AF-44)
- USS Lucidor (AF-45)
- USS Octavia (AF-46)
- USS Valentine (AF-47)

Alstede-class: MC type R2-S-BV1 or C2-S-B1

- USS Alstede (AF-48)
- USS Zelima (AF-49)
- USNS Blue Jacket (T-AF-51)
- USNS Golden Eagle (T-AF-52) / USS Arcturus (AF-52)
- USS Pictor (AF-54)
- USS Aludra (AF-55)
- USS Sirius (AF-60)
- USS Procyon (AF-61)
- USS Bellatrix (AF-62)

Unknown class: MC type C2-S-B1

- USNS Bald Eagle (T-AF-50)

Grommet Reefer-class: MA type C1-M-AV1

- USNS Grommet Reefer (T-AF-53), wrecked off Livorno, Italy, 15 December 1952

Denebola-class: MA type VC2-S-AP2

- USS Denebola (AF-56)
- USS Regulus (AF-57)
- USNS Asterion (T-AF-63)
- USNS Perseus (T-AF-64)

Rigel-class: MA type R3-S-4A

- USS Rigel (AF-58)
- USS Vega (AF-59)

== Combat stores ships (AFS, T-AFS) ==
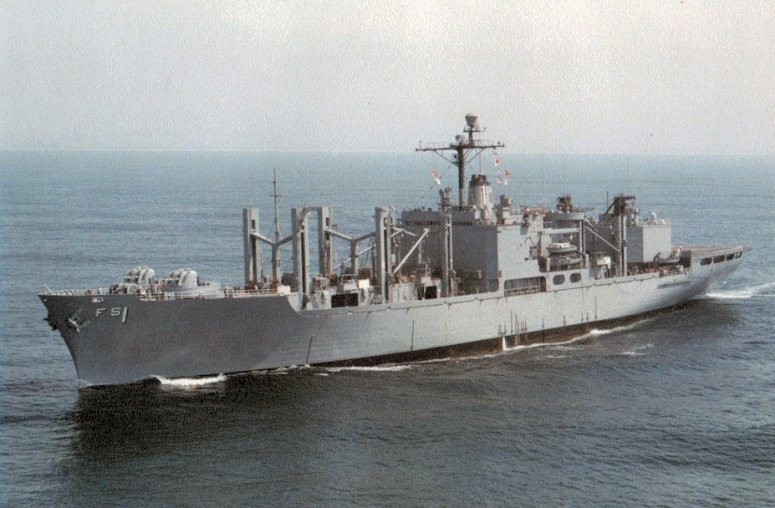
USS Mars (AFS-1)

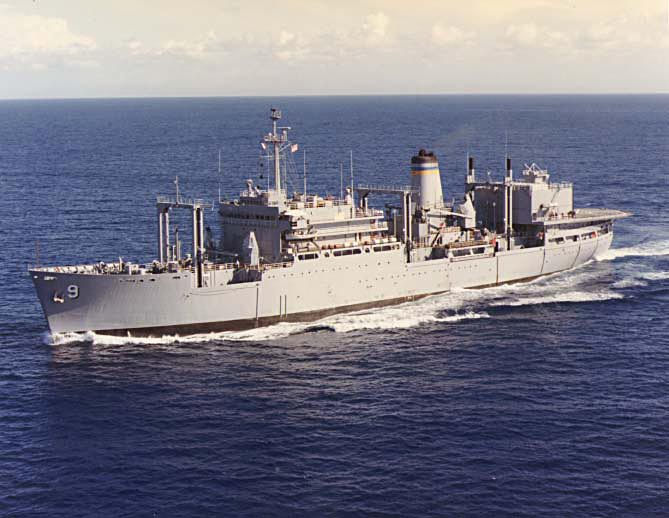
USNS Spica (T-AFS-9)

Combat stores ships have been replaced by the more capable Advanced auxiliary dry cargo ships (T-AKE).

Mars-class

- USS Mars (AFS-1)
- USS Sylvania (AFS-2)
- USS Niagara Falls (AFS-3)
- USS White Plains (AFS-4)
- USS Concord (AFS-5)
- USS San Diego (AFS-6)
- USS San Jose (AFS-7)

Sirius-class

- USNS Sirius (T-AFS-8)
- USNS Spica (T-AFS-9)
- USNS Saturn (T-AFS-10)

== Miscellaneous ships (AG, T-AG) ==
For similar lists of 'miscellaneous' ships see:

List of unclassified miscellaneous vessels of the United States Navy (IX)

and

List of yard and district craft of the United States Navy § District auxiliary, miscellaneous (YAG)

- USS Hannibal (AG-1), survey ship
- USS Lebanon (AG-2), collier, supply ship, target tug
- USS Nanshan (AG-3), collier
- USS Saturn (AG-4), collier
- USS General Alava (AG-5), war prize, cargo ship
- USS Dubuque (AG-6), later IX-9, PG-17
- USS Paducah (AG-7), later IX-23, PG-18
- USS Mahanna (AG-8), cargo ship
- USS Great Northern (AG-9), transport
- USS Antares (AG-10), later AKS-3
- USS Procyon (AG-11), later IX-38
- USS Gold Star (AG-12), ex-AK-12
- USS Pensacola (AG-13), ex-AK-7
- USS Abarenda (AG-14), ex-AC-13
- USS Ajax (AG-15), seaplane tender, ex-AC-14
- USS Utah (AG-16), target ship, ex-BB-31, sunk Pearl Harbor 7 December 1941, 58 killed

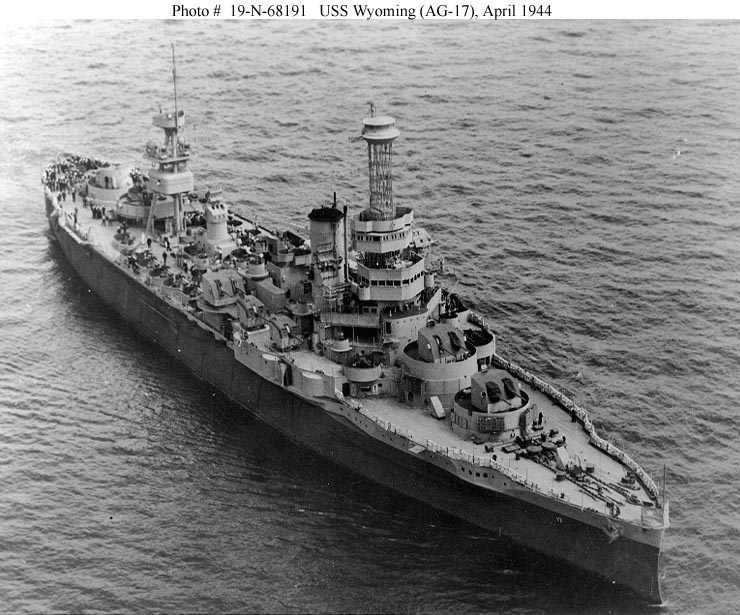
USS Wyoming (AG-17)

- USS Wyoming (AG-17), training ship, ex-BB-32
- USS Stoddert (AG-18), target ship, ex- and later DD-302
- USS Boggs (AG-19), ex-DD-136, later and ex-DMS-3
- USS Kilty (AG-20), ex- and later DD-137, later APD-15
- USS Lamberton (AG-21), ex-DD-119, later and ex-DMS-2
- USS Radford (AG-22), target ship, ex- and later DD-120

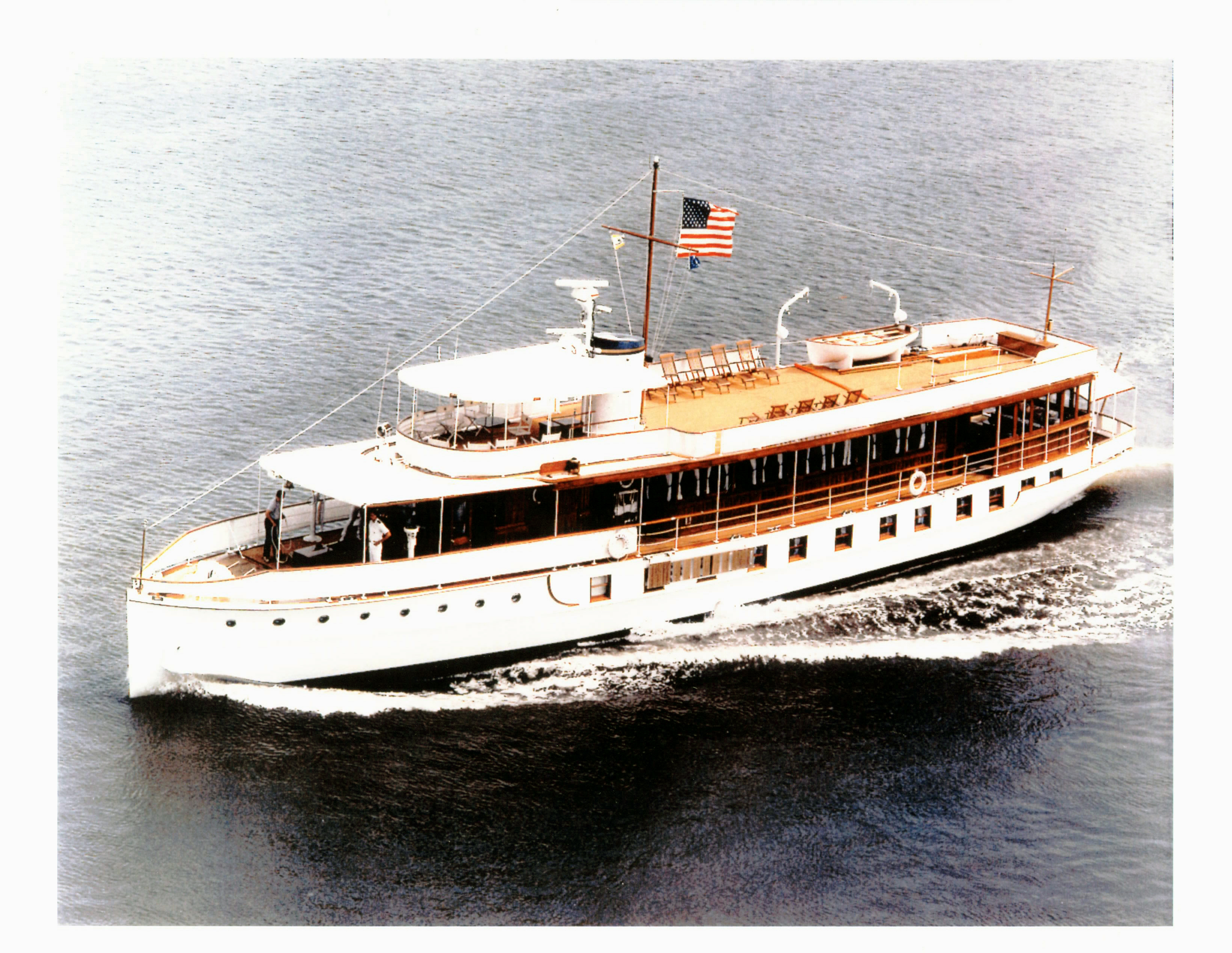
USS Sequoia (AG-23)

- USS Sequoia (AG-23), presidential yacht
- USS Semmes (AG-24), electronics test ship, ex-DD-189

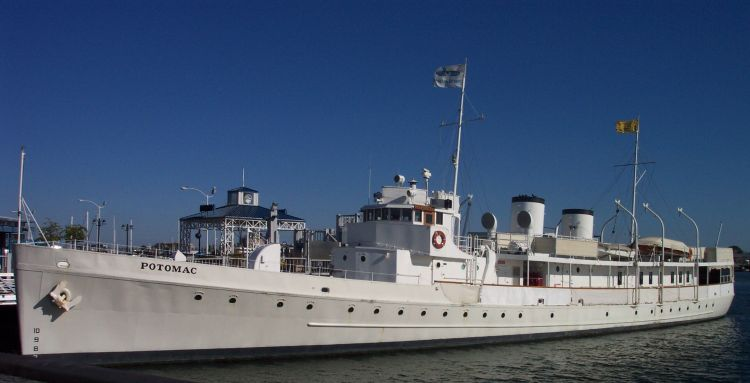
USS Potomac (AG-25)

- USS Potomac (AG-25), presidential yacht
- USS Cuyahoga (AG-26), presidential yacht tender, ex-WSC-157, later WIX-157
- USS Robert L. Barnes (AG-27), ex-AO-14, captured Guam December 1941
- USS Manley (AG-28), ex-DD-74, later APD-1, DD-74
- USS Bear (AG-29), ex-polar research ship
- USS Bowditch (AG-30), survey ship, later AGS-4

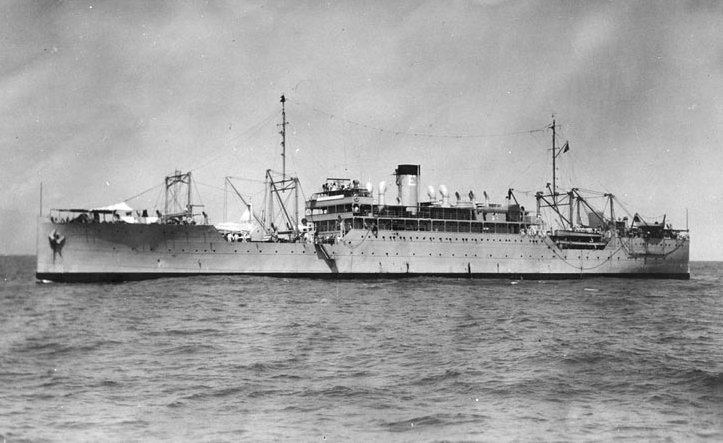
USS Argonne (AG-31) as (AS-10)

- USS Argonne (AG-31), flagship, ex-AP-4, AS-10
- USS Sumner (AG-32), survey ship, ex-AS-2, later AGS-5
- USS Kaula (AG-33), SeaBee cargo ship
- USS Alcor (AG-34), later AR-10, AD-34
- USS Calypso (AG-35), presidential yacht tender, ex-WPC-104
- USS Manasquan (AG-36), weather ship, ex-ID-3568
- USS Manomet (AG-37), ex-ID-4215B, later AK-51
- USS Mantinicus (AG-38), later AK-52, AP-75
- USS Menemsha (AG-39), weather ship, later WAG-274
- USS Monomoy (AG-40), weather ship, later WAG-275
- USS Midway (AG-41), cargo ship
- USS Camanga (AG-42), cargo ship, ex-ID-3496
- USS Majaba (AG-43), cargo ship, later IX-102
- USS Malanao (AG-44), cargo ship
- USS Taganak (AG-45), cargo ship, ex-ID-1792
- USS Tuluran (AG-46), cargo ship, ex-ID-2995
- USS Manhasset (AG-47), weather ship, ex-YAG-8, later WIX-276
- USS Muskeget (AG-48), weather ship, ex-YAG-9, later WAG-48, sunk 9 September 1942 by U-755, entire crew killed

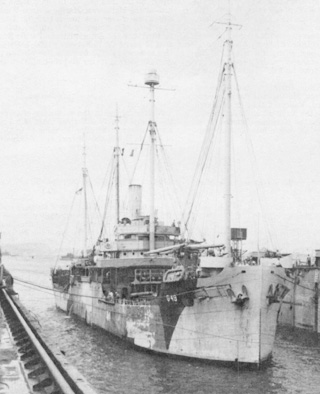
USS Anacapa (AG-49)

- USS Anacapa (AG-49), Q-ship (armed decoy)
- USS Kopara (AG-50), ex-AK-62
- USS Besboro (AG-66), cargo ship
- USS Antaeus (AG-67), ex-AS-21, later AH-18
- USS Basilan (AG-68), later ARG-12
- USS Burias (AG-69), later ARG-13
- USS Zaniah (AG-70), stores-barracks-distilling-repair ship, ex-AK-120
- USS Baham (AG-71), stores-barracks-distilling-repair ship, ex-AK-122
- USS Parris Island (AG-72), ex-PCE–901
- USS Belle Isle (AG-73), electronics repair ship, later AKS-21
- USS Coasters Harbor (AG-74), electronics repair ship, Operation Crossroads nuclear test participant, later AKS-22
- USS Cuttyhunk Island (AG-75), transport, later AKS-23
- USS Avery Island (AG-76), transport, Operation Crossroads participant, later AKS-24
- USS Indian Island (AG-77), transport, later AKS-25
- USS Kent Island (AG-78), transport, later AKS-26
- USS Wright / San Clemente (AG-79), flagship, ex-AZ-1, AV-1
- USS Du Pont (AG-80), target ship, ex-DD-152
- USS J. Fred Talbott (AG-81), target ship, ex-DD-156
- USS Schenck (AG-82), target ship, ex-DD-159
- USS Kennison (AG-83), target ship, ex-DD-138
- USS Hatfield (AG-84), target tow, ex-DD-231
- USS Fox (AG-85), target ship, ex-DD-234
- USS Bulmer (AG-86), target ship, ex-DD-222
- USS MacLeish (AG-87), target ship, ex-DD-220
- USS Burton Island (AG-88), later AGB-1
- USS Edisto (AG-89), later AGB-2
- USS Atka (AG-90), later AGB-3
- USS Dahlgren (AG-91), mine warfare test ship, ex-DD-187
- USS Gwinnett (AG-92), ex-AK-185, later AVS-5
- USS Nicollet (AG-93), ex-AK-199, later AVS-6
- USS Pontotoc (AG-94), ex-AK-206, later AVS-7
- USS Litchfield (AG-95), ex-DD-336
- USS Broome (AG-96), ex-DD-210
- USS Simpson (AG-97), target tow, ex-DD-221
- USS Ramsay (AG-98), training carrier plane guard, ex-DD-124, DM-16
- USS Preble (AG-99), plane guard, ex-DD-345, DM-20
- USS Sicard (AG-100), target ship, ex-DD-346, DM-21
- USS Pruitt (AG-101), target ship, ex-DD-347, DM-22
- USS Babbitt (AG-102), experimental sonar ship, ex-DD-128
- USS Upshur (AG-103), plane guard, ex-DD-144, DM-20
- USS Elliot (AG-104), target tow, ex-DD-146, DMS-4
- USS Hogan (AG-105), target ship, ex-DD-178, DMS-6
- USS Howard (AG-106), plane guard, ex-DD-179, DMS-7
- USS Stansbury (AG-107), training ship, ex-DD-180, DMS-8
- USS Chandler (AG-108), target tow, ex-DD-206, DMS-9
- USS Zane (AG-109), target tow, ex-DD-337, DMS-14
- USS Trever (AG-110), ex-DD-339, DMS-16
- USS Hamilton (AG-111), mine warfare test ship, ex-DD-141, DMS-18
- USS Breckinridge (AG-112), plane guard, ex-DD-148
- USS Barney (AG-113), target ship, ex-DD-149
- USS Biddle (AG-114), ex-DD-151
- USS Ellis (AG-115), plane guard, ex-DD-154
- USS Cole (AG-116), plane guard, ex-DD-155
- USS Whipple (AG-117), target ship, ex-DD-217
- USS McCormick (AG-118), ex-DD-223
- USS John D. Ford (AG-119), plane guard, ex-DD-228
- USS Paul Jones (AG-120), ex-DD-230
- USS Humboldt (AG-121), press information ship, ex- and later AVP-21
- USS Matagorda (AG-122), press information ship, ex- and later AVP-22
- USS Rockaway (AG-123), press information ship, ex- and later AVP-29
- USS Maumee (AG-124), station fuel ship, ex-AO-2
- USS Patoka (AG-125), minecraft tender, ex-AO-9, ex-AV-6
- USS McDougal (AG-126), experimental radar gunnery ship, ex-DD-358
- USS Winslow (AG-127), experimental antiaircraft ordnance ship, ex-DD-359

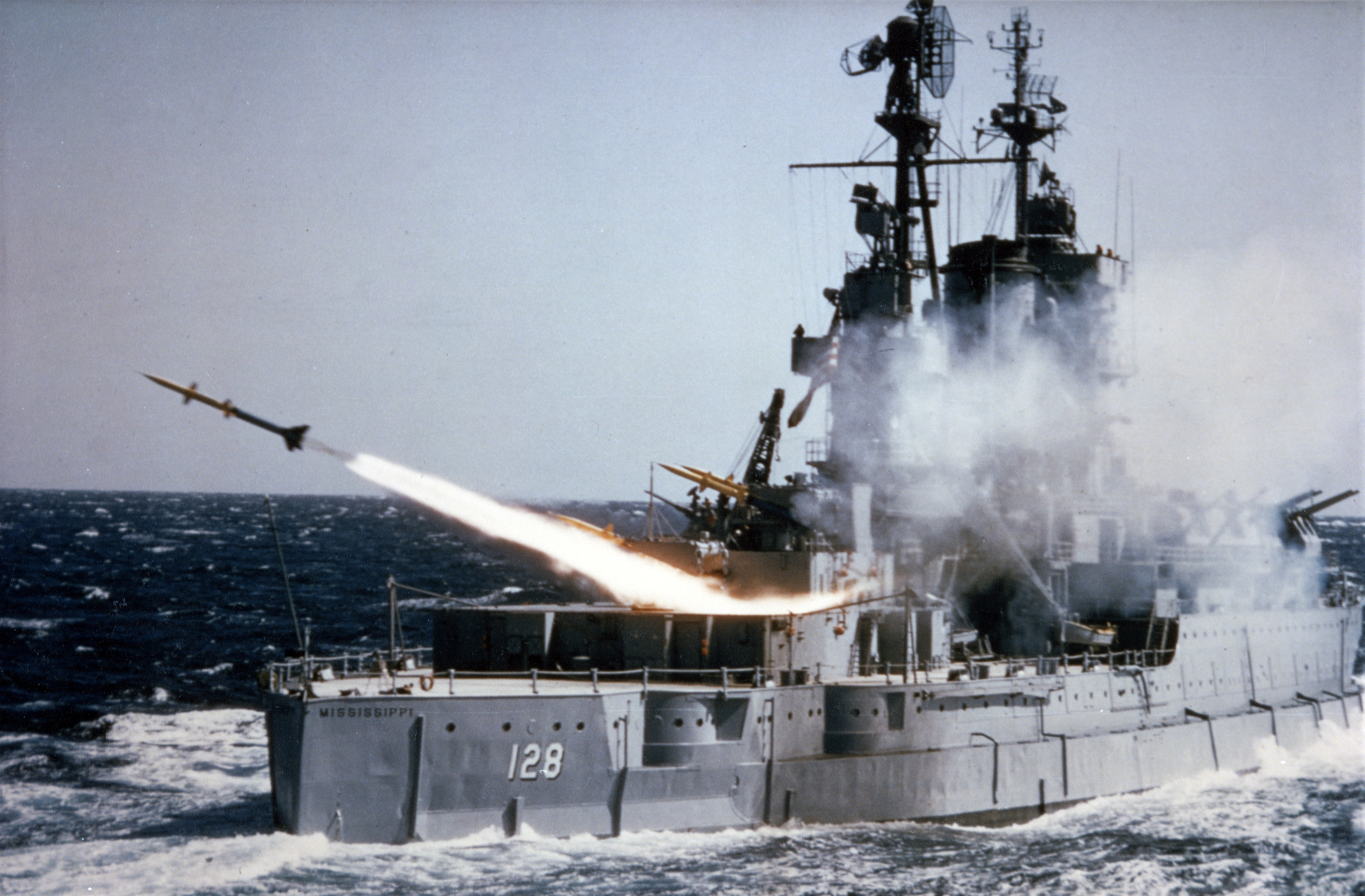
USS Mississippi (AG-128)

- USS Mississippi (AG-128), training ship, ex-BB-41
- USS Whitewood (AG-129), Arctic survey ship, ex-YN-84, AN-63
- USS Camano (AG-130), ex-US Army FS-256, later AKL-1
- USS Deal (AG-131), ex-USA FS-263, later AKL-2
- USS Elba (AG-132), ex-USA FS-267, later AKL-3
- USS Errol (AG-133), ex-USA FS-274, later AKL-4
- USS Estero (AG-134), ex-USA FS-275, later AKL-5
- USS Jekyl (AG-135), ex-USA FS-282, later AKL-6
- USS Metomkin (AG-136), ex-USA FS-316, later AKL-7
- USS Roque (AG-137), ex-USA FS-347, later AKL-8
- USS Ryer (AG-138), ex-USA FS-361, later AKL-9
- USS Sharps (AG-139), ex-USA FS-385, later AKL-10

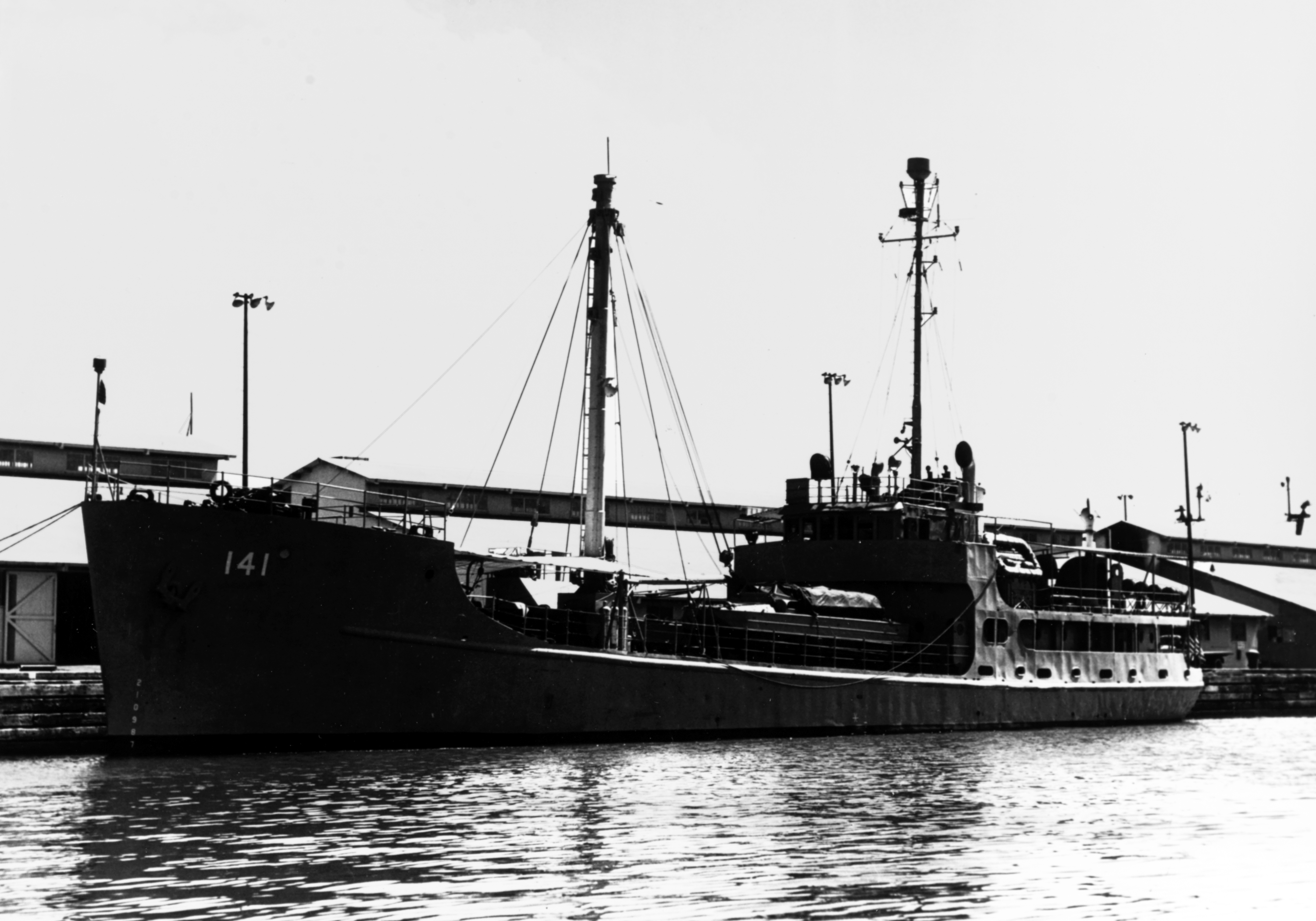
USS Whidbey (AG-141)

- USS Whidbey (AG-141), clinic, medical survey vessel, epidemiological disease control ship, ex-USA FS-395
- USS Nashawena (AG-142), cable layer, ex-USA BSP-2098 barge, later YAG-35
- USS Mark (AG-143), ex-USA FS-214, later AKL-12
- USS Hewell (AG-145), ex-USA FS-391, later AKL-14
- USS Electron (AG-146), electronics parts issue ship, ex-LST-1070, later AKS-27
- USS Proton (AG-147), electronics parts issue ship, ex-LST-1078, later AKS-28
- USS Colington (AG-148), stores issue ship, ex-LST-1085, later AKS-29
- USS League Island (AG-149), stores issue ship, ex-LST-1097, later AKS-30
- USS Chimon (AG-150), stores issue ship, ex-LST-1102, later AKS-31
- USS Richard E. Kraus (AG-151), experimental electronics ship, ex- and later DD-849

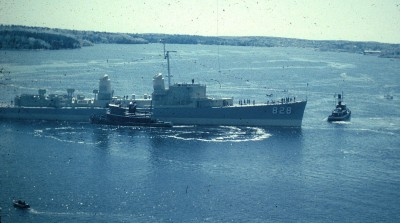
USS Timmerman (AG-152)

- USS Timmerman (AG-152), experimental ship (engines and superstructure), ex-DD-828, EDD-828

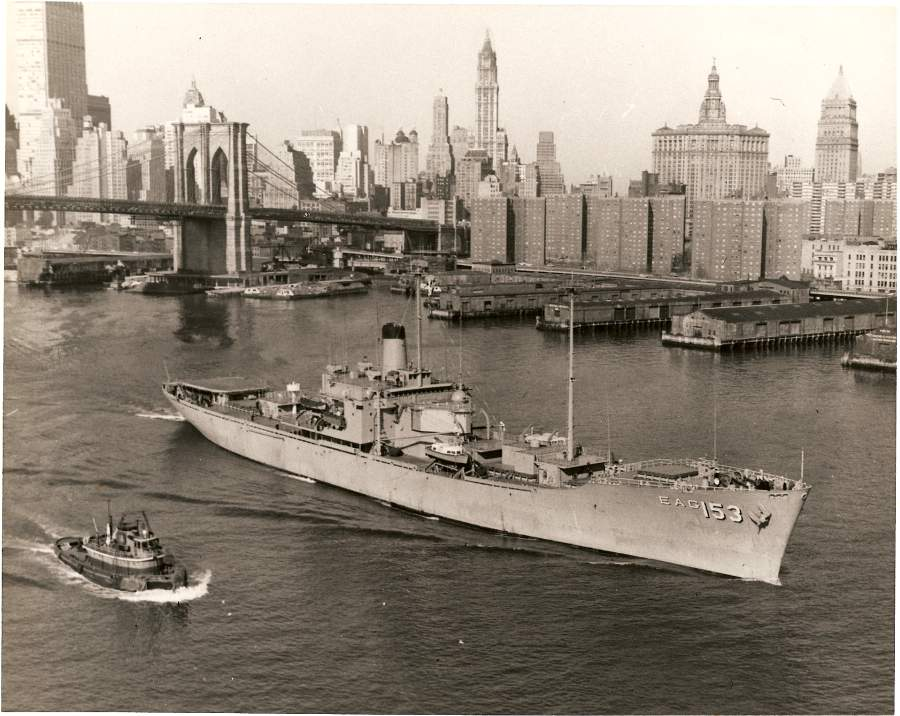
USS Compass Island (AG-153)

- USS Compass Island (E-AG-153), ex-YAG-56, inertial navigation test ship
- USS Observation Island (EAG-154), ex-YAG-57, Polaris missile test ship, later T-AGM-23
- (EAG-155), ex-SS Prairie Mariner, ex-YAG-58, conversion to Jupiter ballistic missile ship canceled
- (AG-156), intended but not used for USS Hunting ex-LSM-398, later E-AG-398

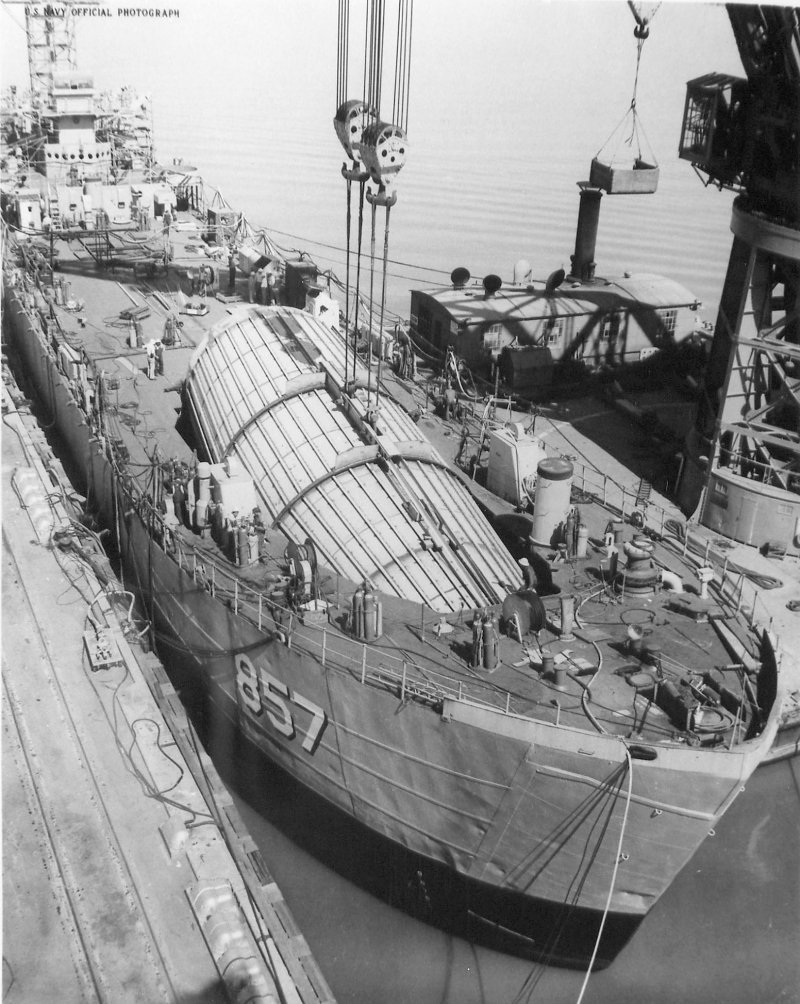
USS King County (AG-157)

- USS King County (AG-157), Regulus II missile test ship, ex-LST-857
- USS Glover (AG-158)
- USS Oxford (AG-159), SIGINT ship, later AGTR-1
- USNS Range Tracker (T-AG-160), missile range tracking ship, later T-AGM-1
- USNS Range Recoverer (T-AG-161), missile range tracking ship, ex-USA FS-278, later T-AGM-2, YFRT-524
- USNS Mission Capistrano (T-AG-162), sonar test ship, ex-T‑AO‑112
- USS Glover (AG-163)

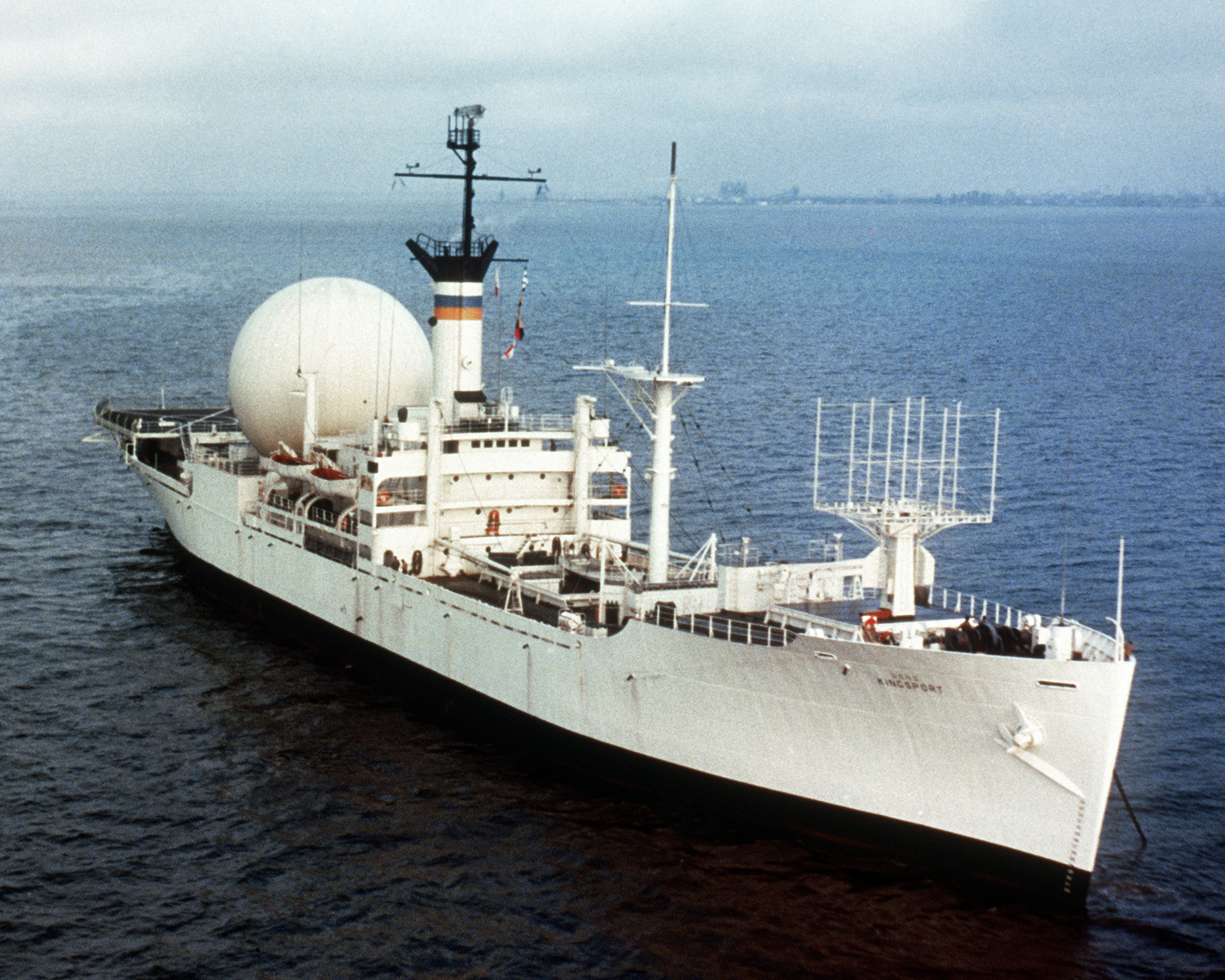
USNS Kingsport (T-AG-164)

- USNS Kingsport (T-AG-164), satellite communication ship, ex-T-AK-239
- USS Georgetown (AG-165), SIGINT ship, later AGTR-2
- USS Jamestown (AG-166), SIGINT ship, later AGTR-3
- USS Belmont (AG-167), SIGINT ship, later AGTR-4
- USS Liberty (AG-168), SIGINT ship, later AGTR-5
- USNS Pvt. Jose F. Valdez (T-AG-169) SIGINT ship, ex-APc-119
- USNS LT. James E. Robinson (T-AG-170), cable transport ship, ex-T-AKV-3, later T-AK-274
- USNS Sgt. Joseph E. Muller (T-AG-171), SIGINT ship
- USNS Phoenix (T-AG-172), depot ship
- USNS Provo (T-AG-173), depot ship
- USNS Cheyenne (T-AG-174), depot ship
- USNS Sgt. Curtis F. Shoup (T-AG-175), survey ship
- USS Peregrine (AG-176), experimental mine warfare ship, ex-AM-373, MSF-373
- USNS Shearwater (T-AG-177), survey support ship, ex-USA FS-411
- USNS Flyer (T-AG-178), SOSUS survey ship
- USNS Havenford (T-AG-179), depot ship, canceled
- USNS Antioch (T-AG-180), depot ship, canceled
- USNS Adelphi (T-AG-181), depot ship, canceled
- USNS Lynn (T-AG-182), depot ship, canceled
- USNS Clarksburg (T-AG-183), depot ship, canceled
- USNS Clemson (T-AG-184), cargo ship, canceled
- USNS Carthage (T-AG-185), cargo ship, canceled, museum ship
- USNS Bessemer (T-AG-186), depot ship, canceled
- USNS Milford (T-AG-187), depot ship, canceled
- USNS Rollins (T-AG-189), depot ship, canceled
- USS Spokane (T-AG-191), sonar test ship, ex-CL-120
- USNS S P Lee (T-AG-192), acoustics research ship, ex-T-AGS-31

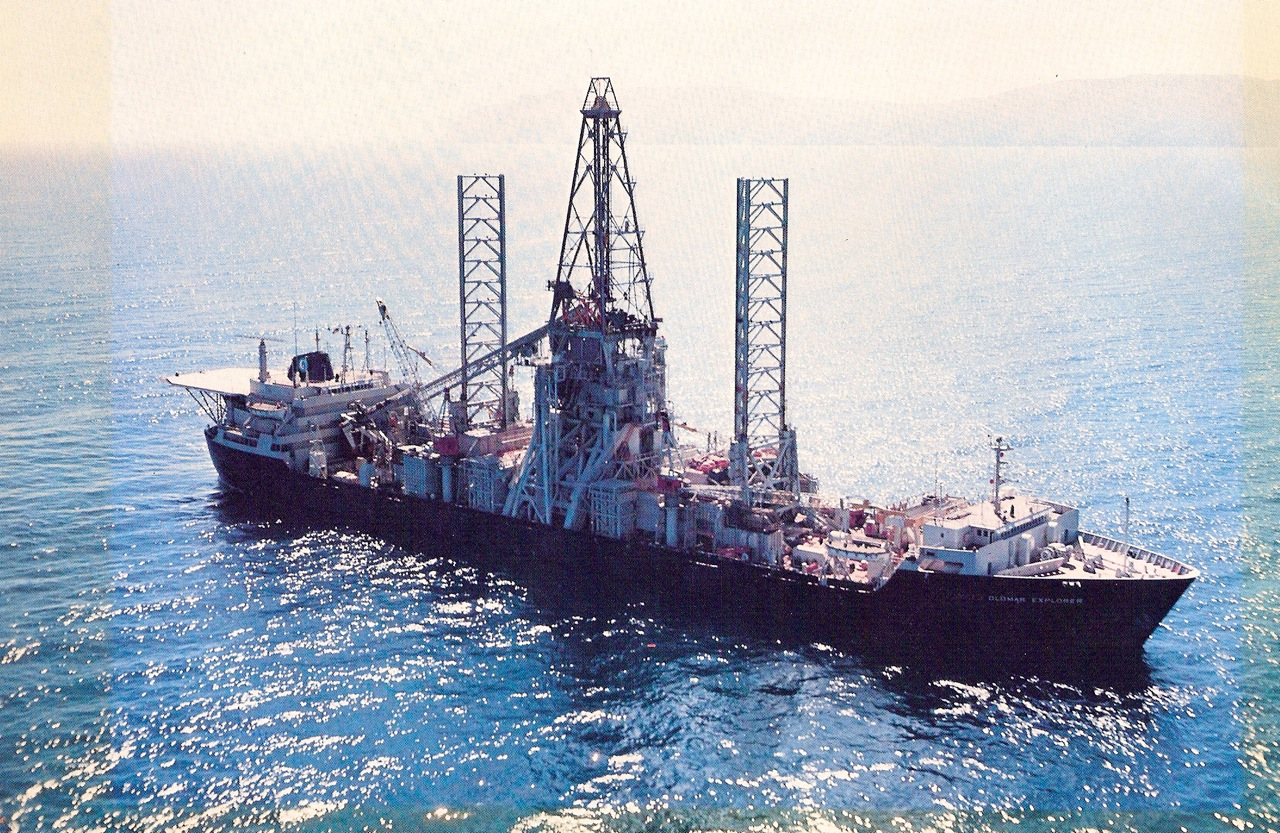
USNS Glomar Explorer (T-AG-193)

- USNS Glomar Explorer (T-AG-193), deep-sea drillship
- USNS Vanguard (T-AG-194), missile range tracking ship, ex-T-AO-122, later T-AGM-19
- USNS Hayes (T-AG-195), acoustics research ship, ex-T-AGOR-16
- USS Hunting (E-AG-398), sonar research ship, ex-LSM-398, ex-AG-156
- USS Alacrity (AG-520), ex-AM-520, MSO-520
- USS Assurance (AG-521), ex-AM-521, MSO-521
- USNS Vice Adm. K. R. Wheeler (T-AG-5001) [I], Offshore Petroleum Distribution System (OPDS) ship

== Icebreakers (AGB) ==
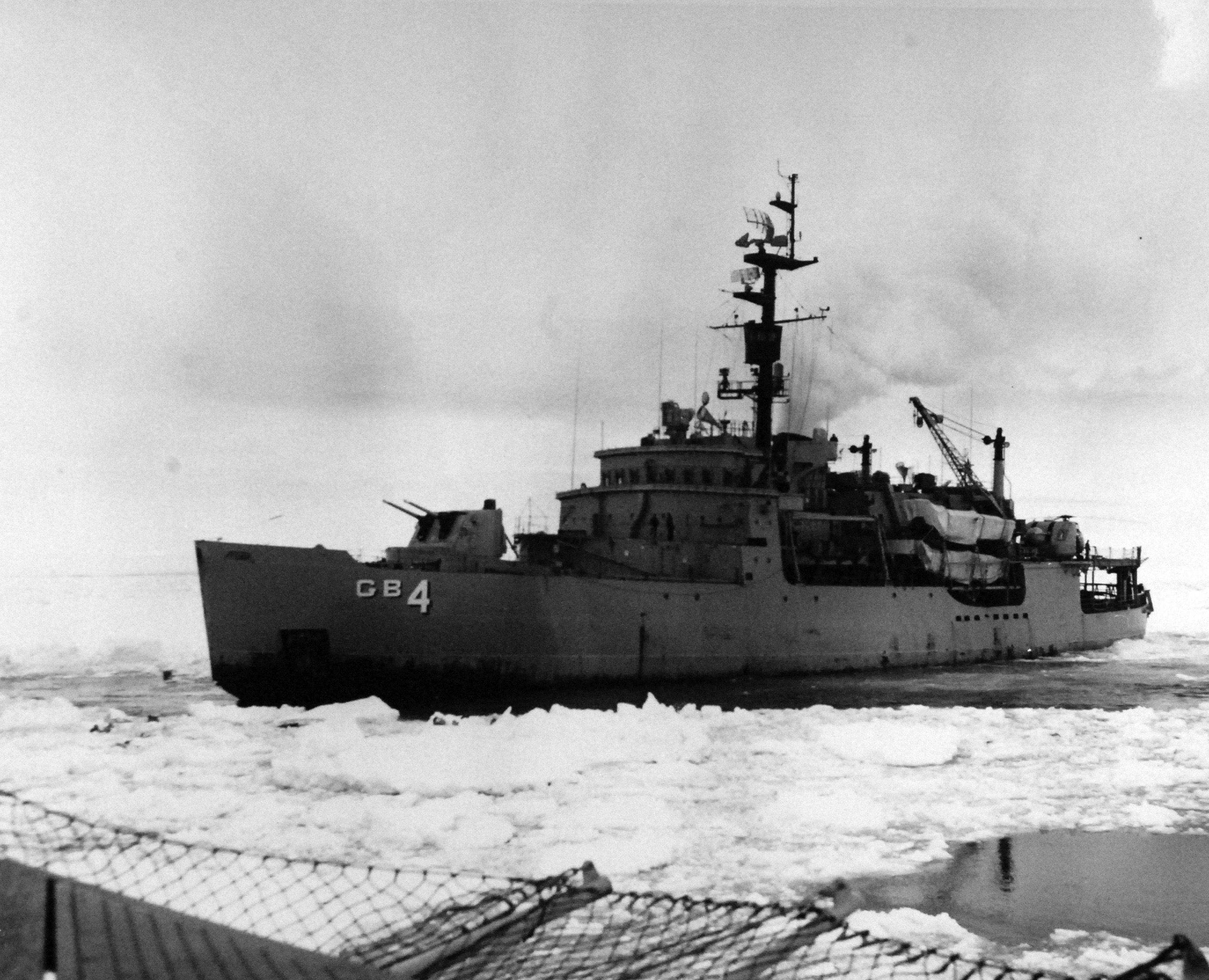
USS Glacier (AGB-4)

- USS Burton Island (AGB-1), ex-AG-88, later WAGB-283
- USS Edisto (AGB-2), ex-AG-89, later WAGB-284
- USS Atka (AGB-3), ex-AG-90, later WAGB-280
- USS Glacier (AGB-4), later WAGB-4
- USS Staten Island (AGB-5), later WAGB-278

== Deep submergence support ship (T-AGDS) ==
- USNS White Sands (T-AGDS-1), ex-ARD-20
- USNS Point Loma (T-AGDS-2), ex-AKD-1

== Hydrofoil research ship (AGEH) ==
- USS Plainview (AGEH-1)

== Environmental research ships (AGER) ==
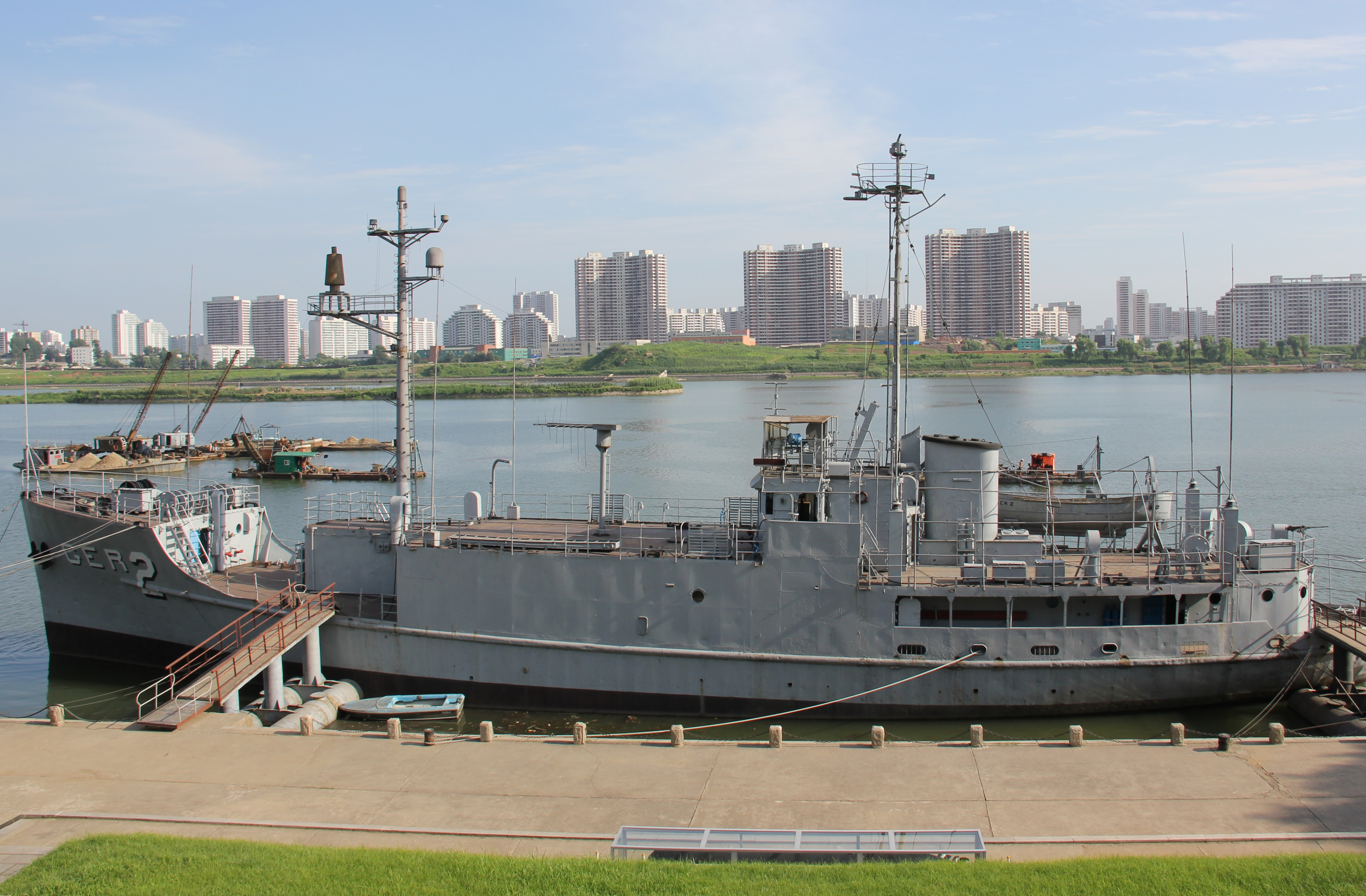
USS Pueblo (AGER-2)

Signals intelligence collection vessels.

Banner-class

- USS Banner (AGER-1), ex-AKL-25
- USS Pueblo (AGER-2) [I], ex-AKL-44, captured by North Korea 23 January 1968, 1 killed, North Korean museum ship, still in commission
- USS Palm Beach (AGER-3), ex-AKL-45

== Command ships (AGF) ==
- USS Valcour (AGF-1), ex-AVP-55
- USS La Salle (AGF-3), ex-LPD-3
- USS Coronado (AGF-11), ex-LPD-11

== Missile range instrumentation ships (T-AGM) ==
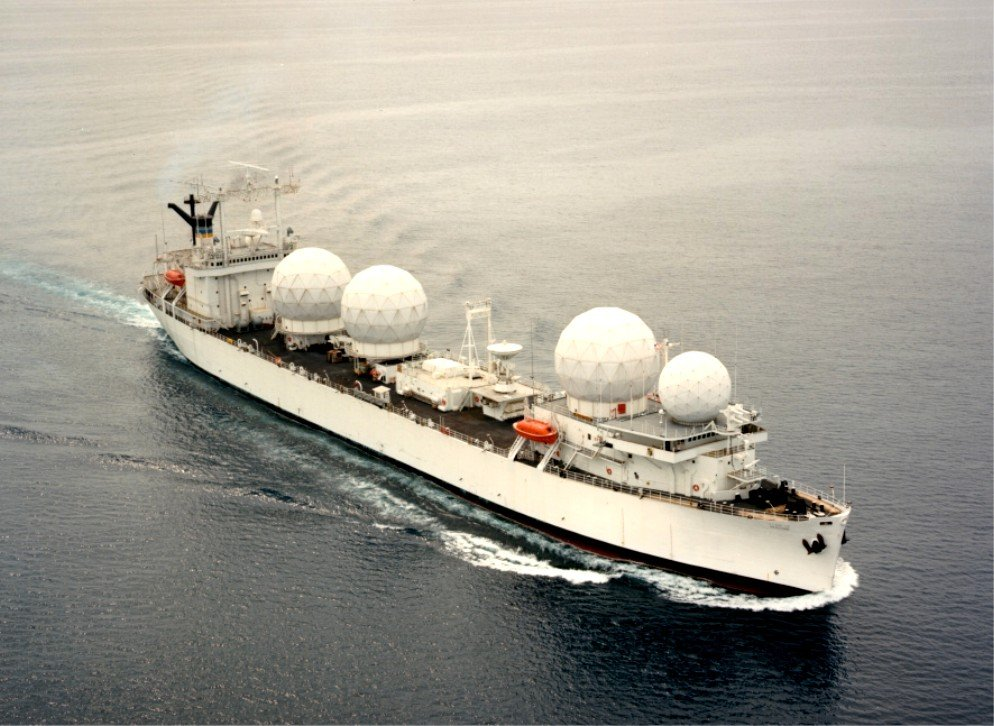
USNS Redstone (T-AGM-20)

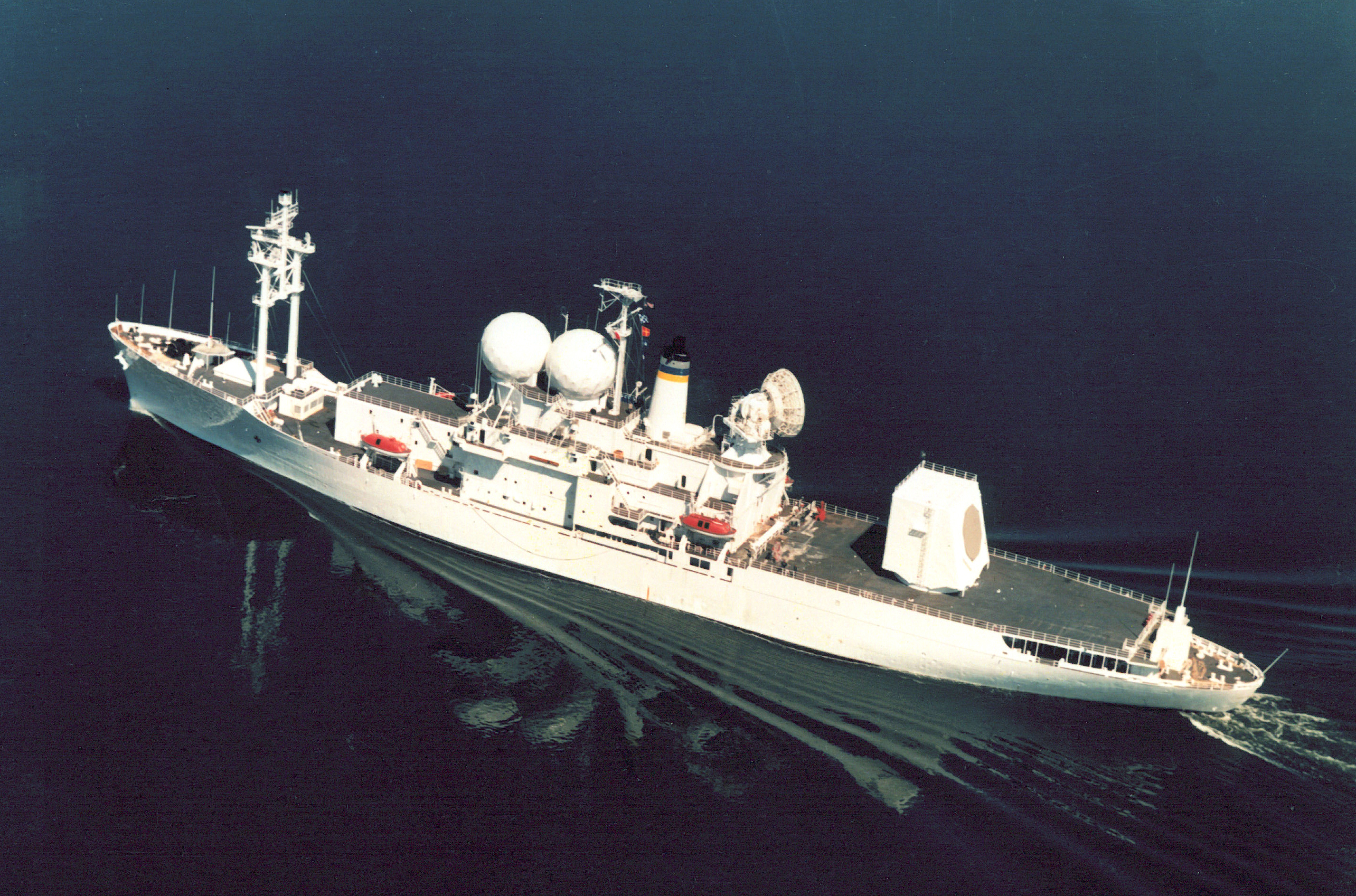
USNS Observation Island (T-AGM-23)

- USNS Range Tracker (T-AGM-1), Operation Dominic nuclear test participant
- USNS Range Recoverer (T-AGM-2), ex-T-AG-161
- USNS Longview (T-AGM-3)
- USNS Richfield (T-AGM-4)
- USNS Sunnyvale (T-AGM-5)
- USNS Watertown (T-AGM-6)
- USNS Huntsville (T-AGM-7)
- USNS Wheeling (T-AGM-8)
- USNS General H. H. Arnold (T-AGM-9), ex-AP-139
- USNS General Hoyt S. Vandenberg (T-AGM-10), ex-AP-145
- USNS Twin Falls (T-AGM-11), later T-AGS-37
- USNS American Mariner (T-AGM-12) (Note: Type EC Liberty ship, participated in the Operation Dominic nuclear tests as USAS [US Army Ship] American Mariner. She appears to have been the only ship to have served in the U.S. Coast Guard, the U.S. Army, the U.S. Air Force, and the U.S. Navy after being built for service with the United States Merchant Marine.)
- USNS Sword Knot (T-AGM-13)
- USNS Rose Knot (T-AGM-14)
- USNS Coastal Sentry (T-AGM-15)
- USNS Coastal Crusader (T-AGM-16), ex-AK-220, later AGS-36
- USNS Timber Hitch (T-AGM-17)
- USNS Sampan Hitch (T-AGM-18)
- USNS Vanguard (T-AGM-19)
- USNS Redstone (T-AGM-20)
- USNS Mercury (T-AGM-21)
- USNS Range Sentinel (T-AGM-22)
- USNS Observation Island (T-AGM-23), ex-EAG-154, ex-AG-154
- USNS Invincible (T-AGM-24), ex-T-AGOS-10 [I]
- USNS Howard O. Lorenzen (T-AGM-25) [A]

== Major communications relay ships (AGMR) ==
- USS Annapolis (AGMR-1), ex-CVE-107
- USS Arlington (AGMR-2), ex-Saipan as ex-CVL-48, ex-CC-3

== Oceanographic research ships (T-AGOR) ==
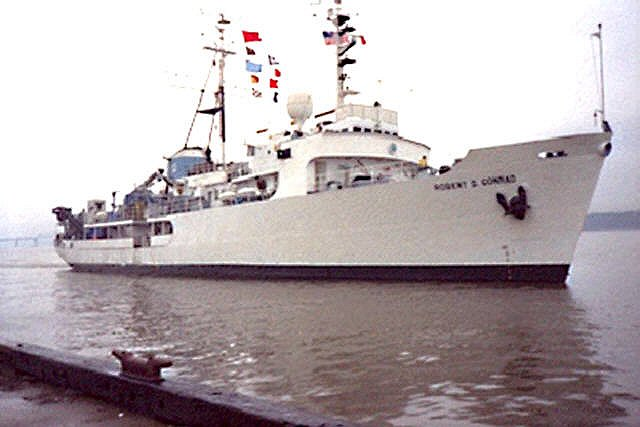
USNS Robert D. Conrad (T-AGOR-3)

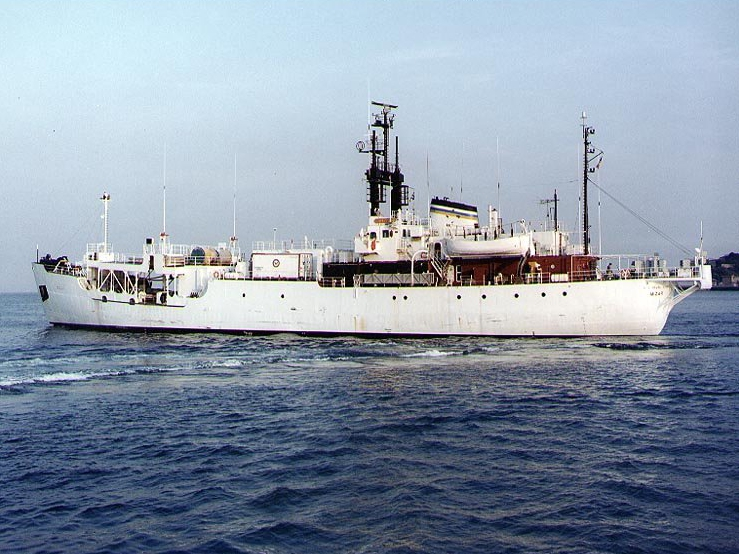
USNS Mizar (T-AGOR-11)

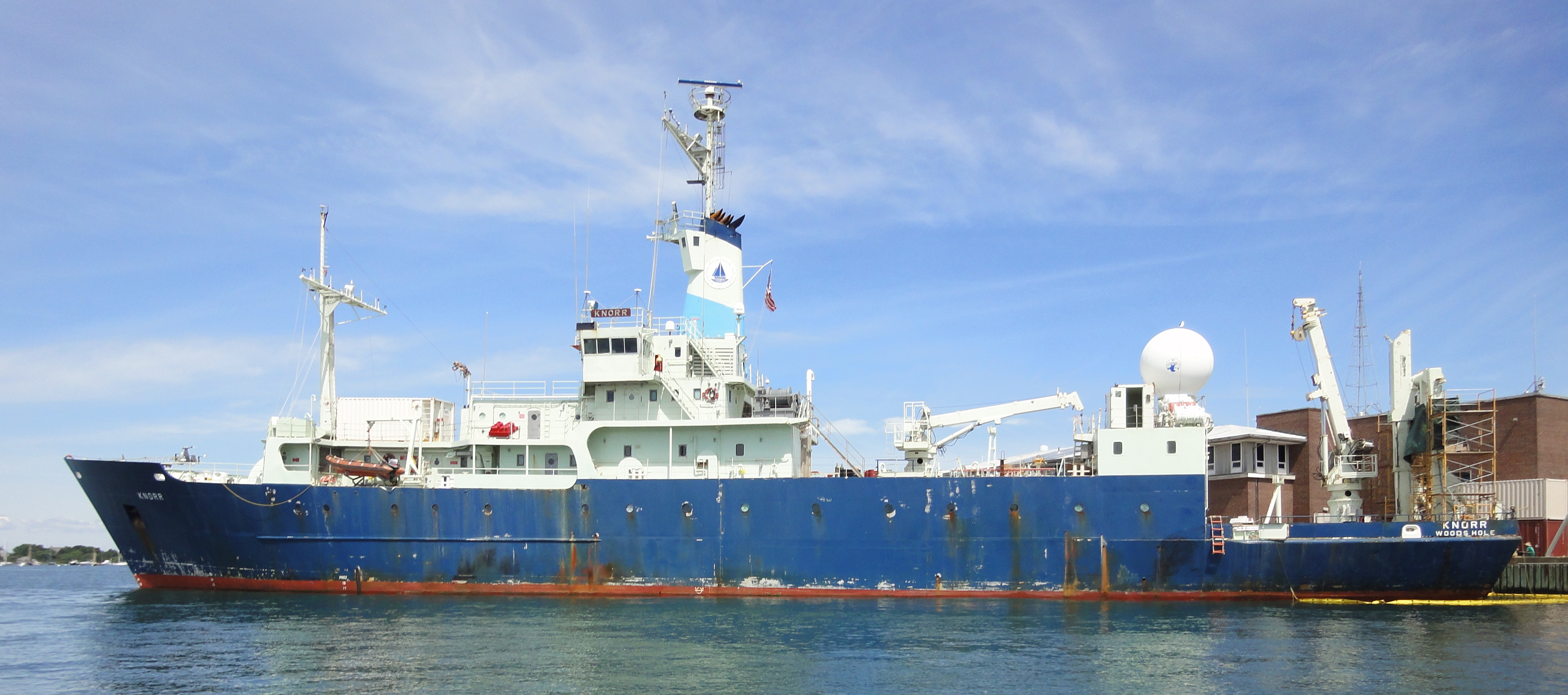
USNS Knorr (T-AGOR-15)

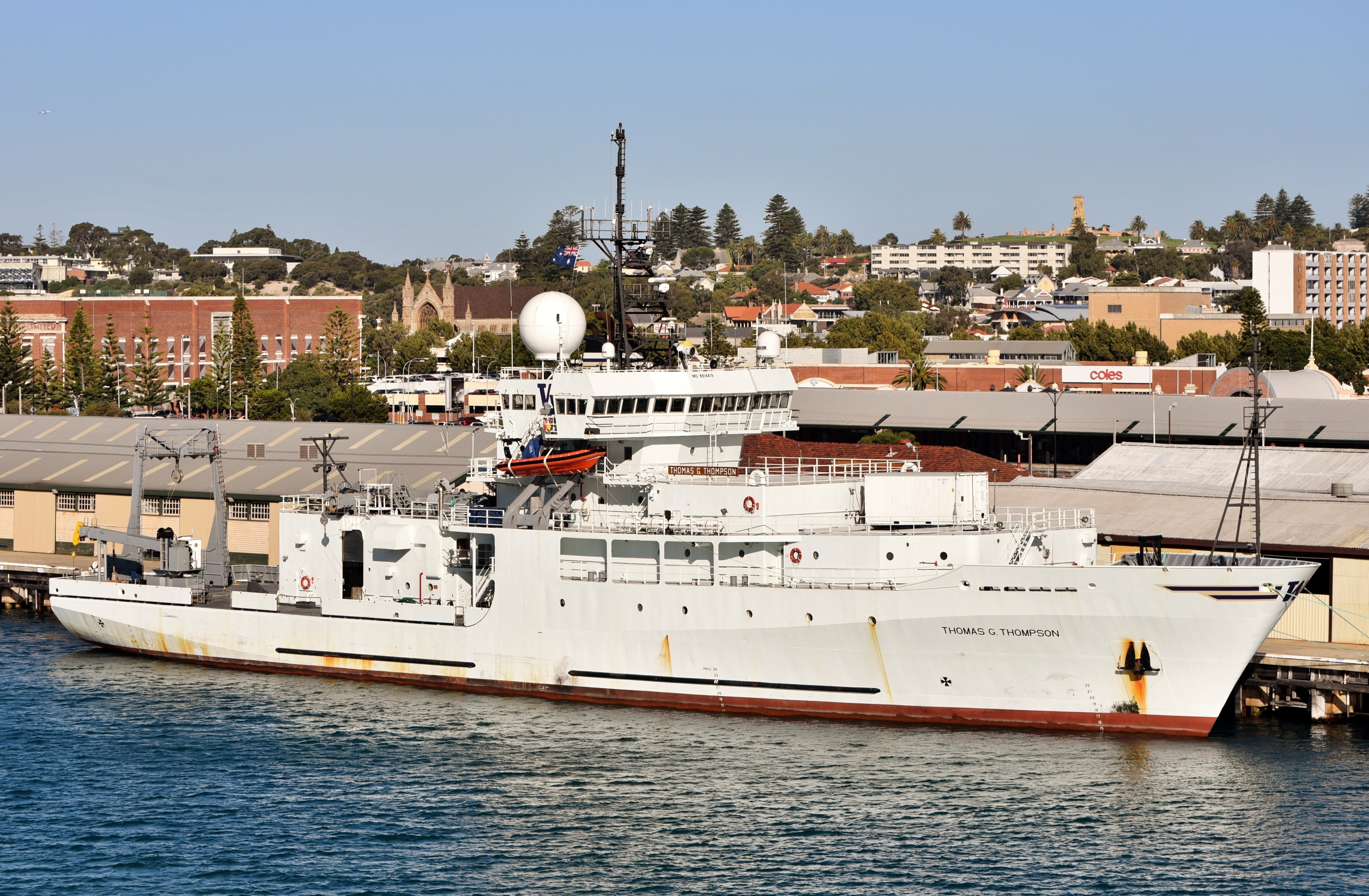
USNS Thomas G. Thompson (T-AGOR-23)

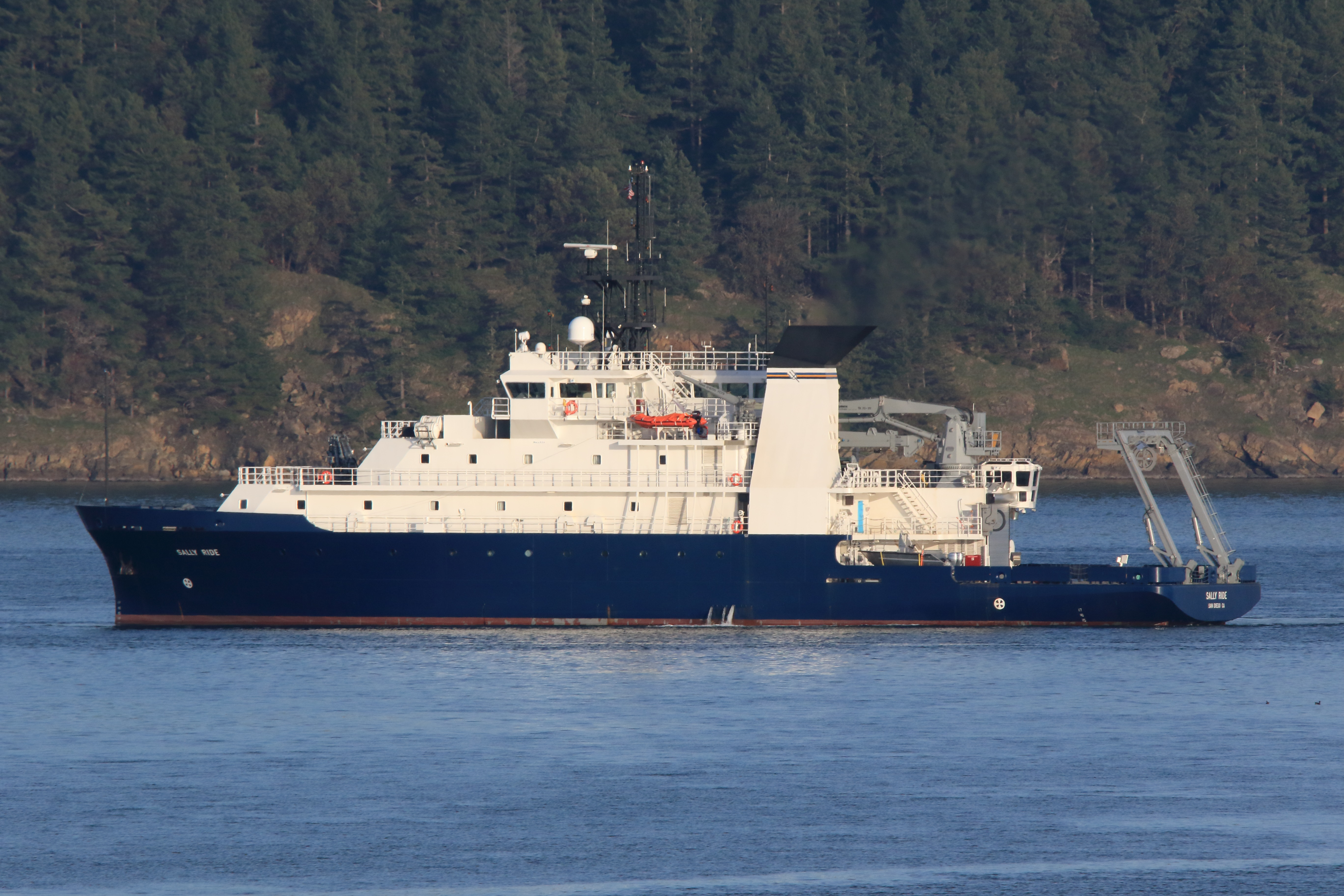
RV Sally Ride (T-AGOR-28)

- USNS Josiah Willard Gibbs (T-AGOR-1), former AVP-51
- T-AGOR-2 built for Norway

Robert D. Conrad-class

- USNS Robert D. Conrad (T-AGOR-3)
- USNS James M. Gilliss (T-AGOR-4)
- USNS Charles H. Davis (T-AGOR-5)
- USNS Sands (T-AGOR-6)
- USNS Lynch (T-AGOR-7)
- USNS Thomas G. Thompson (T-AGOR-9)
- USNS Thomas Washington (T-AGOR-10)
- USNS De Steiguer (T-AGOR-12)
- USNS Bartlett (T-AGOR-13)

Eltanin-class: MC type C1-ME2-13a

- USNS Eltanin (T-AGOR-8), ex-T-AK-270
- USNS Mizar (T-AGOR-11), ex-T-AK-272

Melville-class

- USNS Melville (T-AGOR-14)
- USNS Knorr (T-AGOR-15)

Hayes-class

- USNS Hayes (T-AGOR-16), later T-AG-195

Diver-class

- USNS Chain (T-AGOR-17), former ARS-20
- USNS Snatch (T-AGOR-18), former ARS-27

Gyre-class

- USNS Gyre (T-AGOR-21)
- USNS Moana Wave (T-AGOR-22)

Thomas G. Thompson-class

- USNS Thomas G. Thompson (T-AGOR-23) [A]
- USNS Roger Revelle (T-AGOR-24) [A]
- USNS Atlantis (T-AGOR-25) [A]

Kilo Moana-class

- USNS Kilo Moana (T-AGOR-26) [A]

Neil Armstrong-class

- RV Neil Armstrong (T-AGOR-27) [A]
- RV Sally Ride (T-AGOR-28) [A]

== Ocean surveillance ships (T-AGOS) ==
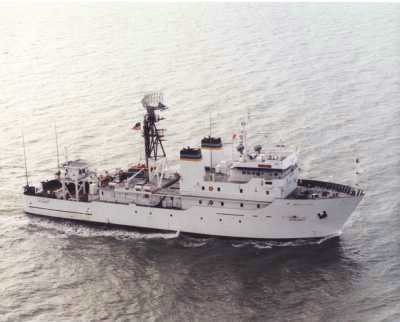
USNS Stalwart (T-AGOS-1)

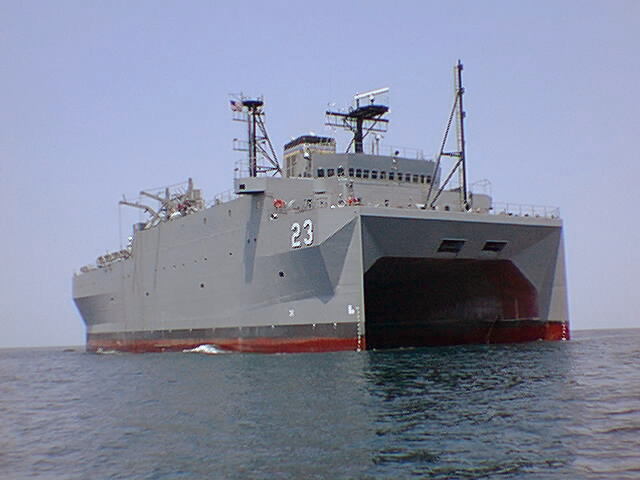
USNS Impeccable (T-AGOS-23)

Underwater acoustics collection vessels.

Stalwart-class

- USNS Stalwart (T-AGOS-1)
- USNS Contender (T-AGOS-2)
- USNS Vindicator (T-AGOS-3)
- USNS Triumph (T-AGOS-4)
- USNS Assurance (T-AGOS-5)
- USNS Persistent (T-AGOS-6)
- USNS Indomitable (T-AGOS-7)
- USNS Prevail (T-AGOS-8), later IX-537
- USNS Assertive (T-AGOS-9)
- USNS Invincible (T-AGOS-10), later T-AGM-24
- USNS Audacious (T-AGOS-11)
- USNS Bold (T-AGOS-12)
- USNS Adventurous (T-AGOS-13)
- USNS Worthy (T-AGOS-14), later USAV Worthy
- USNS Titan (T-AGOS-15)
- USNS Capable (T-AGOS-16)
- USNS Tenacious (T-AGOS-17)
- USNS Relentless (T-AGOS-18)

Victorious-class

- USNS Victorious (T-AGOS-19) [A]
- USNS Able (T-AGOS-20) [A]
- USNS Effective (T-AGOS-21) [A]
- USNS Loyal (T-AGOS-22) [A]

Impeccable-class

- USNS Impeccable (T-AGOS-23) [A]

== Motor torpedo boat tenders (AGP) ==
- USS Niagara (AGP-1), ex-CMc-2, PG-52, sunk by air attack Tulagi 23 May 1943, no fatalities
- USS Hilo (AGP-2), ex-PG-58
- USS Jamestown (AGP-3), ex-PG-55
- USS Portunus (AGP-4), ex-LST-330
- USS Varuna (AGP-5), ex-LST-14
- USS Oyster Bay (AGP-6), ex-AVP-28, later AVP-28
- USS Mobjack (AGP-7), ex-AVP-27, later USC&GS Pioneer
- USS Wachapreague (AGP-8), ex-AVP-56
- USS Willoughby (AGP-9), ex-AVP-57
- USS Orestes (AGP-10), ex-LST-135
- USS Silenus (AGP-11), ex-LST-604
- USS Acontius (AGP-12)
- USS Cyrene (AGP-13)
- USS Alecto (AGP-14). ex-LST-977
- USS Callisto (AGP-15), ex-LST-966
- USS Antigone (AGP-16), ex-LST-773
- USS Brontes (AGP-17), ex-LST-1125
- USS Chiron (AGP-18), ex-LST-1133
- USS Pontus (AGP-20), ex-LST-201
- USS Garrett County (AGP-786), ex-LST-786
- USS Harnett County (AGP-821), ex-LST-821
- USS Hunterdon County (AGP-838), ex-LST-838
- USS Graham County (AGP-1176), ex-LST-1176

== Radar picket ships (AGR) ==
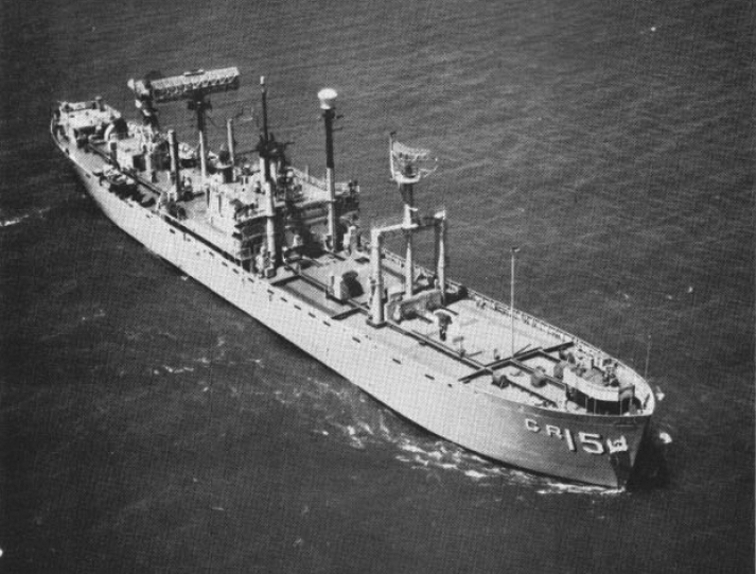
USS Tracer (AGR-15)

Guardian-class: MC type Z-EC2-S-C5

All Guardian-class ships were originally classed as YAGR but were then reclassed as AGR in 1958.

- USS Guardian (AGR-1)
- USS Lookout (AGR-2)
- USS Skywatcher (AGR-3)
- USS Searcher (AGR-4)
- USS Scanner (AGR-5)
- USS Locator (AGR-6)
- USS Picket (AGR-7)
- USS Interceptor (AGR-8)
- USS Investigator (AGR-9)
- USS Outpost (AGR-10)
- USS Protector (AGR-11)
- USS Vigil (AGR-12)
- USS Interdictor (AGR-13)
- USS Interpreter (AGR-14)
- USS Interrupter / Tracer (AGR-15)
- USS Watchman (AGR-16)

== Surveying ships (AGS) ==
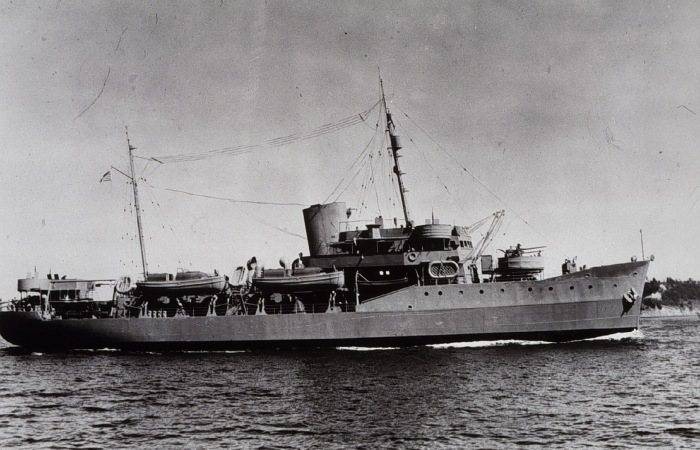
USS Pathfinder (AGS-1)

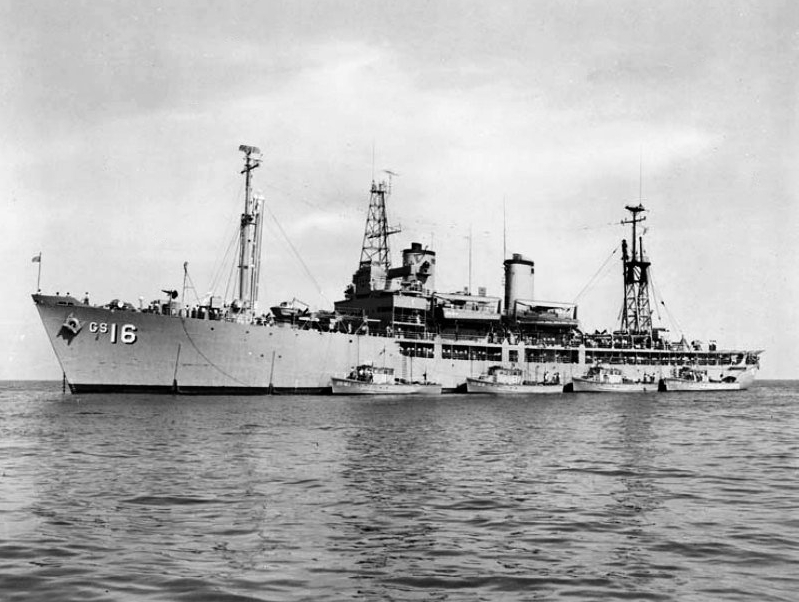
USS Maury (AGS-16)

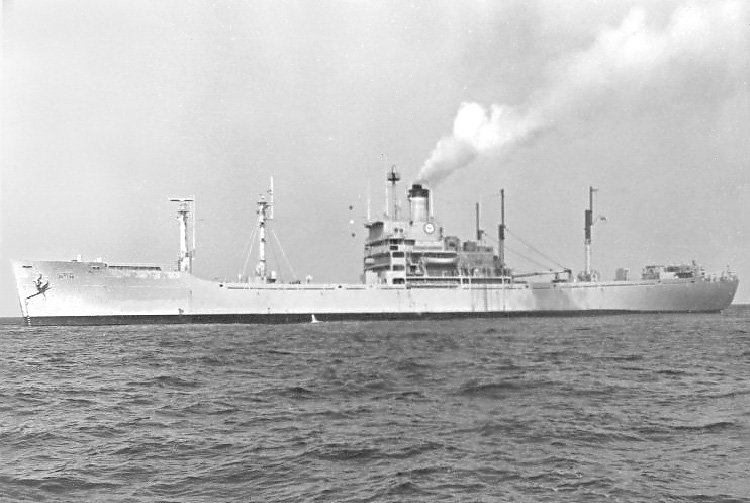
USNS Dutton (T-AGS-22)

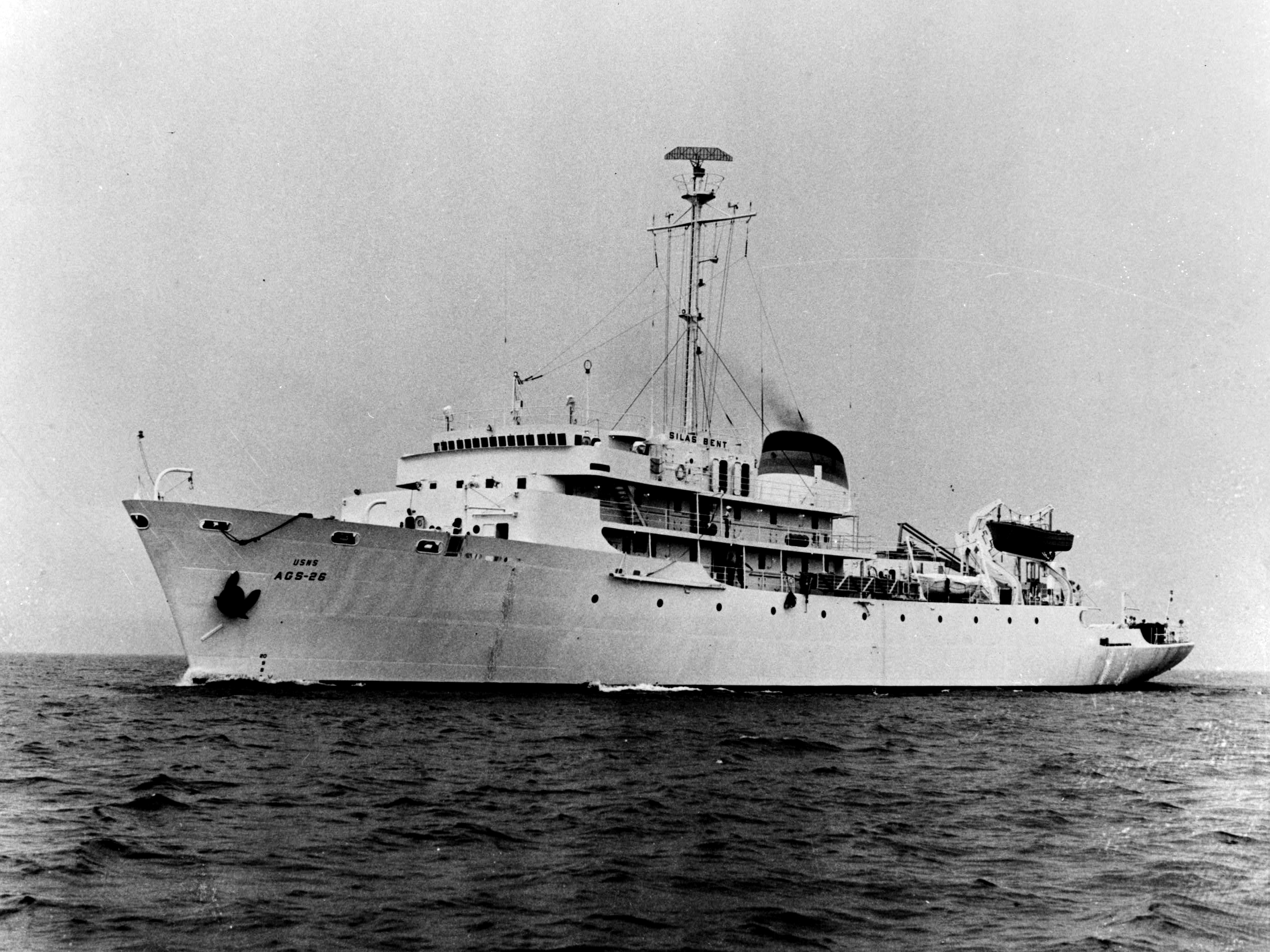
USNS Silas Bent (AGS-26)

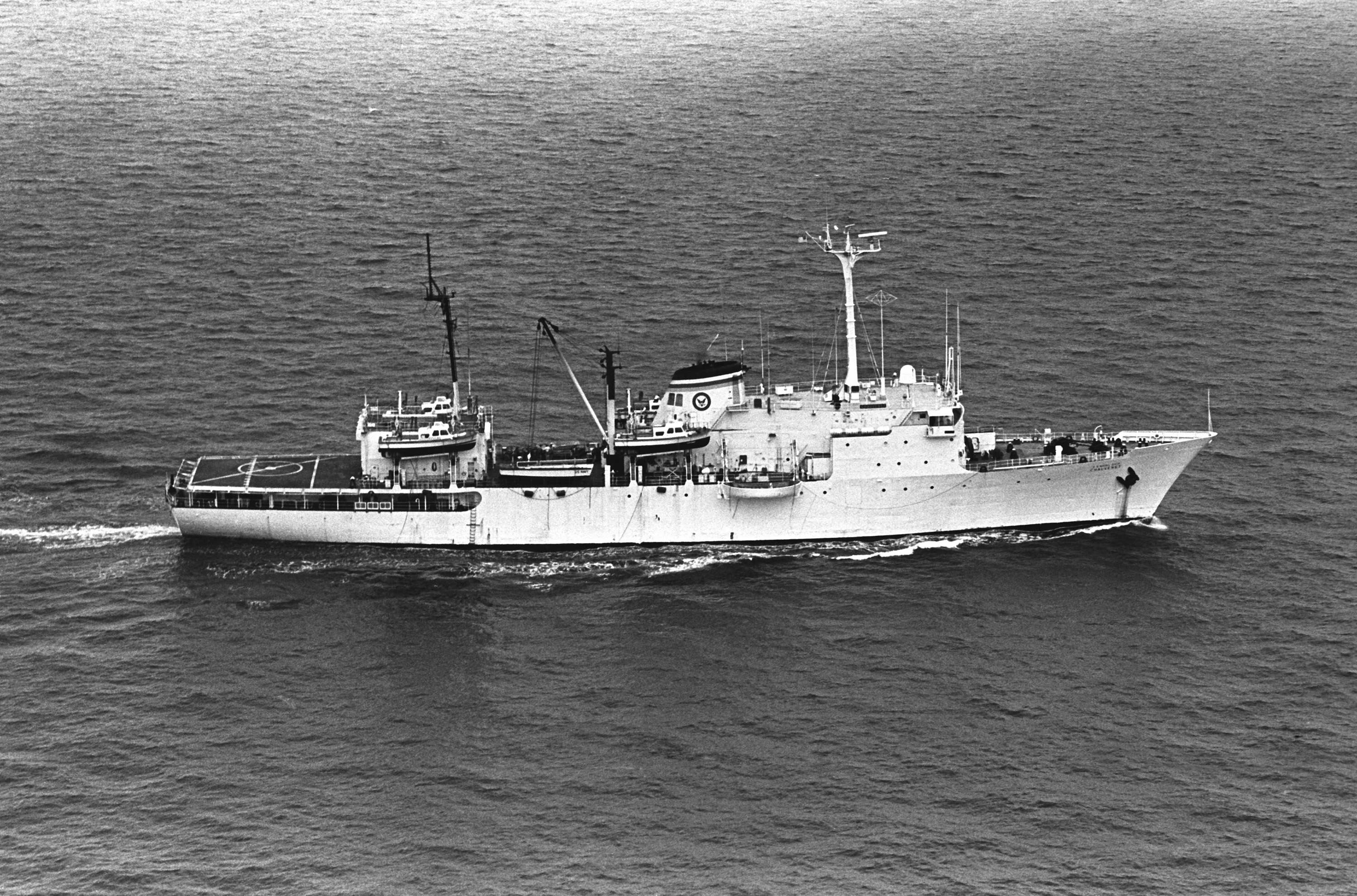
USNS Chauvenet (T-AGS-29)

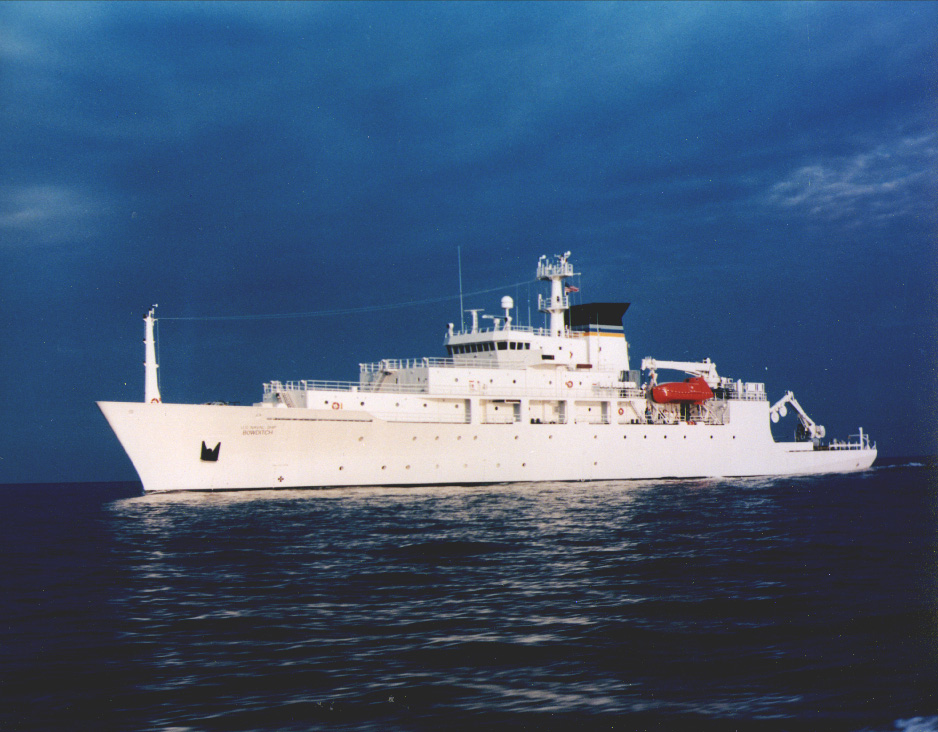
USNS Bowditch (T-AGS-62)

- USS Pathfinder (AGS-1)
- USS Hydrographer (AGS-2)
- USS Oceanographer (AGS-3), ex-SP-159, ex-PG-85
- USS Bowditch (AGS-4), ex-AG-30, Operation Crossroads nuclear test participant,
- USS Sumner (AGS-5), ex-AG-32
- USS Derickson (AGS-6)
- USS Littlehales (AGS-7)
- USS Dutton (AGS-8), ex-PCS-1396, Operation Crossroads participant, later AGSC-8
- USS Amistead Rust (AGS-9)
- USS John Blish (AGS-10), ex-PCS-1457, later AGSC-10

YMS-135-subclass

- USS Chauvenet (AGS-11), ex-YMS-195
- USS Harkness (AGS-12), ex-YMS-242, later AGSC-12
- USS James M. Gilliss (AGS-13), ex-YMS-262, Operation Crossroads participant, later AGSC-13
- USS Simon Newcomb (AGS-14), ex-YMS-263, later AGSC-14

Artemis-class: MC type S4–SE2–BE1

- USS Tanner (AGS-15), ex-AKA-34
- USS Maury (AGS-16), ex-AKA-36

Auk-class

- USS Pursuit (AGS-17), ex-AM-108
- USS Requisite (AGS-18), ex-AM-109
- USS Sheldrake (AGS-19), ex-AM-62
- USS Prevail (AGS-20), ex-AM-107

Bowditch-class: MA type VC2-S-AP3

- USNS Bowditch (T-AGS-21)
- USNS Dutton (T-AGS-22)
- USNS Michelson (T-AGS-23)

Other classes

- USS Seranno (AGS-24)
- USNS Kellar (T-AGS-25)

Silas Bent-class

- USNS Silas Bent (T-AGS-26), Project SHAD chemical/biological test participant
- USNS Kane (T-AGS-27)
- USNS Wilkes (T-AGS-33)
- USNS Wyman (T-AGS-34)

Other classes

- USS Towhee (AGS-28), ex-MSF-388
- USNS Chauvenet (T-AGS-29)
- USS San Pablo (AGS-30), ex-AVP-30
- USNS S. P. Lee (T-AGS-31), Project SHAD participant
- USNS Harkness (T-AGS-32)
- USNS Sgt. George D. Keathley (T-AGS-35), ex-T-APC-117
- USS Coastal Crusader (AGS-36), ex-AK-220, T-AGM-16
- USNS Twin Falls (T-AGS-37), ex-T-AGM-11
- USNS H. H. Hess (T-AGS-38)
- USNS Maury (T-AGS-39), later TS Golden Bear
- USNS Tanner (T-AGS-40)
- USNS Waters (T-AGS-45) [A]
- USS Rehoboth (AGS-50), ex-AVP-50
- USNS John McDonnell (T-AGS-51)
- USNS Littlehales (T-AGS-52)

Pathfinder-class

- USNS Pathfinder (T-AGS-60) [A]
- USNS Sumner (T-AGS-61) [I]
- USNS Bowditch (T-AGS-62) [A]
- USNS Henson (T-AGS-63) [A]
- USNS Bruce C. Heezen (T-AGS-64) [A]
- USNS Mary Sears (T-AGS-65) [A]
- USNS Marie Tharp (T-AGS-66) [A], formerly USNS Maury
- USNS Robert Ballard (T-AGS-67) [P]

== Coastal survey ships (AGSC) ==
- USS Dutton (AGSC-8), ex-AGS-8
- USS John Blish (AGSC-10), ex-AGS-10
- USS Harkness (AGSC-12), ex-AGS-12, later AMCU-12
- USS James M. Gilliss (AGSC-13), ex-AGS-13, later AMCU-13
- USS Simon Newcomb (AGSC-14), ex-AGS-14
- USS Littlehales (AGSC-15), ex-YF-854

== Submarine and special warfare support vessel (T-AGSE) ==
Black Powder-class

- USNS Black Powder (T-AGSE-1) [A]
- USNS Westwind (T-AGSE-2) [A]
- USNS Eagleview (T-AGSE-3) [A]
- USNS Arrowhead (T-AGSE-4) [A]

== Auxiliary submarines (AGSS) ==
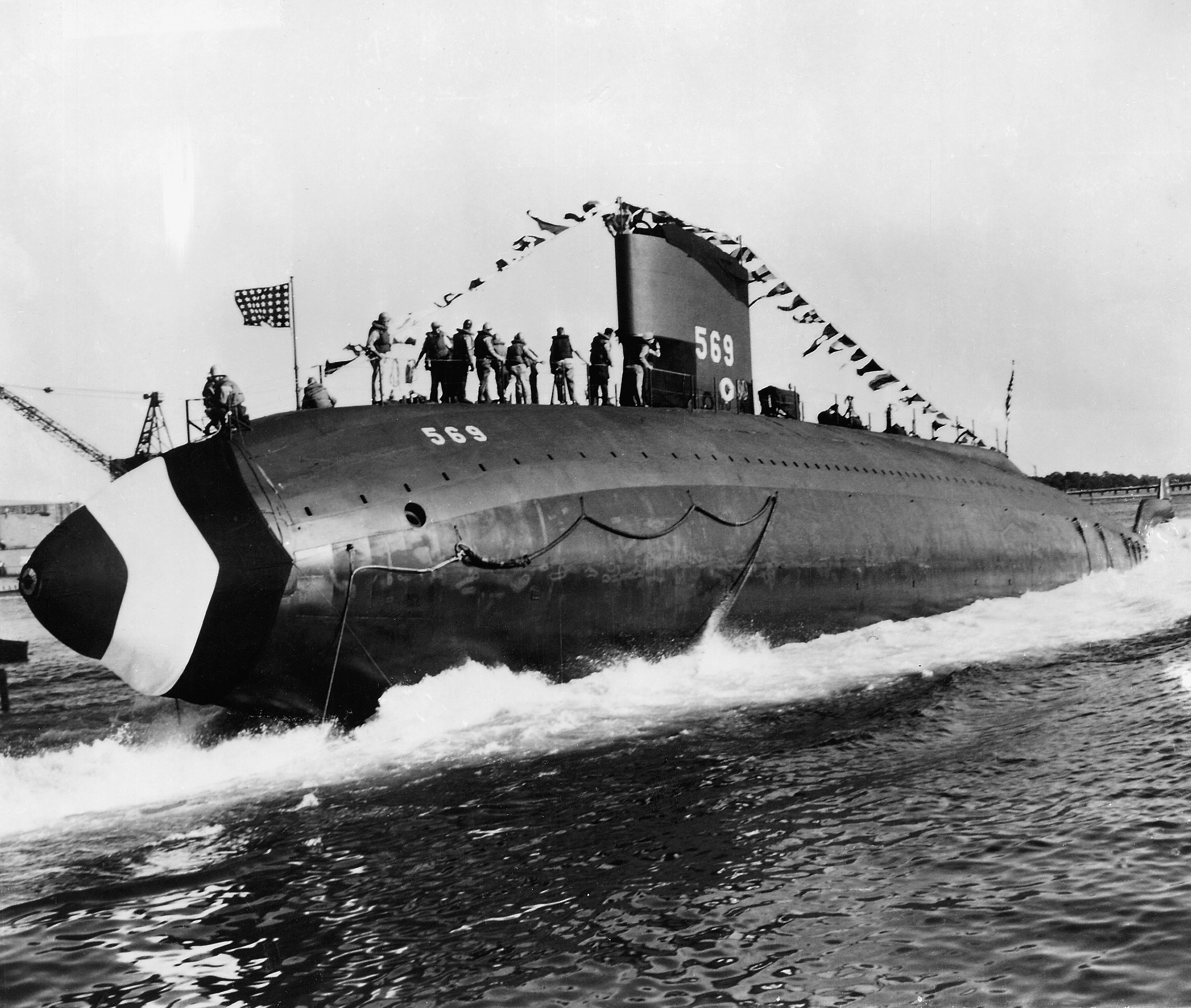
USS Albacore (AGSS-569)

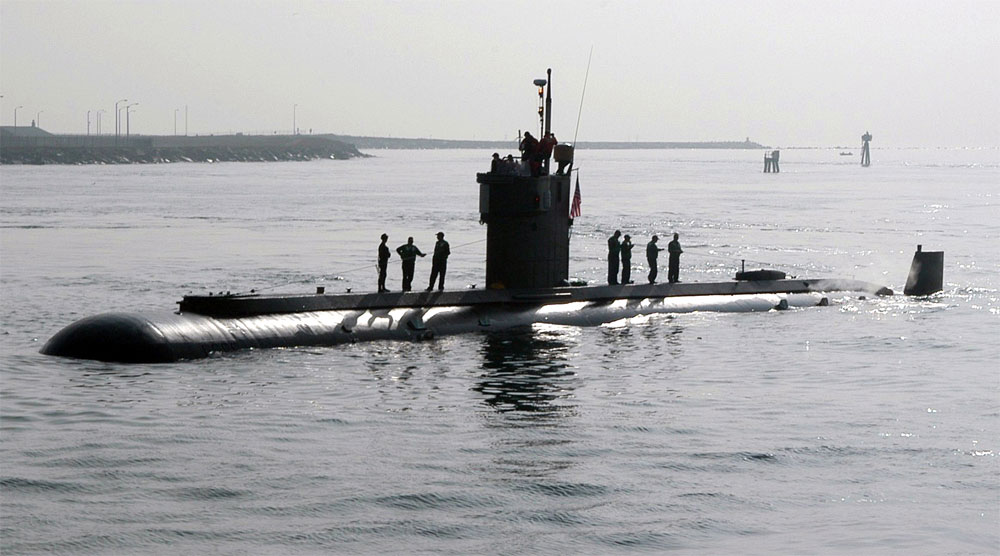
USS Dolphin (AGSS-555)

Gato class

- Cod (AGSS-224), ex-SS-224, later IXSS-224, museum ship
- Rasher (AGSS-269), ex-SS-269, SSR-269, later IXSS-269

Balao class

- Bowfin (AGSS-287), ex-SS-287, later IXSS-287, museum ship
- Ling (AGSS-297), ex-SS-297, later IXSS-297, museum ship
- Lionfish (AGSS-298), ex-SS-298, later IXSS-298, museum ship
- Roncador (AGSS-301), ex-SS-301, later IXSS-301
- Charr (AGSS-328), ex-SS-328, later IXSS-328
- Carp (AGSS-338), ex-SS-338, later IXSS-338
- Chopper (AGSS-342), ex-SS-342, later IXSS-342
- Pampanito (AGSS-383), ex-SS-383, later IXSS-383, museum ship

Tench class

- Torsk (AGSS-423), ex-SS-423, later IXSS-423, museum ship
- Runner (AGSS-476), ex-SS-476, later IXSS-476
- Requin (AGSS-481), ex-SS-481, SSR-481, later IXSS-471, museum ship

Albacore class

- USS Albacore (AGSS-569), museum ship

Dolphin class

- USS Dolphin (AGSS-555), museum ship

== Technical research ships (AGTR) ==
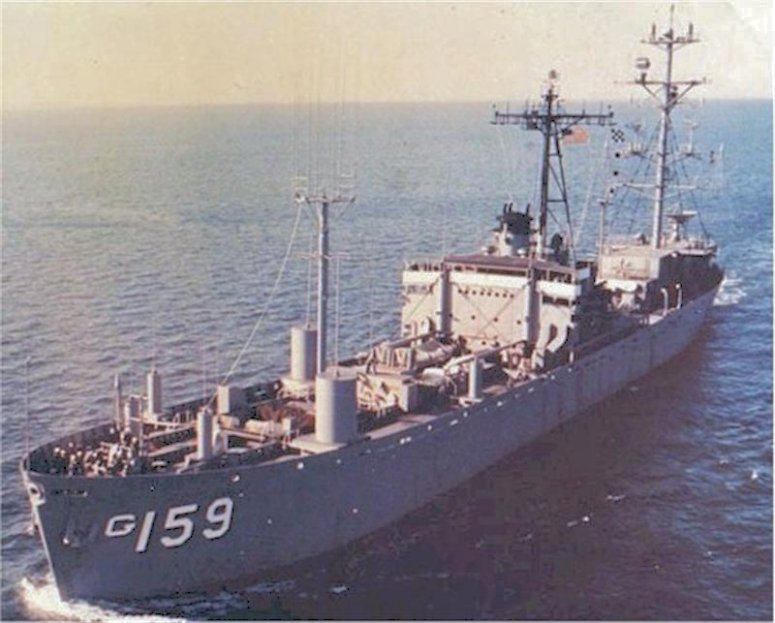
USS Oxford (AG-159 / AGTR-1)

Signals intelligence collection vessels.

Oxford-class: MA type Z–EC2–S–C5

- USS Oxford (AGTR-1), ex-AG-159
- USS Georgetown (AGTR-2), ex-AG-165
- USS Jamestown (AGTR-3), ex-AG-166

Belmont-class: MA type VC2-S-AP3

- USS Belmont (AGTR-4), ex-AG-167
- USS Liberty (AGTR-5), ex-AG-168, damaged on 8 June 1967 by Israeli aircraft and torpedo boats, CTL, 34 killed

== Dry cargo ships (AK, T-AK) ==
- USS Houston (AK-1)
- USS Kittery (AK-2)
- USS Newport News (AK-3)
- USS Bath (AK-4)
- USS Gulfport (AK-5), ex-SP-2989
- USS Beaufort (AK-6), ex-ID-3008
- USS Pensacola (AK-7), later AG-13
- USS Astoria (AK-8), ex-ID-2005
- USS Long Beach (AK-9), ex-ID-2136
- USS Quincy (AK-10)
- USS Robert L. Barnes (AK-11), ex-ID-3088, later AO-14, AG-27
- USS Arcturus (AK-12) / USS Gold Star (AK-12), later AG-12
- USS Capella (AK-13)
- USS Regulus (AK-14)
- USS Sirius (AK-15)
- USS Spica (AK-16)
- USS Vega (AK-17)
- USS Arcturus (AK-18), later AKA-1
- USS Procyon (AK-19), later AKA-2
- USS Bellatrix (AK-20), later AKA-3
- USS Electra (AK-21), later AKA-4
- USS Fomalhaut (AK-22), later AKA-5, AE-20
- USS Alchiba (AK-23), later AKA-6
- USS Alcyone (AK-24), later AKA-7
- USS Algorab (AK-25), later AKA-8
- USS Alhena (AK-26), later AKA-9
- USS Almaack (AK-27), later AKA-10
- USS Betelgeuse (AK-28), later AKA-11
- USS Delta (AK-29), later AR-9
- USS Hamul (AK-30), later AD-20
- USS Markab (AK-31), later AD-21, AR-23
- John R. R. Hannay (AK-32), not commissioned
- West Elcasco (AK-33), ex-ID-3661, not commissioned, later AE-7
- Meigs (AK-34), ex-ID-4490, not commissioned
- Liberty (AK-35), ex-ID-3461, not commissioned
- Ludington (AK-37), not commissioned
- Edenton (AK-38), ex-ID-3696, not commissioned
- USS Mendocino (AK-39)
- USS Hercules (AK-41)
- USS Mercury (AK-42)
- USS Jupiter (AK-43), later AVS-8
- USS Aroostook (AK-44), ex-ID-1256, ex-CM-3
- USS Stratford (AK-45)
- USS Pleiades (AK-46)
- USS Aquila (AK-47)
- USS Pegasus (AK-48)
- USS Saturn (AK-49), later AF-40
- USS Aries (AK-51), ex-AG-37
- USS Matinicus (AK-52), ex-AG-38, later AP-75
- USS Libra (AK-53), later AKA-12
- USS Pollux (AK-54), later AKS-4
- USS Titana (AK-55), later AKA-13
- USS Oberon (AK-56), later AKA-14
- USS Thomas Jefferson (AK-57)
- USS Kopara (AK-62), later AG-50
- USS Asterion (AK-63)
- USS Andromeda (AK-64), later AKA-15
- USS Aquarius (AK-65), later AKA-16
- USS Centaurus (AK-66), later AKA-17
- USS Cepheus (AK-67), later AKA-18
- USS Thuban (AK-68), later AKA-19
- USS Virgo (AK-69), later AKA-20, AE-30
- USS Crater (AK-70)
- USS Adhara (AK-71)
- USS Aludra (AK-72)
- USS Arided (AK-73)
- USS Carina (AK-74)
- USS Cassiopeia (AK-75)
- USS Celeno (AK-76)
- USS Cetus (AK-77)
- USS Deimos (AK-78)
- USS Draco (AK-79)
- USS Enceladus (AK-80)
- Europa (AK-81) (not commissioned)
- USS Hydra (AK-82)
- Media (AK-83) (not commissioned)
- Mira (AK-84) (not commissioned)
- Nashira (AK-85) (not commissioned)
- Norma (AK-86) (not commissioned)
- USNS Sagitta (T-AK-87)
- Tucana (AK-88) (not commissioned)
- USS Vela (AK-89)
- USS Albireo (AK-90)
- USS Cor Caroli (AK-91)
- USS Eridanus (AK-92)
- USS Etamin (AK-93)
- USS Mintaka (AK-94)
- USS Murzim (AK-95)
- USS Sterope (AK-96)
- USS Serpens (AK-97), destroyed by explosion 29 January 1945, 255 killed
- USS Auriga (AK-98)
- USS Bootes (AK-99)
- USS Lynx (AK-100)
- USS Asterion (AK-100) – duplicate number for Q-ship (armed decoy), ex-ID-2228
- USS Lyra (AK-101)
- USS Atik (AK-101) – duplicate number for Q-ship (armed decoy), sunk by torpedo 26 March 1942, ex-ID-1608
- USS Triangulum (AK-102)
- USS Sculptor (AK-103)
- USS Ganymede (AK-104)
- USS Naos (AK-105)
- USS Caelum (AK-106)
- USS Hyperion (AK-107)
- USS Rotanin (AK-108)
- USS Allioth (AK-109), later IX-204, AVS-4
- USS Alkes (AK-110)
- USS Giansar (AK-111)
- USS Grumium (AK-112), later IX-174, AVS-3
- USS Rutilicus (AK-113)
- USS Alkaid (AK-114)
- USS Crux (AK-115)
- USS Alderamin (AK-116)
- USS Zaurak (AK-117)
- USS Shaula (AK-118)
- USS Matar (AK-119)
- USS Zaniah (AK-120), later AG-70
- USS Sabik (AK-121)
- USS Baham (AK-122), later AG-71
- USS Menkar (AK-123)
- USS Azimech (AK-124)
- USS Lesuth (AK-125)
- USS Megrez (AK-126)
- USS Alnitah (AK-127)
- USS Leonis (AK-128)
- USS Phobos (AK-129)
- USS Arkab (AK-130)
- USS Melucta (AK-131)
- USS Propus (AK-132)
- USS Seginus (AK-133)
- USS Syrma (AK-134)
- USS Venus (AK-135)
- USS Ara (AK-136)
- USS Ascella (AK-137)
- USS Cheleb (AK-138)
- USS Pavo (AK-139)
- USS Situla (AK-140)
- USS Alamosa (AK-156)
- USS Alcona (AK-157)
- USS Amador (AK-158)
- USS Antrim (AK-159)
- USS Autauga (AK-160)
- USS Beaverhead (AK-161)
- USS Beltrami (AK-162)
- USS Blount (AK-163)
- USS Brevard (AK-164)
- USS Bullock (AK-165)
- USS Cabell (AK-166)
- USS Caledonia (AK-167)
- USS Charlevoix (AK-168)
- USS Chatham (AK-169)
- USS Chicot (AK-170)
- USS Claiborne (AK-171)
- USS Clarion (AK-172)
- USS Codington (AK-173)
- USS Colquitt (AK-174)
- USS Craighead (AK-175)
- USS Doddridge (AK-176) (cancelled 8/16/45)
- USS Duval (AK-177) (cancelled 8/16/45)
- USS Fairfield (AK-178)
- USS Faribault (AK-179)
- USS Fentress (AK-180)
- USS Flagler (AK-181)
- USS Gadsden (AK-182)
- USS Glacier (AK-183)
- USS Grainger (AK-184)
- USS Gwinnett (AK-185), later AG-92, AVS-5
- USS Habersham (AK-186)
- USS Hennepin (AK-187)
- USS Herkimer (AK-188)
- USS Hidalgo (AK-189)
- USS Kenosha (AK-190)
- USS Lebanon (AK-191)
- USS Lehigh (AK-192)
- USS Lancaster (AK-193)
- USS Marengo (AK-194)
- USS Midland (AK-195)
- USS Minidoka (AK-196)
- USS Muscatine (AK-197)
- USS Muskingum (AK-198)
- USS Nicollet (AK-199), later AG-93, AVS-6
- USS Pembina (AK-200)
- USS Pemiscot (AK-201)
- USS Pinellas (AK-202)
- USS Pipestone (AK-203)
- USS Pitkin (AK-204)
- USS Poinsett (AK-205)
- USS Pontotoc (AK-206), later AG-94, AVS-7
- USS Richland (AK-207)
- USS Rockdale (AK-208)
- USS Schuyler (AK-209)
- USS Screven (AK-210)
- USS Sebastian (AK-211)
- USS Somerset (AK-212)
- USS Sussex (AK-213)
- USS Tarrant (AK-214)
- USS Tipton (AK-215)
- USS Traverse (AK-216) (cancelled 8/45)
- USS Tulare (AK-217) (cancelled 8/45)
- USS Washtenaw (AK-218)
- USS Westchester (AK-219) (cancelled 8/45)
- USS Wexford (AK-220), later T-AGM-16, AGS-36
- USS Kenmore (AK-221), ex-AP-162
- USS Livingston (AK-222), ex-AP-163
- USS De Grasse (AK-223), ex-AP-164
- USS Prince Georges (AK-224), ex-AP-165
- USS Allegan (AK-225)
- USS Appanoose (AK-226)
- USS Boulder Victory (AK-227)
- USS Provo Victory (AK-228)
- USS Las Vegas Victory (AK-229)
- USS Manderson Victory (AK-230)
- USS Bedford Victory (AK-231)
- USS Mayfield Victory (AK-232)
- USS Newcastle Victory (AK-233)
- USS Bucyrus Victory (AK-234)
- USS Red Oak Victory (AK-235)
- USS Lakewood Victory (AK-236)
- USNS Greenville Victory (T-AK-237)
- USNS Haiti Victory (T-AK-238)
- USNS Kingsport Victory (T-AK-239), later T-AG-164
- USNS Private John R. Towle (T-AK-240)
- USNS Private Francis X. McGraw (T-AK-241)
- USNS Sgt. Andrew Miller (T-AK-242)
- USNS Sgt. Archer T. Gammon (T-AK-243)
- USNS Sgt. Morris E. Crain (T-AK-244)
- USNS Captain Arlo L. Olson (T-AK-245)
- USNS Col. William J. O'Brien (T-AK-246)
- USNS Private John F. Thorson (T-AK-247)
- USNS Sgt. George Peterson (T-AK-248)
- USNS Short Splice (T-AK-249)
- USNS Private Frank J. Petrarca (T-AK-250), Operation Dominic nuclear test participant
- USNS Lt. George W. G. Boyce (T-AK-251)
- USNS Lt. Robert Craig (T-AK-252)
- USNS Private Joe E. Mann (T-AK-253)
- USNS Sgt. Truman Kimbro (T-AK-254)
- USNS Private Leonard C. Brostrom (T-AK-255)
- USNS Dalton Victory (T-AK-256)
- USS Altair (AK-257)
- USS Antares (AK-258)
- USS Alcor (AK-259)
- USS Betelgeuse (AK-260)
- USS Alchiba (AK-261)
- USS Algorab (AK-262)
- USS Aquarius (AK-263)
- USS Centaurus (AK-264)
- USS Cepheus (AK-265)
- USS Serpens (AK-266)
- USNS Marine Fiddler (T-AK-267)
- USNS Comet (T-AK-269)
- USNS Eltanin (T-AK-270)
- USNS Mirfak (T-AK-271)
- USNS Mizar (T-AK-272), later T-AGOR-11
- USNS Taurus (T-AK-273), ex-LSD-23, later T-LSV-8
- USNS Lt. James E. Robinson (T-AK-274), ex-T-AG-170
- USNS Pvt. Joseph F. Merrell (T-AK-275)
- USNS Sgt. Jack J. Pendleton (T-AK-276), grounded 23 September 1973, CTL
- USNS Schuyler Otis Bland (T-AK-277)
- USNS Norwalk (T-AK-279)
- USNS Furman (T-AK-280)
- USNS Victoria (T-AK-281)
- USNS Marshfield (T-AK-282)
- USNS Wyandot (T-AK-283), ex-T-AKA-92
- USNS Northern Light (T-AK-284)
- USNS Southern Cross (T-AK-285)
- USNS Vega (T-AK-286)
- USNS Algol (T-AK-287), later T-AKR-287
- USNS Bellatrix (T-AK-288), later T-AKR-288
- USNS Denebola (T-AK-289), later T-AKR-289
- USNS Pollux (T-AK-290), later T-AKR-290
- USNS Altair (T-AK-291), later T-AKR-291
- USNS Regulus (T-AK-292), later T-AKR-292
- USNS Capella (T-AK-293), later T-AKR-293
- USNS Antares (T-AK-294), later T-AKR-294
- MV Merlin (T-AK-323)/MV TSgt John A. Chapman (T-AK-323)
- USNS Cleveland (T-AK-851)
- USNS Austral Rainbow (T-AK-1005)
- USNS Cape Nome (T-AK-1014)
- USNS Marine Adder (T-AK-2005), ex-T-AP-193
- USNS Pioneer Commander (T-AK-2016)
- USNS Pioneer Contractor (T-AK-2018)
- USNS Pioneer Crusader (T-AK-2019)
- USNS Buyer (T-AK-2033)
- USNS Gulf Shipper (T-AK-2035)
- USNS Gulf Trader (T-AK-2036)
- SS Cape Girardeau (AK-2039)
- SS Cape Orlando (T-AKR-2044)
- USNS Green Valley (T-AK-2049)
- USNS Green Wave (T-AK-2050)
- USNS American Cormorant (T-AK-2062)
- USNS Green Harbour (T-AK-2064)
- MV Cpl. Louis J. Hauge Jr. (T-AK-3000)
- MV PFC William B. Baugh (T-AK-3001)
- MV PFC James Anderson Jr. (T-AK-3002)
- MV 1st Lt. Alex Bonnyman (T-AK-3003)
- MV Pvt. Franklin J. Phillips (T-AK-3004)
- USNS Sgt. Matej Kocak (T-AK-3005) [I]
- USNS PFC Eugene A. Obregon (T-AK-3006) [I]
- USNS Maj. Stephen W. Pless (T-AK-3007) [I]
- USNS 2nd Lt John P. Bobo (T-AK-3008) [I]
- MV PFC Dewayne T. Williams (T-AK-3009) [A]
- MV 1st Lt. Baldomero Lopez (AK-3010) [A]
- MV 1st Lt. Jack Lummus (AK-3011) [A]
- MV Sgt. William R. Button (AK-3012) [A]
- USNS 1st Lt. Harry L. Martin (T-AK-3015)
- USNS LCPL Roy M. Wheat (T-AK-3016)
- USNS GySgt. Fred W. Stockham (T-AK-3017), ex-T-AKR-299 as Soderman
- MV Capt. Steven L. Bennett (T-AK-4296)
- MV Maj Bernard F. Fisher (T-AK-4396) [A]
- MV LTC John U.D. Page (T-AK-4496)
- MV SSG Edward A. Carter (T-AK-4544)
- MV A1C William H. Pitsenbarger (T-AK-4638)
- MV American Tern (T-AK-4729)
- USNS Cape Adventurer (T-AK-5005)
- USNS Cape Aide (T-AK-5006)
- USNS Cape Ambassador (T-AK-5007)
- USNS Banner (T-AK-5008)
- USNS Cape Ann (T-AK-5009) [I]
- USNS Cape Avinoff (T-AK-5013) [I]
- USNS Agent (T-AK-5015)
- USNS Lake (T-AK-5016)
- USNS Pride (T-AK-5017)
- USNS Scan (T-AK-5018)
- USNS Courier (T-AK-5019)
- USNS Cape John (T-AK-5022)
- USNS Del Viento (T-AK-5026)
- SS Cape Jacob (T-AK-5029) [I]
- USNS Cape Chalmers (T-AK-5036) [I]
- USNS Cape Canso (T-AK-5037)
- USNS Cape Charles (T-AK-5038)
- USNS Cape Clear (T-AK-5039)
- USNS Cape Canaveral (T-AK-5040)
- USNS Cape Cod (T-AK-5041)
- USNS Cape Carthage (T-AK-5042)
- USNS Cape Catoche (T-AK-5043)
- USNS Gulf Banker (T-AK-5044)
- USNS Gulf Farmer (T-AK-5045)
- USNS Gulf Merchant (T-AK-5046)
- USNS Del Monte (T-AK-5049) [I]
- USNS Del Valle (T-AK-5050)
- SS Cape Gibson (AK-5051)
- USNS Cape Bover (T-AK-5057) [I]
- SS Cape Bon (T-AK-5059)
- SS Cape Fear (T-AK-5061) [I]
- SS Cape Flattery (AK-5070) [I]
- SS Cape Florida (AK-5071)
- SS Cape Farewell (AK-5073)
- USNS Cape Catawba (T-AK-5074)
- SS Cape Juby (T-AK-5077) [I]
- USNS LTC Calvin P. Titus (T-AK-5089)
- USNS SP5 Eric G. Gibson (T-AK-5091)
- MV Mohegan (T-AK-5158) [A]
- MV Capt. David I. Lyon (T-AK-5362) [A]
- MT SLNC Corsica (T-AK-5423) [A]
- USNS Jeb Stuart (T-AK-9204)
- MV Strong Virginian (T-AK-9205)
- USNS Buffalo Soldier (T-AK-9301)
- USNS American Merlin (T-AK-9302)
- MV Baffin Strait (T-AK-W9519)
- USNS American Kestrel (T-AK-9651)
- USNS Noble Star (T-AK-9653)
- USNS Green Ridge (T-AK-9655)
- USNS Advantage (T-AK-9682)

== Cargo ship dock (T-AKD) ==
The Point Barrow was similar in design to the amphibious warfare Landing Ships Dock (LSD)s, but with a hull strengthened for sailing in Arctic ice.

- USNS Point Barrow (T-AKD-1), Operation Dominic nuclear test participant, later T-AGDS-2 as Point Loma

== Advanced auxiliary dry cargo ships (T-AKE) ==
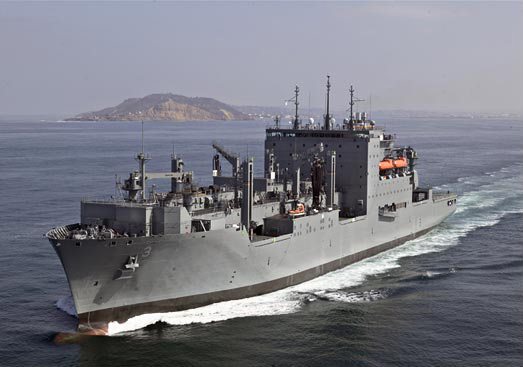
USNS Alan Shepard (T-AKE-3)

Advanced Auxiliary Dry Cargo Ships (T-AKE) are designed to deliver ammunition, provisions, stores, spare parts, potable water and petroleum products via underway replenishment; they effectively combine the missions of Ammunition Ships (AE) and Combat Stores Ships (AFS, T-AFS) along with a limited refueling capability.

Lewis and Clark-class

- USNS Lewis and Clark (T-AKE-1) [A]
- USNS Sacagawea (T-AKE-2) [A]
- USNS Alan Shepard (T-AKE-3) [A]
- USNS Richard E. Byrd (T-AKE-4) [A]
- USNS Robert E. Peary (T-AKE-5) [A]
- USNS Amelia Earhart (T-AKE-6) [A]
- USNS Carl Brashear (T-AKE-7) [A]
- USNS Wally Schirra (T-AKE-8) [A]
- USNS Matthew Perry (T-AKE-9) [A]
- USNS Charles Drew (T-AKE-10) [A]
- USNS Washington Chambers (T-AKE-11) [A]
- USNS William McLean (T-AKE-12) [A]
- USNS Medgar Evers (T-AKE-13) [A]
- USNS Cesar Chavez (T-AKE-14) [A]

== Small cargo ships (AKL) ==
- USS Camano (AKL-1), ex-AG-130
- USS Deal (AKL-2), ex-AG-131
- USS Elba (AKL-3), ex-AG-132
- USS Errol (AKL-4), ex-AG-133
- USS Estero (AKL-5), ex-AG-134
- USS Jekyl (AKL-6), ex-AG-135
- USS Metomkin (AKL-7), ex-AG-136
- USS Roque (AKL-8), ex-AG-137
- USS Ryer (AKL-9), ex-AG-138
- USS Sharps (AKL-10), ex-AG-139
- USS Torry (AKL-11), ex-AG-140
- USS Mark (AKL-12), ex-AG-143
- USNS Tingles (T-AKL-13)
- USS Hewell (AKL-14), ex-AG-145
- USS AKL-15
- USS AKL-16
- USNS New Bedford (AKL-17), later IX-308
- USS AKL-18
- USS AKL-19
- USNS T-AKL-20
- USS AKL-21
- USS AKL-22
- USS AKL-23
- USS AKL-24
- USS Banner (AKL-25), later AGER-1
- USS AKL-26
- USNS T-AKL-27
- USS Brule (AKL-28)
- USS AKL-29
- USNS AKL-30 (T-AKL-30)
- USS AKL-31
- USS AKL-32
- USS AKL-33
- USS AKL-34
- USS AKL-35
- USS AKL-36
- USS Alcyone (AKL-37)
- USS Alhena (AKL-38)
- USS Almaack (AKL-39)
- USS Deimos (AKL-40)
- USS AKL-41
- USS Renate (AKL-42)
- USS AKL-43
- USS Pueblo (AKL-44), later AGER-2 [I]
- USS Palm Beach (AKL-45), later AGER-3
- USNS Redbud (T-AKL-398), ex-WLB-398

== Net cargo ships (AKN) ==
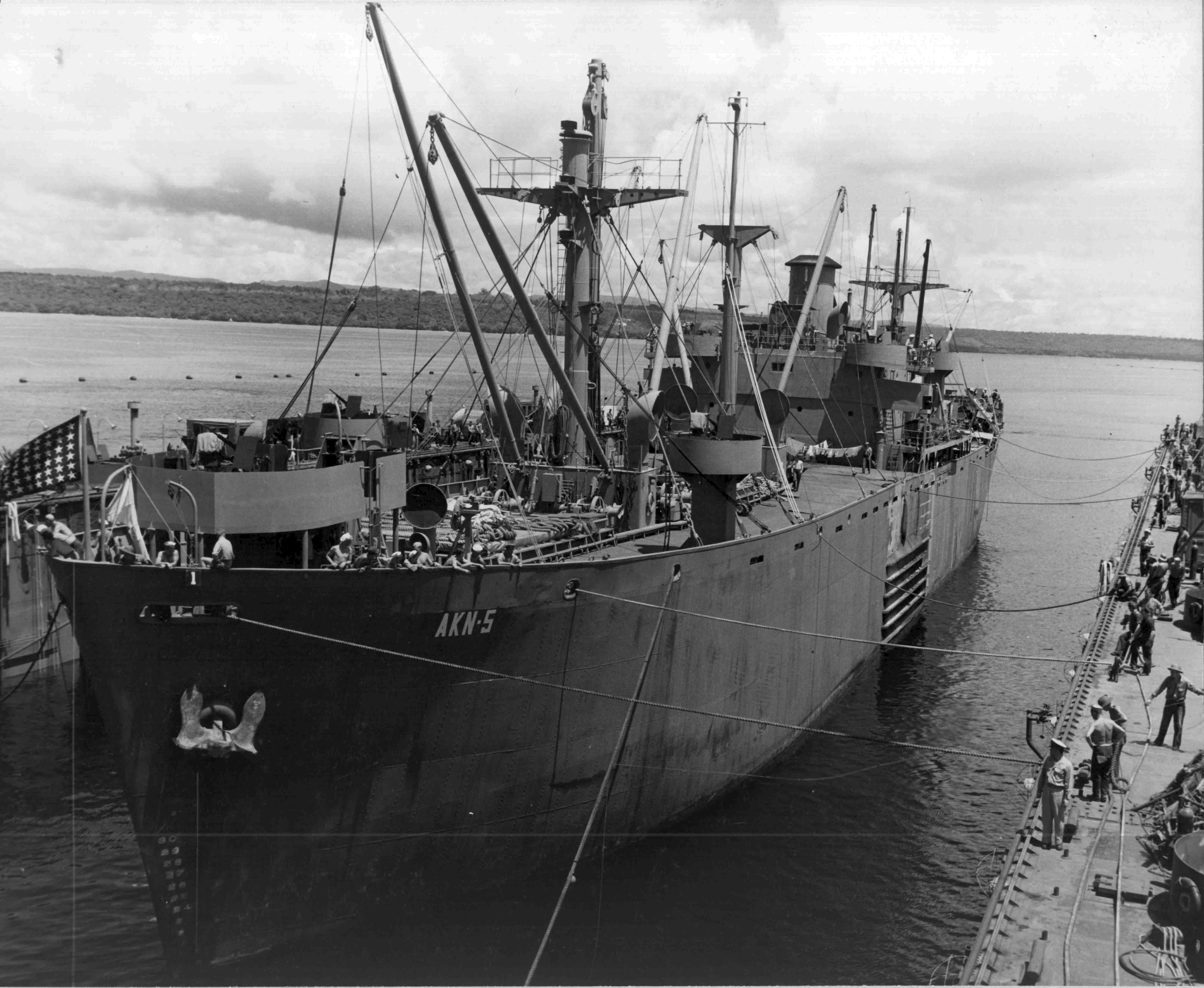
USS Zebra (AKN-5)

Indus class: MC type EC2-S-C1

- USS Indus (AKN-1)
- USS Sagittarius (AKN-2)
- USS Tuscana (AKN-3)
- USS Zebra (AKN-5), ex-IX-107

Other classes

- USS Keokuk (AKN-4), ex-AN-5, ex-CM-8, ex-CMc-6
- USS Galilea (AKN-6), ex-Montauk (LSV-6)

== Vehicle cargo ships (T-AKR) ==
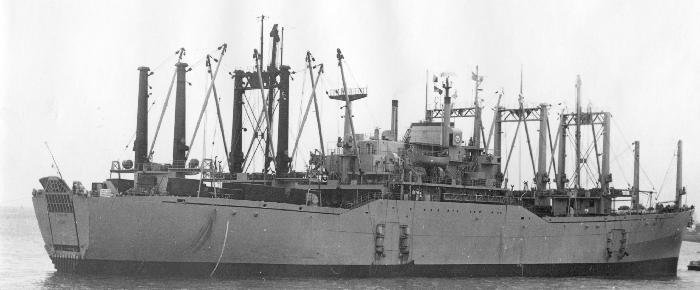
USNS Comet (T-AK-269)

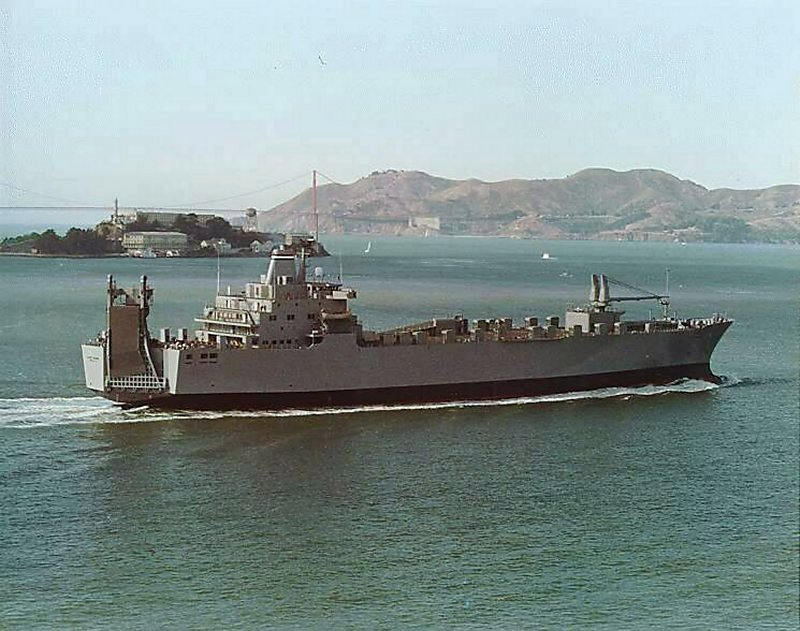
SS Cape Island (T-AKR-10)

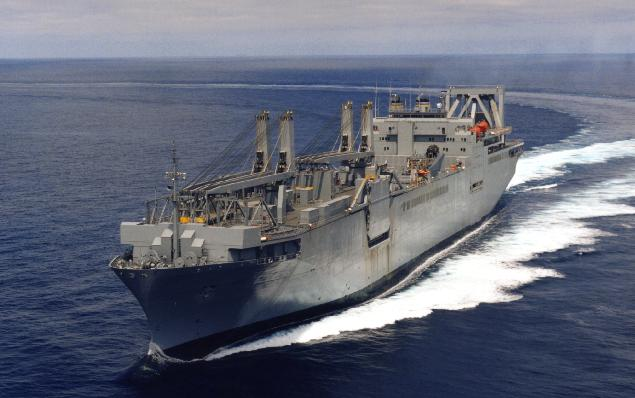
USNS Shughart (T-AKR-295)

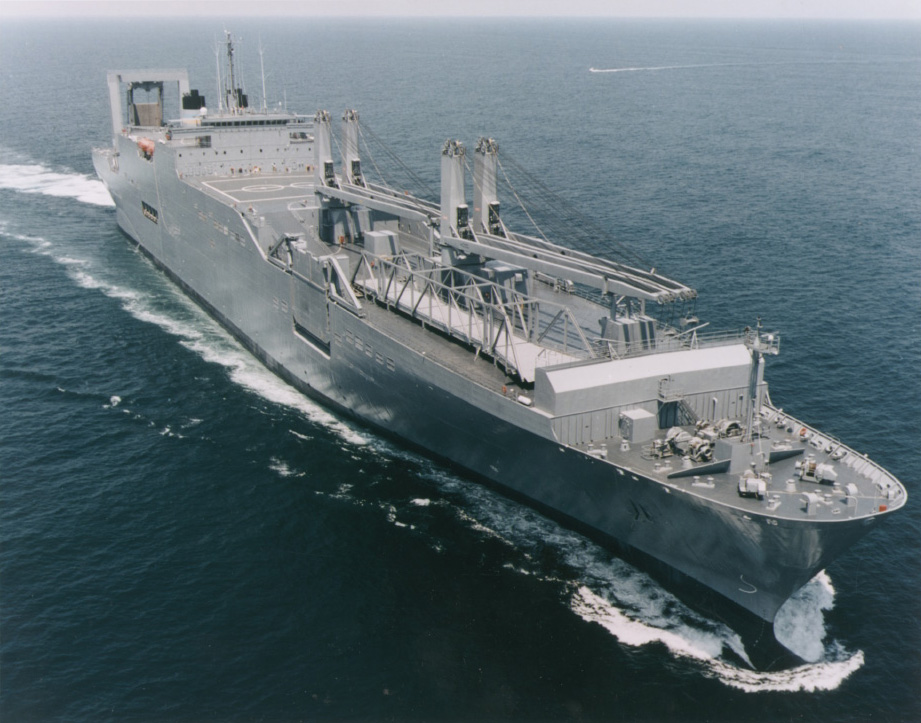
USNS Gordon (T-AKR 296)

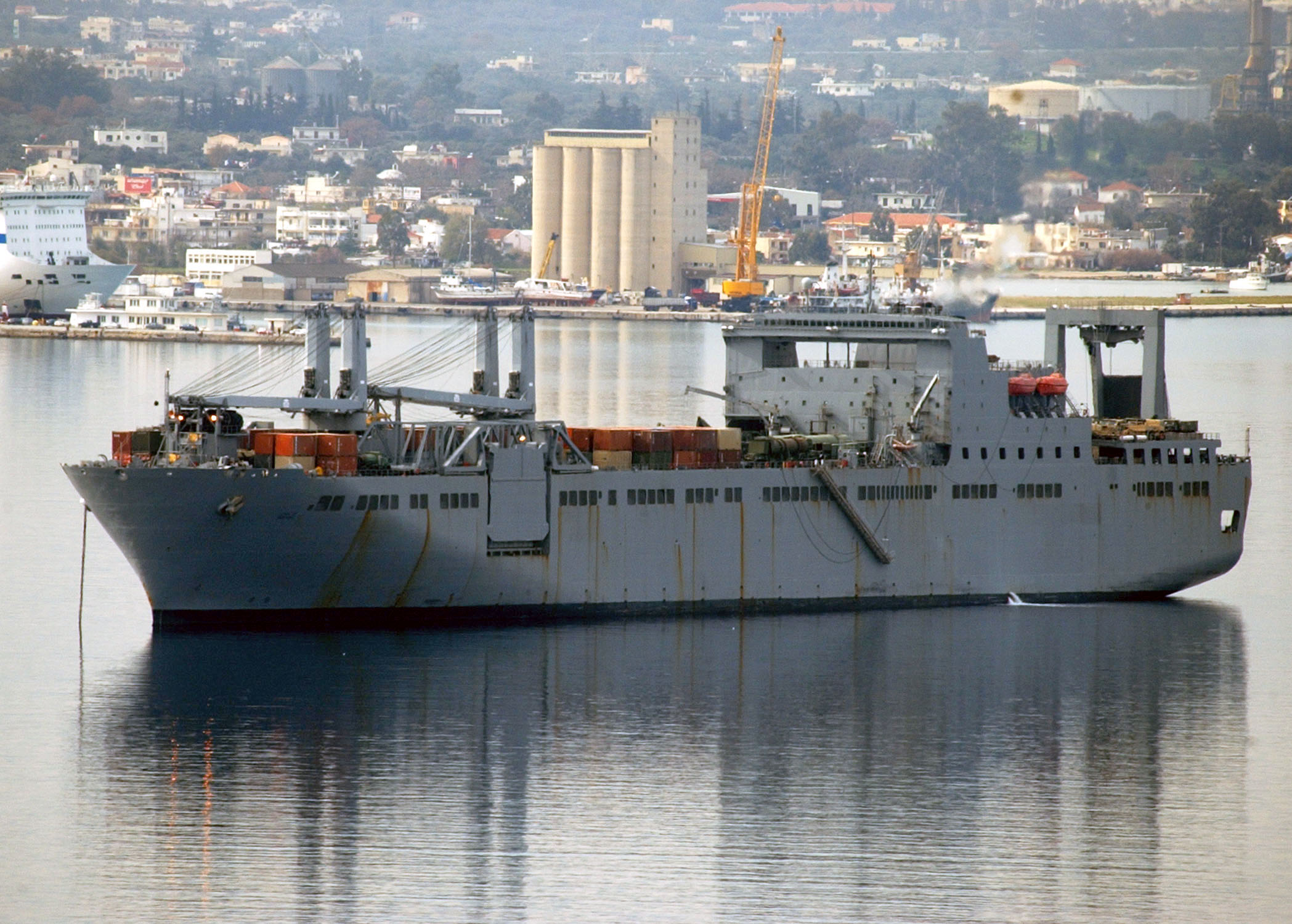
USNS Bob Hope (T-AKR 300)

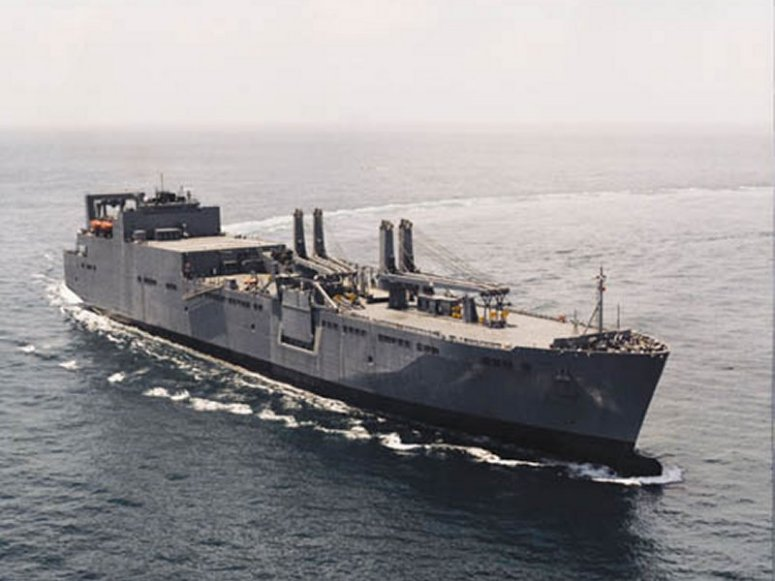
USNS Watson (T-AKR-310)

- USNS Comet (T-AKR-7), ex-LSV-7
- USNS Meteor (T-AKR-9), ex-LSV-9

Cape-I-class: MA Type C7-S-95

- SS Cape Island (T-AKR-10) [R]
- SS Cape Intrepid (T-AKR-11) [R]
- SS Cape Isabel (T-AKR-5062) [R]
- SS Cape Inscription (T-AKR-5076) [R]

Cape-T-class

- MV Cape Texas (T-AKR-112) [R]
- MV Cape Taylor (T-AKR-113) [R]

Algol-class

- USNS Algol (T-AKR-287), ex-T-AK-287 [R]
- USNS Bellatrix (T-AKR-288), ex-T-AK-288 [R]
- USNS Denebola (T-AKR-289), ex-T-AK-289 [R]
- USNS Pollux (T-AKR-290), ex-T-AK-290 [R]
- USNS Altair (T-AKR-291), ex-T-AK-291 [R]
- USNS Regulus (T-AKR-292), ex-T-AK-292 [R]
- USNS Capella (T-AKR-293), ex-T-AK-293 [R]
- USNS Antares (T-AKR-294), ex-T-AK-294 [R]

Shughart-Class

- USNS Shughart (T-AKR-295) [I]
- USNS Yano (T-AKR-297) [I]
- USNS Soderman (T-AKR-299), later T-AK-3017 as GySgt Fred W. Stockham

Gordon-Class

- USNS Gordon (T-AKR-296) [R]
- USNS Gilliland (T-AKR-298) [R]

Bob Hope-class

- USNS Bob Hope (T-AKR-300) [R]
- USNS Fisher (T-AKR-301) [R]
- USNS Seay (T-AKR-302) [A]
- USNS Mendonca (T-AKR-303) [R]
- USNS Pililaau (T-AKR-304) [A]
- USNS Brittin (T-AKR-305) [R]
- USNS Benavidez (T-AKR-306) [R]

Watson-class

- USNS Watson (T-AKR-310) [A]
- USNS Sisler (T-AKR-311) [A]
- USNS Dahl (T-AKR-312) [A]
- USNS Red Cloud (T-AKR-313) [R]
- USNS Charlton (T-AKR-314) [R]
- USNS Watkins (T-AKR-315) [R]
- USNS Pomeroy (T-AKR-316) [R]
- USNS Soderman (T-AKR-317) [R]

Other classes

- GTS Adm Wm M. Callaghan (T-AKR-1001) [R]
- SS Cape Nome (T-AKR-1014) [I]
- SS Cape Arundel (T-AKR-1214) [R]
- SS Cape Cortes (T-AKR-1215) [R]
- MV Cape Orlando (T-AKR-2044) [R]
- MV Cape San Juan (T-AKR-4467) [R]
- MV Cape Sable (T-AKR-4468) [R]
- MV Cape Ducato (T-AKR-5051) [R]
- MV Cape Douglas (T-AKR-5052) [R]
- MV Cape Domingo (T-AKR-5053) [R]
- MV Cape Decision (T-AKR-5054) [R]
- MV Cape Diamond (T-AKR-5055) [R]
- MV Cape May (T-AKR-5063) [I]
- SS Cape Mendocino (T-AKR-5064) [I]
- SS Cape Mohican (T-AKR-5065) [I]
- MV Cape Hudson (T-AKR-5066) [R]
- MV Cape Henry (T-AKR-5067) [R]
- MV Cape Horn (T-AKR-5068) [R]
- MV Cape Edmont (T-AKR-5069) [R]
- SS Cape Flattery (T-AKR-5070) [R]
- MV Cape Lambert (T-AKR-5077)
- MV Cape Lobos (T-AKR-5078)
- MV Cape Knox (T-AKR-5082) [R]
- MV Cape Kennedy (T-AKR-5083) [R]
- MV Cape Vincent (T-AKR-9666) [R]
- MV Cape Rise (T-AKR-9678) [R]
- MV Cape Ray (T-AKR-9679) [R], used to destroy Syrian chemical weapons in 2014
- MV Cape Victory (T-AKR-9701) [R]
- MV Cape Trinity (T-AKR-9711) [R]
- MV Cape Race (T-AKR-9960) [R]
- MV Cape Washington (T-AKR-9961) [R]
- MV Cape Wrath (T-AKR-9962) [R]

== General stores issue ships (AKS) ==
- USS Antares (AKS-3), ex-AG-10

Castor and Unknown classes: all MC type C2

- USS Castor (AKS-1)
- USS Pollux (AKS-2), wrecked Newfoundland 18 February 1942, 93 killed
- USS Pollux (AKS-4), Operation Crossroads nuclear test participant
- USS Mercury (AKS-20)

Acubens-class: MC type EC2-S-C1

- USS Acubens (AKS-5)
- USS Kochab (AKS-6)
- USS Luna (AKS-7)
- USS Talita (AKS-8)
- USS Volans (AKS-9)
- USS Cybele (AKS-10)
- USS Gratia (AKS-11)
- USS Hecuba (AKS-12)
- USS Hesperia (AKS-13), Operation Crossroads participant
- USS Iolanda (AKS-14)
- USS Liguria (AKS-15)

LST-542 class

- USS Blackford (AKS-16), ex-LST-1111, later APB-45
- USS Dorchester (AKS-17), ex-LST-1112, later APB-46
- USS Kingman (AKS-18), ex-LST-1113, later APB-47
- USS Presque Isle (AKS-19), ex-LST-678, later APB-44

Belle Isle-class: MC type EC2-S-C1

- USS Belle Isle (AKS-21), ex-AG-73
- USS Coasters Harbor (AKS-22), ex-AG-74
- USS Cuttyhunk Island (AKS-23), ex-AG-75
- USS Avery Island (AKS-24), ex-AG-76
- USS Indian Island (AKS-25), ex-AG-77
- USS Kent Island (AKS-26), ex-AG-78

LST-542 class

- USS Electron (AKS-27), ex-LST-1070, AG-146
- USS Proton (AKS-28), ex-LST-1078, AG-147
- USS Colington (AKS-29), ex-LST-1085, AG-148
- USS League Island (AKS-30), ex-LST-1097, AG-149
- USS Chimon (AKS-31), ex-LST-1102, AG-150

Antares-class: MA type VC2-S-AP3

- USS Altair (AKS-32)
- USS Antares (AKS-33)

== Technical stores issue ships (AKST) ==
Appeared in a Ship Characteristics Board project list under projects SCB 81 and SCB 108, not assigned to any ship.

== Aircraft transports (AKV, T-AKV) ==
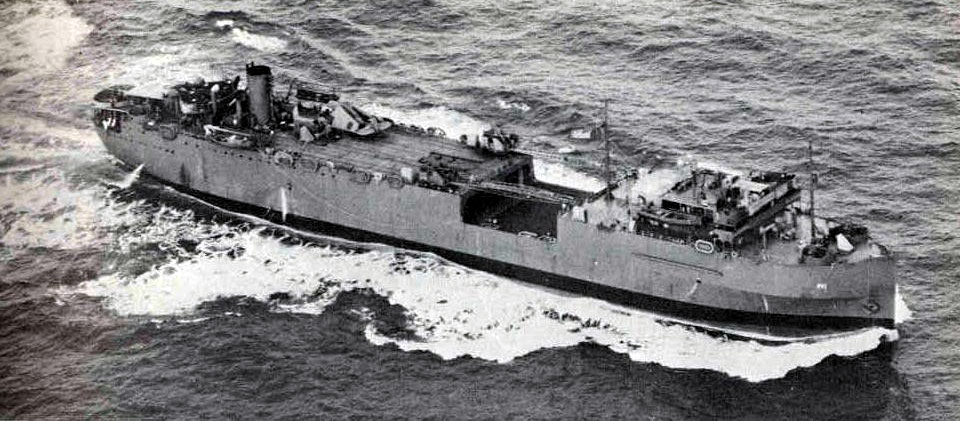
USS Kitty Hawk (AKV-1) as (APV-1)

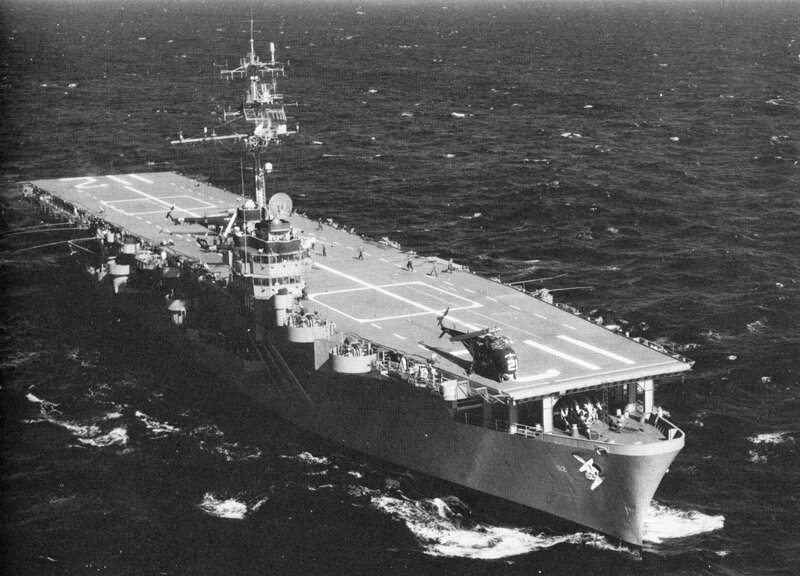
USS Siboney (AKV-12) as (CVE-112)

- USS Kitty Hawk (AKV-1), ex-APV-1
- USS Hammondsport (AKV-2), ex-APV-2

LT. James E. Robinson class: MA type VC2-S-AP1

- USNS LT. James E. Robinson (T-AKV-3), later T-AK-274, T-AG-170
- USNS Pvt. Joseph F. Merrell (T-AKV-4), later T-AK-275
- USNS Sgt. Jack J. Pendleton (T-AKV-5), later T-AK-276

Other classes

- USNS Albert M. Boe (T-AKV-6)
- USNS Cardinal O'Connell (T-AKV-7)

Commencement Bay class: MA type T3

- USS Kula Gulf (AKV-8), ex-CVE-108
- USS Cape Gloucester (AKV-9), ex-CVE-109
- USS Salerno Bay (AKV-10), ex-CVE-110
- USS Vella Gulf (AKV-11), ex-CVE-111
- USS Siboney (AKV-12), ex-CVE-112
- USS Puget Sound (AKV-13), ex-CVE-113
- USS Rendova (AKV-14), ex-CVE-114
- USS Bairoko (AKV-15), ex-CVE-115
- USS Badoeng Strait (AKV-16), ex-CVE-116
- USS Saidor (AKV-17), ex-CVE-117
- USS Sicily (AKV-18), ex-CVE-118
- USS Point Cruz (AKV-19), ex-CVE-119
- USS Mindoro (AKV-20), ex-CVE-120
- USS Rabaul (AKV-21), ex-CVE-121, CVHE-121
- USS Palau (AKV-22), ex-CVE-122
- USS Tinian (AKV-23), ex-CVE-123, CVHE-123

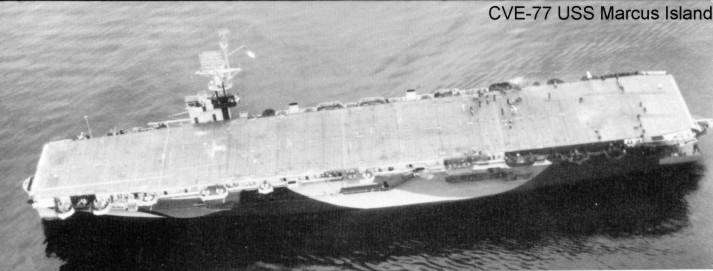
USS Marcus Island (AKV-27) as (CVE-77)

Casablanca class: MA type S4-S2-BB3

- USS Nehenta Bay (AKV-24), ex-CVE-74
- USS Hoggatt Bay (AKV-25), ex-CVE-75
- USS Kadashan Bay (AKV-26), ex-CVE-76
- USS Marcus Island (AKV-27), ex-CVE-77
- USS Savo Island (AKV-28), ex-CVE-78
- USS Rudyerd Bay (AKV-29), ex-CVE-81
- USS Sitkoh Bay (AKV-30), ex-CVE-86
- USS Takanis Bay (AKV-31), ex-CVE-89
- USS Lunga Point (AKV-32), ex-CVE-94
- USS Hollandia (AKV-33), ex-CVE-97
- USS Kwajalein (AKV-34), ex-CVE-98
- USS Bougainville (AKV-35), ex-CVE-100
- USS Matanikau (AKV-36), ex-CVE-101

Commencement Bay class

- USS Commencement Bay (AKV-37), ex-CVE-105, CVHE-105
- USS Block Island (AKV-38), ex-CVE-106, LPH-1
- USS Gilbert Islands (AKV-39), ex-CVE-107, later AGMR-1

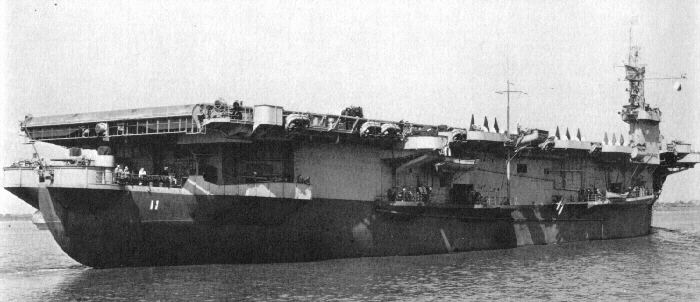
USNS Card (T-AKV-40) as (CVE-11)

Bogue class: MA types C3-S-A1 and C3-S-A2

- USS Card (T-AKV-40), ex-AVG-11, ACV-11, CVE-11, CVHE-11, CVU-11, T-CVU-11, sunk 2 May 1964 Saigon, Vietnam, 5 killed, repaired
- USNS Core (T-AKV-41), ex-AVG-13, ACV-13, CVE-13, CVHE-13, CVU-13
- USNS Breton (T-AKV-42), ex-AVG-23, ACV-23, CVE-23
- USNS Croatan (T-AKV-43), ex-AVG-25, ACV-25, CVE-25

== Net laying ships (AN) ==
USS Montauk (AN-2)

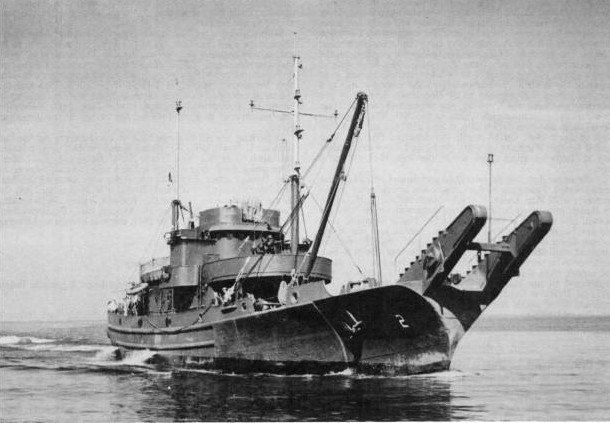
USS Ash (AN-7)

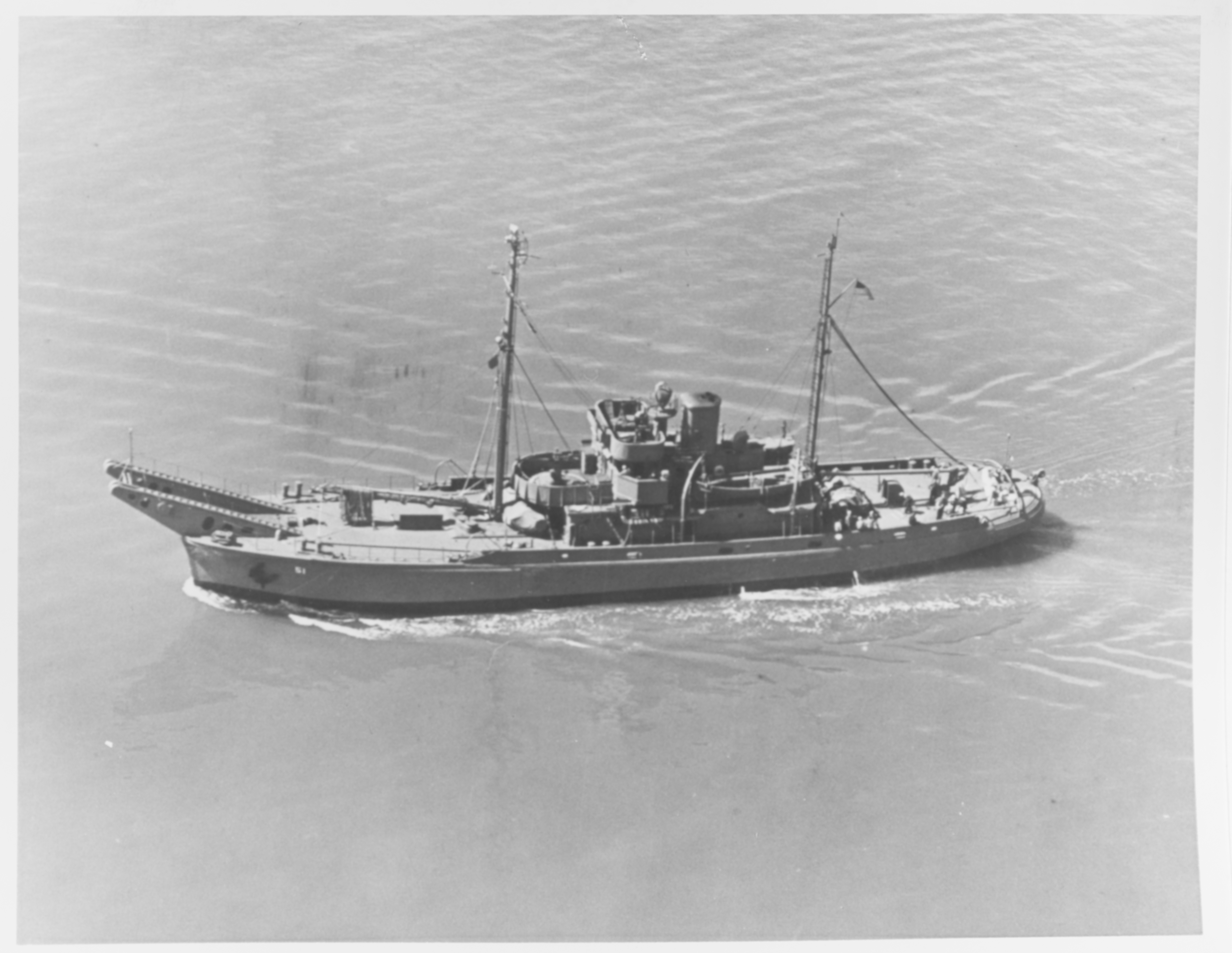
USS Silverbell (AN-51)

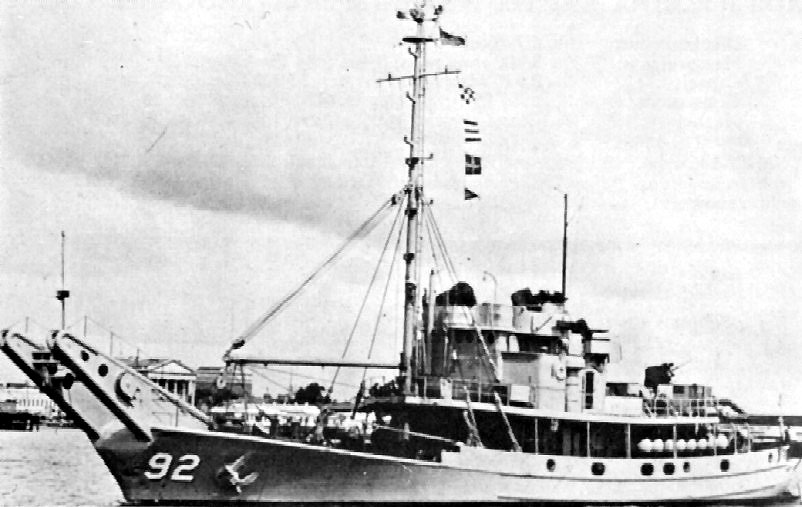
USS Yazoo (AN-92)

- USS Monitor (AN-1), later AP-160, LSV-5, MCS-5
- USS Montauk (AN-2), later AP-161, LSV-6, AKN-6
- USS Osage (AN-3), later AP-108, LSV-3, MCS-3
- USS Saugus (AN-4), later AP-109, LSV-4, MCS-4
- USS Keokuk (AN-5), later CM-8, CMc-6, AKN-4

All of the following ships were originally classed as Yard Net Tenders, see List of yard and district craft of the United States Navy § Yard Net Tenders (YN) for the original hull numbers.

Aloe-class

- USS Aloe (AN-6)
- USS Ash (AN-7)
- USS Boxwood (AN-8)
- USS Butternut (AN-9), Operation Wigwam nuclear test participant, later ANL-9, YAG-60
- USS Catalpa (AN-10)
- USS Chestnut (AN-11)
- USS Cinchona (AN-12)
- USS Buckeye (AN-13)
- USS Buckthorn (AN-14)
- USS Ebony (AN-15)
- USS Eucalyptus (AN-16)
- USS Chinquapin (AN-17)
- USS Gum Tree (AN-18)
- USS Holly (AN-19)
- USS Elder (AN-20), Operation Ivy nuclear test participant
- USS Larch (AN-21)
- USS Locust (AN-22)
- USS Mahogany (AN-23)
- USS Mango (AN-24)
- USS Hackberry (AN-25)
- USS Mimosa (AN-26)
- USS Mulberry (AN-27)
- USS Palm (AN-28)
- USS Hazel (AN-29)
- USS Redwood (AN-30)
- USS Rosewood (AN-31)
- USS Sandalwood (AN-32)
- USS Nutmeg (AN-33)
- USS Teaberry (AN-34)
- USS Teak (AN-35)
- USS Pepperwood (AN-36)
- USS Yew (AN-37)

Ailanthus-class

- USS Ailanthus (AN-38), wrecked Aleutians 26 February 1944
- USS Bitterbush (AN-39)
- USS Anaqua (AN-40)
- USS Baretta (AN-41)
- USS Cliffrose (AN-42)
- USS Satinleaf (AN-43)
- USS Corkwood (AN-44)
- USS Cornel (AN-45)
- USS Mastic (AN-46)
- USS Canotia (AN-47)
- USS Lancewood (AN-48)
- USS Papaya (AN-49)
- USS Cinnamon (AN-50)
- USS Silverbell (AN-51)
- USS Snowbell (AN-52), wrecked by Typhoon Louise Okinawa October 1945
- USS Spicewood (AN-53)
- USS Manchineel (AN-54)
- USS Torchwood (AN-55)
- USS Winterberry (AN-56)
- USS Viburnum (AN-57)
- USS Abele (AN-58)
- USS Terebinth (AN-59)
- USS Catclaw (AN-60)
- USS Chinaberry (AN-61)
- USS Hoptree (AN-62)
- USS Whitewood (AN-63), later AG-129
- USS Palo Blanco (AN-64)
- USS Palo Verde (AN-65)
- USS Pinon (AN-66)
- USS Shellbark (AN-67)
- USS Silverleaf (AN-68)
- USS Stagbush (AN-69)
- USS Allthorn (AN-70)
- USS Tesota (AN-71)
- USS Yaupon (AN-72)
- USS Precept (AN-73)
- USS Boxelder (AN-74)
- USS Prefect (AN-75)
- USS Satinwood (AN-76)
- USS Seagrape (AN-77)

Cohoes-class

- USS Cohoes (AN-78)
- USS Etlah (AN-79), Operation Crossroads nuclear test participant
- USS Suncook (AN-80), Operation Crossroads participant
- USS Manayunk (AN-81)
- USS Marietta (AN-82)
- USS Nahant (AN-83)
- USS Naubuc (AN-84)
- USS Oneota (AN-85), Operation Crossroads participant
- USS Passaconaway (AN-86)
- USS Passaic (AN-87)
- USS Shakamaxon (AN-88), Operation Crossroads participant
- USS Tonawanda (AN-89)
- USS Tunxis (AN-90)
- USS Waxsaw (AN-91)
- USS Yazoo (AN-92)

=== Net layer (ANL) ===
- USS Butternut (ANL-9), ex-YN-4, ex-AN-9, later YAG-60

== Gasoline tankers (AOG, T-AOG) ==
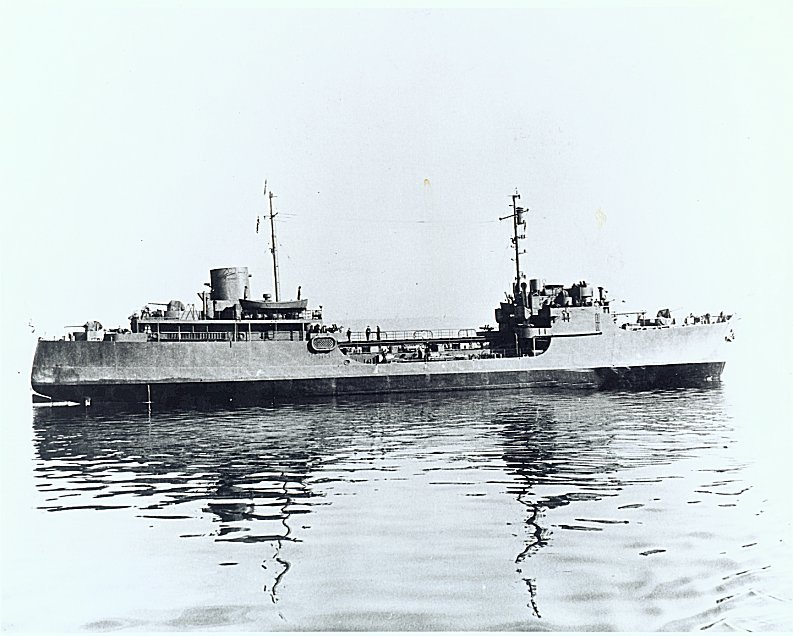
USS Patapsco (AOG-1)

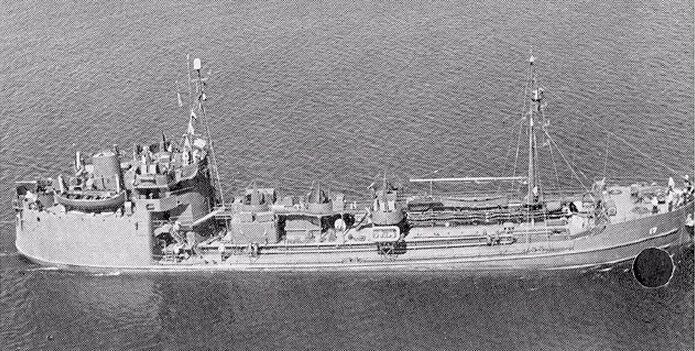
USS Mettawee (AOG-17)

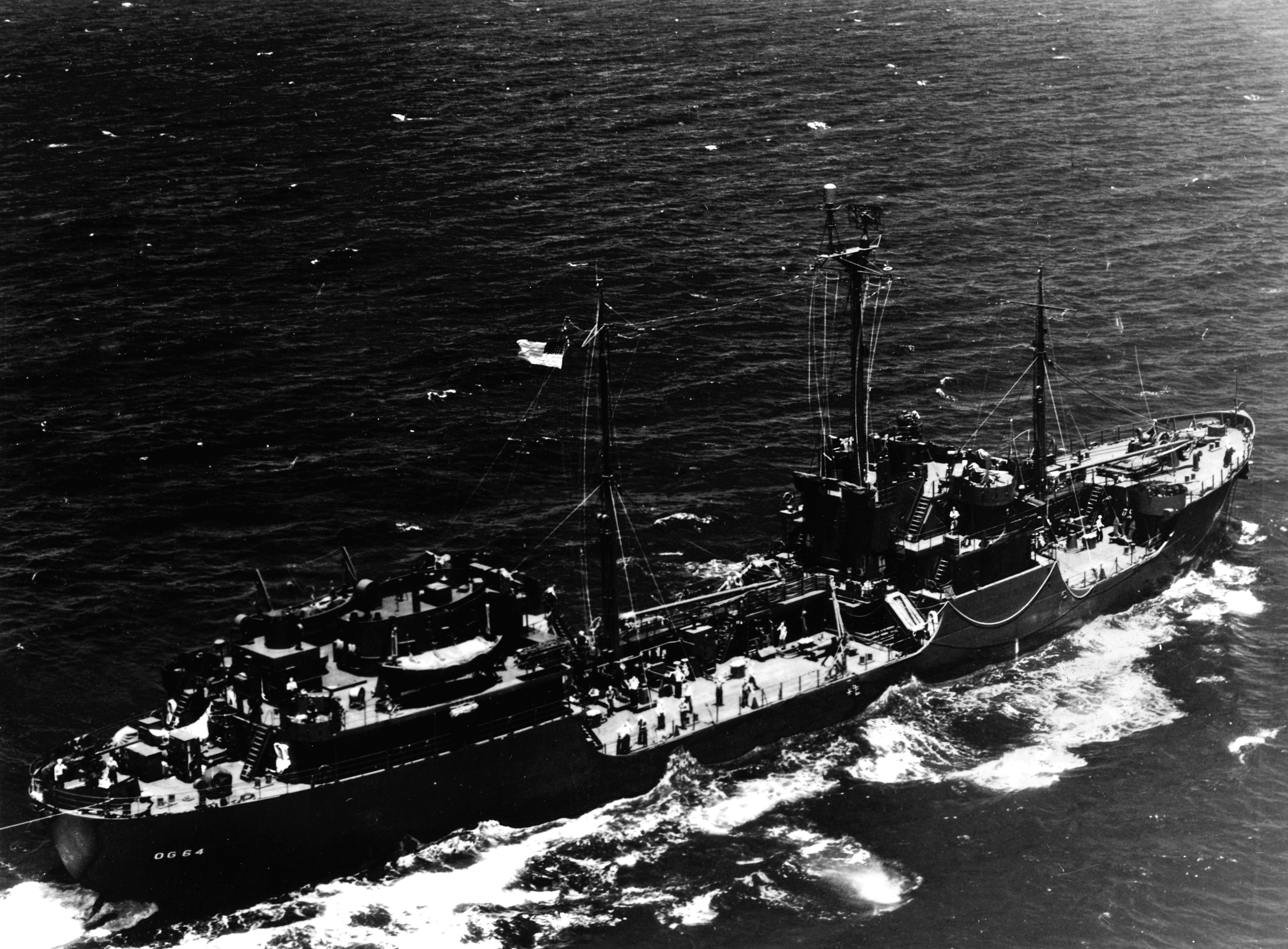
USS Klickitat (AOG-64)

All AOG tankers were MarCom (MC) T1 tankers, with the exception of these former commercial ships: the Halawa-class, AOG-13, AOG-14, AOG-16 and AOG-47.

Patapsco-class: MC type T1-MT-M1

- USS Patapsco (AOG-1), inadvertent Operation Castle nuclear test participant
- USS Kern (AOG-2)
- USS Rio Grande (AOG-3)
- USS Wabash (AOG-4)
- USS Susquehanna (AOG-5)
- USS Agawam (AOG-6), Operation Ivy nuclear test participant
- USS Elkhorn (AOG-7)
- USS Genesee (AOG-8)
- USS Kishwaukee (AOG-9)
- USS Nemasket (AOG-10)
- USS Tombigbee (AOG-11), Operation Crossroads nuclear test participant
- USS Chehalis (AOG-48), exploded and sank, Tutuila, American Samoa, 7 October 1949, 6 killed
- USS Chestatee (AOG-49)
- USS Chewaucan (AOG-50)
- USS Maquoketa (AOG-51)
- USS Mattabesset (AOG-52)
- USS Namakogon (AOG-53)
- USS Natchaug (AOG-54)
- USS Nespelen (AOG-55)
- USS Noxubee (AOG-56)
- USS Pecatonica (AOG-57)
- USS Pinnebog (AOG-58)
- USS Wacissa (AOG-59)

Halawa-class

- USS Halawa (AOG-12)
- USS Conasauga (AOG-15)

Mettawee-class: MC type T1-M-A2

- USS Mettawee (AOG-17)
- USS Pasquotank (AOG-18)
- USS Sakatonchee (AOG-19)
- USS Seekonk (AOG-20)
- USS Sequatchie (AOG-21)
- USS Wautauga (AOG-22)
- USS Ammonusuc (AOG-23)
- USS Sheepscot (AOG-24), wrecked off Iwo Jima 6 June 1945
- USS Calamus (AOG-25)
- USS Chiwaukum (AOG-26)
- USS Escatawpa (AOG-27)
- USS Gualala (AOG-28)
- USS Hiwassee (AOG-29)
- USS Kalamazoo (AOG-30)
- USS Kanawha (AOG-31)
- USS Narraguagas (AOG-32)
- USS Ochlockonee (AOG-33)
- USS Oconee (AOG-34)
- USS Ogeechee (AOG-35)
- USS Ontonagon (AOG-36)
- USS Yahara (AOG-37)
- USS Ponchatoula (AOG-38)
- USS Quastinet (AOG-39)
- USS Sacandaga (AOG-40)
- USS Tetonkaha (AOG-41)
- USS Towaliga (AOG-42)
- USS Tularosa (AOG-43)
- USS Wakulla (AOG-44)
- USS Yacona (AOG-45)
- USS Waupaca (AOG-46)
- USS Manokin (AOG-60)
- USS Sakonnet (AOG-61)
- USS Conemaugh (AOG-62)
- USS Klaskanine (AOG-63)

Klickitat-class: MC type T1-M-BT1

- USS Klickitat (AOG-64)
- USS Michigamme (AOG-65)
- USS Nanticoke (AOG-66)
- USS Peconic (AOG-68)
- USS Petaluma (AOG-69), not commissioned
- USS Piscataqua (AOG-70), not commissioned

Other / unknown classes

- USS Kaloli (AOG-13)
- USS Aroostook (AOG-14)
- USS Guyandot (AOG-16)
- USS Shikellamy (AOG-47), ex-AO-90
- USS Nordaway (AOG-67)
- USS Quinnebaug (AOG-71)
- USS Sebasticook (AOG-72)
- USS Kiamichi (AOG-73)
- USS Tellico (AOG-74)
- USS Truckee (AOG-75)
- USNS Tonti (T-AOG-76)
- USNS Rincon (T-AOG-77)
- USNS Nodaway (T-AOG-78)
- USNS Petaluma (T-AOG-79)
- USNS Piscataqua (T-AOG-80)
- USNS Alatna (T-AOG-81), Operation Dominic nuclear test participant
- USNS Chattahoochee (T-AOG-82)

== Transports (AP, T-AP) ==
- USS Henderson (AP-1), later AH-9
- USS Doyen (AP-2), later APA-1
- USS Hancock (AP-3), later IX-12
- USS Argonne (AP-4), later AS-10
- USS Chaumont (AP-5), later AH-10
- USS William Ward Burrows (AP-6)
- USS Wharton (AP-7), Operation Crossroads nuclear test participant
- USS Harris (AP-8), later APA-2
- USS Zeilin (AP-9), later APA-3
- USS McCawley (AP-10), later APA-4
- USS Barnett (AP-11), later APA-5
- USS Heywood (AP-12), later APA-6
- USS George F. Elliott (AP-13), ex-ID-3514, sunk by aircraft near Guadalcanal 8 August 1942
- USS Fuller (AP-14), later APA-7
- USS William P. Biddle (AP-15), later APA-8
- USS Neville (AP-16), ex-SP-2676, later APA-9
- USS Harry Lee (AP-17), later APA-10
- USS Catlin (AP-19), ex-ID-3018
- USS Munargo (AP-20)
- USS Wakefield (AP-21)
- USS Mount Vernon (AP-22)
- USS West Point (AP-23)
- USS Orizaba (AP-24), ex-ID-1536
- USS Leonard Wood (AP-25), later APA-12
- USS Joseph T. Dickman (AP-26), later APA-13
- USS Hunter Liggett (AP-27), later APA-14
- USS Kent (AP-28), ex-ID-3804
- USS U. S. Grant (AP-29), ex-ID-3011
- USS Henry T. Allen (AP-30), later APA-15, AG-90
- USS Chateau Thierry (AP-31)
- USS St Mihiel (AP-32)
- USS Republic (AP-33), ex-ID-3014
- USS J. Franklin Bell (AP-34), later APA-16
- USS American Legion (AP-35), later APA-17
- Santa Ana (AP-36), ex-ID-2869, not commissioned
- USS President Jackson (AP-37), later APA-18
- USS President Adams (AP-38), later APA-19
- USS President Hayes (AP-39), later APA-20
- USS Crescent City (AP-40), later APA-21
- USS Stratford (AP-41)
- USS Tasker H. Bliss (AP-42), sunk by torpedo Morocco 12 November 1942, 31 killed
- USS Hugh L. Scott (AP-43), sunk by torpedo Morocco 12 November 1942, 59 killed
- Willard A. Holbrook (AP-44), not commissioned
- Thomas H. Barry (AP-45), not commissioned
- James Parker (AP-46), not commissioned
- J.W. McAndrew (AP-47), not commissioned
- Frederick Funston (AP-48), later APA-89
- James O'Hara (AP-49), later APA-90
- USS Joseph Hewes (AP-50), later APA-22
- USS John Penn (AP-51), later APA-23
- USS Edward Rutledge (AP-52), later APA-24
- USS Lafayette (AP-53), ex-Normandie, burned and sank 9 February 1942, later APV-4 as hulk
- USS Hermitage (AP-54)
- USS Arthur Middleton (AP-55), later APA-25
- USS Samuel Chase (AP-56), later APA-26
- USS George Clymer (AP-57), later APA-27
- USS Charles Carroll (AP-58), later APA-28
- USS Thomas Stone (AP-59), later APA-29
- USS Thomas Jefferson (AP-60), later APA-30
- USS Monticello (AP-61)
- USS Kenmore (AP-62), later AH-11
- USS Rochambeau (AP-63)
- USS Monrovia (AP-64), later APA-31
- USS Calvert (AP-65), later APA-32
- USS Ancon (AP-66), later AGC-4
- USS Dorothea L. Dix (AP-67)
- Alameda (AP-68) (name assigned, never used)
- USS Elizabeth C. Stanton (AP-69)
- USS Florence Nightingale (AP-70)
- USS Lyon (AP-71)
- USS Susan B. Anthony (AP-72)
- USS Leedstown (AP-73), sunk by torpedoes Algiers 9 November 1942, 8 killed
- USS Lejeune (AP-74)
- USS Gemini (AP-75), ex-AG-38, ex-AK-52
- USS Anne Arundel (AP-76)
- USS Thurston (AP-77)
- USS Bayfield (AP-78), later APA-33
- USS Bolivar (AP-79), later APA-34
- USS Callaway (AP-80), later APA-35
- USS Cambria (AP-81), later APA-36
- USS Cavalier (AP-82), later APA-37
- USS Chilton (AP-83), later APA-38
- USS Clay (AP-84), later APA-39
- USS Custer (AP-85), later APA-40
- USS DuPage (AP-86), later APA-41
- USS Elmore (AP-87), later APA-42
- USS Fayette (AP-88), later APA-43
- USS Fremont (AP-89), later APA-44
- USS Henrico (AP-90), later APA-45
- USS Knox (AP-91), later APA-46
- USS Lamar (AP-92), later APA-47
- USS Leon (AP-93), later APA-48
- USS Ormsby (AP-94), later APA-49
- USS Pierce (AP-95), later APA-50
- USS Sheridan (AP-96), later APA-51
- USS Sumter (AP-97), later APA-52
- USS Warren (AP-98), later APA-53
- USS Wayne (AP-99), later APA-54
- USS Windsor (AP-100), later APA-55
- USS Wood (AP-101), later APA-56
- USS Hotspur (AP-102)
- USS President Polk (AP-103)
- USS President Monroe (AP-104)
- USS George F. Elliott (AP-105)
- USS Catskill (AP-106), ex-CM-6, later LSV-1
- USS Ozark (AP-107), ex-CM-7, later LSV-2
- USS Osage (AP-108), ex-AN-3, later LSV-3
- USS Saugus (AP-109), ex-AN-4, later LSV-4
- USS General John Pope (AP-110)
- USS General A. E. Anderson (AP-111)
- USS General W. A. Mann (AP-112)
- USS General H. W. Butner (AP-113)
- USS General William Mitchell (AP-114)
- USS General George M. Randall (AP-115)
- USS General M. C. Meigs (AP-116)
- USS General W. H. Gordon (AP-117)
- USS General W. P. Richardson (AP-118)
- USS General William Weigel (AP-119)
- USS Admiral W. S. Benson (AP-120)
  / USNS General Daniel I. Sultan (T-AP-120)
- USS Admiral W. L. Capps (AP-121)
  / USNS General Hugh J. Gaffey (T-AP-121), later IX-507
- USS Admiral R. E. Coontz (AP-122)
  / USNS General Alexander M. Patch (T-AP-122)
- USS Admiral E. W. Eberle (AP-123)
  / USNS General Simon B. Buckner (T-AP-123)
- USS Admiral C. F. Hughes (AP-124)
  / USNS General Edwin D. Patrick (T-AP-124)
- USS Admiral H. T. Mayo (AP-125)
  / USNS General Nelson M. Walker (T-AP-125)
- USS Admiral Hugh Rodman (AP-126)
  / USNS General Maurice Rose (T-AP-126)
- USS Admiral W. S. Sims (AP-127)
  / USNS General William O. Darby (T-AP-127), later IX-510
- USS Admiral D. W. Taylor (AP-128) (cancelled 12/16/44)
- USS Admiral F. B. Upham (AP-129) (cancelled 12/16/44)
- USS General G. O. Squier (AP-130)
- USS General T. H. Bliss (AP-131)
- USS General J. R. Brooke (AP-132)
- USS General Oswald H. Ernst (AP-133)
- USS General R. L. Howze (AP-134)
- USS General W. M. Black (AP-135)
- USS General H. L. Scott (AP-136)
- USS General S. D. Sturgis (AP-137)
- USS General C. G. Morton (AP-138)
- USS General R. E. Callan (AP-139), later T-AGM-9
- USS General M. B. Stewart (AP-140)
- USS General A. W. Greely (AP-141)
- USS General C. H. Muir (AP-142)
- USS General H. B. Freeman (AP-143)
- USS General H. F. Hodges (AP-144)
- USS General Harry Taylor (AP-145), later T-AGM-10
- USS General W. F. Hase (AP-146)
- USS General E. T. Collins (AP-147), Operation Ivy nuclear test participant
- USS General M. L. Hersey (AP-148)
- USS General J. H. McRae (AP-149)
- USS General M. M. Patrick (AP-150)
- USS General W. C. Langfitt (AP-151)
- USS General Omar Bundy (AP-152)
- USS General R. M. Blatchford (AP-153)
- USS General LeRoy Eltinge (AP-154)
- USS General A. W. Brewster (AP-155)
- USS General D. E. Aultman (AP-156)
- USS General C. C. Ballou (AP-157)
- USS General W. G. Haan (AP-158)
- USS General Stuart Heintzelman (AP-159)
- USS Monitor (AP-160), ex-AN-1, later LSV-5
- USS Montauk (AP-161), ex-AN-2, later LSV-6
- USS Kenmore (AP-162), later AK-221
- USS Livingston (AP-163), later AK-222
- USS De Grasse (AP-164), later AK-223
- USS Prince Georges (AP-165), later AK-224
- USS Comet (AP-166)
- USS John Land (AP-167)
- USS War Hawk (AP-168)
- USS Golden City (AP-169)
- USS Winged Arrow (AP-170)
- USS Storm King (AP-171)
- USS Cape Johnson (AP-172)
- USS Herald of the Morning (AP-173)
- USS Arlington (AP-174)
- USS Starlight (AP-175)
- USS General J. C. Breckinridge (AP-176)
- USS Europa (AP-177)
- USNS Frederick Funston (T-AP-178), ex-APA-89
- USNS James O'Hara (T-AP-179), ex-APA-90
- USNS David C. Shanks (T-AP-180), Operation Ivy participant
- USNS Fred C. Ainsworth (T-AP-181), Operation Castle participant
- USNS George W. Goethals (T-AP-182)
- USNS Henry Gibbins (T-AP-183)
- USNS Private Elden H. Johnson (T-AP-184), ex-APH-2
- USNS Private William H. Thomas (T-AP-185), ex-APH-3
- USNS Sgt. Charles E. Mower (T-AP-186), ex-APH-1
- USNS Private Joe P. Martinez (T-AP-187)
- USNS Aiken Victory (T-AP-188)
- USNS Lt. Raymond O. Beaudoin (T-AP-189)
- USNS Private Sadao S. Munemori (T-AP-190)
- USNS Sgt. Howard E. Woodford (T-AP-191)
- USNS Sgt. Sylvester Antolak (T-AP-192)
- USNS Marine Adder (T-AP-193), later T-AK-2005
- USNS Marine Lynx (T-AP-194)
- USNS Marine Phoenix (T-AP-195)
- USNS Barrett (T-AP-196)
- USNS Geiger (T-AP-197)
- USNS Upshur (T-AP-198)
- USNS Marine Carp (T-AP-199)
- USNS Marine Serpent (T-AP-202)
- SS Empire State (T-AP-1001)

== Self-propelled barracks ships (APB) ==
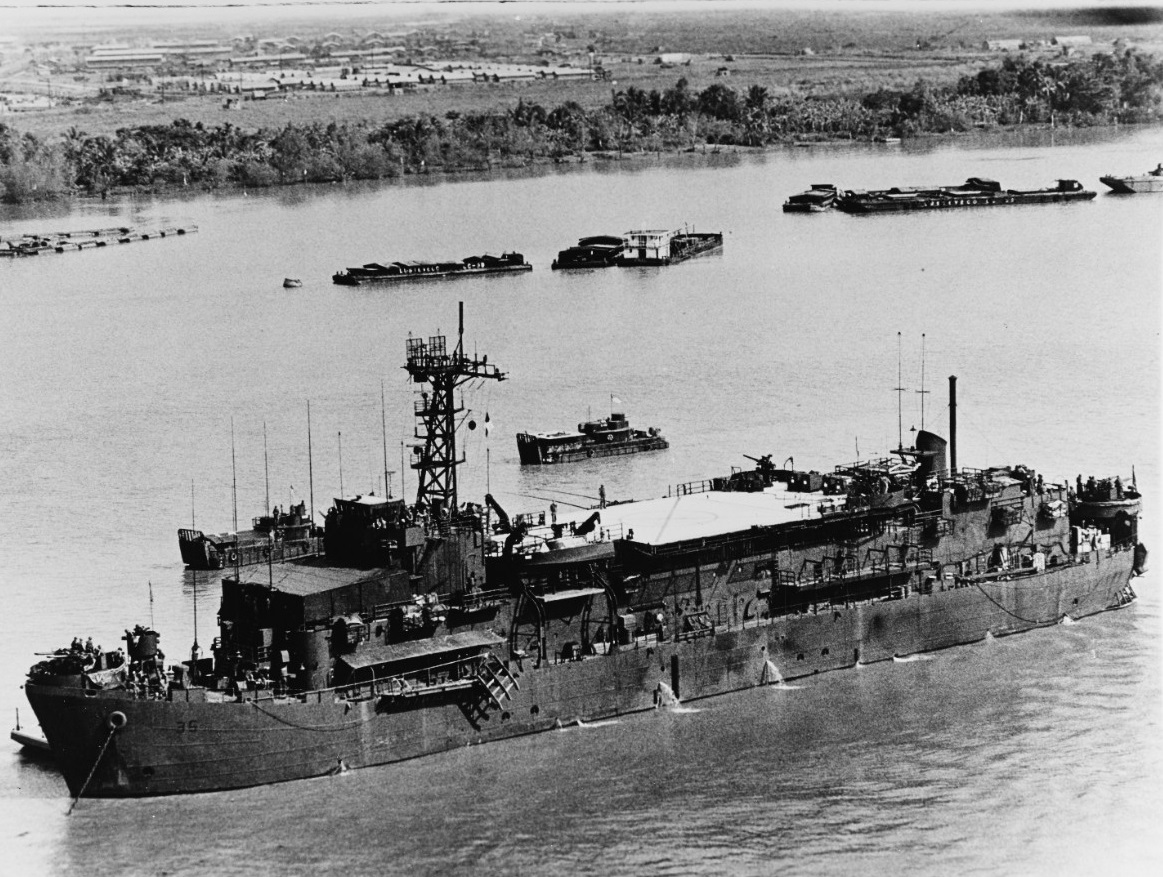
USS Benewah (APB-35)

Benewah-class

All ships of this class were based on LST hulls, but less than half were converted from actual LSTs.

- USS Benewah (APB-35)
- USS Colleton (APB-36)
- USS Echols (APB-37), later IX-504
- USS Marlboro (APB-38)
- USS Mercer (APB-39), later IX-502, APL-39
- USS Nueces (APB-40), later IX-503, APL-40
- USS Wythe (APB-41)
- USS Yavapai (APB-42)
- USS Yolo (APB-43), ex-LST-677
- USS Presque Isle (APB-44), ex-LST-678, Operation Crossroads nuclear test participant
- USS Blackford (APB-45), ex-LST-1111, ex-AKS-16
- USS Dorchester (APB-46), ex-LST-1112, ex-AKS-17
- USS Kingman (APB-47), ex-LST-1113, ex-AKS-18
- USS Vandenburgh (APB-48)
- USS Accomac (APB-49), ex-LST-710
- USS Cameron (APB-50), ex-LST-928

Other class

- USS DuPage (APB-51)

== Coastal transports (APC) ==
- USNS Sgt. Jonah E. Kelley (T-APC-116)
- USNS Sgt. George D. Keathley (T-APC-117), later T-AGS-35
- USNS Sgt. Joseph E. Muller (T-APC-118)
- USNS Pvt. Jose F. Valdez (T-APC-119)

== Small coastal transports (APc) ==
APc-1-class small coastal transports:

- USS APc-1
- USS APc-2
- USS APc-3
- USS APc-4
- USS APc-5
- USS APc-6
- USS APc-7
- USS APc-8
- USS APc-9
- USS APc-10
- USS APc-11
- USS APc-12
- USS APc-13
- USS APc-14
- USS APc-15
- USS APc-16
- USS APc-17
- USS APc-18
- USS APc-19
- USS APc-20
- USS APc-21, ex-AMc-172, sunk by Japanese aircraft off Arawe New Britain 17 December 1943
- USS APc-22
- USS APc-23
- USS APc-24
- USS APc-25
- USS APc-26
- USS APc-27
- USS APc-28
- USS APc-29
- USS APc-30
- USS APc-31
- USS APc-32
- USS APc-33
- USS APc-34
- USS APc-35
- USS APc-36
- USS APc-37
- USS APc-38
- USS APc-39
- USS APc-40
- USS APc-41
- USS APc-42
- USS APc-43
- USS APc-44
- USS APc-45
- USS APc-46
- USS APc-47
- USS APc-48
- USS APc-49
- USS APc-50
- USS APc-51
- USS APc-52
- USS APc-53
- USS APc-54
- USS APc-55
- USS APc-56
- USS APc-57
- USS APc-58
- USS APc-59
- USS APc-60
- USS APc-61
- USS APc-62
- USS APc-63
- USS APc-64
- USS APc-65
- USS APc-66
- USS APc-67
- USS APc-68
- USS APc-69
- USS APc-70
- USS APc-71
- USS APc-72
- USS APc-73
- USS APc-74
- USS APc-75
- USS APc-76
- USS APc-77
- USS APc-78
- USS APc-79
- USS APc-80 - USS APc-84, canceled
- USS APc-85
- USS APc-86
- USS APc-87
- USS APc-88
- USS APc-89
- USS APc-90
- USS APc-91
- USS APc-92
- USS APc-93
- USS APc-94
- USS APc-95
- USS APc-96
- USS APc-97
- USS APc-98
- USS APc-99, canceled
- USS APc-100, canceled
- USS APc-101
- USS APc-102
- USS APc-103
- USS APc-104 - USS APc-107, canceled
- USS APc-108
- USS APc-109
- USS APc-110
- USS APc-111
- USS APc-112 - USS APc-115, canceled

== Barracks craft (APL) ==
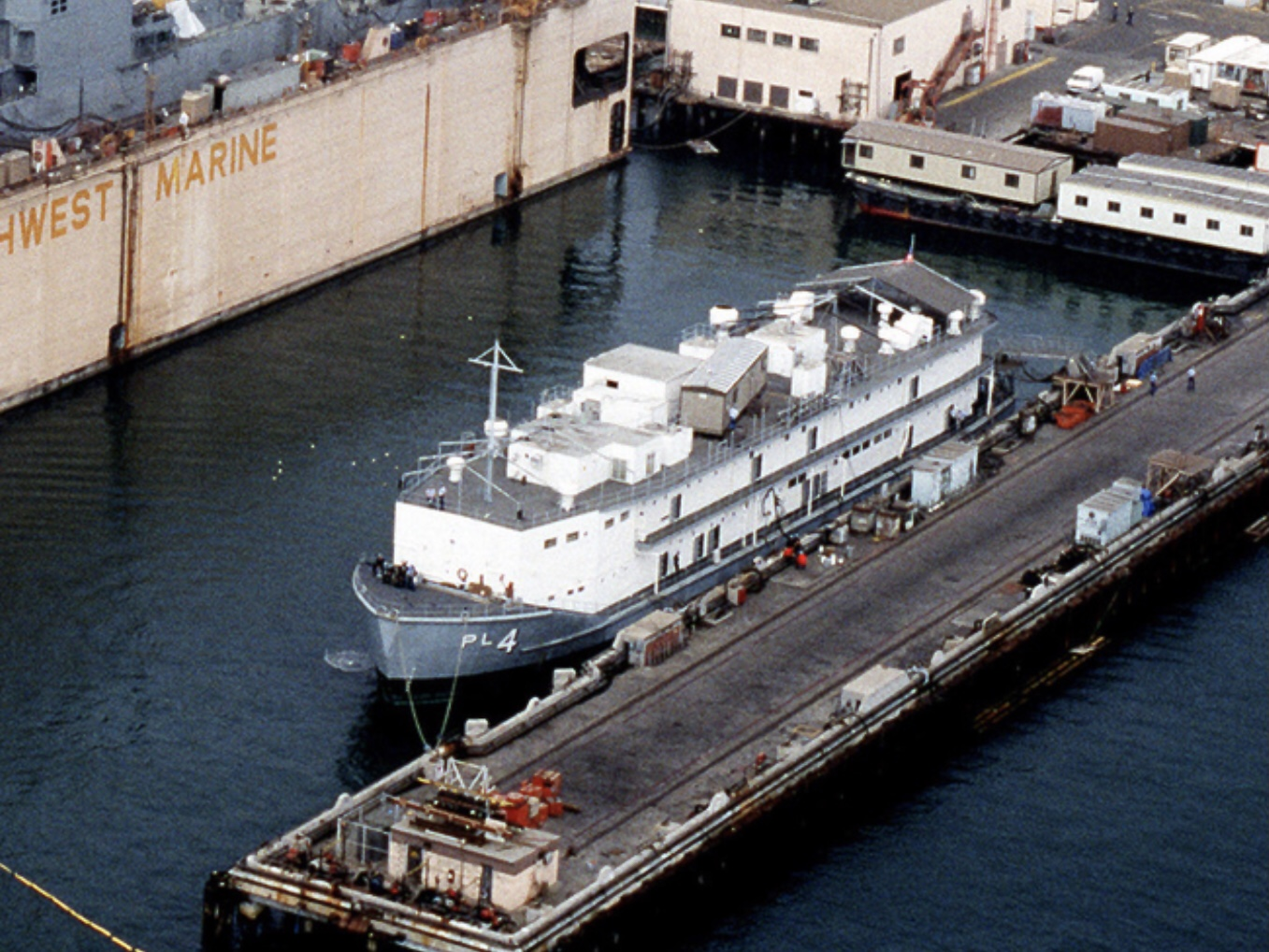
USS APL-4

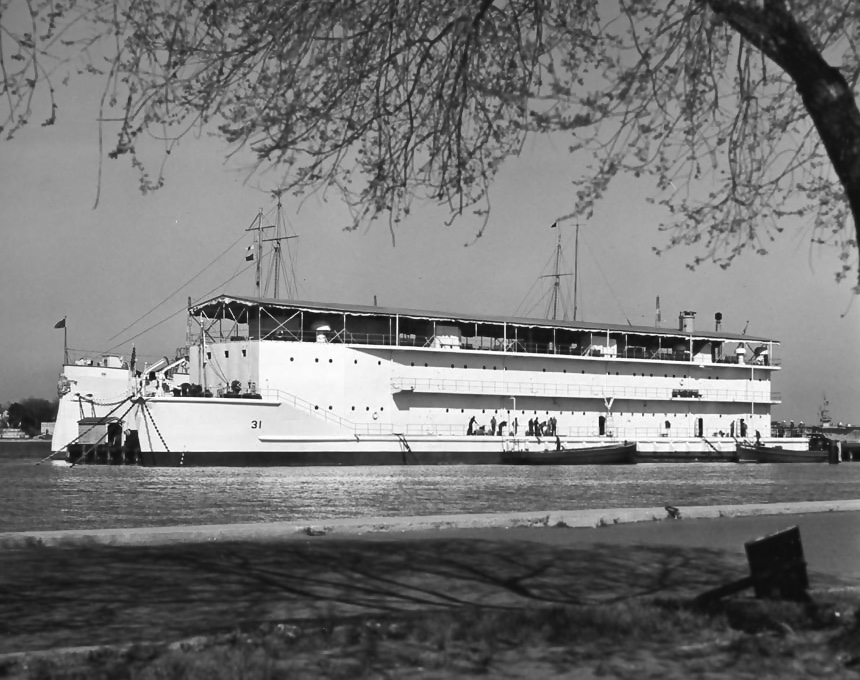
USS APL-31

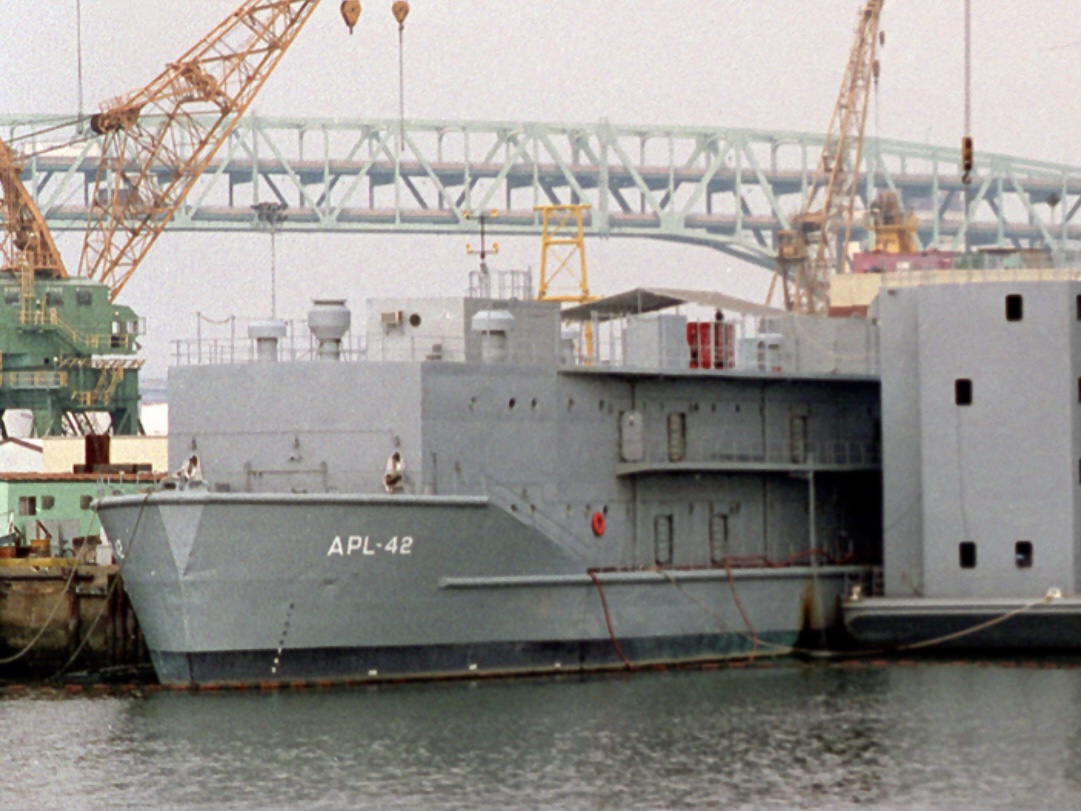
USS APL-42

- USS APL-1

APL-2-class

- USS APL-2 [A]
- USS APL-3
- USS APL-4 [A]
- USS APL-5 [A]
- USS APL-6
- USS APL-7
- USS APL-8
- USS APL-9
- USS APL-10
- USS APL-11
- USS APL-12, wrecked by Typhoon Louise Okinawa October 1945
- USS APL-13, wrecked by Typhoon Louise Okinawa October 1945
- USS APL-14
- USS APL-15 [A]
- USS APL-16, canceled

APL-17-class

- USS APL-17
- USS APL-18 [A]
- USS APL-19
- USS APL-20
- USS APL-21
- USS APL-22
- USS APL-23
- USS APL-24
- USS APL-25
- USS APL-26
- USS APL-27, Operation Crossroads nuclear test target
- USS APL-28
- USS APL-29 [A]
- USS APL-30
- USS APL-31
- USS APL-32 [A]
- USS APL-33, wrecked by Typhoon Louise Okinawa October 1945
- USS APL-34
- USS APL-35, converted to APB
- USS APL-36, converted to APB
- USS APL-37, converted to APB
- USS APL-38, converted to APB
- USS APL-39, converted to APB
- USS APL-40, converted to APB

APL-41-class

- USS APL-41
- USS APL-42 [A]
- USS APL-43
- USS APL-44
- USS APL-45 [A]
- USS APL-46
- USS APL-47
- USS APL-48
- USS APL-49
- USS APL-50 [A]
- USS APL-51, canceled
- USS APL-52, canceled

APL-53 class

- USS APL-53
- USS APL-54
- USS APL-55, later YRBM-18
- USS APL-56
- USS APL-57
- USS APL-58 [A]

Other classes

- USS APL-59, ex-LST-53
- USS APL-60, ex-Pursuivant

APL-61-class

- USS APL-61 [A]
- USS APL-62 [A]
- USS APL-63
- USS APL-64

APL-65 class

- USS APL-65 [A]
- USS APL-66 [A]

APL-67-class

- USS APL-67 [A]
- USS APL-68 [A]
- USS APL-69 [A]
- USS APL-70 [P]
- USS APL-71 [P]

== Mechanized artillery transports (APM) ==
APM was the original hull designation of what became the Landing Ship, Dock (LSD).

== Convoy rescue craft (APR) ==
APR was the original hull symbol intended for the patrol craft escorts that were converted to rescue crews from ships attacked in convoys, but they were instead redesignated as PCERs.

== Transport and aircraft ferries (APV) ==
- USS Kitty Hawk (APV-1), later AKV-1
- USS Hammondsport (APV-2), later AKV-2
- USS Lakehurst (APV-3)
- USS Lafayette (APV-4), ex-AP-53, hulk

== Repair ships (AR) ==
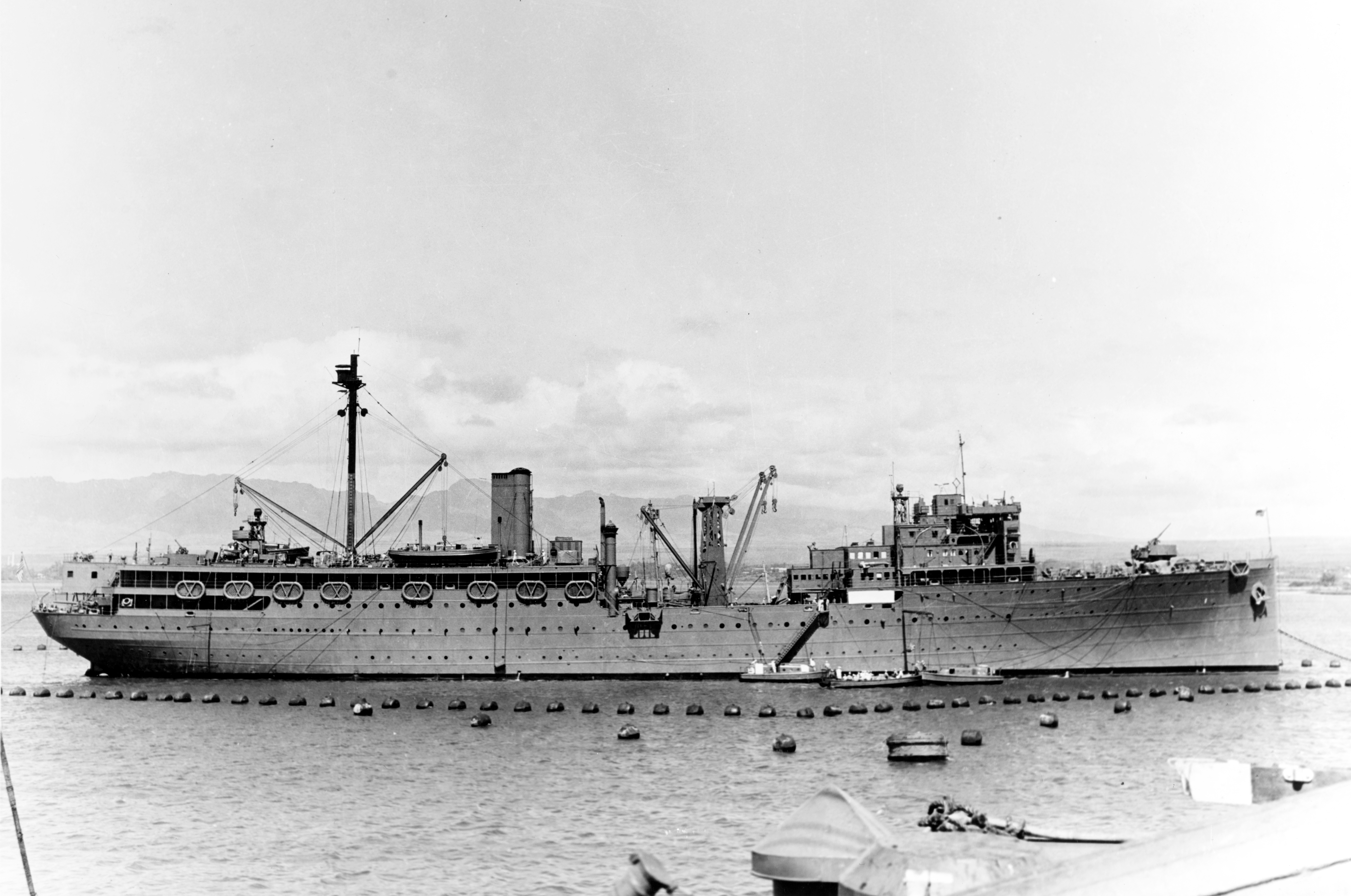
USS Medusa (AR-1)

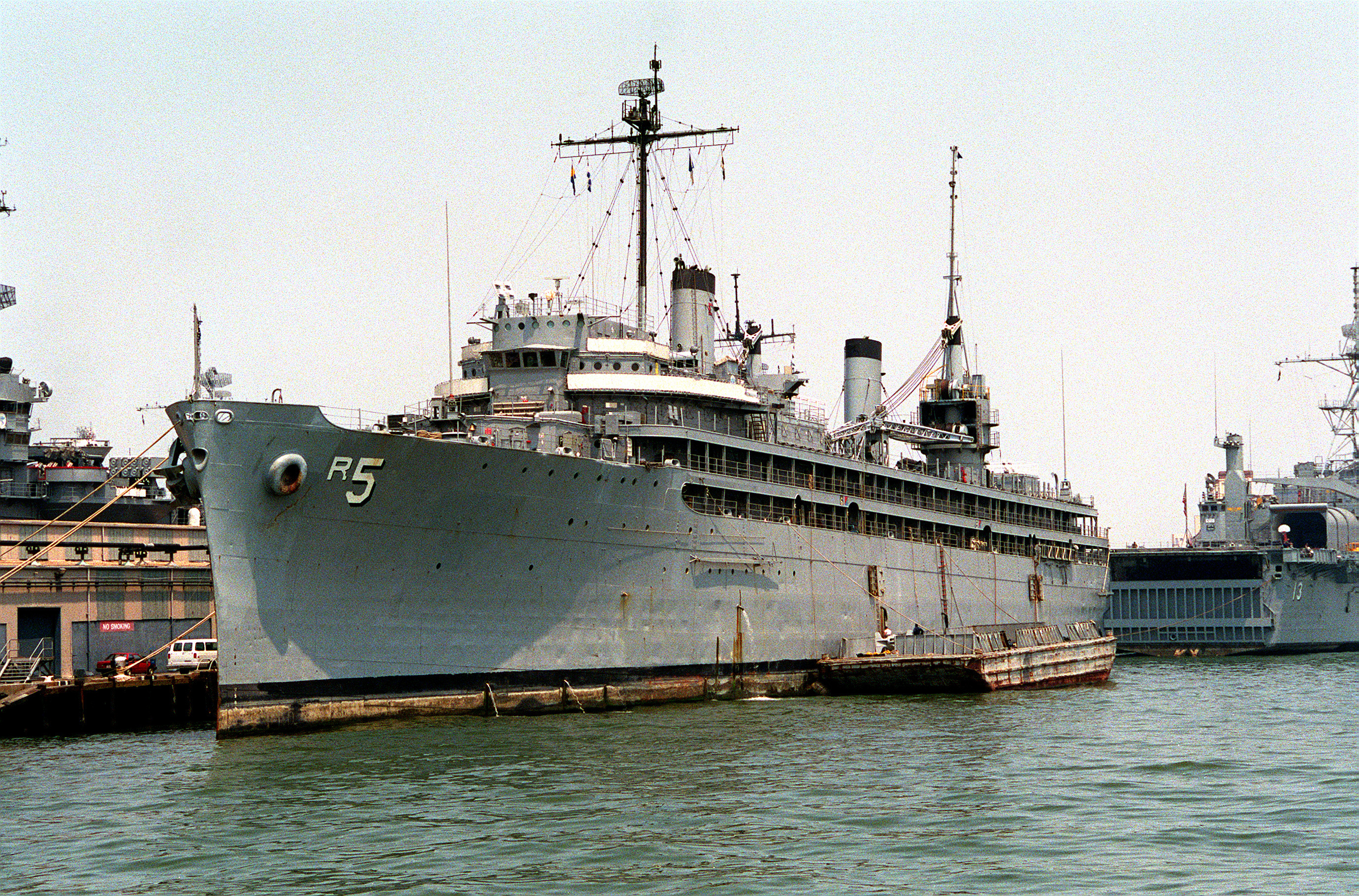
USS Vulcan (AR-5)

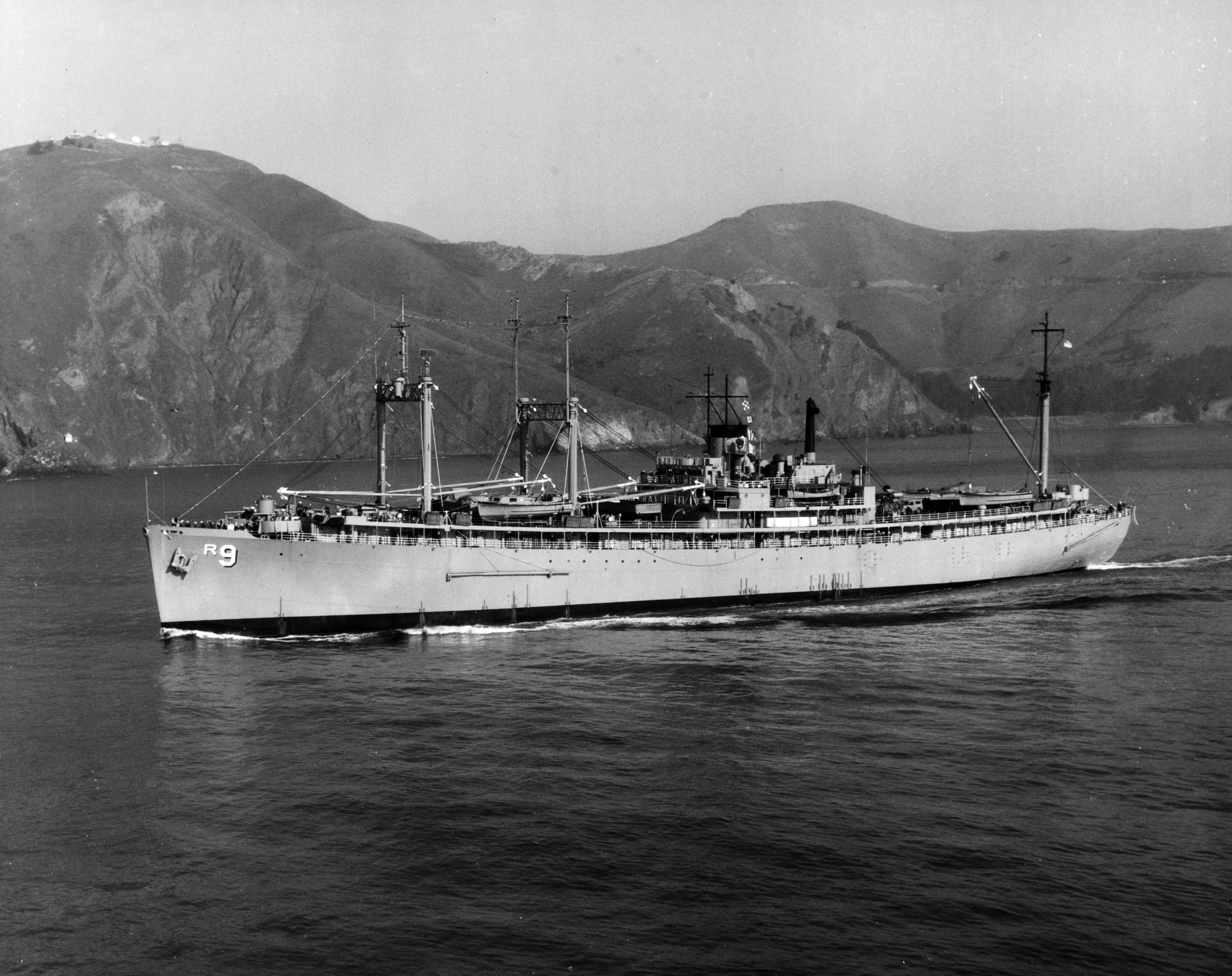
USS Delta (AR-9)

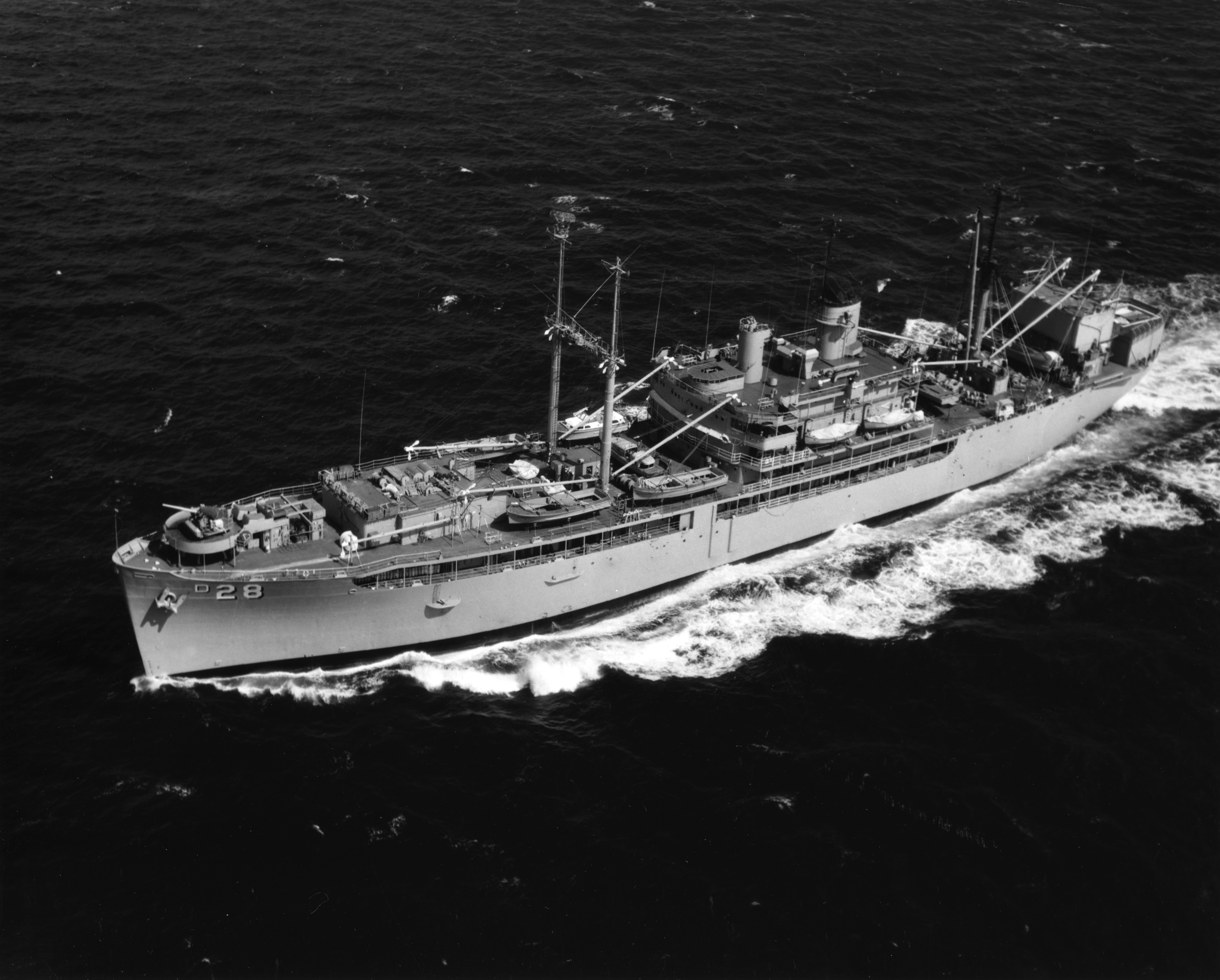
USS Grand Canyon (AR-28)

- USS Medusa (AR-1)
- USS Bridgeport (AR-2), ex-ID-3009, later AD-10
- USS Prometheus (AR-3), ex-AC-2
- USS Vestal (AR-4), ex-AC-1
- USS Alcor (AR-10), ex-AG-34, later AD-34

Vulcan-class

- USS Vulcan (AR-5)
- USS Ajax (AR-6), Operation Crossroads nuclear test participant
- USS Hector (AR-7)
- USS Jason (AR-8), ex-ARH-1

Delta-class: MC type C3

- USS Delta (AR-9), ex-AK-29
- USS Briareus (AR-12)

Altair-class

- USS Rigel (AR-11), ex-AD-13, ARb-1

Amphion-class

- USS Amphion (AR-13)
- USS Cadmus (AR-14)
- USS Deucalion (AR-15), canceled 12 August 1945
- USS Mars (AR-16), canceled 12 August 1945

Xanthus-class: MC type EC2-S-C1

- (AR-17) HMS Assistance (F173)
- (AR-18) HMS Diligence (F174)
- USS Xanthus (AR-19)
- USS Laertes (AR-20)
- USS Dionysus (AR-21)

Klondike-class: MC type C3

- USS Klondike (AR-22), ex-AD-22
- USS Markab (AR-23), ex-AD-21

Shenandoah-class: MA type C3

- USS Grand Canyon (AR-28), ex-AD-28

== Battle damage repair ships (ARB) ==
USS Aristaeus (ARB-1)

- USS Aristaeus (ARB-1), ex-LST-329
- USS Oceanus (ARB-2), ex-LST-328
- USS Phaon (ARB-3), ex-LST-15, Operation Crossroads participant
- USS Zeus (ARB-4), ex-LST-132
- USS Midas (ARB-5), ex-LST-514
- USS Nestor (ARB-6), ex-LST-491, wrecked by Typhoon Louise Okinawa October 1945
- USS Sarpedon (ARB-7), ex-LST-956
- USS Telamon (ARB-8), ex-LST-976, Operation Crossroads participant
- USS Ulysses (ARB-9), ex-LST-967
- USS Demeter (ARB-10), ex-LST-1121
- USS Diomedes (ARB-11), ex-LST-1119
- USS Helios (ARB-12), ex-LST-1127
- USS ARB-13, ex-LST-50

== Base repair ship (ARb) ==
- USS Rigel (ARb-1), ex-AD-13, later AR-11

== Cable repair ships (ARC) ==
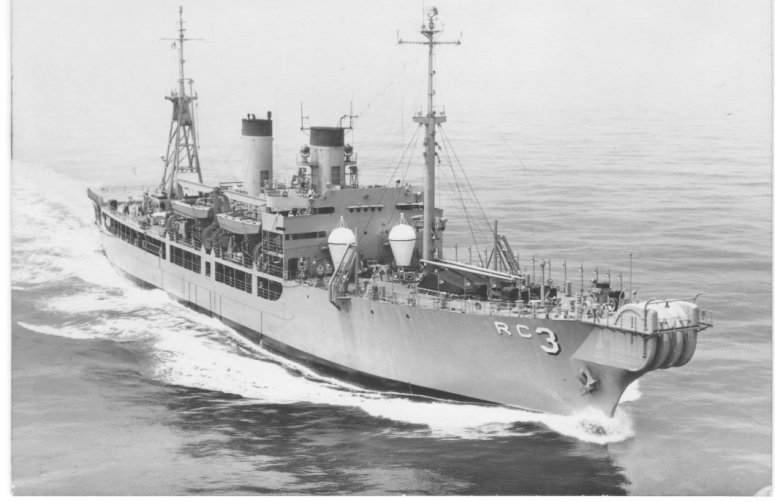
USS Aeolus (ARC-3)

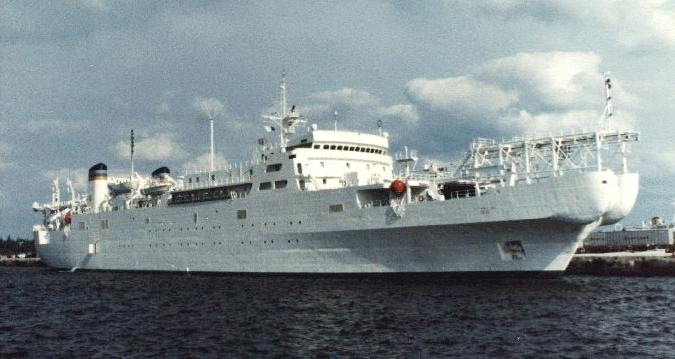
USNS Zeus (T-ARC-7)

- USS Portunus (ARC-1), ex-LSM–275
- USS Yamacraw (ARC-5), ex-ACM-9

Aeolus-class: MA type S4–SE2–BE1

- USS Aeolus (ARC-3), ex-AKA-47
- USS Thor (ARC-4), ex-AKA-49

Neptune-class: MA type S3-S2-BP1

- USNS Neptune (T-ARC-2)
- USNS Albert J. Myer (T-ARC-6)

Zeus-class

- USNS Zeus (T-ARC-7) [A]

Two other Navy vessels performed cable support operations without the ARC hull classification: USS Nashawena (AG-142 / YAG-35) and Kailua (IX-71).

== Internal combustion engine repair ships (ARG) ==
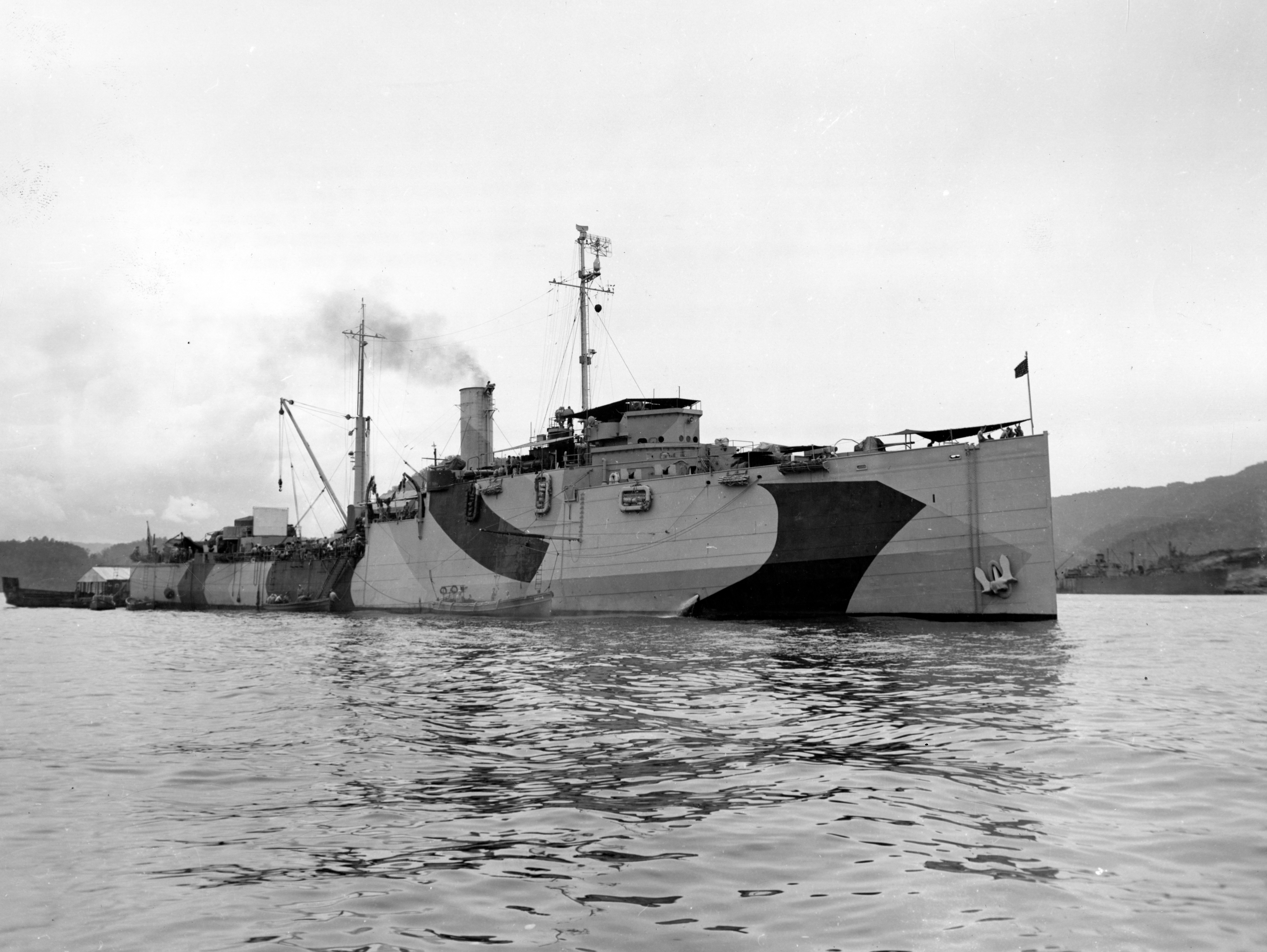
USS Oglala (ARG-1)

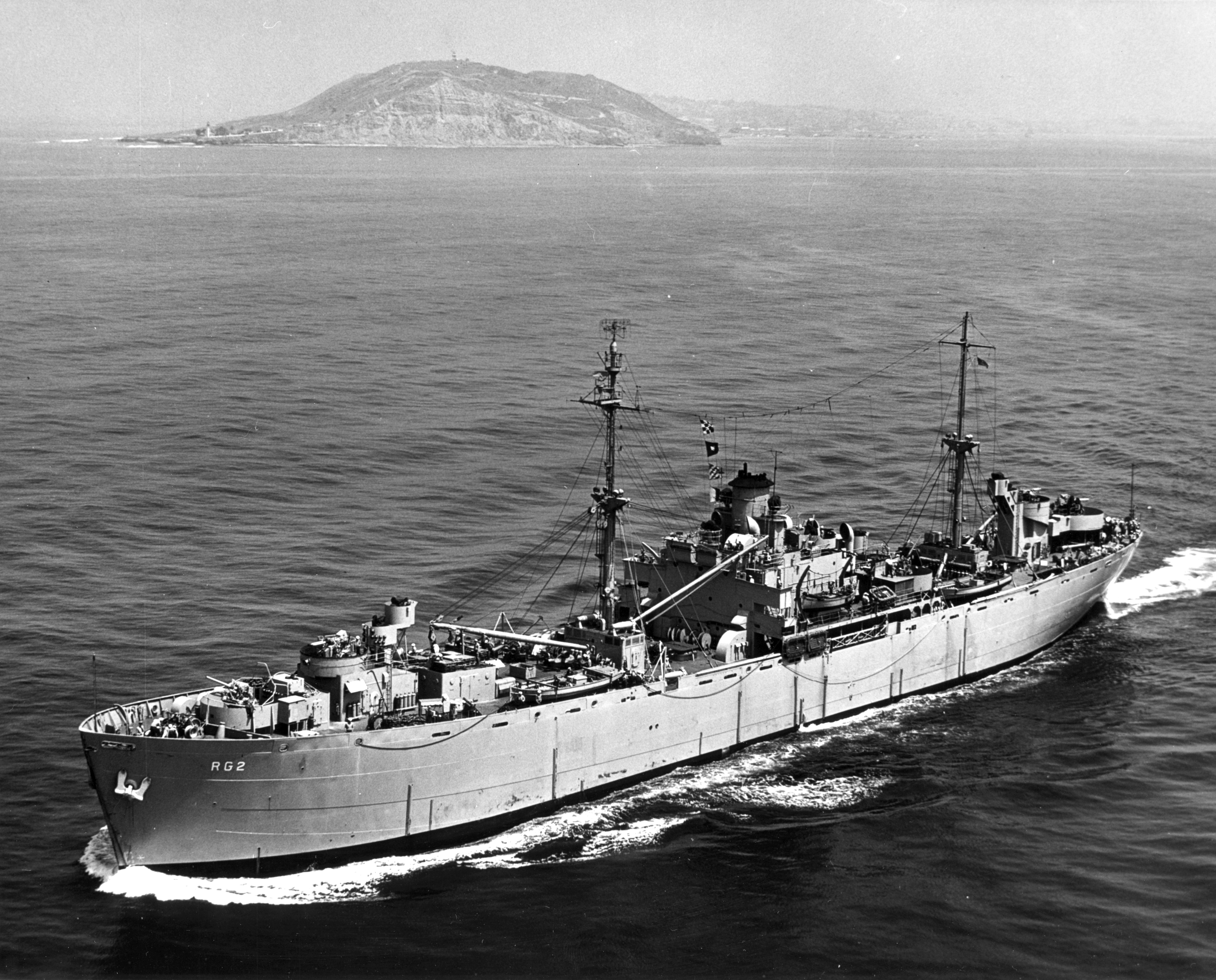
SS Luzon (ARG-2)

Aroostook-class

- USS Oglala (ARG-1), ex-CM-4

Luzon-class: MC type EC2-S-C1

- USS Luzon (ARG-2)
- USS Mindanao (ARG-3)
- USS Tutuila (ARG-4)
- USS Oahu (ARG-5)
- USS Cebu (ARG-6), Operation Crossroads nuclear test participant
- USS Culebra Island (ARG-7)
- USS Leyte (ARG-8), renamed USS Maui
- USS Mona Island (ARG-9)
- USS Palawan (ARG-10)
- USS Samar (ARG-11)
- USS Kermit Roosevelt (ARG-16)
- USS Hooper Island (ARG-17)

Basilan-class: MC type EC2-S-C1

- USS Basilan (ARG-12), ex-AG-68
- USS Burias (ARG-13), ex-AG-69

Other ships

- USS Dumaran (ARG-14), later ARV-1
- USS Masbate (ARG-15), later ARV-2
- USS Holland (ARG-18), ex-AS-3
- USS Beaver (ARG-19), ex-ID-2302, ex-AS-5
- USS Otus (ARG-20), ex-AS-20

== Heavy-hull repair ship (ARH) ==
- USS Jason (ARH-1), later AR-8

== Landing craft repair ships (ARL) ==
Achelous-class

- USS Achelous (ARL-1), ex-LST-10
- USS Amycus (ARL-2), ex-LST-489
- USS Agenor (ARL-3), ex-LST-490
- USS Adonis (ARL-4), ex-LST-83
- USS ARL-5, ex-LST-81
- USS ARL-6, ex-LST-82
- USS Atlas (ARL-7), ex-LST-231
- USS Egeria (ARL-8), ex-LST-136
- USS Endymion (ARL-9), ex-LST-513
- USS Coronis (ARL-10), ex-LST-1003
- USS Creon (ARL-11), ex-LST-1036, Operation Crossroads nuclear test participant
- USS Poseidon (ARL-12), ex-LST-1037
- USS Menelaus (ARL-13), ex-LST-971
- USS Minos (ARL-14), ex-LST-644
- USS Minotaur (ARL-15), ex-LST-645
- USS Myrmidon (ARL-16), ex-LST-948
- USS Numitor (ARL-17), ex-LST-954
- USS Pandemus (ARL-18), ex-LST-650
- USS Patroclus (ARL-19), ex-LST-955
- USS Pentheus (ARL-20), ex-LST-1115
- USS Proserpine (ARL-21), ex-LST-1116
- USS Romulus (ARL-22), ex-LST-961
- USS Satyr (ARL-23), ex-LST-852
- USS Sphinx (ARL-24), ex-LST-962, Operation Crossroads participant
- USS ARL-25, canceled
- USS Stentor (ARL-26), ex-LST-858
- USS Tantalus (ARL-27), ex-LST-1117
- USS Typhon (ARL-28), ex-LST-1118
- USS Amphitrite (ARL-29), ex-LST-1124
- USS Askari (ARL-30), ex-LST-1131, Operation Sandstone nuclear test participant
- USS Bellerophon (ARL-31), ex-LST-1132
- USS Bellona (ARL-32), ex-LST-1136, grounded Iwo Jima 1 December 1945
- USS Chimaera (ARL-33), ex-LST-1137
- USS ARL-34, canceled
- USS Daedalus (ARL-35), ex-LST-1143
- USS Gordius (ARL-36), ex-LST-1145
- USS Indra (ARL-37), ex-LST-1147
- USS Krishna (ARL-38), ex-LST-1149
- USS Quirinus (ARL-39), ex-LST-1151
- USS Remus (ARL-40), ex-LST-453
- USS Achilles (ARL-41), ex-LST-455
- USS Aeolus (ARL-42), conversion from LST-310 cancelled
- USS Cerberus (ARL-43), conversion from LST-316, cancelled
- USS Conus (ARL-44), conversion from LST-317 cancelled
- USS Feronia (ARL-45), conversion from LST-332 cancelled
- USS Chandra (ARL-46), conversion from LST-350 cancelled
- USS Minerva (ARL-47), conversion from LST-374 cancelled

== Rescue and salvage ships (ARS) ==
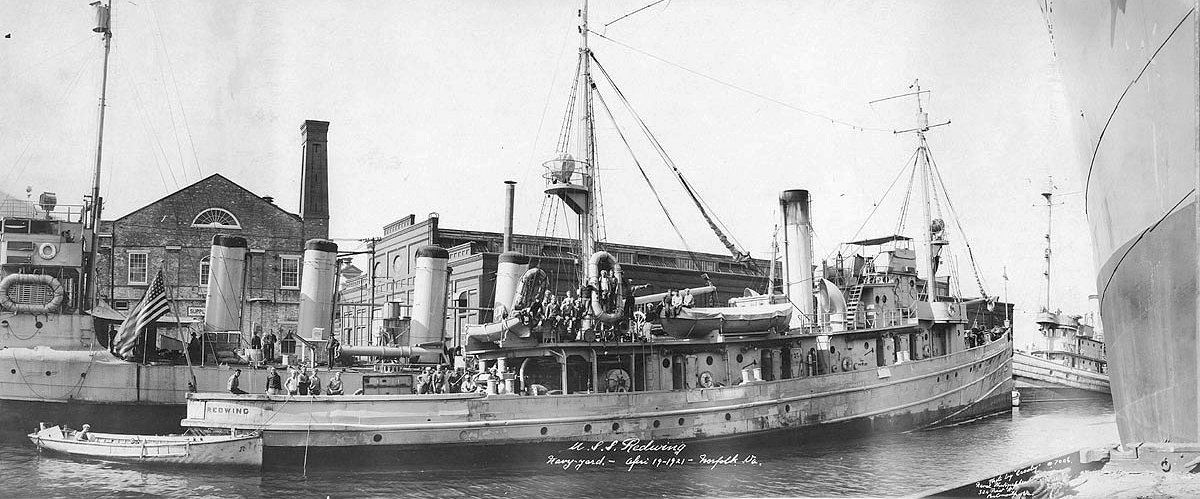
USS Redwing (ARS-4) as (AM-48)

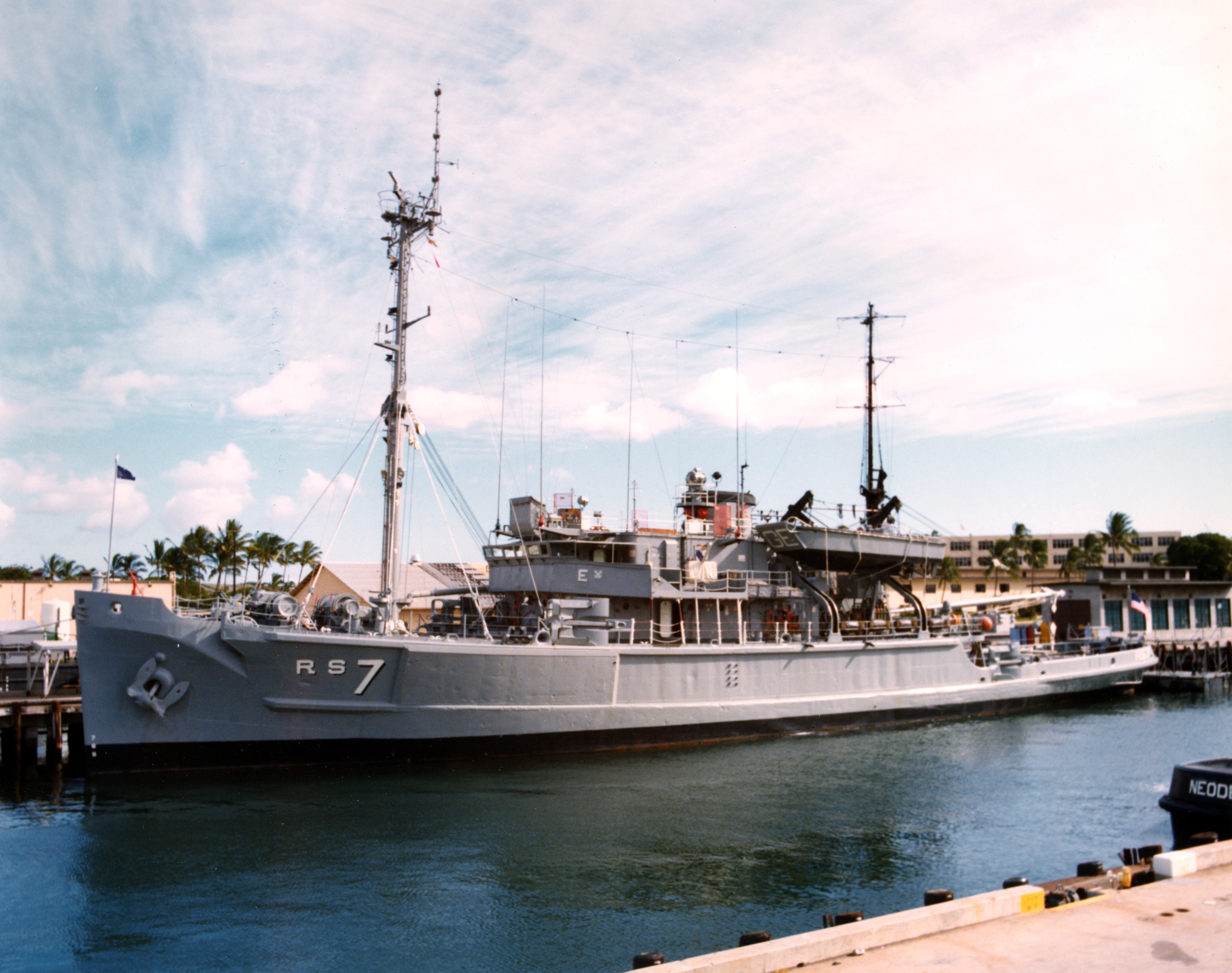
USS Grapple (ARS-7)

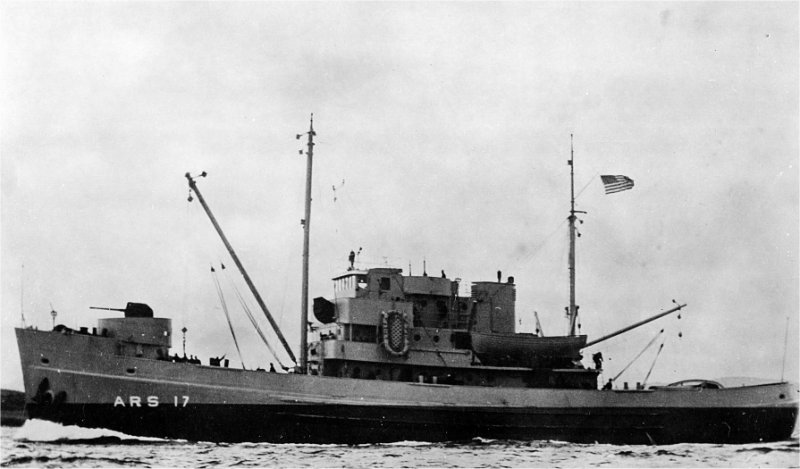
USS Restorer (ARS-17)

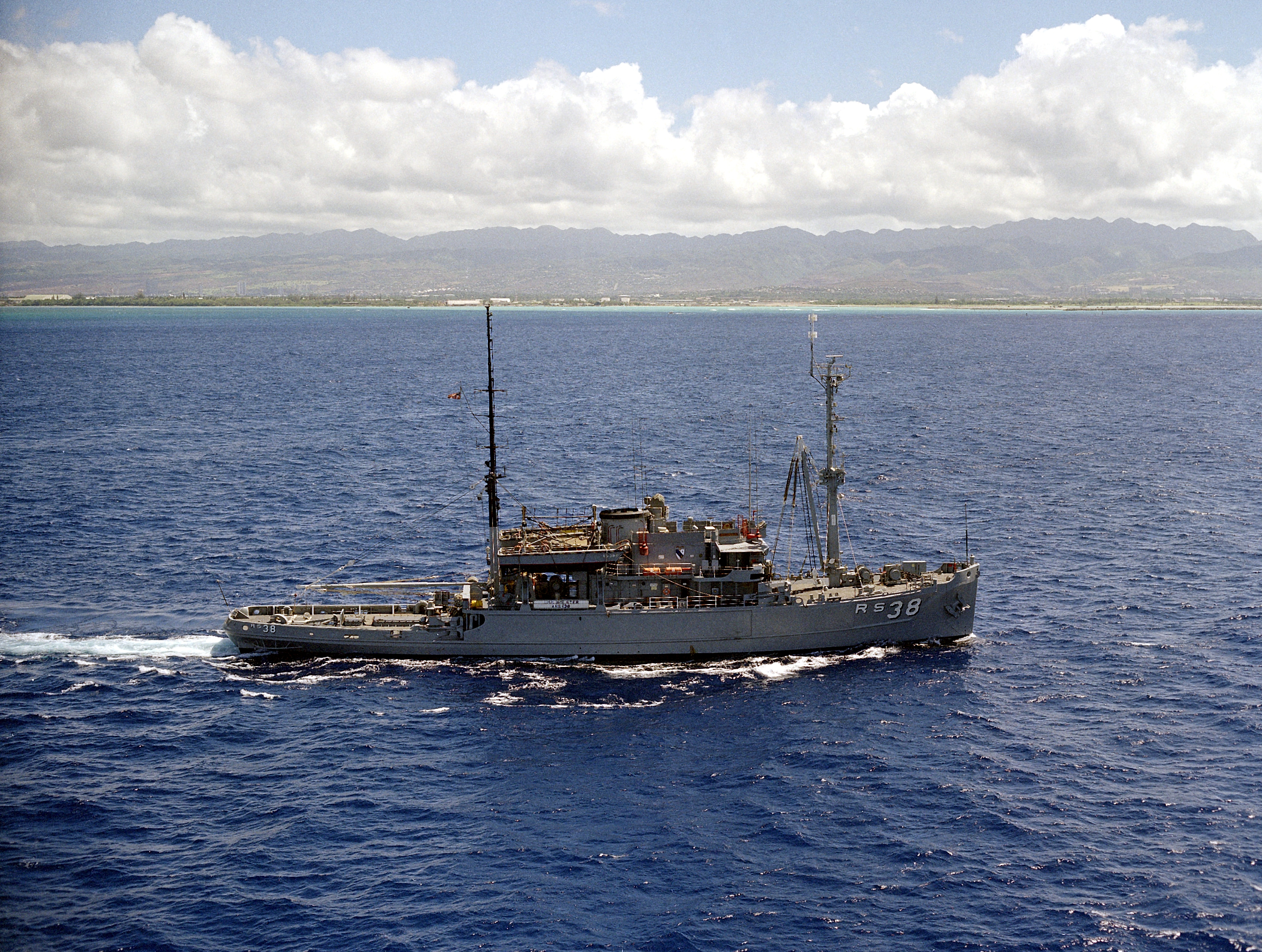
USS Bolster (ARS-38)

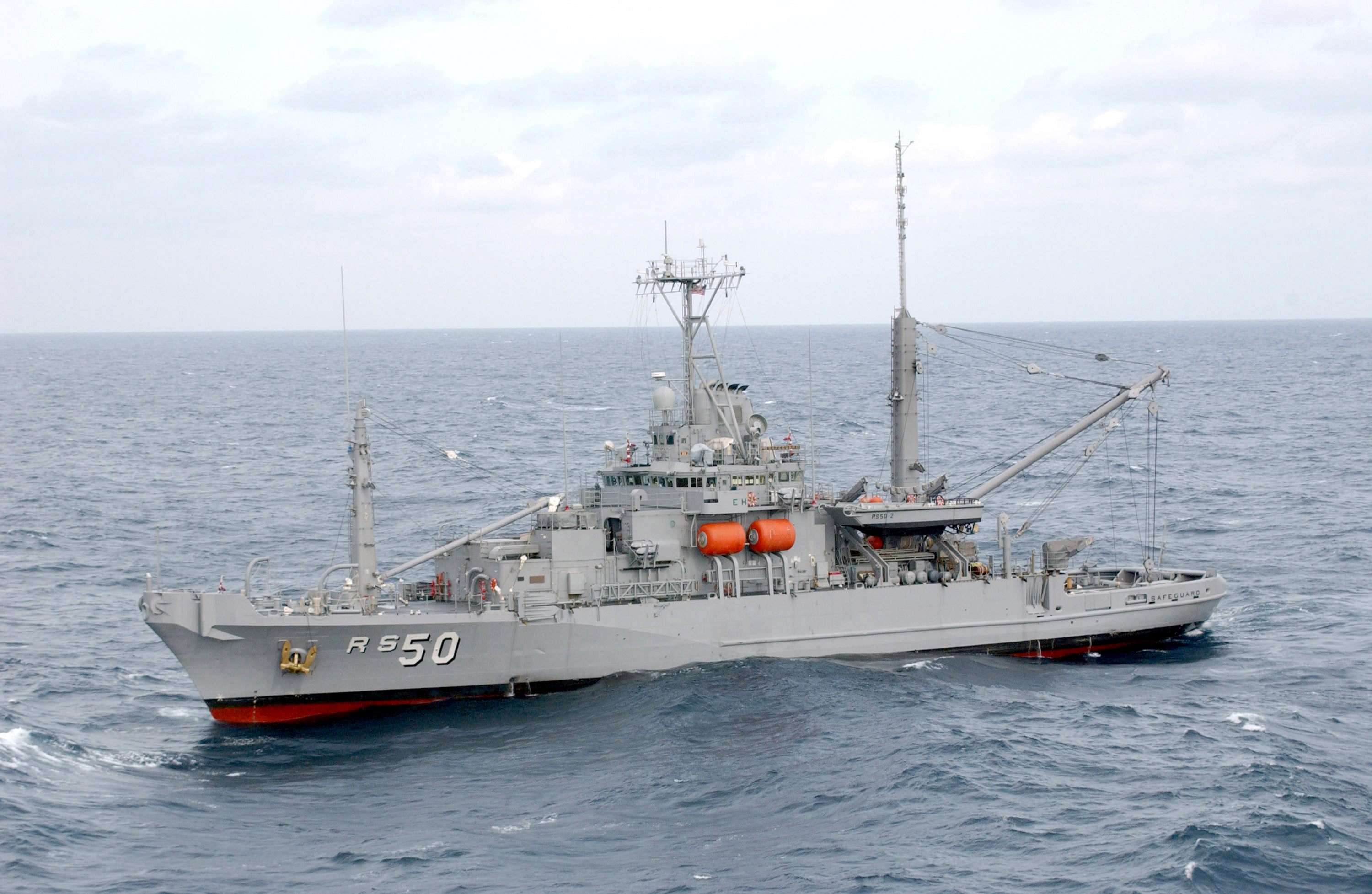
USS Safeguard (ARS-50)

Lapwing-class

- USS Viking (ARS-1), ex-AM-32
- USS Crusader (ARS-2), ex-AM-29
- USS Discoverer (ARS-3), ex-AM-38
- USS Redwing (ARS-4), ex-AM-48, sunk from an underwater explosion off Bizerte, North Africa 29 June 1943
- USS Warbler (ARS-11), ex-AM-53
- USS Willet (ARS-12), ex-AM-54
- USS Brant (ARS-32), ex-AM-24

Diver-class

- USS Diver (ARS-5)
- USS Escape (ARS-6)
- USS Grapple (ARS-7), Operation Dominic nuclear test participant
- USS Preserver (ARS-8), Operation Crossroads nuclear test participant
- USS Shackle (ARS-9)
- USS Protector (ARS-14)
- USS Cable (ARS-19)
- USS Chain (ARS-20), later T-AGOR-17
- USS Curb (ARS-21)
- USS Current (ARS-22), Operation Crossroads participant
- USS Deliver (ARS-23), nuclear tests participant (Note: USS Deliver participated in Operation Crossroads and Operation Dominic)
- USS Grasp (ARS-24)
- USS Safeguard (ARS-25), Operation Dominic participant
- USS Seize (ARS-26)
- USS Snatch (ARS-27), later T-AGOR-18
- USS Valve (ARS-28)
- USS Vent (ARS-29)
- USS Clamp (ARS-33), Operation Crossroads participant
- USS Gear (ARS-34)

Unknown class

- USS Assistance (ARS-10), not commissioned

Anchor-class

- USS Anchor (ARS-13)
- USS Extractor (ARS-15), sunk by friendly fire 24 January 1945, 6 killed
- USS Extricate (ARS-16), wrecked by Typhoon Louise Okinawa October 1945
- USS Restorer (ARS-17)

Rescuer-class

- USS Rescuer (ARS-18), wrecked 31 December 1942 at Unimak Island in the Aleutians, 1 killed

Ex-commercial vessels

- USS Accelerate (ARS-30)
- USS Harjurand (ARS-31)

Weight-class

- USS Weight (ARS-35)
- USS Swivel (ARS-36)

Tackle-class

- USS Tackle (ARS-37), later ARST-4

Bolster-class

- USS Bolster (ARS-38), Operation Wigwam nuclear test participant
- USS Conserver (ARS-39), nuclear tests participant (Note: USS Conserver participated in Operation Crossroads and Operation Dominic)
- USS Hoist (ARS-40)
- USS Opportune (ARS-41)
- USS Reclaimer (ARS-42), nuclear tests participant (Note: USS Reclaimer participated in Operation Crossroads, Operation Castle, Operation Wigwam, and Operation Dominic)
- USS Recovery (ARS-43)
- USS Retriever (ARS-44), canceled 1945
- USS Skillful (ARS-45), canceled 1945
- USS Support (ARS-46), canceled 1945
- USS Toiler (ARS-47), canceled 1945
- USS Urgent (ARS-48), canceled 1945
- USS Willing (ARS-49), canceled 1945

Safeguard-class

- USS Safeguard (ARS-50) [I]
- USS Grasp (ARS-51) [A]
- USS Salvor (ARS-52) [A]
- USS Grapple (ARS-53) [I]
- ARS-54, canceled

== Salvage lifting vessels (ARSD) ==
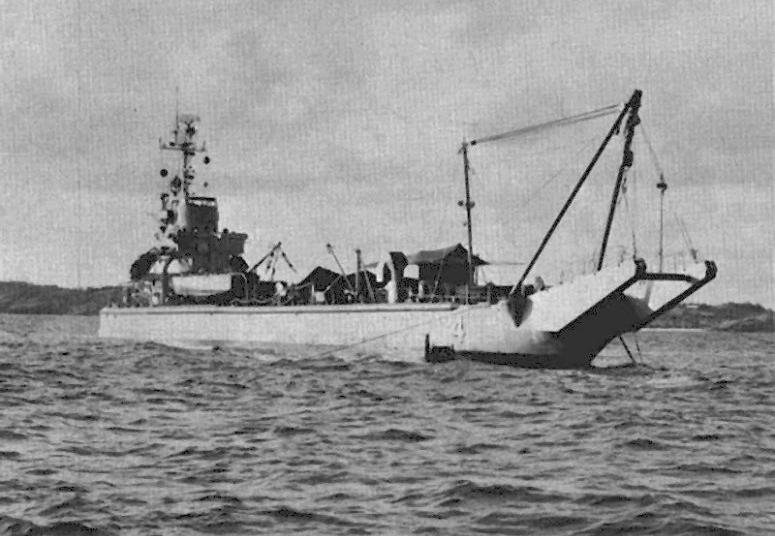
USS Windlass (ARS(D)-4)

- USS Gypsy (ARS(D)-1), ex-LSM-549, nuclear tests participant (Note: USS Gypsy participated in Operation Crossroads, Operation Castle, and Operation Wigwam)
- USS Mender (ARS(D)-2), ex-LSM-550, nuclear tests participant (Note: USS Mender participated in Operation Crossroads and Operation Castle)
- USS Salvager (ARS(D)-3), ex-LSM-551, later YMLC-3
- USS Windlass (ARS(D)-4), ex-LSM-552, later YMLC-4

== Salvage craft tenders (ARST) ==
- USS Laysan Island (ARST-1), ex-LST-1098
- USS Okala (ARST-2), ex-LST-1099
- USS Palmyra (ARST-3), ex-LST-1100, Operation Crossroads participant
- USS Tackle (ARST-4), ex-ARS-37, later IX-217

== Aircraft repair ships (ARV, ARV(E), ARV(A)) ==
USS Chourre

Chourre-class: MC type EC2-S-C1

- USS Chourre (ARV-1) ex-ARG-14
- USS Webster (ARV-2) ex-ARG-15

Aventinus-class

- USS Aventinus (ARV(E)-3), ex-LST-1092
- USS Chloris (ARV(E)-4), ex-LST-1094

Fabius-class

- USS Fabius (ARV(A)-5), ex-LST-1093
- USS Megara (ARV(A)-6), ex-LST-1095

== Helicopter aircraft repair ships (ARVH) ==
- USNS Corpus Christi Bay (T-ARVH-1), ex-AV-5

== Submarine tenders (AS) ==
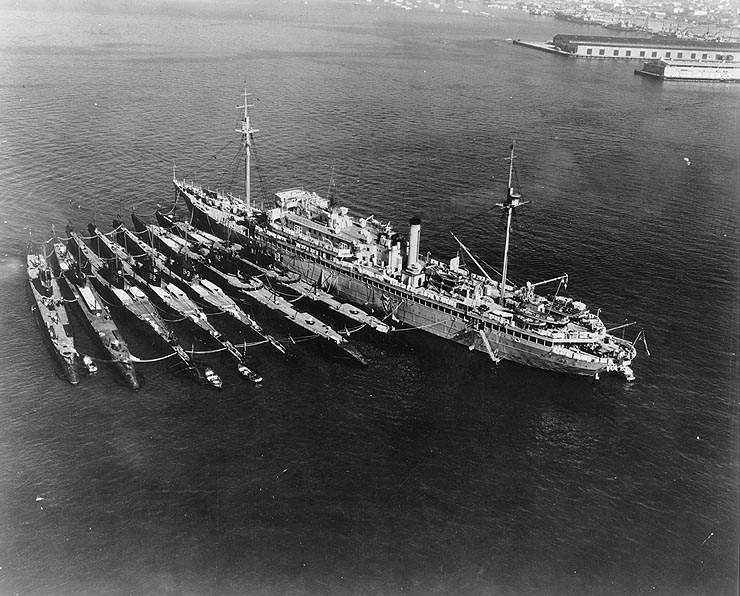
USS Holland (AS-3)

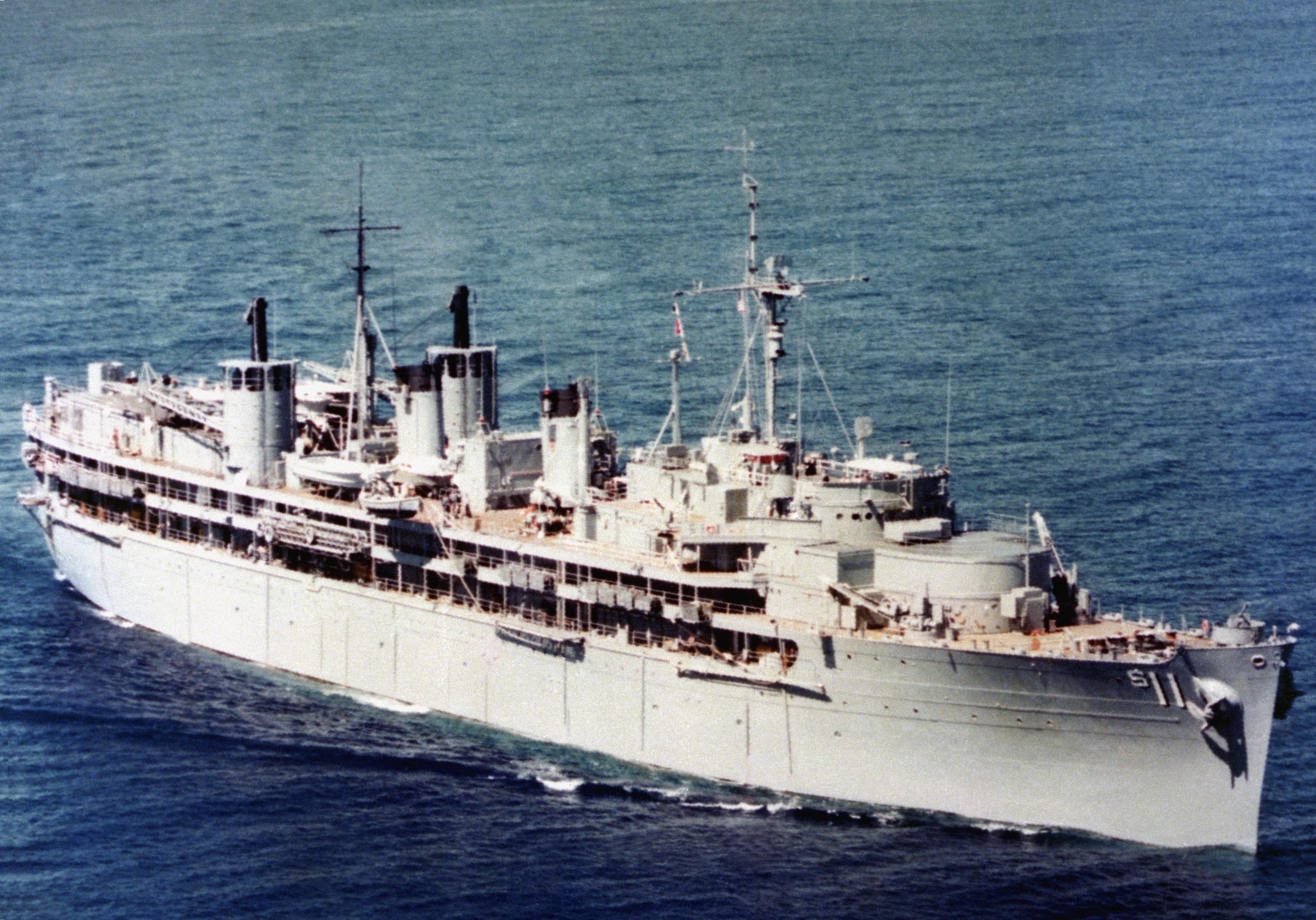
USS Fulton (AS-11)

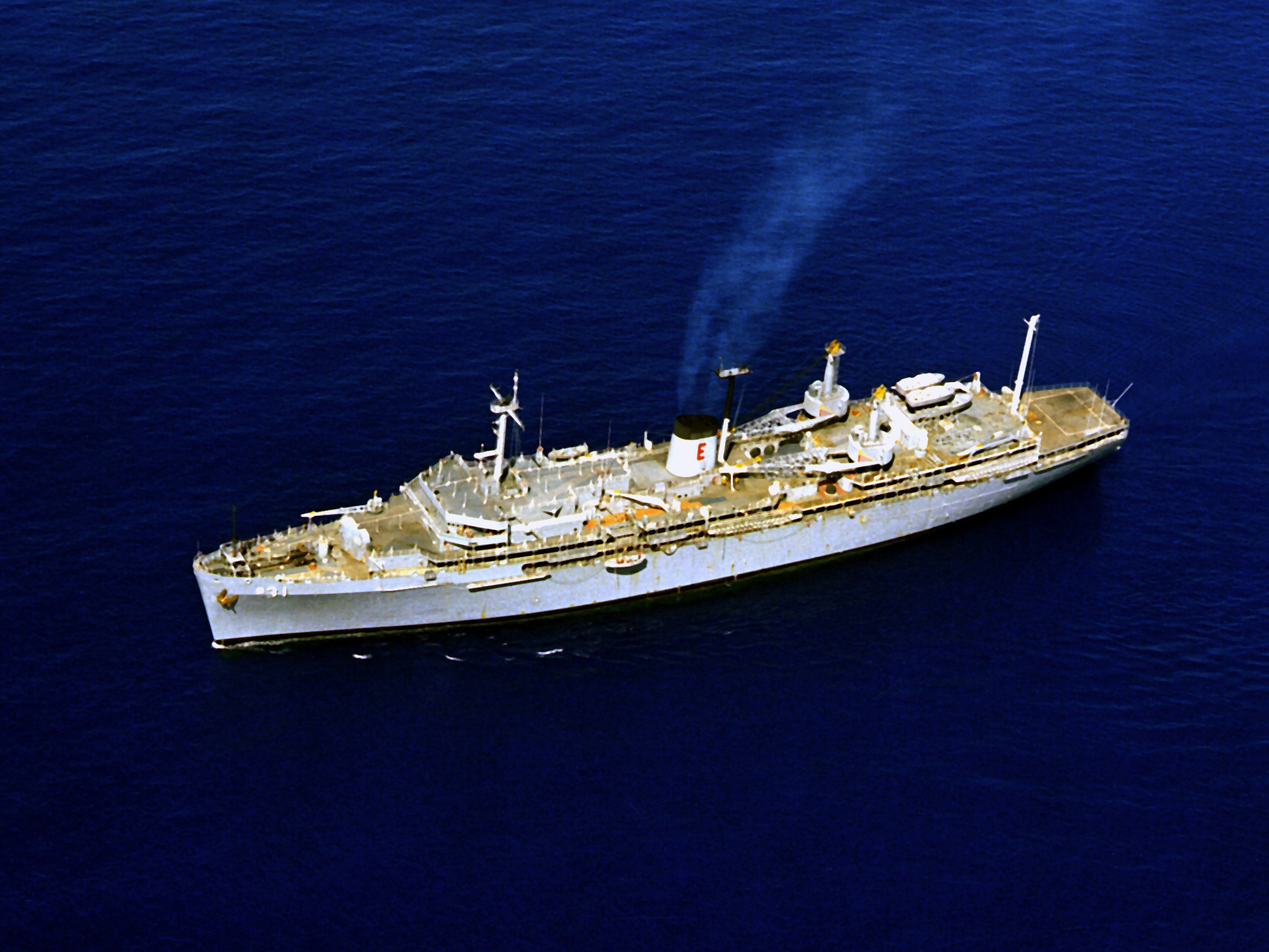
USS Hunley (AS-31)

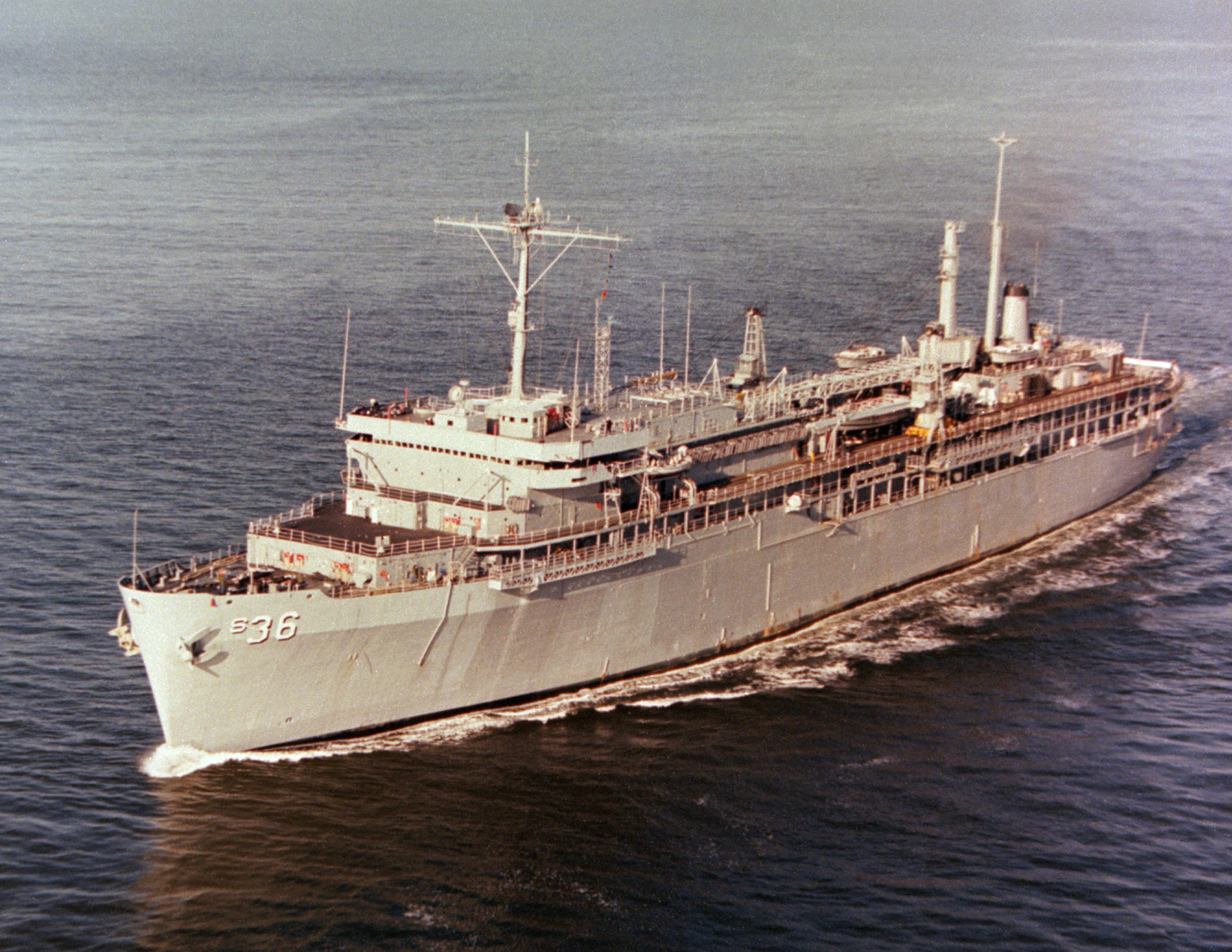
USS L.Y. Spear (AS-36)

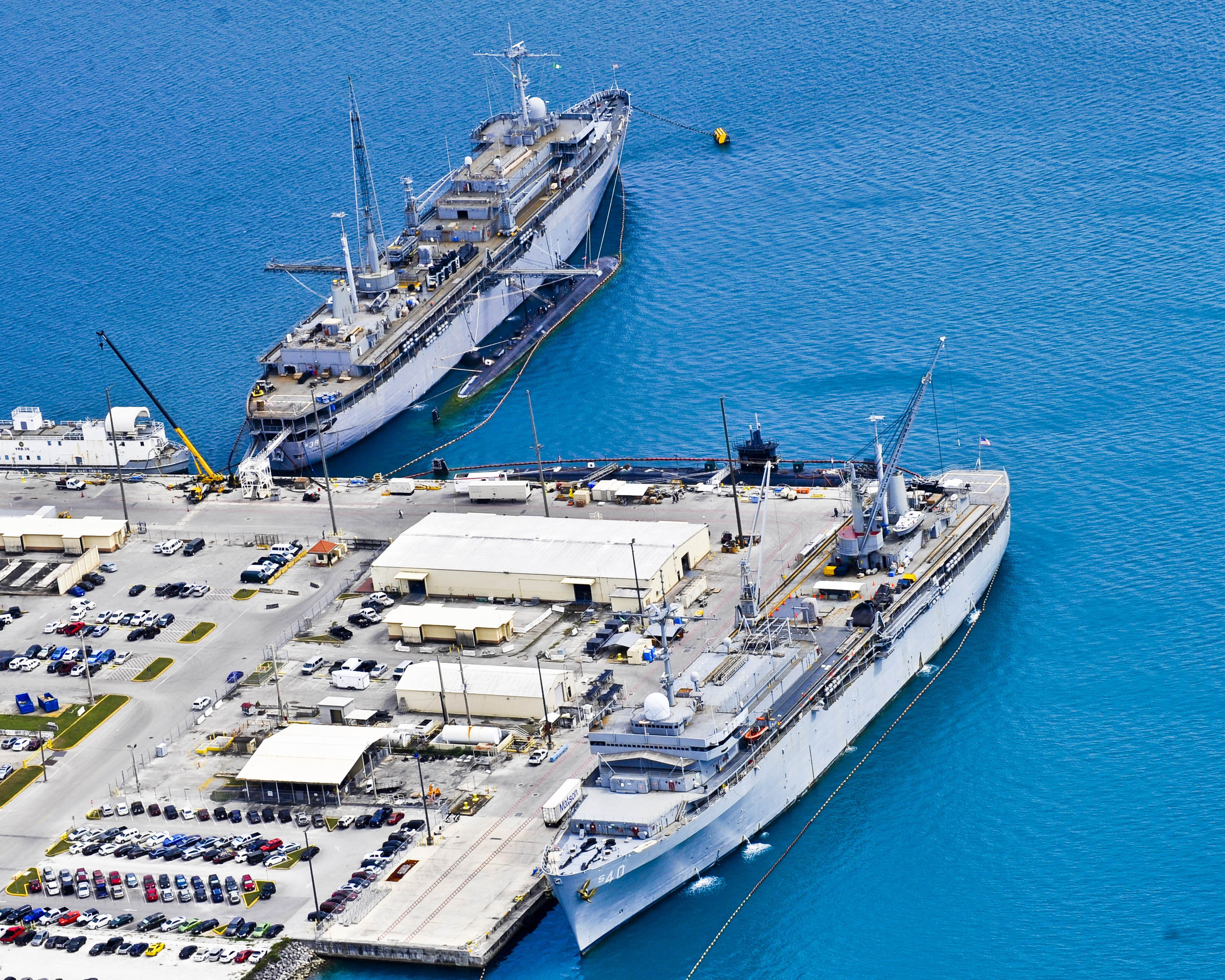
USS Emory S. Land (AS-39), top, and USS Frank Cable (AS-40)

Ships which have functioned as submarine tenders without the AS designation include the four Arkansas-class monitors.

- USS Fulton (AS-1), later PG-49
- USS Bushnell (AS-2), later AG-32, AGS-5
- USS Holland (AS-3), later ARG-18
- USS Alert (AS-4)
- USS Beaver (AS-5), ex-ID-2302, later ARG-19
- USS Camden (AS-6), ex-ID-3143, later IX-42
- USS Rainbow (AS-7)
- USS Savannah (AS-8), ex-ID-3015
- USS Canopus (AS-9), ex-ID-4352-A, scuttled Manila Bay 9 April 1942
- USS Argonne (AS-10), ex-AP-4, later AG-31

Fulton-class

- USS Fulton (AS-11), Operation Crossroads nuclear test participant
- USS Sperry (AS-12)
- USS Bushnell (AS-15)
- USS Howard W. Gilmore (AS-16)
- USS Nereus (AS-17)
- USS Orion (AS-18)
- USS Proteus (AS-19), later IX-518

Griffin-class: MC type C3

- USS Griffin (AS-13)
- USS Pelias (AS-14)

Ex-commercial ships

- USS Otus (AS-20), later ARG-20
- USS Antaeus (AS-21), later AG-67, AH-18
- USS Euryale (AS-22): MC type C3

Aegir-class: MC type C3-S-A2

- USS Aegir (AS-23)
- USS Anthedon (AS-24)
- USS Apollo (AS-25)
- USS Clytie (AS-26)

Uncertain class

- USS Canopus (AS-27), canceled, later AD-33
- USS New England (AS-28), canceled, later AD-32
- (AS-29) and (AS-30) cancelled

Hunley-class

- USS Hunley (AS-31)
- USS Holland (AS-32)

Simon Lake-class

- USS Simon Lake (AS-33)
- USS Canopus (AS-34)
- (AS-35) cancelled

L. Y. Spear-class

- USS L. Y. Spear (AS-36)
- USS Dixon (AS-37)
- (AS-38) cancelled

Emory S. Land-class

- USS Emory S. Land (AS-39) [A]
- USS Frank Cable (AS-40) [A]
- USS McKee (AS-41) [I]

== Submarine rescue vessels (ASR) ==
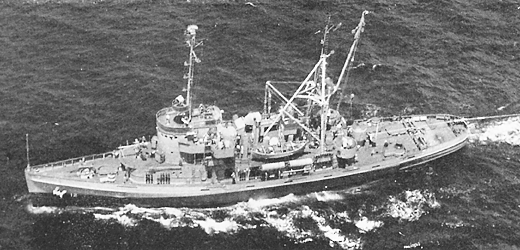
USS Penguin (ASR-12)

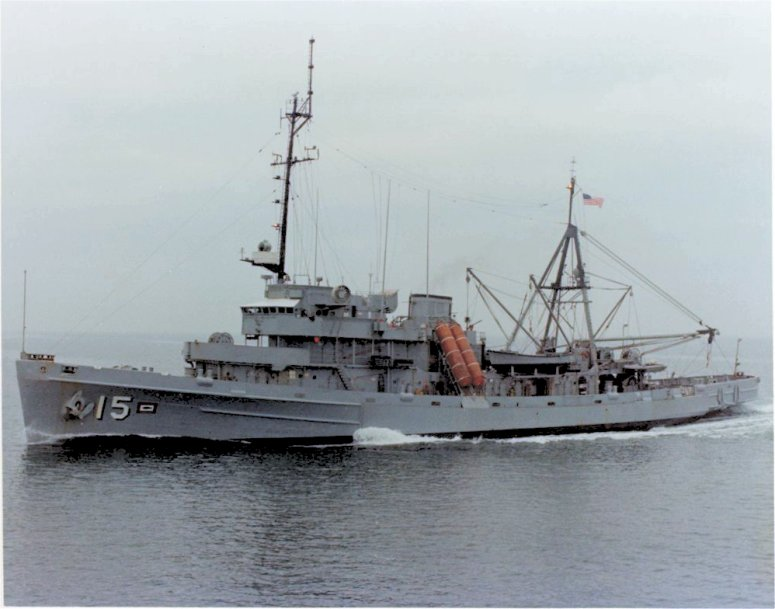
USS Sunbird (ASR-15)

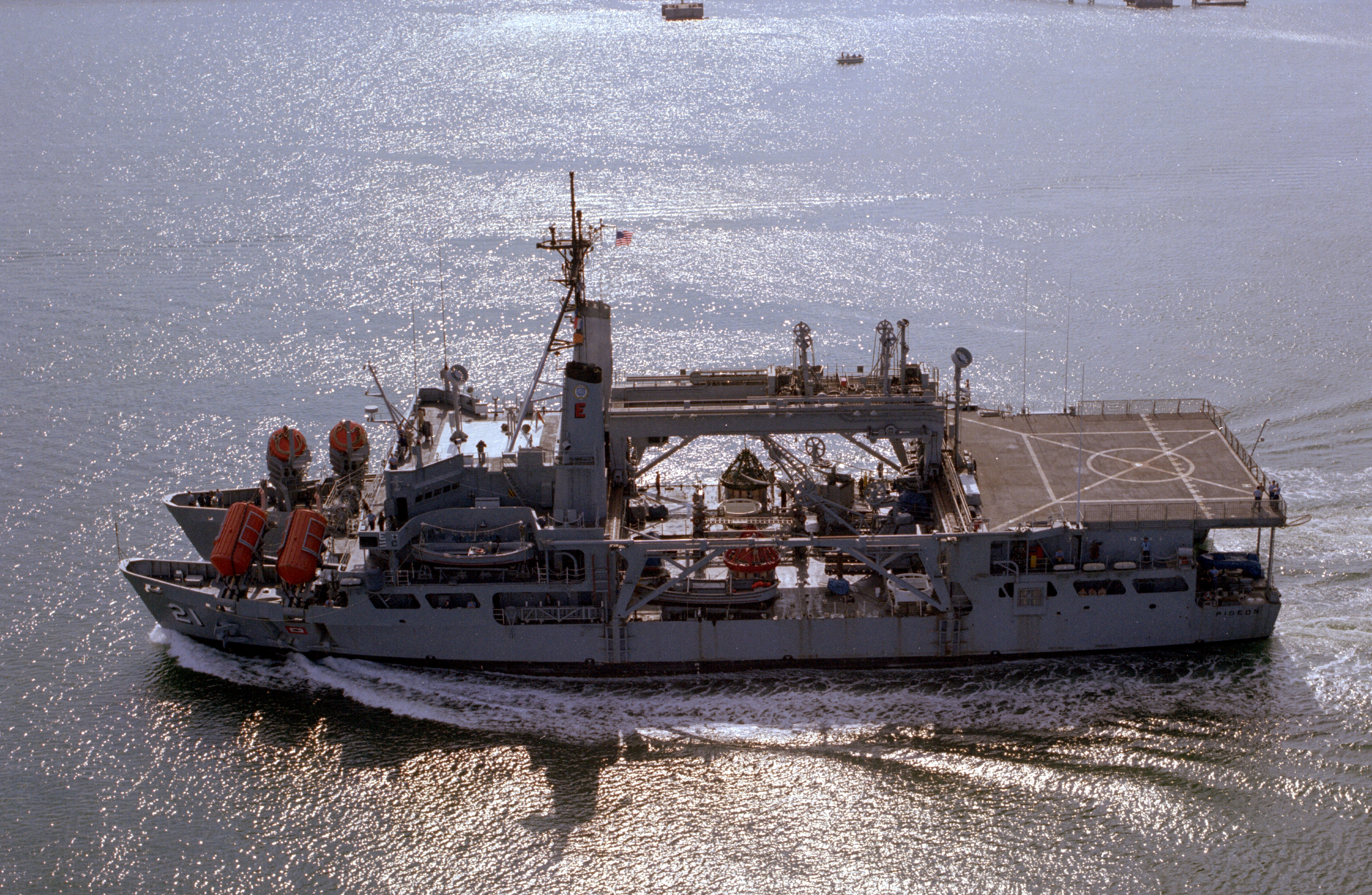
USS Pigeon (ASR-21)

Lapwing-class

- USS Widgeon (ASR-1), ex-AM-22, Operation Crossroads nuclear test participant
- USS Falcon (ASR-2), ex-AM-28
- USS Chewink (ASR-3), ex-AM-39
- USS Mallard (ASR-4), ex-AM-44
- USS Ortolan (ASR-5), ex-AM-45
- USS Pigeon (ASR-6), ex-AM-47, sunk in air attack, Manila Bay, PI, 4 May 1942

Chanticleer-class

- USS Chanticleer (ASR-7)
- USS Coucal (ASR-8), Operation Crossroads participant
- USS Florikan (ASR-9)
- USS Greenlet (ASR-10)
- USS Macaw (ASR-11), grounded 18 January 1944, sank 13 February 1944, 8 killed including 3 rescuers from Midway Island
- USS Kittiwake (ASR-13)
- USS Petrel (ASR-14)
- USS Sunbird (ASR-15)
- USS Tringa (ASR-16)
- USS Verdin (ASR-17), canceled 12 August 1945
- USS Windhover (ASR-18), canceled 12 August 1945

Penguin-class

- USS Penguin (ASR-12), ex-AT-99
- USS Bluebird (ASR-19), ex-ATF-164
- USS Skylark (ASR-20), ex-ATF-165, present during the loss of the USS Thresher (SSN-593)

Pigeon-class

The Pigeon-class was designed to operate deep submergence rescue vehicles (DSRV).

- USS Pigeon (ASR-21)
- USS Ortolan (ASR-22)

== Fleet tugs (AT) ==
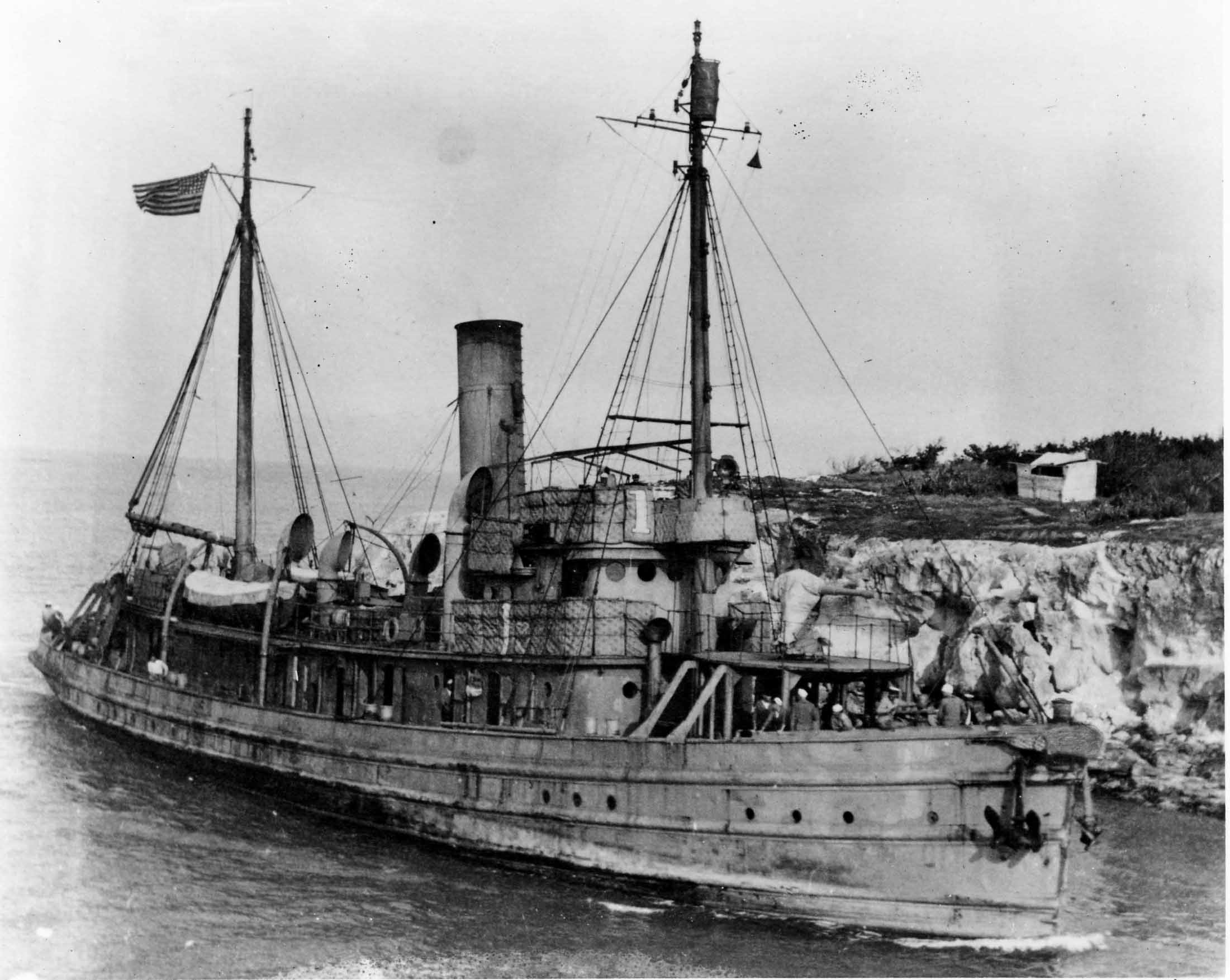
USS Sonoma (AT-12) as (ATO-12)

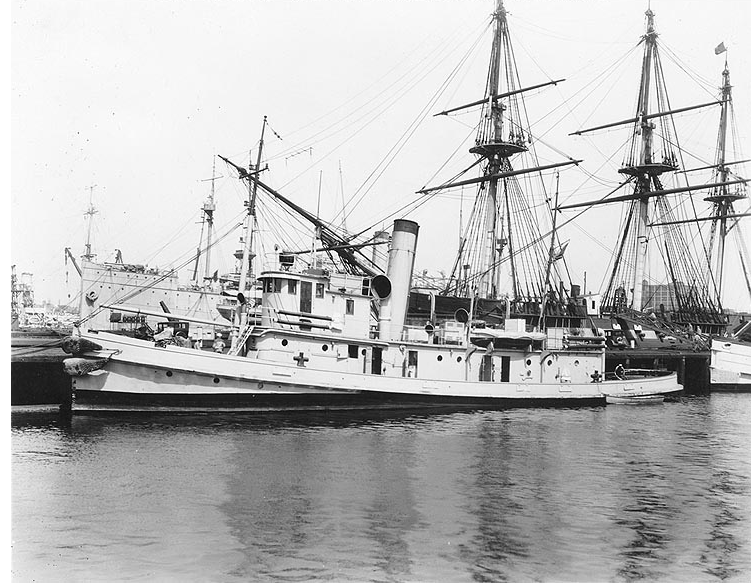
USS Mohave (AT-15)

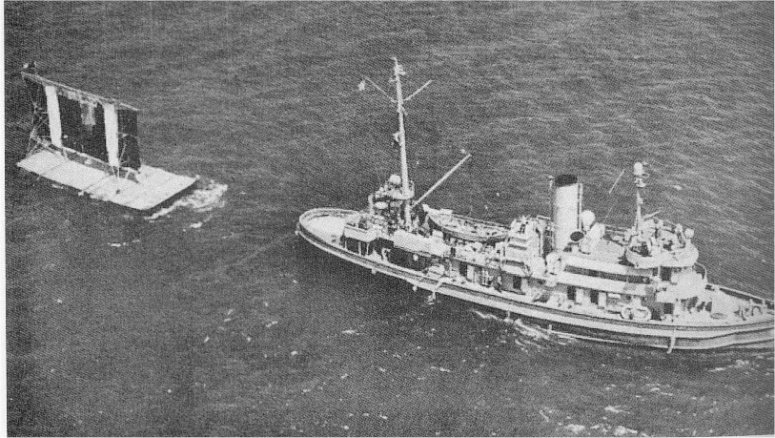
USS Kewaydin (AT-24) as (ATO-24)

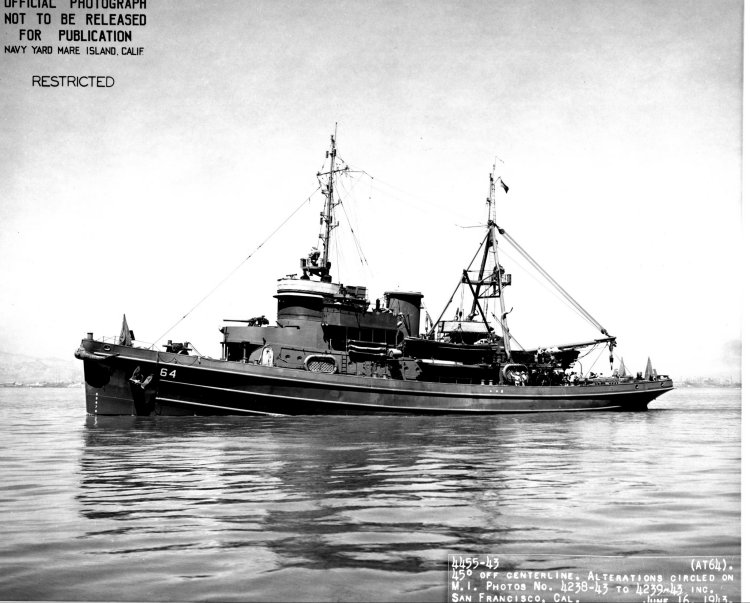
USS Navajo (AT-64)

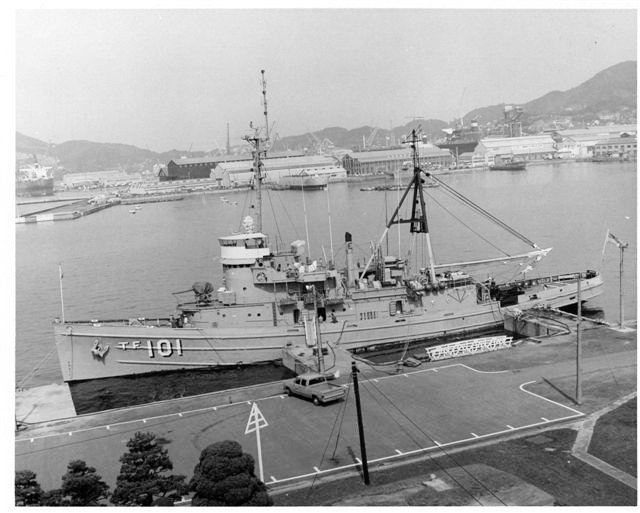
USS Cocopa (AT-101) as (ATF-101)

- USS Patapsco (AT-10)
- USS Patuxent (AT-11)
- USS Wando (AT-17), later YT-123
- USS Chemung (AT-18), later YT-124
- USS Allegheny (AT-19)
- AT-40 to AT-45 – Canceled 1918
- USS Iroquois (AT-46)
- USS Osceola (AT-47)
- USS Peoria (AT-48)
- USS Piscataqua (AT-49)
- USS Potomac (AT-50)
- USS Uncas (AT-51), later YT-110
- USS Navajo (AT-52), later IX-56
- USS AT-53
- USS Conestoga (AT-54), ex-SP-1128, disappeared June 1921, 56 killed
- USS Genesee (AT-55), ex-SP-1116, scuttled 5 May 1942 at Corregidor
- USS Lykens (AT-56), ex-SP-876
- USS Sea Rover (AT-57), ex-SP-1014
- USS Undaunted (AT-58)
- USS Challenge (AT-59), ex-SP-1015, later YT-126, YTM-126
- USS Bay Spring (AT-60)
- USS Cahokia (AT-61)
- USS Tamaroa (AT-62), later YT-136
- USS Acushnet (AT-63)
- USS Tuscarora (AT-77)
- USS Carib (AT-78)
- USS Yuma (AT-79)
- USS Yaqui (AT-80)
- USS AT-119
- USS AT-120
- USS Maricopa (AT-146)
- USS Esselen (AT-147)
- USS Chetco (AT-166)
- USS Chatot (AT-167)

Sonoma-class

- USS Sonoma (AT-12)
- USS Ontario (AT-13)

Arapaho-class

- USS Arapaho (AT-14), later YT-121
- USS Mohave (AT-15), wrecked 13 February 1928, 3 killed
- USS Tillamook (AT-16), later YT-122

Bagaduce-class

- USS Sagamore (AT-20)
- USS Bagaduce (AT-21)
- USS Tadousac (AT-22)
- USS Kalmia (AT-23)
- USS Kewaydin (AT-24)
- USS Umpqua (AT-25)
- USS Wandank (AT-26)
- USS Tatnuck (AT-27)
- USS Sunnadin (AT-28)
- USS Mahopac (AT-29)
- USS Sciota (AT-30)
- USS Koka (AT-31), grounded 7 December 1937
- USS Napa (AT-32), scuttled to avoid capture 8 April 1942
- USS Pinola (AT-33)
- USS Algorma (AT-34)
- USS Carrabasset (AT-35)
- USS Contocook (AT-36)
- USS Iuka (AT-37)
- USS Keosanqua (AT-38)
- USS Montcalm (AT-39)

Cherokee-class

- USS Navajo (AT-64), sunk by torpedo 12 September 1943, 17 killed
- USS Seminole (AT-65), sunk by naval gunfire Tulagi 25 October 1942, 1 killed
- USS Cherokee (AT-66)
- USS Apache (AT-67)
- USS Arapaho (AT-68)
- USS Chippewa (AT-69)
- USS Choctaw (AT-70)
- USS Hopi (AT-71)
- USS Kiowa (AT-72)
- USS Menominee (AT-73)
- USS Pawnee (AT-74)
- USS Sioux (AT-75)
- USS Ute (AT-76)
- USS Bannock (AT-81)
- USS Carib (AT-82)
- USS Chickasaw (AT-83)
- USS Cree (AT-84)
- USS Lipan (AT-85)
- USS Mataco (AT-86)
- USS Moreno (AT-87)
- USS Narragansett (AT-88)
- USS Nauset (AT-89), sunk in air attack 9 September 1943, 18 killed or missing
- USS Pinto (AT-90)
- USS Seneca (AT-91)
- USS Tawasa (AT-92)
- USS Tekesta (AT-93)
- USS Yuma (AT-94)
- USS Zuni (AT-95)
- USS Chilula (AT-153)

Abnaki-class

- USS Abnaki (AT-96)
- USS Alsea (AT-97)
- USS Arikara (AT-98)
- USS Chetco (AT-99), later ASR-12
- USS Chowanoc (AT-100)
- USS Cocopa (AT-101)
- USS Hidatsa (AT-102)
- USS Hitchiti (AT-103)
- USS Jicarilla (AT-104)
- USS Moctobi (AT-105)
- USS Molala (AT-106)
- USS Munsee (AT-107)
- USS Pakana (AT-108)
- USS Potawatomi (AT-109)
- USS Quapaw (AT-110)
- USS Sarsi (AT-111)
- USS Seranno (AT-112)
- USS Takelma (AT-113)
- USS Tawakoni (AT-114)
- USS Tenino (AT-115)
- USS Tolowa (AT-116)
- USS Wateree (AT-117)
- USS Wenatchee (AT-118)
- USS Achomawi (AT-148)
- USS Atakapa (AT-149)
- USS Avoyel (AT-150)
- USS Chawasha (AT-151)
- USS Cahuilla (AT-152)
- USS Chimariko (AT-154)
- USS Cusabo (AT-155)
- USS Luiseno (AT-156)
- USS Nipmuc (AT-157)
- USS Mosopelea (AT-158)
- USS Paiute (AT-159)
- USS Papago (AT-160)
- USS Salinan (AT-161)
- USS Shakori (AT-162)
- USS Utina (AT-163)
- USS Yurok (AT-164)
- USS Yustaga (AT-165)

Sotoyomo-class

- USS AT-121
- USS AT-122
- USS AT-123
- USS AT-124
- USS AT-125
- USS AT-126
- USS AT-127
- USS AT-128
- USS AT-129
- USS AT-130

Lapwing-class

- USS Bobolink (AT-131), ex-AM-20
- USS Brant (AT-132), ex-AM-24, later ARS-32
- USS Cormorant (AT-133), ex-AM-40
- USS Grebe (AT-134), ex-AM-43, grounded 6 December 1942
- USS Kingfisher (AT-135), ex-AM-25
- USS Oriole (AT-136), ex-AM-7
- USS Owl (AT-137), ex-AM-2
- USS Partridge (AT-138), ex-AM-16
- USS Rail (AT-139), ex-AM-26
- USS Robin (AT-140), ex-AM-3
- USS Seagull (AT-141), ex-AM-30
- USS Tern (AT-142), ex-AM-31
- USS Turkey (AT-143), ex-AM-13
- USS Vireo (AT-144), ex-AM-52
- USS Woodcock (AT-145), ex-AM-14
- USS Lark (AT-168), ex-AM-21
- USS Whippoorwill (AT-169), ex-AM-35

== Auxiliary ocean tugs (ATA, T-ATA) ==
The first ten boats of the Sotoyomo-class were originally classed as Fleet Tugs (AT), as were ATA-146, ATA-166, and ATA-167.

Sotoyomo-class

- USS Sotoyomo (ATA-121)
- USS ATA-122
- USS Iuka (ATA-123)
- USS ATA-124
- USS ATA-125
- USS ATA-126
- USS ATA-127
- USS ATA-128
- USS ATA-170
- USS ATA-171
- USS ATA-172
- USS ATA-173
- USS Wateree (ATA-174)/(USNS Wateree (T-ATA-174))
- USS Sonoma (ATA-175)
- USS Tonkawa (ATA-176)/(USNS Tonkawa (T-ATA-176))
- USS ATA-177
- USS Tunica (ATA-178)
- USS Allegheny (ATA-179)
- USS ATA-180, Operation Crossroads nuclear test participant
- USS Accokeek (ATA-181)
- USS Unadilla (ATA-182)
- USS Nottoway (ATA-183)
- USS Kalmia (ATA-184)
- USS Koka (ATA-185), Operation Crossroads participant
- USS Cahokia (ATA-186)
- USS Salish (ATA-187), Operation Crossroads participant
- USS Penobscot (ATA-188)
- USS Reindeer (ATA-189)
- USS Samoset (ATA-190)
- USS ATA-191
- USS Tillamook (ATA-192), Operation Crossroads participant
- USS Stallion (ATA-193)
- USS Bagaduce (ATA-194)
- USS Tatnuck (ATA-195)
- USS Mahopac (ATA-196)
- USS Sunnadin (ATA-197)
- USS Keosanqua (ATA-198)
- USS Undaunted (ATA-199)
- USS ATA-200
- USS Challenge (ATA-201)
- USS Wampanoag (ATA-202)
- USS Navigator (ATA-203)
- USS Wandank (ATA-204)
- USS Sciota (ATA-205)
- USS Pinola (ATA-206)
- USS Geronimo (ATA-207)
- USS Sagamore (ATA-208)
- USS Umpqua (ATA-209)
- USS Catawba (ATA-210)
- USS Navajo (ATA-211)
- USS Algorma (ATA-212)
- USS Keywadin (ATA-213)

ATA-214-class

- USS ATA-214, ex-YN-94/AN-70
- USS ATA-215, ex-YN-95/AN-71
- USS ATA-216, ex-YN-96/AN-72
- USS ATA-217
- USS ATA-218

Other classes

- USS Maricopa (ATA-146)
- USS Chetco (ATA-166)
- USS Chatot (ATA-167)
- USS ATA-219
- USS ATA-220
- USS ATA-221
- USS ATA-222
- USS ATA-223
- USS ATA-224
- USS ATA-225
- USS ATA-226
- USS ATA-227
- USS ATA-228
- USS ATA-229
- USS ATA-230
- ATA-231 to ATA-233 – Cancelled 1945–1947
- USS ATA-234
- USS ATA-235
- USS ATA-236
- USS ATA-237
- USS ATA-238
- USNS T-ATA-239
- USNS T-ATA-240
- USNS T-ATA-241
- USNS T-ATA-242
- USNS T-ATA-243
- USNS T-ATA-244
- USS Tuscarora (ATA-245)

== Fleet ocean tugs (ATF, T-ATF) ==
All tugs of the Cherokee and Abnaki classes were reclassed from Fleet Tugs (AT) on 15 May 1944.

Cherokee-class

- USS Cherokee (ATF-66)
- USS Apache (ATF-67), Operation Castle nuclear test participant
- USS Arapaho (ATF-68)
- USS Chippewa (ATF-69)
- USS Choctaw (ATF-70)
- USS Hopi (ATF-71)
- USS Kiowa (ATF-72)
- USS Menominee (ATF-73)
- USS Pawnee (ATF-74)
- USS Sioux (ATF-75), nuclear tests participant (Note: USS Sioux participated in Operation Crossroads, Operation Castle, and Operation Dominic)
- USS Ute (ATF-76), Operation Dominic nuclear test participant
- USS Bannock (ATF-81)
- USS Carib (ATF-82)
- USS Chickasaw (ATF-83), nuclear test participant (Note: USS Chickasaw participated in Operation Crossroads and Operation Dominic)
- USS Cree (ATF-84), nuclear tests participant (Note: USS Cree participated in Operation Wigwam and Operation Dominic)
- USS Lipan (ATF-85), nuclear tests participant (Note: USS Lipan participated in Operation Ivy and Operation Dominic)
- USS Mataco (ATF-86)
- USS Moreno (ATF-87)
- USS Narragansett (ATF-88)
- USS Nauset (ATF-89)
- USS Pinto (ATF-90)
- USS Seneca (ATF-91)
- USS Tawasa (ATF-92), Operation Wigwam nuclear test participant
- USS Tekesta (ATF-93)
- USS Yuma (ATF-94), Operation Ivy nuclear test
- USS Zuni (ATF-95)
- USS Chilula (AT-153)

Abnaki-class

- USS Abnaki (ATF-96)
- USS Alsea (ATF-97)
- USS Arikara (ATF-98), nuclear tests participant (Note: USS Arikara participated in Operation Ivy and Operation Dominic)
- USS Chowanoc (ATF-100), Operation Crossroads nuclear test participant
- USS Cocopa (ATF-101), Operation Castle participant
- USS Hidatsa (ATF-102)
- USS Hitchiti (ATF-103), Operation Dominic participant
- USS Jicarilla (ATF-104)
- USS Moctobi (ATF-105), Project SHAD chemical/biological test participant
- USS Molala (ATF-106), nuclear tests participant (Note: USS Molala participated in Operation Castle and Operation Wigwam)
- USS Munsee (ATF-107), nuclear tests participant (Note: USS Munsee participated in Operation Crossroads and Operation Dominic)
- USS Pakana (ATF-108)
- USS Potawatomi (ATF-109)
- USS Quapaw (ATF-110)
- USS Sarsi (ATF-111), sunk by mine between Hungnam and Wonsan, Korea, 27 August 1952, 4 killed
- USS Seranno (ATF-112)
- USS Takelma (ATF-113), Operation Dominic participant
- USS Tawakoni (ATF-114) nuclear tests participant (Note: USS Tawakoni participated in Operation Castle and Operation Dominic)
- USS Tenino (ATF-115)
- USS Tolowa (ATF-116)
- USS Wateree (ATF-117), wrecked by Typhoon Louise Okinawa October 1945, 8 killed
- USS Wenatchee (ATF-118), Operation Crossroads participant
- USS Achomawi (ATF-148), Operation Crossroads participant
- USS Atakapa (ATF-149)
- USS Avoyel (ATF-150)
- USS Chawasha (ATF-151)
- USS Cahuilla (ATF-152)
- USS Chimariko (ATF-154)
- USS Cusabo (ATF-155)
- USS Luiseno (ATF-156)
- USS Nipmuc (ATF-157)
- USS Mosopelea (ATF-158)
- USS Paiute (ATF-159)
- USS Papago (ATF-160)
- USS Salinan (ATF-161)
- USS Shakori (ATF-162)
- USS Utina (ATF-163)
- USS Yurok (ATF-164), later ASR-19
- USS Yustaga (ATF-165), later ASR-20

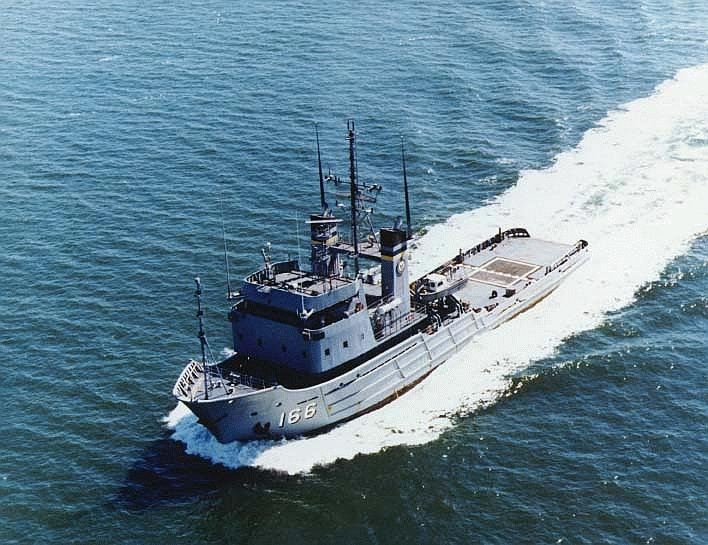
USNS Powhatan (T-ATF-166)

Powhatan-class

- USNS Powhatan (T-ATF-166)
- USNS Narragansett (T-ATF-167)
- USNS Catawba (T-ATF-168) [A]
- USNS Navajo (T-ATF-169) [I]
- USNS Mohawk (T-ATF-170) [I]
- USNS Sioux (T-ATF-171) [I]
- USNS Apache (T-ATF-172) [I]

== Fleet tugs, old (ATO) ==
The Fleet Tug Old classification was created on 15 May 1944, several Fleet Tugs received this classification at this time without a change of hull number.

- USS Allegheny (ATO-19)
- USS Undaunted (ATO-58)
- USS Acushnet (ATO-63)
- USS Esselin (ATO-147)

Sonoma-class

- USS Sonoma (ATO-12), sunk by kamikaze San Pedro Bay, Leyte Gulf, Philippines, 24 October 1944
- USS Ontario (ATO-13)

Bagaduce-class

- USS Sagamore (AT-20)
- USS Bagaduce (ATO-21)
- USS Kalmia (ATO-23)
- USS Kewaydin (ATO-24)
- USS Umpqua (ATO-25)
- USS Wandank (ATO-26)
- USS Tatnuck (ATO-27)
- USS Sunnadin (ATO-28)
- USS Mahopac (ATO-29)
- USS Sciota (ATO-30)
- USS Pinola (ATO-33)
- USS Algorma (ATO-34)
- USS Iuka (ATO-37)
- USS Keosanqua (ATO-38)
- USS Montcalm (ATO-39)

Lapwing-class

- USS Bobolink (ATO-131)
- USS Cormorant (ATO-133)
- USS Kingfisher (ATO-135)
- USS Oriole (ATO-136)
- USS Owl (ATO-137)
- USS Partridge (ATO-138), sunk by torpedo off Normandy, France, 11 June 1944, 5 killed
- USS Rail (ATO-139)
- USS Robin (ATO-140)
- USS Seagull (ATO-141)
- USS Tern (ATO-142)
- USS Turkey (ATO-143)
- USS Vireo (ATO-144)
- USS Woodcock (ATO-145)
- USS Lark (ATO-168)
- USS Whippoorwill (ATO-169)

== Rescue tugs (ATR) ==
ATR-1 class

- USS ATR-1
- USS ATR-2
- USS ATR-3
- USS ATR-4
- USS ATR-5
- USS ATR-6
- USS ATR-7
- USS ATR-8
- USS ATR-9
- USS ATR-10
- USS ATR-11
- USS ATR-12
- USS ATR-13
- USS ATR-14
- USS ATR-15
- USS ATR-16
- USS ATR-17
- USS ATR-18
- USS ATR-19
- USS ATR-20
- USS ATR-21
- USS ATR-22
- USS ATR-23
- USS ATR-24
- USS ATR-25
- USS ATR-26
- USS ATR-27
- USS ATR-28
- USS ATR-29
- USS ATR-30
- USS ATR-31
- USS ATR-32
- USS ATR-33
- USS ATR-34
- USS ATR-35
- USS ATR-36
- USS ATR-37
- USS ATR-38
- USS ATR-39
- USS ATR-40, Operation Crossroads nuclear test participant
- USS ATR-41
- USS ATR-42

Sotoyomo-class

- USS ATR-43
- USS ATR-44
- USS ATR-45
- USS ATR-46
- USS ATR-47
- USS ATR-51
- USS ATR-52
- USS ATR-53
- USS ATR-54
- USS ATR-55
- USS ATR-56
- USS ATR-57
- USS ATR-58
- USS ATR-59
- USS ATR-60
- USS ATR-61
- USS ATR-62
- USS ATR-63
- USS ATR-64
- USS ATR-65
- USS ATR-66
- USS ATR-67
- USS ATR-68
- USS ATR-69
- USS ATR-70
- USS ATR-71
- USS ATR-72
- USS ATR-73
- USS ATR-74
- USS ATR-75
- USS ATR-76
- USS ATR-77
- USS ATR-78
- USS ATR-79
- USS ATR-80
- USS ATR-81
- USS ATR-82
- USS ATR-83
- USS ATR-84
- USS ATR-85
- USS ATR-86
- USS ATR-87, Operation Crossroads participant
- USS ATR-88
- USS ATR-89
- USS ATR-90
- USS ATR-91
- USS ATR-92
- USS ATR-93
- USS ATR-94
- USS ATR-95
- USS ATR-96
- USS ATR-97
- USS ATR-98
- USS ATR-99
- USS ATR-100
- USS ATR-101
- USS ATR-102
- USS ATR-103
- USS ATR-104
- USS ATR-105
- USS ATR-106
- USS ATR-107
- USS ATR-108
- USS ATR-109
- USS ATR-110
- USS ATR-111
- USS ATR-112
- USS ATR-113
- USS ATR-114
- USS ATR-115
- USS ATR-116
- USS ATR-117
- USS ATR-118
- USS ATR-119
- USS ATR-120
- USS ATR-121
- USS ATR-122
- USS ATR-123
- USS ATR-124
- USS ATR-125
- USS ATR-126
- USS ATR-127
- USS ATR-128
- USS ATR-129
- USS ATR-130
- USS ATR-131
- USS ATR-132
- USS ATR-133
- USS ATR-134
- USS ATR-135
- USS ATR-136
- USS ATR-137
- USS ATR-138
- USS ATR-139
- USS ATR-140

== Salvage and rescue ships (ATS) ==
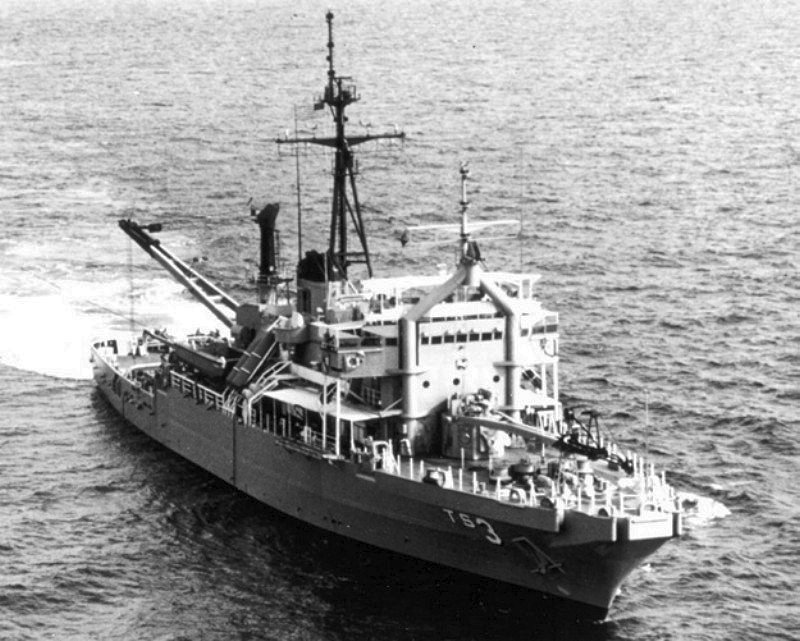
USS Brunswick (ATS-3)

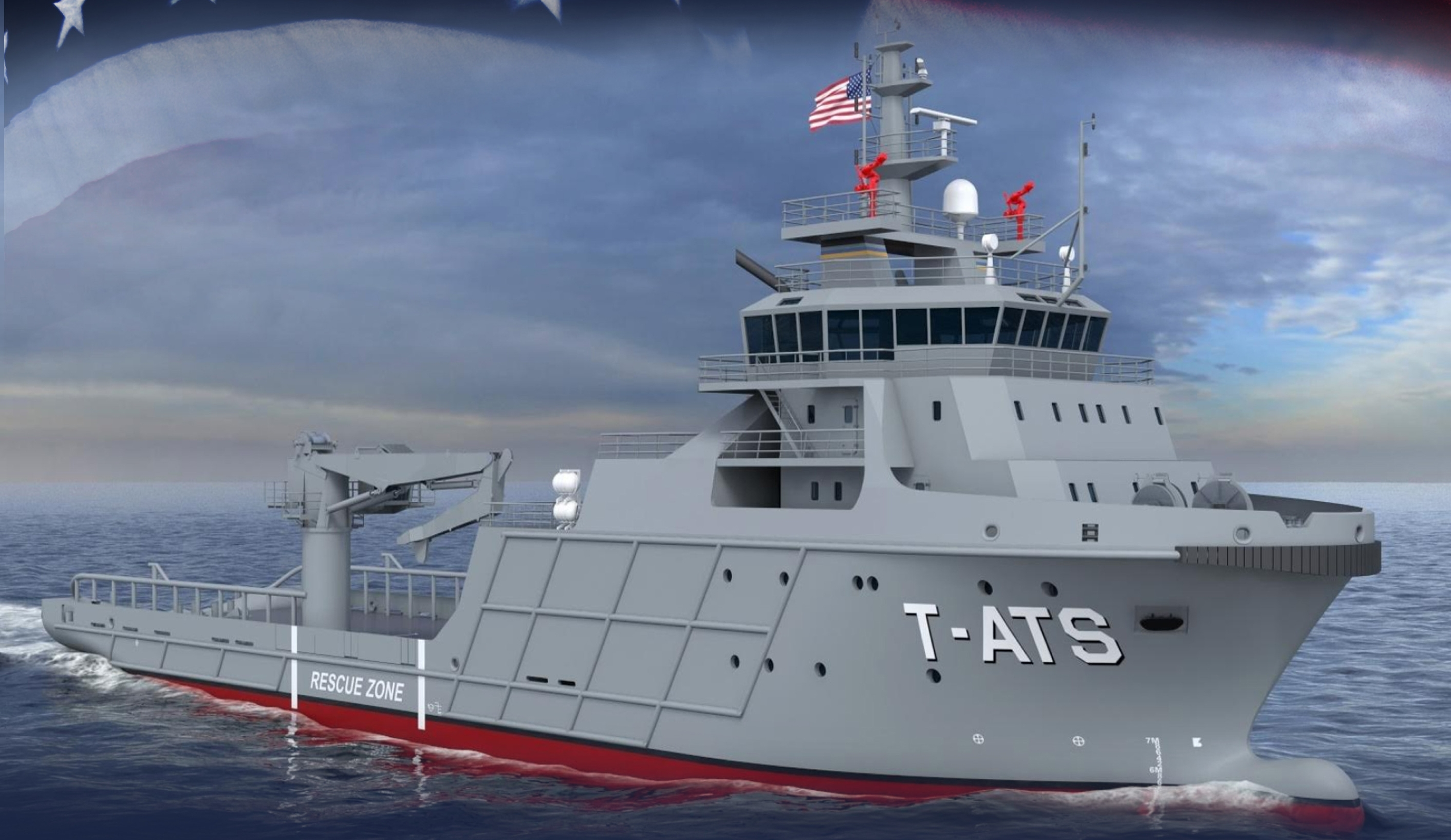
Graphic representation of a Navajo-class towing, salvage and rescue ship

Edenton-class

- USS Edenton (ATS-1), later USCGC Alex Haley (WMEC-39).
- USS Beaufort (ATS-2)
- USS Brunswick (ATS-3)

ATS-4 and ATS-5 skipped

Navajo-class

- USNS Navajo (T-ATS-6) [P]
- USNS Cherokee Nation (T-ATS-7) [P]
- USNS Saginaw Ojibwe Anishinabek (T-ATS-8) [P]
- USNS Lenni Lenape (T-ATS-7) [P]
- USNS Muscogee Creek Nation (T-ATS-10) [P]
- USNS Billy Frank Jr. (T-ATS-11) [P]
- USNS Solomon Atkinson (T-ATS-12) [P]
- USNS James D. Fairbanks (T-ATS-13) [P]
- USNS Narragansett (T-ATS-14) [P]
- (T-ATS-15) [P]

== Seaplane tenders (AV) ==
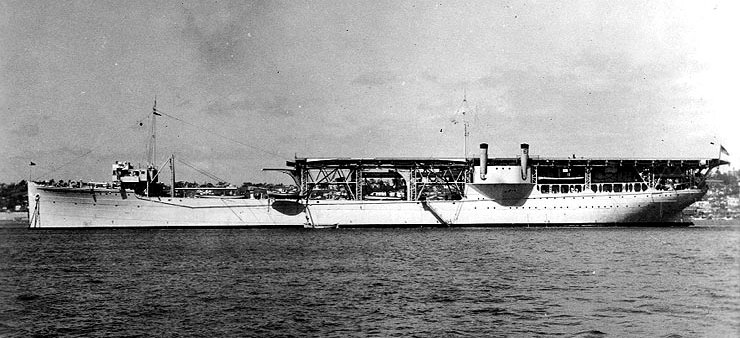
USS Langley (AV-3)

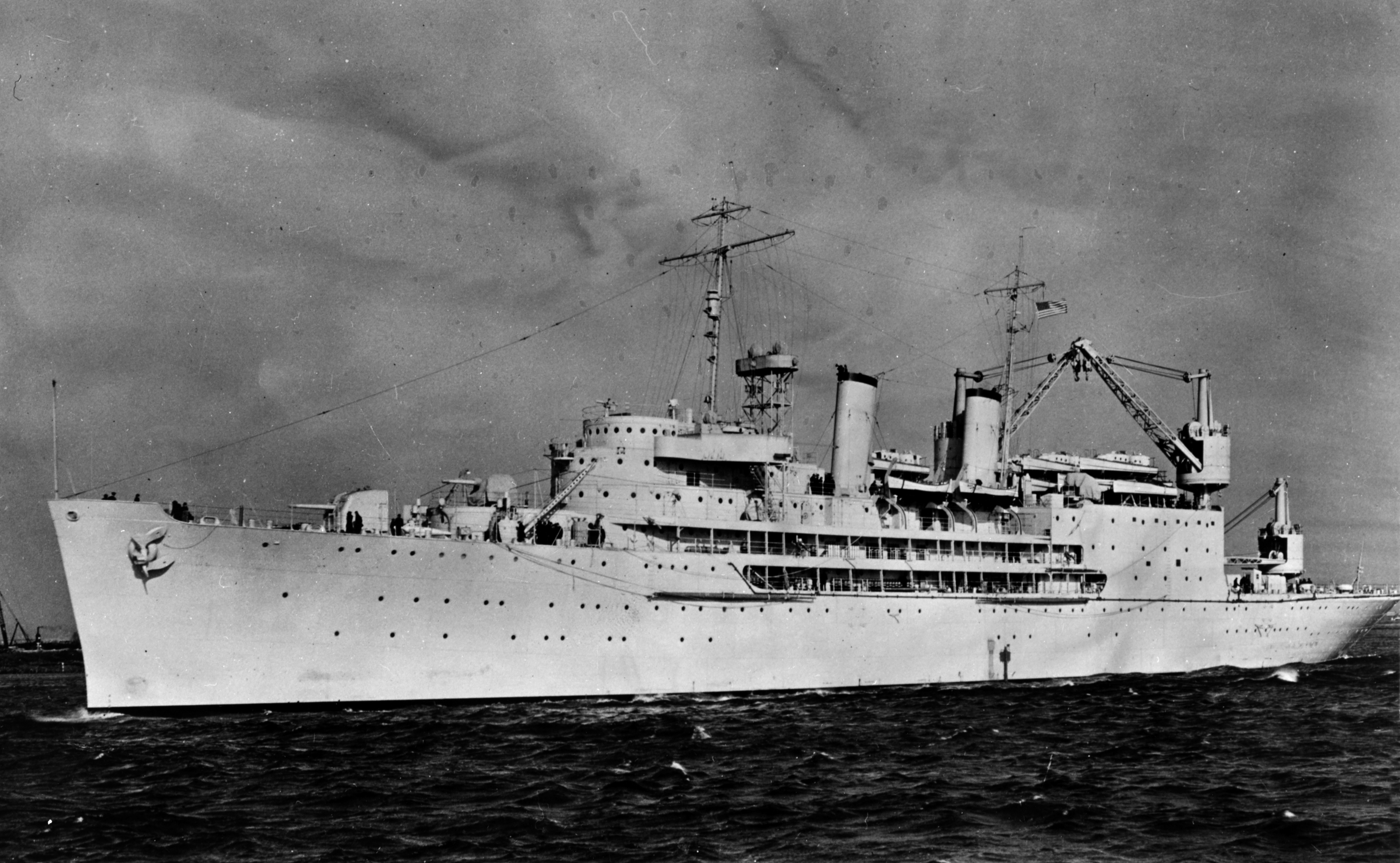
USS Curtiss (AV-4)

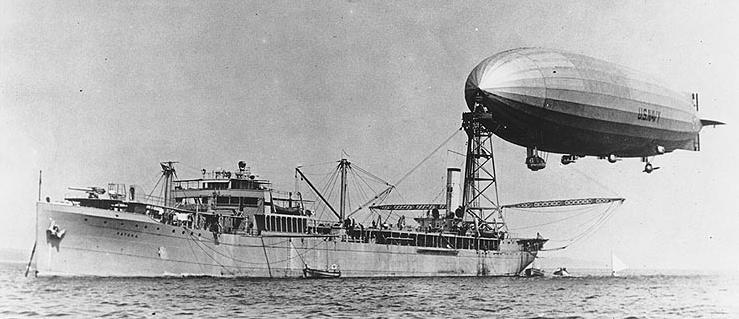
USS Patoka (AV-6) as (AO-9)

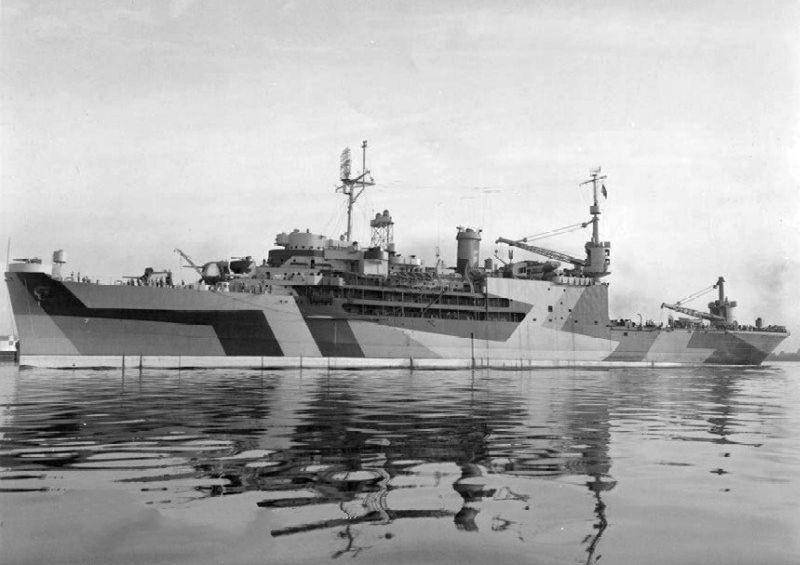
USS Currituck (AV-7)

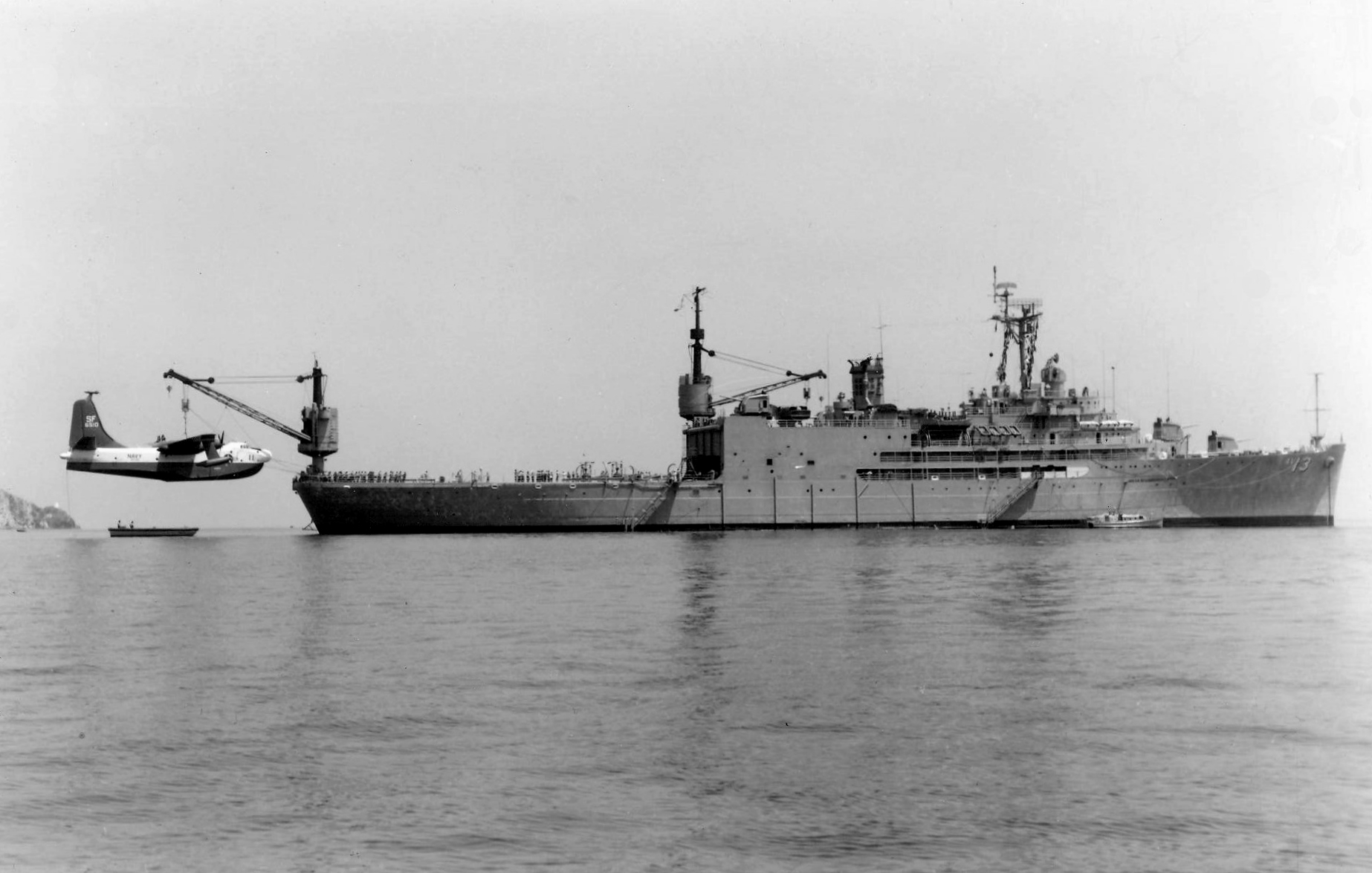
USS Salisbury Sound (AV-13)

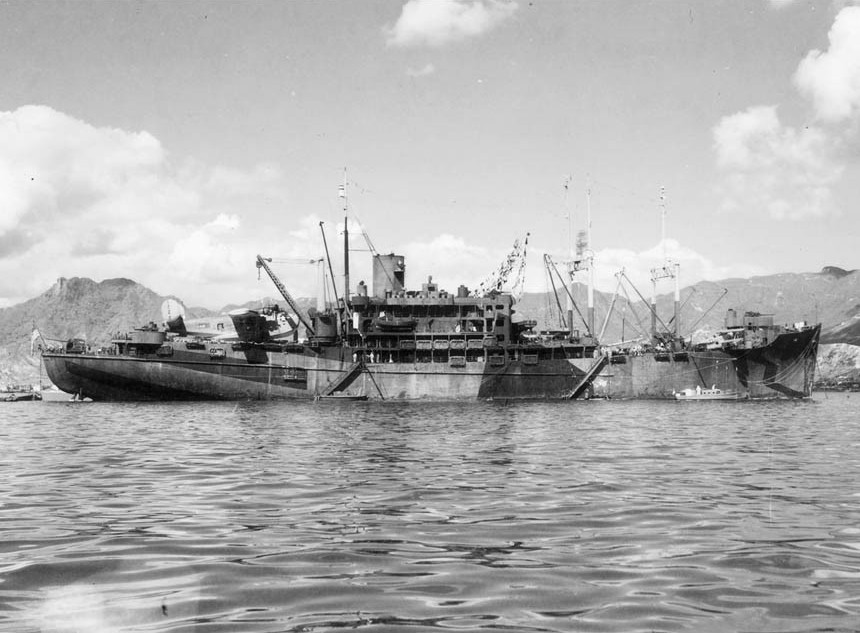
USS Kenneth Whiting (AV-14)

Ships which have functioned as seaplane tenders without the AV designation include the USS Mississippi (BB-23) in 1914, the USS Ajax (AG-15) in 1924–1925, and the USS Christiana (IX-80 / YAG-32) in WW2.

Wright-class

- USS Wright (AV-1), ex-AZ-1, later AG-79

Jason-class

- USS Jason (AV-2), ex-AC-12

Langley-class

- USS Langley (AV-3), ex-AC-3, CV-1, scuttled Java Sea 27 February 1942 after air attack, 16 killed outright, possibly hundreds killed after rescue ship sunk

Curtiss-class

- USS Curtiss (AV-4), nuclear tests participant (Note: USS Curtiss participated in Operation Sandstone, Operation Greenhouse, Operation Ivy, Operation Wigwam, and Operation Redwing)
- USS Albemarle (AV-5), nuclear tests participant, (Note: USS Albemarle participated in Operation Crossroads and Operation Sandstone) later T-ARVH-1 as Corpus Christi Bay

Patoka-class

- USS Patoka (AV-6), ex-AO–9, later AG–125

Currituck class

- USS Currituck (AV-7)
- USS Norton Sound (AV-11), later AVM-1
- USS Pine Island (AV-12)
- USS Salisbury Sound (AV-13)

Tangier-class: MC type C3

- USS Tangier (AV-8)

Pocomoke-class: MC type C3

- USS Pocomoke (AV-9)

Chandeleur-class: MC type C3

- USS Chandeleur (AV-10)

Kenneth Whiting-class: MC type C3

- USS Kenneth Whiting (AV-14), Operation Crossroads participant
- USS Hamlin (AV-15)
- USS St George (AV-16)
- USS Cumberland Sound (AV-17), Operation Crossroads participant
- USS Townsend (AV-18), cancelled while under construction 1945
- USS Calibogue (AV-19), canceled while under construction 1944
- USS Hobe Sound (AV-20), canceled while under construction 1944

Ashland-class

- USS Ashland (AV-21), conversion from LSD-1 canceled 1959

unknown class

- (AV-22), conversion from unassigned ship canceled
- (AV-23), conversion from unassigned ship canceled

== Advance aviation base ships (AVB, T-AVB) ==
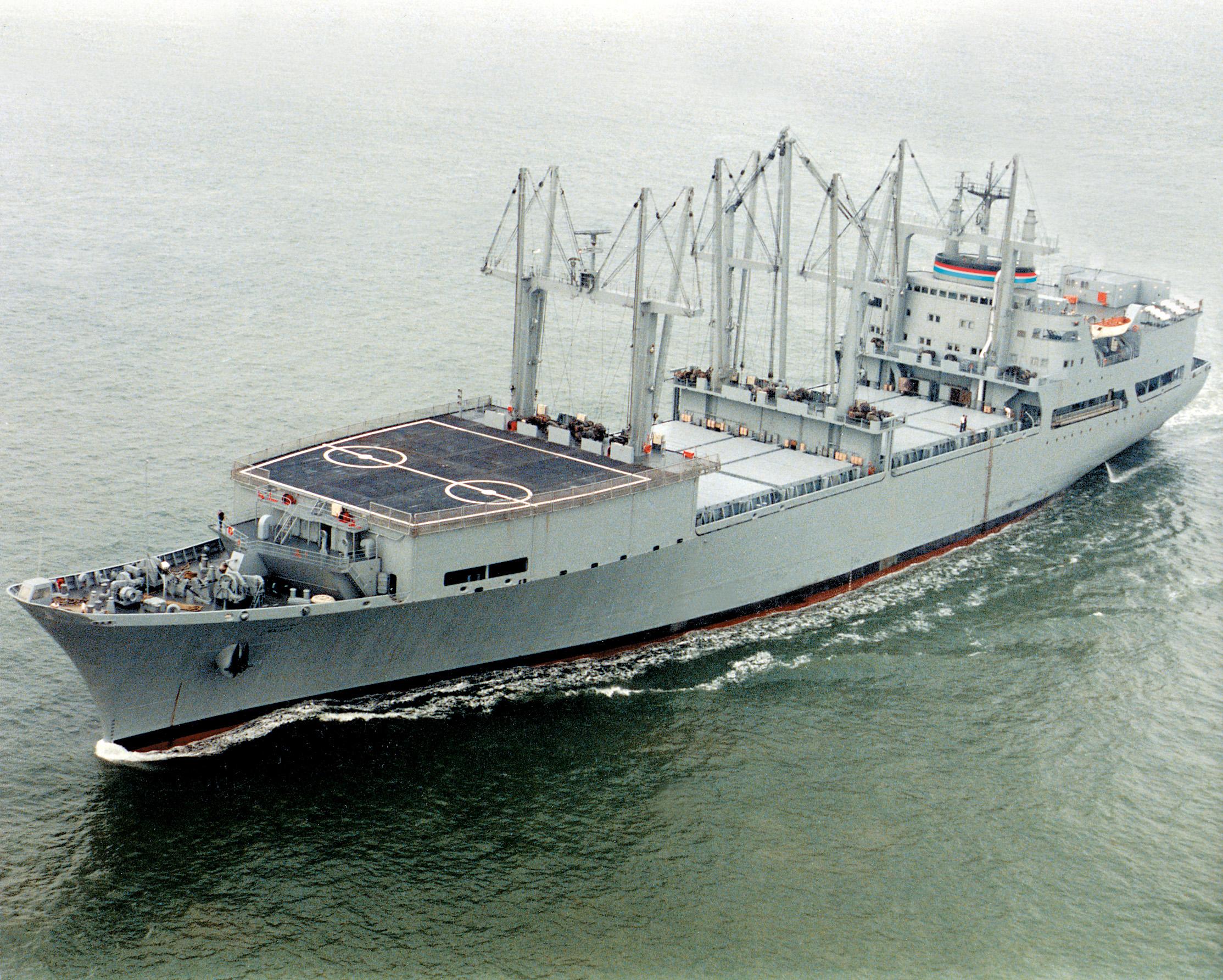
SS Wright (T-AVB-3)

- USS Alameda County (AVB-1), ex-LST-32
- USS Tallahatchie County (AVB-2), ex-LST-1154

Wright-class: MA type C5-S-78

- SS Wright (T-AVB-3) [R]
- USNS Curtiss (T-AVB-4) [R]

== Seaplane catapult, light (AVC) ==
- AVC-1

== Destroyer seaplane tenders (AVD) ==
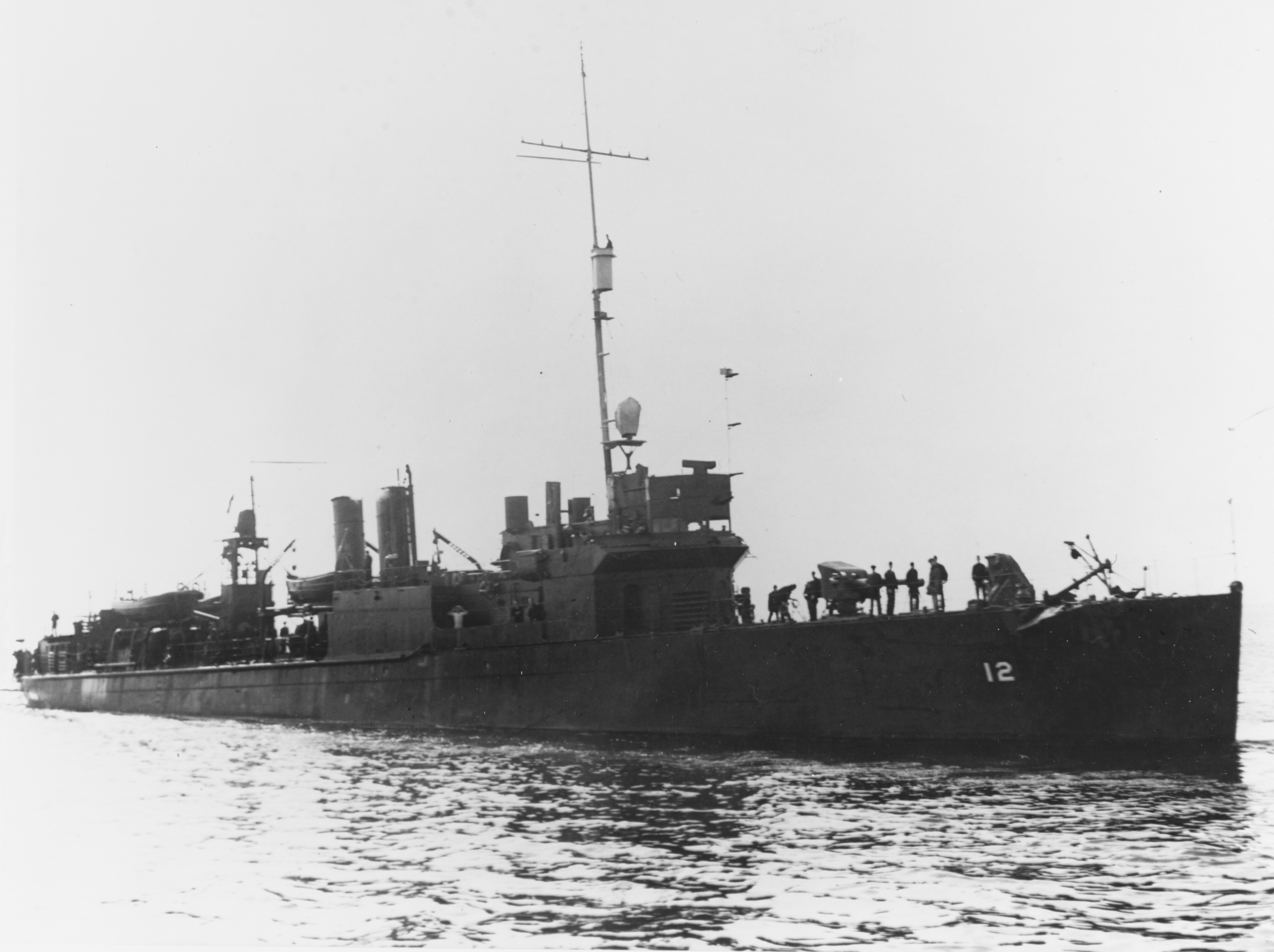
USS Gillis (AVD-12)

Clemson class

These ships were formerly Destroyers (DD), some of which had been converted to Small seaplane tenders (AVP) and then reclassified as AVD. Seven would later be converted to High-speed transports (APD).

- USS Childs (AVD-1), former AVP-14
- USS Williamson (AVD-2), former AVP-15, later APD-27
- USS George E. Badger (AVD-3), former AVP-16, later APD-33
- USS Clemson (AVD-4), former AVP-17, later APD-31
- USS Goldsborough (AVD-5), former AVP-18, later APD-32
- USS Hulbert (AVD-6), former AVP-19
- USS William B. Preston (AVD-7), former AVP-20
- USS Belknap (AVD-8), former DD-251, later APD-34
- USS Osmond Ingram (AVD-9), former DD-255, later APD-35
- USS Ballard (AVD-10), former DD-267
- USS Thornton (AVD-11), former DD-270
- USS Gillis (AVD-12), former DD-260
- USS Greene (AVD-13), former DD-266, later APD-36
- USS McFarland (AVD-14), former DD-237

== Auxiliary aircraft escort vessels (AVG) ==
The Auxiliary aircraft escort vessels (AVG) were redesignated Auxiliary aircraft carriers (ACV) on 20 August 1942 and then Escort aircraft carriers (CVE) on 15 July 1943.

== Guided missile ships (AVM) ==
- USS Norton Sound (AVM-1), ex-AV-11, nuclear tests participant (Note: USS Norton Sound participated in Operation Argus and Operation Dominic)

== Small seaplane tenders (AVP) ==
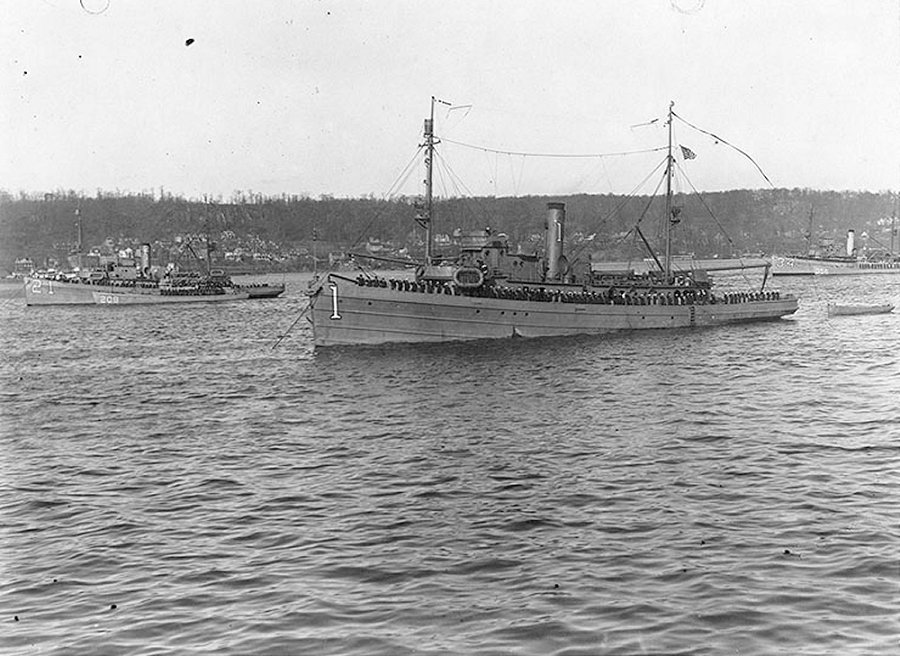
USS Lapwing (AVP-1) as (AM-1)

Lapwing-class

- USS Lapwing (AVP-1), former AM-1
- USS Heron (AVP-2), former AM-10
- USS Thrush (AVP-3), former AM-18
- USS Avocet (AVP-4), former AM-19
- USS Teal (AVP-5), former AM-23
- USS Pelican (AVP-6), former AM-27
- USS Swan (AVP-7), former AM-34
- USS Gannet (AVP-8), former AM-41, torpedoed 7 June 1942, 16 killed
- USS Sandpiper (AVP-9), former AM-51

Clemson-class

The Clemson-class of Small seaplane tenders (AVP) were reclassified as Destroyer seaplane tenders (AVD) in 1940; they were originally Destroyers (DD).

- USS Childs (AVP-14), former DD-241, later AVD-1
- USS Williamson (AVP-15), former DD-244, later AVD-2
- USS George E. Badger (AVP-16), former DD-196, CG-16 (USCG), later AVD-3
- USS Clemson (AVP-17), former DD-186, later AVD-4
- USS Goldsborough (AVP-18), former DD-188, later AVD-5
- USS Hulbert (AVP-19), former DD-342, later AVD-6
- USS William B. Preston (AVP-20), former DD-344, later AVD-7

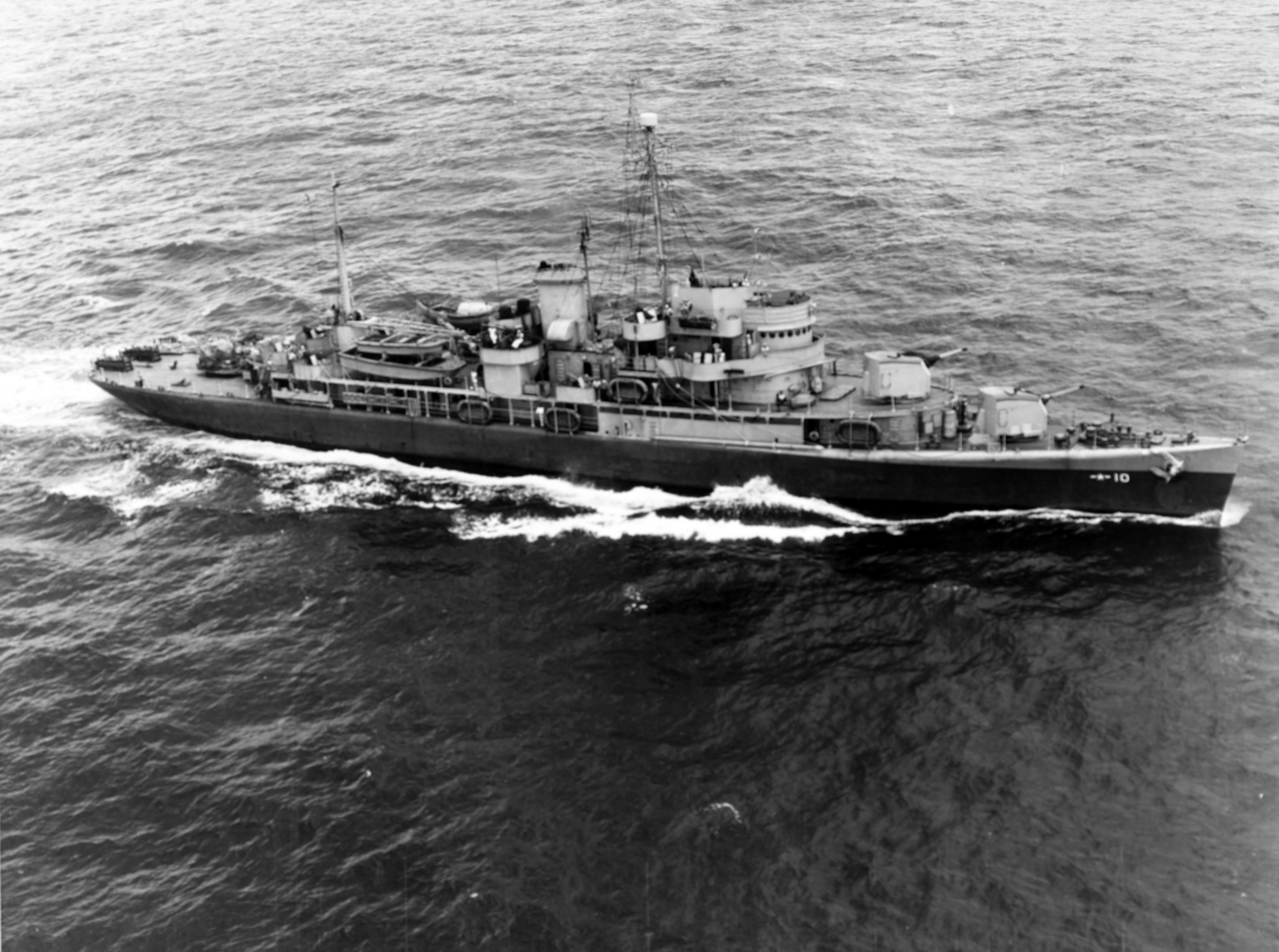
USS Barnegat (AVP-10)

Barnegat-class

The Barnegat class ships were the first purpose-built AVPs.

- USS Barnegat (AVP-10)
- USS Biscayne (AVP-11), later AGC-18
- USS Casco (AVP-12)
- USS Mackinac (AVP-13)
- USS Hunboldt (AVP-21), briefly AG-121
- USS Matagorda (AVP-22), briefly AG-122
- USS Abescon (AVP-23)
- USS Chincoteague (AVP-24)
- USS Coos Bay (AVP-25)
- USS Half Moon (AVP-26)
- USS Mobjack (AVP-27), later AGP-7
- USS Oyster Bay (AVP-28), briefly AGP-6
- USS Rockaway (AVP-29), briefly AG-123
- USS San Pablo (AVP-30), later AGS-30
- USS Unimak (AVP-31)
- USS Yakutat (AVP-32)
- USS Barataria (AVP-33)
- USS Bering Strait (AVP-34)
- USS Castle Rock (AVP-35)
- USS Cook Inlet (AVP-36)
- USS Corson (AVP-37)
- USS Duxbury Bay (AVP-38)
- USS Gardiners Bay (AVP-39), Operation Sandstone participant
- USS Floyds Bay (AVP-40)
- USS Greenwich Bay (AVP-41)
- USS Hatteras (AVP-42), canceled
- USS Hempstead (AVP-43), canceled
- USS Kamishak (AVP-44), canceled
- USS Magothy (AVP-45), canceled
- USS Matanzas (AVP-46), canceled
- USS Metomkin (AVP-47), canceled
- USS Onslow (AVP-48)
- USS Orca (AVP-49), Operation Crossroads participant
- USS Rehoboth (AVP-50), later AGS-50
- USS San Carlos (AVP-51), later T-AGOR-1
- USS Shelikof (AVP-52)
- USS Suisin (AVP-53)
- USS Timbalier (AVP-54)
- USS Valcour (AVP-55), later AGF-1
- USS Wachapreague (AVP-56), later AGP-8
- USS Willoughby (AVP-57), later AGP-9

== Aviation stores issue ships (AVS) ==
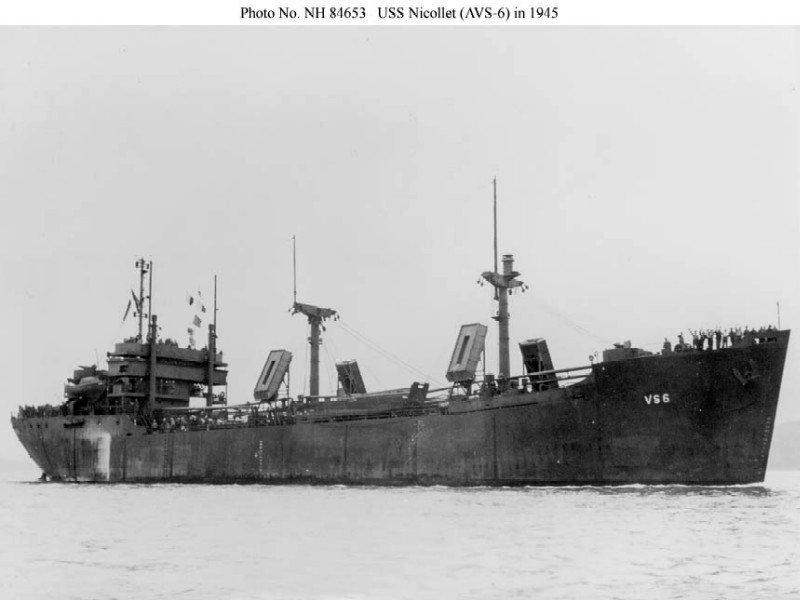
USS Nicollet (AVS-6)

- USS Supply (AVS-1), ex-IX-147
- USS Fortune (AVS-2), ex-IX-146

Grumium-class: MC type EC2-S-C1

- USS Grumium (AVS-3), ex-AK-112, ex-IX-174
- USS Allioth (AVS-4), ex-AK-109, ex-IX-204

Gwinnett-class: MC type C1-M-AV1

- USS Gwinnett (AVS-5), ex-AK-185, ex-AG-92
- USS Nicollet (AVS-6), ex-AK-199, ex-AG-93
- USS Pontotoc (AVS-7), ex-AK-206, ex-AG-94

Other

- USS Jupiter (AVS-8), ex-AK-43

== Aircraft transports (AVT) ==
All of these aircraft carriers received this classification while in reserve in 1959, 1960, and 1961, and none ever operated as Aircraft Transports after receiving it.

Independence class

- USS Cowpens (AVT-1), ex-CVL-25
- USS Monterey (AVT-2), ex-CVL-26
- USS Cabot (AVT-3), ex-CVL-28, to Spain as Dédalo 1967
- USS Bataan (AVT-4), ex-CVL-29
- USS San Jacinto (AVT-5), ex-CVL-30

Saipan class

- USS Saipan (AVT-6), ex-CVL-48, later CC-3, then AGMR-2 as Arlington
- USS Wright (AVT-7), ex-CVL-49, later CC-2

Essex class

- USS Franklin (AVT-8), ex-CV-13
- USS Bunker Hill (AVT-9), ex-CV-17
- USS Leyte (AVT-10), ex-CV-32
- USS Philippine Sea (AVT-11), ex-CV-47
- USS Tarawa (AVT-12), ex-CV-40

== Auxiliary aircraft landing training ships (AVT) ==
- USS Lexington (AVT-16), ex CVT-16
- USS Forrestal (AVT-59), ex CVA-59

== Distilling ships (AW) ==
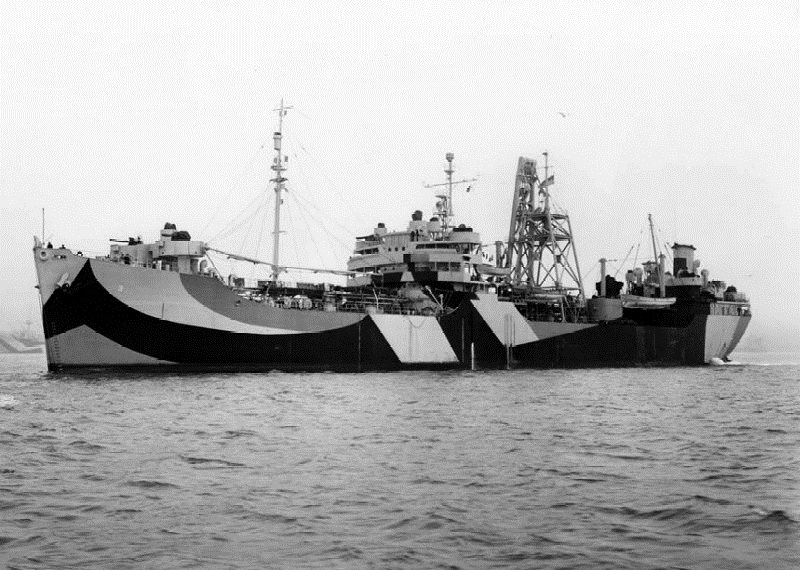
USS Pasig (AW-3)

Stag-class: MC type Z-ET1-S-C3

- USS Stag (AW-1), ex-IX-128
- USS Wildcat (AW-2), ex-IX-130, Operation Crossroads nuclear test participant

Pasig-class: MC type T2-SE-A2

- USS Pasig (AW-3), ex-AO–91, Operation Sandstone nuclear test participant
- USS Abatan (AW-4), ex-AO–92

== Lighter-than-air aircraft tender (AZ) ==
- USS Wright (AZ-1), later AV-1
- USS Patoka (AO-9) operated as a lighter-than-air aircraft tender from 1924 to 1933, but never received the AZ classification

== Pre-1920 craft ==
=== Screw tugs ===
- USS Alert

=== World War I (ID) series ===
Civilian cargo ships, tankers, transports, etc., were registered during World War I for potential use and given "ID" identification numbers in the "ID/SP" numbering series.

== See also ==
- Auxiliary cruiser (which is, despite its name, a type of warship (cruiser), not an auxiliary)
- Glossary of watercraft types in service of the United States
- List of current ships of the United States Navy
- List of United States Navy ships
- List of United States Navy losses in World War II § Auxiliaries - abbreviated list
- List of U.S. Navy ships sunk or damaged in action during World War II § Auxiliaries - detailed list
- List of United States Naval Air Stations, including auxiliary airfields
- Military Auxiliary Radio System, Navy-Marine Corp branch operated 1962–2015
- Military Sealift Command, current operator of most US Navy auxiliaries
- Strategic sealift ships
- United States Coast Guard Auxiliary (an auxiliary organization of support personnel, not a type of ship)
