= 217 (disambiguation) =

217 may also refer to:

- 217
- 217 (number)
- 217 BC/BCE; a year (ISO year -216; Holocene calendar year 9784; 2166 BP)

== Places ==
- 217 Eudora, a main-belt asteroid, the 217th asteroid registered
- 217P/LINEAR, a comet, the 217th periodic comet registered
- Rural Municipality of Lipton No. 217 (RM 217), Saskatchewan, Canada
- Area code 217, telephone area code for Central Illinois, United States
- 217th Street (Manhattan), New York City, New York, United States
- Route 217, see List of highways numbered 217
- Old Fort 217 (Indian reserve), Wood Buffalo, Alberta, Canada; of the Mikisew Cree First Nation
- Morin Lake 217 (Indian reserve), la Ronge Lake, Saskatchewan, Canada; of the Lac La Ronge Indian Band
- Constituency PP-217 (Khanewal-VI), Punjab, India; a provincial constituency
- NA-217 (Sanghar-III), Pakistan; a national constituency

== Military ==
=== Military unit numbered 217 ===
- Unit 217 (Hebrew: דובדבן, romanized: Duvdevan, lit. 'cherry') Israeli counter-terrorism unit
- No. 217 Squadron RAF, UK Royal Air Force
- No. 217 Maintenance Unit RAF, UK Royal Air Force
- 217th (1st London) Army Field Company, Royal Engineers, UK
- 217th Infantry Division (Wehrmacht), Nazi Germany
- 217th Division (People's Republic of China)
- 217th Guards Airborne Regiment of the USSR and then Russia

=== Naval ship with pennant number 217 ===
- USS ATA-217, a U.S. Navy WWII tugboat
- USS Delegate (AM-217), a U.S. Navy WWII Admirable-class minesweeper
- USS Whipple (DD-217), a U.S. Navy interwar Clemson-class destroyer
- USS Coolbaugh (DE-217), a U.S. Navy WWII Buckley-class destroyer escort (frigate)
- HMAS Bunbury (FCPB 217), a Royal Australian Navy 1970s Fremantle-class patrol boat
- USS Tackle (IX-217), a U.S. Navy WWII rescue and salvage ship
- HMS Loyalty (J217), a UK Royal Navy WWII Algerine-class minesweeper
- HMS Swale (K217), a UK Royal Navy WWII River-class frigate
- USS LSM-217, U.S. Navy WWII landing ship
- HMS Sibyl (P217), a UK Royal Navy WWII S-class submarine
- USS Guardfish (SS-217), U.S. Navy WWII Gato-class submarine
- German submarine U-217, a Nazi Germany WWII Type VIID submarine
- USCGC Hemlock (WAGL-217), a U.S. Coast Guard 1930s lighthouse tender

== Nuclear chemistry ==
- Biunseptium (Bus), element 217; a theoretical nuclear chemical element with 217 protons; see extended periodic table

=== Isotope 217 ===
Nuclear chemical isotopes with a total of 217 protons and neutrons:

- Astatine-217
- Bismuth-217
- Polonium-217
- Protactinium-217
- Radium-217
- Radon-217
- Thorium-217
- Uranium-217

== Other uses ==
- Flight 217 (disambiguation)

== See also ==
- 21700 (disambiguation)
- 2170 (disambiguation)
