= C217 =

C217 may refer to:

- Mercedes-Benz S-Class (C217)
- C217, Tasmania, Australia; see List of road routes in Tasmania
- Victoria Valley Road (C217), Victoria, Australia; see List of road routes in Victoria
- C217, a vehicle used by Pennsylvania mass transit provider CamTran

== See also ==
- 217 (disambiguation)
- C (disambiguation)
