= 2170 =

2170 may refer to:

- 2170 (number), a number in the 2000-3000 range
- 2170 CE/AD, a year (12170 on the Holocene calendar; 120 AP); and its associated decade (2170s)
- 2170 BC/BCE, a year (7931 on the Holocene calendar; -2169 on the ISO calendar; 3219 BP); and its associated decade (2170s B.C./BCE)
- 2170 battery (a.k.a. 21700), a size form factor of cylindrical lithium-ion rechargeable battery cells
- 2170 Byelorussia (asteroid #2170), an asteroid named Byelorussia, the 2170th asteroid registered
- Queensland Railways 2170 class, a class of diesel-electric locomotive operated by Queensland Railways
- U+2170x (Unicode character block), see List of CJK Unified Ideographs Extension B (Part 2 of 7)
- U+2170 (Unicode character), see List of Latin letters by shape
- hex 2170 (JIS character), see List of Japanese typographic symbols

== See also ==
- Category:Fiction set in the 2170s
- USS Relief (ID-2170), a U.S. Navy salvage tug
- Farm to Market Road 2170 (FM-2170), a road in Texas, USA
- LTE frequency band 1 (Long Term Evolution / 4G) downlink frequencies 2110–2170MHz
- S-DMB (S-Band Digital Media Broadcasting) using 2170–2200 MHz
- UNSC Resolution 2170, a 2014 UN Security Council resolution for international military intervention against ISIL
- The Thing Happens: A.D. 2170 (stageplay), a 1910s play written by George Bernard Shaw
- 21700 (disambiguation)
- 217 (disambiguation)
- 217 (number)
- 217 (ISO year +217; A.D. 217 / 217 CE)
