= USS ATA-216 =

Tugboat of the United States Navy

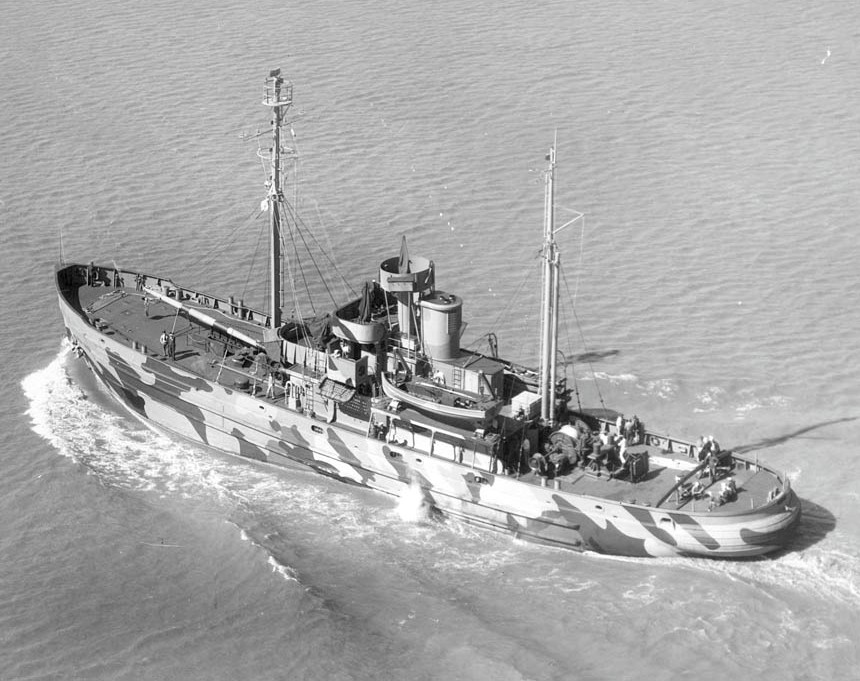
- ATA-216 underway

History

United States
- Name: USS Allthorn
- Namesake: Allthorn
- Builder: Canulette Shipbuilding Co., Slidell, Louisiana
- Laid down: 31 October 1943 as Allthorn (YN-94)
- Launched: 25 May 1944
- Commissioned: date unknown, as USS ATA-216
- Decommissioned: date unknown
- Reclassified: AN-70, 20 January 1944; ATA-216, 15 May 1944
- Stricken: date unknown
- Fate: Scrapped 1968

General characteristics
- Type: ATA-214-class auxiliary fleet tug
- Displacement: 1,275 tons
- Length: 194 ft 6 in (59.28 m)
- Beam: 34 ft 7 in (10.54 m)
- Draft: 14 ft 1 in (4.29 m) (full load)
- Propulsion: diesel-electric engines, single screw
- Speed: 12.1 knots
- Complement: 57 officers and enlisted
- Armament: two 40 mm gun mounts

USS ATA-216 was an ATA-214-class tug of the United States Navy built in 1944. Originally laid down as the net tender Allthorn of the Ailanthus class, she was redesignated before being launched. The ship was commissioned on 30 October 1944. ATA-216 had a brief naval career, and was decommissioned on 26 March 1946.

== Construction ==
Originally planned as the Ailanthus-class net laying ship Allthorn (YN-94), she was laid down on 31 October 1943 at Slidell, Louisiana by the Canulette Shipbuilding Company. On 20 January 1944 she was redesignated as an auxiliary net laying ship, Allthorn (AN-70), and launched on 27 May. On 12 August her name was cancelled, she was again repurposed, to the ATA-214-class auxiliary ocean tug ATA-216, and commissioned as such on 30 October 1944.

== Naval service ==
ATA-216 served in the Pacific Theater and, after the surrender of Japan, briefly in the Occupation Service in the Far East, until 20 October 1945. The tug was decommissioned on 26 March 1946 and later struck from the Navy List.

== Commercial service ==
In 1948 the tug was sold to unidentified American interests and renamed Kara Gay, and then registered in 1951 to Walter H Wilms & Company of Portland, Oregon, allocated Official Number 262382, and renamed El Sol. After three years she was bought by the Portland Tug & Barge Company, and then resold in 1956 to the New York City-based De Long Corporation, which registered her in Panama, still with the same name, El Sol.
