= ATA-214-class tug =

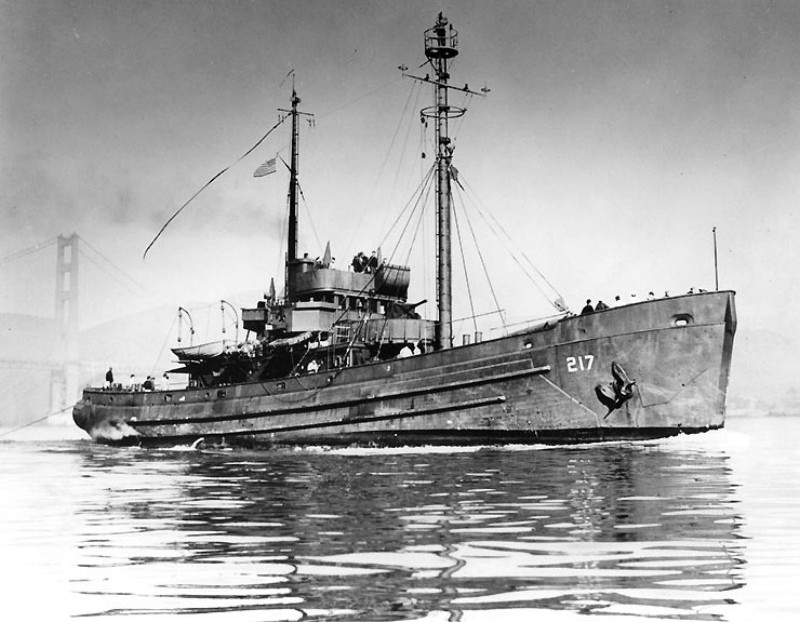
- ATA-217 at war's end

Class overview
- Name: ATA-214 class
- Builders: Snow Shipyards, Rockland, Maine (2); Canuelette Shipbuilding Co., Slidell, Louisiana (3)
- Operators: United States Navy
- Built: 1943–1944
- In commission: 1944–1946
- Completed: 5

General characteristics
- Type: Auxiliary Fleet Tug
- Displacement: 1,550 long tons (1,575 t)
- Length: 194.5 ft (59.3 m)
- Beam: 34.6 ft (10.5 m)
- Draft: 14.1 ft (4.3 m)
- Propulsion: Diesel-electric engines, 1 shaft, 1,500 hp (1,119 kW)
- Speed: 12.1 knots (22.4 km/h; 13.9 mph)
- Complement: 57
- Armament: various; see text

The ATA-214 class was a group of five auxiliary tugs built for the United States Navy in World War II and decommissioned shortly thereafter. They were laid down initially as Ailanthus-class net laying ships, but on 10 July 1944 the last ten ships of the latter class were cancelled. On 5 August 1944 the cancellation was rescinded for those on which construction had commenced (these five), and they were directed to be completed as tugs. The originally assigned names were dropped, and they were identified only by hull numbers ATA-214 through ATA-218. However, for reasons unexplained, ATA-218 was commissioned as USS Yaupon.

Some changes were made as construction progressed. After the first two were completed (ATA-214 and ATA-216) the mainmast was moved forward to rest directly behind the funnel, and the boom on this mast was eliminated as unnecessary. Armament varied as well, based upon experiences with the Ailanthus class vessels already built. The first two completed had a single 3" gun mounted on a platform ahead of the bridge, and three 20mm antiaircraft guns mounted in two tiers in front of the funnel. It was found that the upper of these three was too close to the funnel, and for the next two (ATA-215 and ATA-217) this mount was relocated immediately behind the mainmast. For the last ship (ATA-218) the 3" gun was eliminated (though its platform remained) and two 40mm AA guns were mounted on the forecastle.

All five served in the Pacific theater, and ATA-215, ATA-216, and ATA-218 also participated in the occupation of Japan in various periods from September to November 1945. ATA-215 was loaned to the Ronne Antarctic Research Expedition and sold upon its return; the others were sold through the Maritime Commission.

== Ships ==
Hull number	Commissioned	Decommissioned	Fate
ATA-214	25 September 1944	September 1945	Sold to a commercial interest, 30 April 1947; sunk, 9 September 1953
ATA-215	17 December 1944	20 June 1946	Sold to a commercial interest, 8 February 1949; sunk, 15 April 1963
ATA-216	30 October 1944	26 March 1946	Sold to a commercial interest, 1948; sold for scrap, 1969
ATA-217	16 January 1945	7 May 1946	Sold to a commercial interest, 25 March 1947; sunk, 17 February 1949
USS Yaupon (ATA-218)	10 March 1945	26 March 1946	Sold for scrap, 3 January 1947
