= USS ATA-214 =

Tugboat of the United States Navy

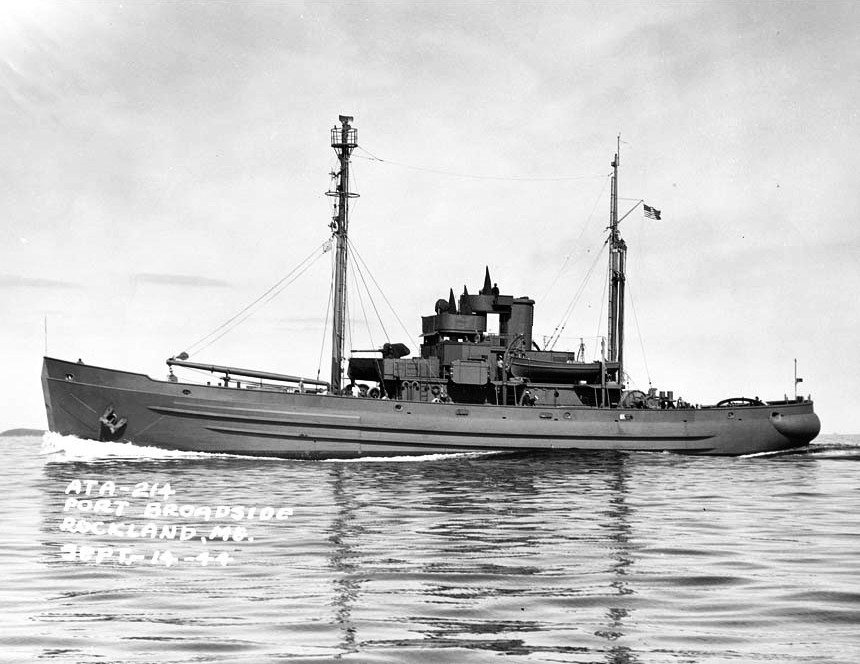
- ATA-214 on trials off Rockland, Maine, 14 September 1944

History

United States
- Name: USS Palo Blanco
- Namesake: the palo blanco tree
- Builder: Canulette Shipbuilding Co., Slidell, Louisiana
- Laid down: 22 May 1943
- Launched: 17 June 1944
- Sponsored by: Mrs. Isabella A. Gamage
- Commissioned: 25 September 1944 as USS [ATA-214]
- Decommissioned: September 1945
- Stricken: date unknown
- Fate: Wrecked off Syria, 9 September 1953

General characteristics
- Type: ATA-214-class auxiliary fleet tug
- Displacement: 1,275 tons
- Length: 194 ft 6 in (59.28 m)
- Beam: 34 ft 7 in (10.54 m)
- Draft: 14 ft 1 in (4.29 m) (full load)
- Propulsion: diesel-electric engines, single screw
- Speed: 12.1 knots
- Complement: 57
- Armament: Two 40 mm gun mounts

USS ATA-214 was the lead ship of the ATA-214 class of tugs for the United States Navy and was built near the end of World War II. Originally laid down as Palo Blanco (YN-85), a net tender of the Ailanthus class, she was redesignated as AN-64, a net layer, before launch. Before completion, the name Palo Blanco was cancelled and the ship was named ATA-214, an unnamed auxiliary ocean tug. Palo Blanco served in the Pacific Theatre during her brief career with the Navy.

== Career ==
Palo Blanco (ATA–214) was laid down 22 May 1943 as YN–85 at Canulette Shipbuilding Co., Slidell, Louisiana; re-designated AN–64, 20 January 1944; launched 17 June 1944; sponsored by Mrs. Isabella A. Gamage; re-designated ATA–214, 12 August 1944; lost the name Palo Blanco; and commissioned 25 September 1944. During her brief war-time career, ATA–214 served in the Pacific Ocean. In July 1945, she provided auxiliary tug services in and around Leyte Gulf. On the 12th, she steamed to Buckner Bay, Okinawa, but returned to San Pedro Bay, Leyte the 25th. After the war, the ship decommissioned in September 1945; she was transferred to the U.S. Maritime Commission 30 April 1947.
