= USS ATA-215 =

Tugboat of the United States Navy

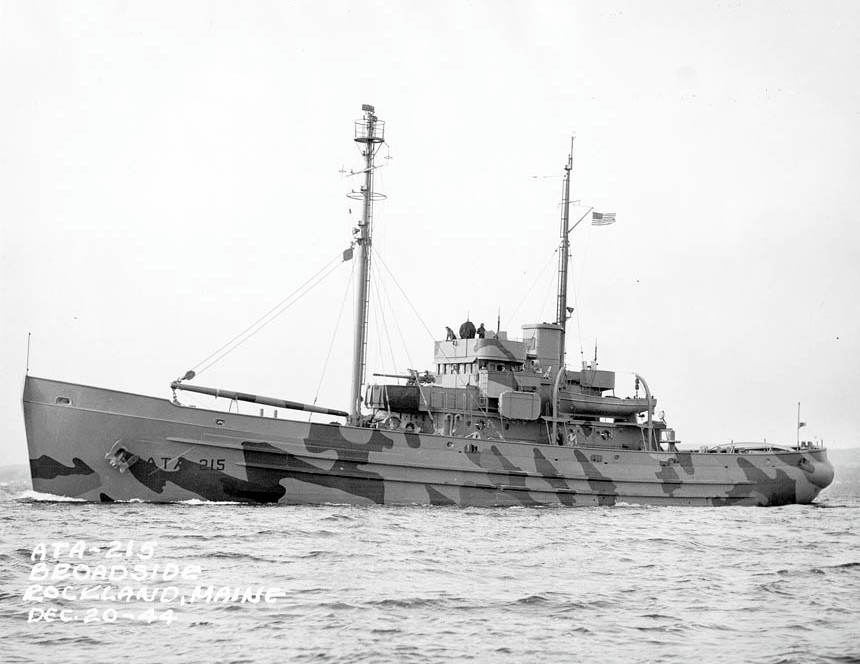
- ATA-215 on trials off Rockland, Maine, on 20 December 1944

History

United States
- Name: USS Paloverde
- Namesake: paloverde tree
- Builder: Snow Shipyards, Inc., Rockland, Maine
- Laid down: 19 July 1943
- Launched: 2 September 1944
- Sponsored by: Miss Patricia Adams
- Commissioned: 17 December 1944 as USS ATA-215
- Decommissioned: March 1946
- Reclassified: net laying ship (AN-65), 20 January 1944; auxiliary fleet tug (ATA-215), 15 May 1944
- Stricken: December 1948
- Fate: Sunk off Newfoundland, 15 April 1963

General characteristics
- Class & type: ATA-214-class tug
- Displacement: 1,275 tons
- Length: 194 ft 6 in (59.28 m)
- Beam: 34 ft 7 in (10.54 m)
- Draft: 14 ft 1 in (4.29 m)
- Propulsion: diesel-electric engines, single screw
- Speed: 12.1 knots
- Complement: 57 officers and enlisted
- Armament: Two 40 mm gun mounts

USS ATA-215 was an ATA-214-class tug of the United States Navy built near the end of World War II. Originally laid down as Paloverde (YN-86), a net tender of the Ailanthus class, she was redesignated as AN-65, a net layer, before launch. Before completion, the name Paloverde was cancelled and the ship was named ATA-215, an unnamed auxiliary ocean tug. Post-war she was assigned to the Finn Ronne Antarctic Expedition where she became stuck in the ice for 12 months before returning to the United States for decommissioning.

== Career ==
Paloverde, originally designated YN–86, was laid down on 19 July 1943 as AN–65 by Snow Shipyards, Inc., Rockland, Maine; renamed and redesignated ATA–215 on 12 August 1944; launched 2 September 1944; sponsored by Miss Patricia Adams; and placed in service 17 December 1944.

ATA–215 was assigned to Service Squadron 2, U.S. Pacific Fleet. She proceeded to Norfolk, Virginia, where she arrived 2 January 1945. Then, getting underway for the U.S. West Coast, she transited the Panama Canal 19–20 February and arrived San Pedro, California, 19 March. She proceeded to Pearl Harbor on a towing assignment, arriving 26 March.

She remained at Pearl Harbor until departing for Eniwetok 11 May, and arrived at Leyte 18 June. On 28 June she proceeded back across the Pacific via Eniwetok for Pearl Harbor. In Pearl Harbor after the war, she was designated for disposal in March 1946.

Later in 1946, Congressional action provided ATA–215 to the Finn Ronne Antarctic Expedition on a loan basis. On 25 January 1947 Edith Ronne rechristened ATA-215 the Port of Beaumont, and the ship shoved off with 21 explorers for the Antarctic. She returned to New York City 15 months later after spending 12 months frozen in the ice pack of Marguerite Bay on the Palmer Peninsula.

She was struck from the Navy List December 1948 and was sold by the Navy 8 February 1949.
