= USS Yaupon =

Tugboat of the United States Navy

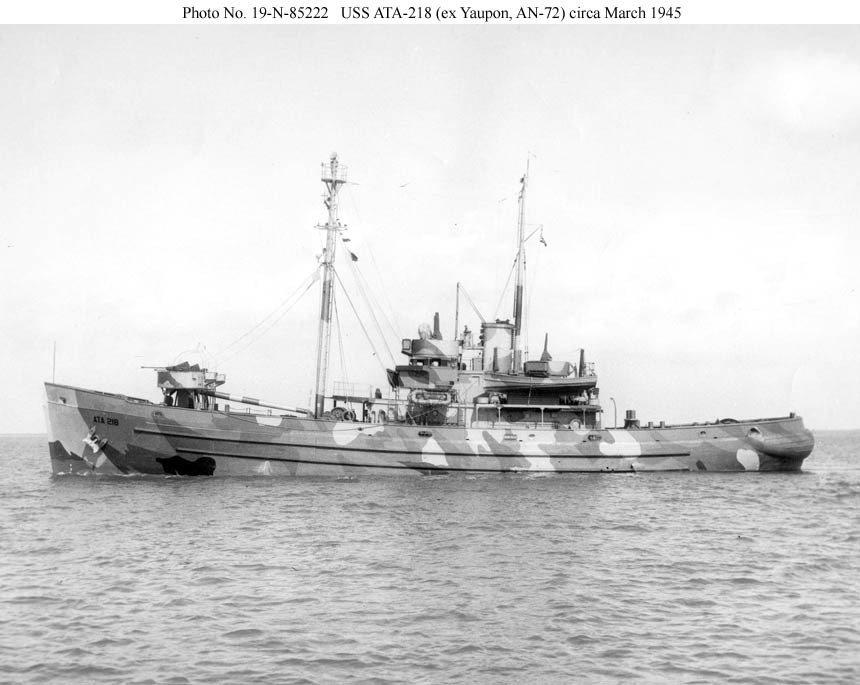
- Yaupon (ATA-218) in c.1945

History

United States
- Name: USS Yaupon (ATA-218)
- Namesake: Yaupon holly tree
- Builder: Canulette Shipbuilding Co., Slidell, Louisiana
- Laid down: 29 January 1944
- Launched: 16 September 1944
- Commissioned: 10 March 1945
- Decommissioned: 26 March 1946
- Reclassified: ordered as YN-96, then AN-96
- Stricken: 17 April 1946
- Fate: Most likely scrapped sometime after 1947

General characteristics
- Type: ATA-214-class auxiliary fleet tug
- Displacement: 1,275 tons
- Length: 194 ft 6 in (59.28 m)
- Beam: 34 ft 7 in (10.54 m)
- Draft: 14 ft 1 in (4.29 m) (full load)
- Propulsion: diesel-electric engines, single screw
- Speed: 12.1 knots
- Complement: 57 officers and enlisted
- Armament: two 40 mm gun mounts

USS Yaupon (ATA-218) was an ATA-214-class tug of the United States Navy built near the end of World War II. Originally laid down as a net tender of the Ailanthus class, she was redesignated before being launched. The ship was commissioned on 10 March 1945. Yaupon had a brief naval career, and was decommissioned on 26 March 1946.

== Construction ==
Originally planned as the Ailanthus-class net laying ship Yaupon (YN-72), the vessel was laid down as an auxiliary net laying ship (AN-72) on 29 January 1944 at Slidell, Louisiana by the Canulette Shipbuilding Company. Her name was officially cancelled on 12 August 1944 and she was again repurposed, to an ATA-214-class tug (ATA-218). She was launched on 16 September 1944. The name cancellation was not implemented and she was commissioned on 10 March 1945 as Yaupon.

== Career ==
Yaupon had a brief navy career. After initial trials and training, during which she allided with an abutment of the bascule bridge at Corpus Christi, Texas, she made one round trip to the Far East. On 27 May 1945, with civilian tug Miraflores, she refloated the tanker Cities Service Fuel, which had gone aground off Galveston. She commenced her first service voyage on 1 June, towing a barge from Westwego, Louisiana for San Diego, California. From there, with another barge, she sailed to Honolulu, Hawaii and thence with a barge and a small tug to Kwajalein Atoll, Marshall Islands and a floating workshop to Buckner Bay, Okinawa, arriving there soon after the Japanese surrender. On return she picked up a floating dock at Enewetak Atoll, Marshall Islands, for Oahu, Hawaii, where it was taken over by USS Chickasaw (ATF-83) for towing to Portland, Oregon, escorted by Yaupon; they departed Oahu in early December and arrived on Christmas Day.

In January 1946, Yaupon was sent to San Francisco to prepare for decommissioning, which took place on 26 March. Her name was struck from the Navy List on 17 April 1946, and she was sold through the War Shipping Administration on 3 January 1947, probably for demolition.
