= List of Latin letters by shape =

The following list are the graphically Latin letters in the Unicode Standard, regardless of whether they are defined as Latin script, as collated by shape (base letter) or by phonetic value. Many are hard-coded formatting variants. For example, the Q series starts out with full-width ｑ, bold 𝐪, italic 𝑞, bold italic 𝒒, script 𝓆, bold script 𝓺, Fraktur 𝔮, double-struck 𝕢, bold Fraktur 𝖖, sans-serif 𝗊, bold sans-serif 𝗾, italic sans-serif 𝘲, bold italic sans-serif 𝙦, monospace 𝚚. Small-capital, superscript, subscript and double-struck italic variants also appear, all of which can be handled by formatting or by choice of font when there is no semantic distinction to maintain.

== a ==
ａ (U+FF41)	◌ͣ (U+0363)	𝐚 (U+1D41A)	𝑎 (U+1D44E)	𝒂 (U+1D482)	𝒶 (U+1D4B6)	𝓪 (U+1D4EA)	𝔞 (U+1D51E)	𝕒 (U+1D552)	𝖆 (U+1D586)
𝖺 (U+1D5BA)	𝗮 (U+1D5EE)	𝘢 (U+1D622)	𝙖 (U+1D656)	𝚊 (U+1D68A)	ⓐ (U+24D0)	A (U+0041)	Ａ (U+FF21)	𝐀 (U+1D400)	𝐴 (U+1D434)
𝑨 (U+1D468)	𝒜 (U+1D49C)	𝓐 (U+1D4D0)	𝔄 (U+1D504)	𝔸 (U+1D538)	𝕬 (U+1D56C)	𝖠 (U+1D5A0)	𝗔 (U+1D5D4)	𝘈 (U+1D608)	𝘼 (U+1D63C)
𝙰 (U+1D670)	Ⓐ (U+24B6)	🅐 (U+1F150)	ª (U+00AA)	ᵃ (U+1D43)	ₐ (U+2090)	ᴬ (U+1D2C)	🄰 (U+1F130)	🅰 (U+1F170)	á (U+00E1)
Á (U+00C1)	à (U+00E0)	À (U+00C0)	ă (U+0103)	Ă (U+0102)	ắ (U+1EAF)	Ắ (U+1EAE)	ằ (U+1EB1)	Ằ (U+1EB0)	ẵ (U+1EB5)
Ẵ (U+1EB4)	ẳ (U+1EB3)	Ẳ (U+1EB2)	â (U+00E2)	Â (U+00C2)	ấ (U+1EA5)	Ấ (U+1EA4)	ầ (U+1EA7)	Ầ (U+1EA6)	ẫ (U+1EAB)
Ẫ (U+1EAA)	ẩ (U+1EA9)	Ẩ (U+1EA8)	ǎ (U+01CE)	Ǎ (U+01CD)	å (U+00E5)	Å (U+00C5)	Å (U+212B)	ǻ (U+01FB)	Ǻ (U+01FA)
ä (U+00E4)	◌ᷲ (U+1DF2)	ꞛ (U+A79B)	Ä (U+00C4)	Ꞛ (U+A79A)	ǟ (U+01DF)	Ǟ (U+01DE)	ã (U+00E3)	Ã (U+00C3)	ȧ (U+0227)
Ȧ (U+0226)	ǡ (U+01E1)	Ǡ (U+01E0)	ą (U+0105)	Ą (U+0104)	ā (U+0101)	Ā (U+0100)	ả (U+1EA3)	Ả (U+1EA2)	ȁ (U+0201)
Ȁ (U+0200)	ȃ (U+0203)	Ȃ (U+0202)	ạ (U+1EA1)	Ạ (U+1EA0)	ặ (U+1EB7)	Ặ (U+1EB6)	ậ (U+1EAD)	Ậ (U+1EAC)	ḁ (U+1E01)
Ḁ (U+1E00)	◌ᷓ (U+1DD3)	㏂ (U+33C2)	℀ (U+2100)	℁ (U+2101)	⅍ (U+214D)	㏟ (U+33DF)	ꜳ (U+A733)	Ꜳ (U+A732)	🆎 (U+1F18E)
æ (U+00E6)	◌ᷔ (U+1DD4)	Æ (U+00C6)	ᴭ (U+1D2D)	ǽ (U+01FD)	Ǽ (U+01FC)	ǣ (U+01E3)	Ǣ (U+01E2)	◌ᷕ (U+1DD5)	ꜵ (U+A735)
Ꜵ (U+A734)	ꜷ (U+A737)	Ꜷ (U+A736)	㍳ (U+3373)	◌ᷖ (U+1DD6)	ꜹ (U+A739)	Ꜹ (U+A738)	ꜻ (U+A73B)	Ꜻ (U+A73A)	ꜽ (U+A73D)
Ꜽ (U+A73C)	ẚ (U+1E9A)								
ᴀ (U+1D00)	ⱥ (U+2C65)	Ⱥ (U+023A)	ᶏ (U+1D8F)	ꞻ (U+A7BB)	Ꞻ (U+A7BA)	ᴁ (U+1D01)	ᴂ (U+1D02)	ᵆ (U+1D46)	ꬱ (U+AB31)
ɐ (U+0250)	Ɐ (U+2C6F)	ᵄ (U+1D44)	ɑ (U+0251)	◌ᷧ (U+1DE7)	Ɑ (U+2C6D)	ᵅ (U+1D45)	ꬰ (U+AB30)	ᶐ (U+1D90)	
ɒ (U+0252)	Ɒ (U+2C70)	ᶛ (U+1D9B)	ꭤ (U+AB64)						

== b ==
ｂ (U+FF42)	◌ᷨ (U+1DE8)	𝐛 (U+1D41B)	𝑏 (U+1D44F)	𝒃 (U+1D483)	𝒷 (U+1D4B7)	𝓫 (U+1D4EB)	𝔟 (U+1D51F)	𝕓 (U+1D553)	𝖇 (U+1D587)
𝖻 (U+1D5BB)	𝗯 (U+1D5EF)	𝘣 (U+1D623)	𝙗 (U+1D657)	𝚋 (U+1D68B)	ⓑ (U+24D1)	B (U+0042)	Ｂ (U+FF22)	ℬ (U+212C)	𝐁 (U+1D401)
𝐵 (U+1D435)	𝑩 (U+1D469)	𝓑 (U+1D4D1)	𝔅 (U+1D505)	𝔹 (U+1D539)	𝕭 (U+1D56D)	𝖡 (U+1D5A1)	𝗕 (U+1D5D5)	𝘉 (U+1D609)	𝘽 (U+1D63D)
𝙱 (U+1D671)	Ⓑ (U+24B7)	🅑 (U+1F151)	ᵇ (U+1D47)	ᴮ (U+1D2E)	🄱 (U+1F131)	🅱 (U+1F171)	ḃ (U+1E03)	Ḃ (U+1E02)	ḅ (U+1E05)
Ḅ (U+1E04)	ḇ (U+1E07)	Ḇ (U+1E06)	㍴ (U+3374)	㏃ (U+33C3)					
ʙ (U+0299)	ƀ (U+0180)	Ƀ (U+0243)	ᴯ (U+1D2F)	ᴃ (U+1D03)	ᵬ (U+1D6C)	ꞗ (U+A797)	Ꞗ (U+A796)	ᶀ (U+1D80)	
ɓ (U+0253)	Ɓ (U+0181)	ƃ (U+0183)	Ƃ (U+0182)	ꞵ (U+A7B5)	◌ᷩ (U+1DE9)	Ꞵ (U+A7B4)			

== c ==
ｃ (U+FF43)	◌ͨ (U+0368)	ⅽ (U+217D)	𝐜 (U+1D41C)	𝑐 (U+1D450)	𝒄 (U+1D484)	𝒸 (U+1D4B8)	𝓬 (U+1D4EC)	𝔠 (U+1D520)	𝕔 (U+1D554)
𝖈 (U+1D588)	𝖼 (U+1D5BC)	𝗰 (U+1D5F0)	𝘤 (U+1D624)	𝙘 (U+1D658)	𝚌 (U+1D68C)	ⓒ (U+24D2)	C (U+0043)	Ｃ (U+FF23)	Ⅽ (U+216D)
ℂ (U+2102)	ℭ (U+212D)	𝐂 (U+1D402)	𝐶 (U+1D436)	𝑪 (U+1D46A)	𝒞 (U+1D49E)	𝓒 (U+1D4D2)	𝕮 (U+1D56E)	𝖢 (U+1D5A2)	𝗖 (U+1D5D6)
𝘊 (U+1D60A)	𝘾 (U+1D63E)	𝙲 (U+1D672)	Ⓒ (U+24B8)	🄫 (U+1F12B)	🅒 (U+1F152)	ᶜ (U+1D9C)	🄲 (U+1F132)	🅲 (U+1F172)	ć (U+0107)
Ć (U+0106)	ĉ (U+0109)	Ĉ (U+0108)	č (U+010D)	Č (U+010C)	ċ (U+010B)	Ċ (U+010A)	ç (U+00E7)	◌ᷗ (U+1DD7)	Ç (U+00C7)
ḉ (U+1E09)	Ḉ (U+1E08)	℅ (U+2105)	℆ (U+2106)	㏆ (U+33C6)	㎈ (U+3388)	㏄ (U+33C4)	🄭 (U+1F12D)	㏅ (U+33C5)	🆑 (U+1F191)
㎝ (U+339D)	㎠ (U+33A0)	㎤ (U+33A4)	㏇ (U+33C7)	🆒 (U+1F192)					
ᴄ (U+1D04)	ȼ (U+023C)	Ȼ (U+023B)	ꞓ (U+A793)	Ꞓ (U+A792)	ꞔ (U+A794)	Ꞔ (U+A7C4)	ƈ (U+0188)	Ƈ (U+0187)	ʗ (U+0297)
ɕ (U+0255)	ᶝ (U+1D9D)	ↄ (U+2184)	Ↄ (U+2183)	ꜿ (U+A73F)	Ꜿ (U+A73E)				

== d ==
ｄ (U+FF44)	◌ͩ (U+0369)	ⅾ (U+217E)	ⅆ (U+2146)	𝐝 (U+1D41D)	𝑑 (U+1D451)	𝒅 (U+1D485)	𝒹 (U+1D4B9)	𝓭 (U+1D4ED)	𝔡 (U+1D521)
𝕕 (U+1D555)	𝖉 (U+1D589)	𝖽 (U+1D5BD)	𝗱 (U+1D5F1)	𝘥 (U+1D625)	𝙙 (U+1D659)	𝚍 (U+1D68D)	ⓓ (U+24D3)	D (U+0044)	Ｄ (U+FF24)
Ⅾ (U+216E)	ⅅ (U+2145)	𝐃 (U+1D403)	𝐷 (U+1D437)	𝑫 (U+1D46B)	𝒟 (U+1D49F)	𝓓 (U+1D4D3)	𝔇 (U+1D507)	𝔻 (U+1D53B)	𝕯 (U+1D56F)
𝖣 (U+1D5A3)	𝗗 (U+1D5D7)	𝘋 (U+1D60B)	𝘿 (U+1D63F)	𝙳 (U+1D673)	Ⓓ (U+24B9)	🅓 (U+1F153)	ᵈ (U+1D48)	🆥 (U+1F1A5)	ᴰ (U+1D30)
🄳 (U+1F133)	🅳 (U+1F173)	ď (U+010F)	Ď (U+010E)	ḋ (U+1E0B)	Ḋ (U+1E0A)	ḑ (U+1E11)	Ḑ (U+1E10)	đ (U+0111)	Đ (U+0110)
ḍ (U+1E0D)	Ḍ (U+1E0C)	ḓ (U+1E13)	Ḓ (U+1E12)	ḏ (U+1E0F)	Ḏ (U+1E0E)	ð (U+00F0)	◌ᷙ (U+1DD9)	Ð (U+00D0)	ᶞ (U+1D9E)
◌ᷘ (U+1DD8)	ꝺ (U+A77A)	Ꝺ (U+A779)	㍲ (U+3372)	ȸ (U+0238)	㏈ (U+33C8)	🆐 (U+1F190)	㎗ (U+3397)	㍷ (U+3377)	㍸ (U+3378)
㍹ (U+3379)	ǳ (U+01F3)	ʣ (U+02A3)	ǲ (U+01F2)	Ǳ (U+01F1)	ǆ (U+01C6)	ǅ (U+01C5)	Ǆ (U+01C4)	ꭦ (U+AB66)	ʥ (U+02A5)
ʤ (U+02A4)									
ᴅ (U+1D05)	ᴆ (U+1D06)	ᵭ (U+1D6D)	ᶁ (U+1D81)	ɖ (U+0256)	Ɖ (U+0189)	ɗ (U+0257)	Ɗ (U+018A)	ᶑ (U+1D91)	
ƌ (U+018C)	Ƌ (U+018B)	ȡ (U+0221)	ꝱ (U+A771)	ẟ (U+1E9F)					

== e ==
ｅ (U+FF45)	◌ͤ (U+0364)	ℯ (U+212F)	ⅇ (U+2147)	𝐞 (U+1D41E)	𝑒 (U+1D452)	𝒆 (U+1D486)	𝓮 (U+1D4EE)	𝔢 (U+1D522)	𝕖 (U+1D556)
𝖊 (U+1D58A)	𝖾 (U+1D5BE)	𝗲 (U+1D5F2)	𝘦 (U+1D626)	𝙚 (U+1D65A)	𝚎 (U+1D68E)	ⓔ (U+24D4)	E (U+0045)	Ｅ (U+FF25)	ℰ (U+2130)
𝐄 (U+1D404)	𝐸 (U+1D438)	𝑬 (U+1D46C)	𝓔 (U+1D4D4)	𝔈 (U+1D508)	𝔼 (U+1D53C)	𝕰 (U+1D570)	𝖤 (U+1D5A4)	𝗘 (U+1D5D8)	𝘌 (U+1D60C)
𝙀 (U+1D640)	𝙴 (U+1D674)	Ⓔ (U+24BA)	🅔 (U+1F154)	ᵉ (U+1D49)	ₑ (U+2091)	ᴱ (U+1D31)	🄴 (U+1F134)	🅴 (U+1F174)	é (U+00E9)
É (U+00C9)	è (U+00E8)	È (U+00C8)	ĕ (U+0115)	Ĕ (U+0114)	ê (U+00EA)	Ê (U+00CA)	ế (U+1EBF)	Ế (U+1EBE)	ề (U+1EC1)
Ề (U+1EC0)	ễ (U+1EC5)	Ễ (U+1EC4)	ể (U+1EC3)	Ể (U+1EC2)	ě (U+011B)	Ě (U+011A)	ë (U+00EB)	Ë (U+00CB)	ẽ (U+1EBD)
Ẽ (U+1EBC)	ė (U+0117)	Ė (U+0116)	ȩ (U+0229)	Ȩ (U+0228)	ḝ (U+1E1D)	Ḝ (U+1E1C)	ę (U+0119)	Ę (U+0118)	ē (U+0113)
Ē (U+0112)	ḗ (U+1E17)	Ḗ (U+1E16)	ḕ (U+1E15)	Ḕ (U+1E14)	ẻ (U+1EBB)	Ẻ (U+1EBA)	ȅ (U+0205)	Ȅ (U+0204)	ȇ (U+0207)
Ȇ (U+0206)	ẹ (U+1EB9)	Ẹ (U+1EB8)	ệ (U+1EC7)	Ệ (U+1EC6)	ḙ (U+1E19)	Ḙ (U+1E18)	ḛ (U+1E1B)	Ḛ (U+1E1A)	㋍ (U+32CD)
㋎ (U+32CE)									
ᴇ (U+1D07)	ꬲ (U+AB32)	ꬳ (U+AB33)	ɇ (U+0247)	Ɇ (U+0246)	ᶒ (U+1D92)	ꬴ (U+AB34)	ⱸ (U+2C78)		
ǝ (U+01DD)	Ǝ (U+018E)	ᴲ (U+1D32)	ⱻ (U+2C7B)	ə (U+0259)	◌ᷪ (U+1DEA)	Ə (U+018F)	ᵊ (U+1D4A)	ₔ (U+2094)	ᶕ (U+1D95)
ɛ (U+025B)	Ɛ (U+0190)	ℇ (U+2107)	ᵋ (U+1D4B)	ᶓ (U+1D93)	ɘ (U+0258)	ɚ (U+025A)	ɜ (U+025C)	Ɜ (U+A7AB)	ᶟ (U+1D9F)
ᶔ (U+1D94)	ᴈ (U+1D08)	ᵌ (U+1D4C)	ɝ (U+025D)	ɞ (U+025E)	ʚ (U+029A)	ɤ (U+0264)			

== f ==
ｆ (U+FF46)	◌ᷫ (U+1DEB)	𝐟 (U+1D41F)	𝑓 (U+1D453)	𝒇 (U+1D487)	𝒻 (U+1D4BB)	𝓯 (U+1D4EF)	𝔣 (U+1D523)	𝕗 (U+1D557)	𝖋 (U+1D58B)
𝖿 (U+1D5BF)	𝗳 (U+1D5F3)	𝘧 (U+1D627)	𝙛 (U+1D65B)	𝚏 (U+1D68F)	ⓕ (U+24D5)	F (U+0046)	Ｆ (U+FF26)	ℱ (U+2131)	𝐅 (U+1D405)
𝐹 (U+1D439)	𝑭 (U+1D46D)	𝓕 (U+1D4D5)	𝔉 (U+1D509)	𝔽 (U+1D53D)	𝕱 (U+1D571)	𝖥 (U+1D5A5)	𝗙 (U+1D5D9)	𝘍 (U+1D60D)	𝙁 (U+1D641)
𝙵 (U+1D675)	Ⓕ (U+24BB)	🅕 (U+1F155)	ᶠ (U+1DA0)	🄵 (U+1F135)	🅵 (U+1F175)	ḟ (U+1E1F)	Ḟ (U+1E1E)	ꝼ (U+A77C)	Ꝼ (U+A77B)
℻ (U+213B)	ﬀ (U+FB00)	ﬃ (U+FB03)	ﬄ (U+FB04)	ﬁ (U+FB01)	ﬂ (U+FB02)	㎙ (U+3399)	ʩ (U+02A9)	🆓 (U+1F193)	
ꜰ (U+A730)	ꬵ (U+AB35)	ꞙ (U+A799)	Ꞙ (U+A798)	ᵮ (U+1D6E)	ᶂ (U+1D82)	ƒ (U+0192)	Ƒ (U+0191)	ⅎ (U+214E)	Ⅎ (U+2132)
ꟻ (U+A7FB)									

== g ==
ｇ (U+FF47)	◌ᷚ (U+1DDA)	ℊ (U+210A)	𝐠 (U+1D420)	𝑔 (U+1D454)	𝒈 (U+1D488)	𝓰 (U+1D4F0)	𝔤 (U+1D524)	𝕘 (U+1D558)	𝖌 (U+1D58C)
𝗀 (U+1D5C0)	𝗴 (U+1D5F4)	𝘨 (U+1D628)	𝙜 (U+1D65C)	𝚐 (U+1D690)	ⓖ (U+24D6)	G (U+0047)	Ｇ (U+FF27)	𝐆 (U+1D406)	𝐺 (U+1D43A)
𝑮 (U+1D46E)	𝒢 (U+1D4A2)	𝓖 (U+1D4D6)	𝔊 (U+1D50A)	𝔾 (U+1D53E)	𝕲 (U+1D572)	𝖦 (U+1D5A6)	𝗚 (U+1D5DA)	𝘎 (U+1D60E)	𝙂 (U+1D642)
𝙶 (U+1D676)	Ⓖ (U+24BC)	🅖 (U+1F156)	ᵍ (U+1D4D)	ᴳ (U+1D33)	🄶 (U+1F136)	🅶 (U+1F176)	ǵ (U+01F5)	Ǵ (U+01F4)	ğ (U+011F)
Ğ (U+011E)	ĝ (U+011D)	Ĝ (U+011C)	ǧ (U+01E7)	Ǧ (U+01E6)	ġ (U+0121)	Ġ (U+0120)	ģ (U+0123)	Ģ (U+0122)	ḡ (U+1E21)
Ḡ (U+1E20)	ꞡ (U+A7A1)	Ꞡ (U+A7A0)	ᵹ (U+1D79)	Ᵹ (U+A77D)	㏿ (U+33FF)	㎇ (U+3387)	㎓ (U+3393)	㎬ (U+33AC)	㏉ (U+33C9)
ɡ (U+0261)	Ɡ (U+A7AC)	ᶢ (U+1DA2)	ꬶ (U+AB36)	ɢ (U+0262)	◌ᷛ (U+1DDB)	ǥ (U+01E5)	Ǥ (U+01E4)	ᶃ (U+1D83)	
ɠ (U+0260)	Ɠ (U+0193)	ʛ (U+029B)	ᵷ (U+1D77)	ꝿ (U+A77F)	Ꝿ (U+A77E)	ɣ (U+0263)	Ɣ (U+0194)	ˠ (U+02E0)	
ƣ (U+01A3)	Ƣ (U+01A2)								

== h ==
ｈ (U+FF48)	◌ͪ (U+036A)	ℎ (U+210E)	𝐡 (U+1D421)	𝒉 (U+1D489)	𝒽 (U+1D4BD)	𝓱 (U+1D4F1)	𝔥 (U+1D525)	𝕙 (U+1D559)	𝖍 (U+1D58D)
𝗁 (U+1D5C1)	𝗵 (U+1D5F5)	𝘩 (U+1D629)	𝙝 (U+1D65D)	𝚑 (U+1D691)	ⓗ (U+24D7)	H (U+0048)	Ｈ (U+FF28)	ℋ (U+210B)	ℌ (U+210C)
ℍ (U+210D)	𝐇 (U+1D407)	𝐻 (U+1D43B)	𝑯 (U+1D46F)	𝓗 (U+1D4D7)	𝕳 (U+1D573)	𝖧 (U+1D5A7)	𝗛 (U+1D5DB)	𝘏 (U+1D60F)	𝙃 (U+1D643)
𝙷 (U+1D677)	Ⓗ (U+24BD)	🅗 (U+1F157)	ʰ (U+02B0)	ₕ (U+2095)	ᴴ (U+1D34)	🄷 (U+1F137)	🅷 (U+1F177)	ĥ (U+0125)	Ĥ (U+0124)
ȟ (U+021F)	Ȟ (U+021E)	ḧ (U+1E27)	Ḧ (U+1E26)	ḣ (U+1E23)	Ḣ (U+1E22)	ḩ (U+1E29)	Ḩ (U+1E28)	ħ (U+0127)	ℏ (U+210F)
Ħ (U+0126)	ꟸ (U+A7F8)	ḥ (U+1E25)	Ḥ (U+1E24)	ḫ (U+1E2B)	Ḫ (U+1E2A)	ẖ (U+1E96)	㏊ (U+33CA)	🆦 (U+1F1A6)	🆧 (U+1F1A7)
㋌ (U+32CC)	🆨 (U+1F1A8)	㏋ (U+33CB)	㍱ (U+3371)	🅊 (U+1F14A)	㎐ (U+3390)				
ʜ (U+029C)	ƕ (U+0195)	Ƕ (U+01F6)	ꞕ (U+A795)	ɦ (U+0266)	Ɦ (U+A7AA)	ʱ (U+02B1)	ⱨ (U+2C68)	Ⱨ (U+2C67)	
ⱶ (U+2C76)	Ⱶ (U+2C75)	ꜧ (U+A727)	Ꜧ (U+A726)	ꭜ (U+AB5C)	ɧ (U+0267)				

== i ==
ｉ (U+FF49)	◌ͥ (U+0365)	ⅰ (U+2170)	ℹ (U+2139)	ⅈ (U+2148)	𝐢 (U+1D422)	𝑖 (U+1D456)	𝒊 (U+1D48A)	𝒾 (U+1D4BE)	𝓲 (U+1D4F2)
𝔦 (U+1D526)	𝕚 (U+1D55A)	𝖎 (U+1D58E)	𝗂 (U+1D5C2)	𝗶 (U+1D5F6)	𝘪 (U+1D62A)	𝙞 (U+1D65E)	𝚒 (U+1D692)	ⓘ (U+24D8)	I (U+0049)
Ｉ (U+FF29)	Ⅰ (U+2160)	ℐ (U+2110)	ℑ (U+2111)	𝐈 (U+1D408)	𝐼 (U+1D43C)	𝑰 (U+1D470)	𝓘 (U+1D4D8)	𝕀 (U+1D540)	𝕴 (U+1D574)
𝖨 (U+1D5A8)	𝗜 (U+1D5DC)	𝘐 (U+1D610)	𝙄 (U+1D644)	𝙸 (U+1D678)	Ⓘ (U+24BE)	🅘 (U+1F158)	ⁱ (U+2071)	ᵢ (U+1D62)	ᴵ (U+1D35)
🄸 (U+1F138)	🅸 (U+1F178)	í (U+00ED)	Í (U+00CD)	ì (U+00EC)	Ì (U+00CC)	ĭ (U+012D)	Ĭ (U+012C)	î (U+00EE)	Î (U+00CE)
ǐ (U+01D0)	Ǐ (U+01CF)	ï (U+00EF)	Ï (U+00CF)	ḯ (U+1E2F)	Ḯ (U+1E2E)	ĩ (U+0129)	Ĩ (U+0128)	İ (U+0130)	į (U+012F)
Į (U+012E)	ī (U+012B)	Ī (U+012A)	ỉ (U+1EC9)	Ỉ (U+1EC8)	ȉ (U+0209)	Ȉ (U+0208)	ȋ (U+020B)	Ȋ (U+020A)	ị (U+1ECB)
Ị (U+1ECA)	ḭ (U+1E2D)	Ḭ (U+1E2C)	🆋 (U+1F18B)	🆔 (U+1F194)	ⅱ (U+2171)	Ⅱ (U+2161)	ⅲ (U+2172)	Ⅲ (U+2162)	ĳ (U+0133)
Ĳ (U+0132)	㏌ (U+33CC)	㍺ (U+337A)	ⅳ (U+2173)	Ⅳ (U+2163)	ⅸ (U+2178)	Ⅸ (U+2168)			
ı (U+0131)	𝚤 (U+1D6A4)	ɪ (U+026A)	Ɪ (U+A7AE)	ᶦ (U+1DA6)	ꟾ (U+A7FE)	ꟷ (U+A7F7)	ᴉ (U+1D09)	ᵎ (U+1D4E)	
ɨ (U+0268)	Ɨ (U+0197)	ᶤ (U+1DA4)	ᵻ (U+1D7B)	ᶧ (U+1DA7)	ᶖ (U+1D96)	ꞽ (U+A7BD)	Ꞽ (U+A7BC)		
ɩ (U+0269)	Ɩ (U+0196)	ᶥ (U+1DA5)	ᵼ (U+1D7C)						

== j ==
ｊ (U+FF4A)	ⅉ (U+2149)	𝐣 (U+1D423)	𝑗 (U+1D457)	𝒋 (U+1D48B)	𝒿 (U+1D4BF)	𝓳 (U+1D4F3)	𝔧 (U+1D527)	𝕛 (U+1D55B)	𝖏 (U+1D58F)
𝗃 (U+1D5C3)	𝗷 (U+1D5F7)	𝘫 (U+1D62B)	𝙟 (U+1D65F)	𝚓 (U+1D693)	ⓙ (U+24D9)	J (U+004A)	Ｊ (U+FF2A)	𝐉 (U+1D409)	𝐽 (U+1D43D)
𝑱 (U+1D471)	𝒥 (U+1D4A5)	𝓙 (U+1D4D9)	𝔍 (U+1D50D)	𝕁 (U+1D541)	𝕵 (U+1D575)	𝖩 (U+1D5A9)	𝗝 (U+1D5DD)	𝘑 (U+1D611)	𝙅 (U+1D645)
𝙹 (U+1D679)	Ⓙ (U+24BF)	🅙 (U+1F159)	ʲ (U+02B2)	ⱼ (U+2C7C)	ᴶ (U+1D36)	🄹 (U+1F139)	🅹 (U+1F179)	ĵ (U+0135)	Ĵ (U+0134)
ǰ (U+01F0)									
ȷ (U+0237)	𝚥 (U+1D6A5)	ᴊ (U+1D0A)	ɉ (U+0249)	Ɉ (U+0248)	ʝ (U+029D)	Ʝ (U+A7B2)	ᶨ (U+1DA8)	ɟ (U+025F)	ᶡ (U+1DA1)
ʄ (U+0284)									

== k ==
ｋ (U+FF4B)	◌ᷜ (U+1DDC)	𝐤 (U+1D424)	𝑘 (U+1D458)	𝒌 (U+1D48C)	𝓀 (U+1D4C0)	𝓴 (U+1D4F4)	𝔨 (U+1D528)	𝕜 (U+1D55C)	𝖐 (U+1D590)
𝗄 (U+1D5C4)	𝗸 (U+1D5F8)	𝘬 (U+1D62C)	𝙠 (U+1D660)	𝚔 (U+1D694)	ⓚ (U+24DA)	K (U+004B)	K (U+212A)	Ｋ (U+FF2B)	𝐊 (U+1D40A)
𝐾 (U+1D43E)	𝑲 (U+1D472)	𝒦 (U+1D4A6)	𝓚 (U+1D4DA)	𝔎 (U+1D50E)	𝕂 (U+1D542)	𝕶 (U+1D576)	𝖪 (U+1D5AA)	𝗞 (U+1D5DE)	𝘒 (U+1D612)
𝙆 (U+1D646)	𝙺 (U+1D67A)	Ⓚ (U+24C0)	🅚 (U+1F15A)	ᵏ (U+1D4F)	ₖ (U+2096)	ᴷ (U+1D37)	🄺 (U+1F13A)	🅺 (U+1F17A)	ḱ (U+1E31)
Ḱ (U+1E30)	ǩ (U+01E9)	Ǩ (U+01E8)	ķ (U+0137)	Ķ (U+0136)	ꞣ (U+A7A3)	Ꞣ (U+A7A2)	ḳ (U+1E33)	Ḳ (U+1E32)	ḵ (U+1E35)
Ḵ (U+1E34)	㎄ (U+3384)	㎅ (U+3385)	㎉ (U+3389)	㎏ (U+338F)	㎑ (U+3391)	㏍ (U+33CD)	㎘ (U+3398)	㎞ (U+339E)	㏎ (U+33CE)
㎢ (U+33A2)	㎦ (U+33A6)	㎪ (U+33AA)	㏏ (U+33CF)	㎸ (U+33B8)	㎾ (U+33BE)	㏀ (U+33C0)			
ᴋ (U+1D0B)	ĸ (U+0138)	ᶄ (U+1D84)	ƙ (U+0199)	Ƙ (U+0198)	ⱪ (U+2C6A)	Ⱪ (U+2C69)	ꝁ (U+A741)	Ꝁ (U+A740)	
ꝃ (U+A743)	Ꝃ (U+A742)	ꝅ (U+A745)	Ꝅ (U+A744)	ʞ (U+029E)	Ʞ (U+A7B0)				

== l ==
ｌ (U+FF4C)	◌ᷝ (U+1DDD)	ⅼ (U+217C)	ℓ (U+2113)	𝐥 (U+1D425)	𝑙 (U+1D459)	𝒍 (U+1D48D)	𝓁 (U+1D4C1)	𝓵 (U+1D4F5)	𝔩 (U+1D529)
𝕝 (U+1D55D)	𝖑 (U+1D591)	𝗅 (U+1D5C5)	𝗹 (U+1D5F9)	𝘭 (U+1D62D)	𝙡 (U+1D661)	𝚕 (U+1D695)	ⓛ (U+24DB)	L (U+004C)	Ｌ (U+FF2C)
Ⅼ (U+216C)	ℒ (U+2112)	𝐋 (U+1D40B)	𝐿 (U+1D43F)	𝑳 (U+1D473)	𝓛 (U+1D4DB)	𝔏 (U+1D50F)	𝕃 (U+1D543)	𝕷 (U+1D577)	𝖫 (U+1D5AB)
𝗟 (U+1D5DF)	𝘓 (U+1D613)	𝙇 (U+1D647)	𝙻 (U+1D67B)	Ⓛ (U+24C1)	🅛 (U+1F15B)	ˡ (U+02E1)	ₗ (U+2097)	ᴸ (U+1D38)	🄻 (U+1F13B)
🅻 (U+1F17B)	ĺ (U+013A)	Ĺ (U+0139)	ľ (U+013E)	Ľ (U+013D)	ļ (U+013C)	Ļ (U+013B)	ł (U+0142)	Ł (U+0141)	ḷ (U+1E37)
Ḷ (U+1E36)	ḹ (U+1E39)	Ḹ (U+1E38)	ḽ (U+1E3D)	Ḽ (U+1E3C)	ḻ (U+1E3B)	Ḻ (U+1E3A)	l· 006C (U+00B7)	l· 006C (U+0387)	ŀ (U+0140)
L· 004C (U+00B7)	L· 004C (U+0387)	Ŀ (U+013F)	ǉ (U+01C9)	ǈ (U+01C8)	Ǉ (U+01C7)	ỻ (U+1EFB)	Ỻ (U+1EFA)	㏐ (U+33D0)	㏑ (U+33D1)
㏒ (U+33D2)	🆩 (U+1F1A9)	ʪ (U+02AA)	㋏ (U+32CF)	㏓ (U+33D3)	ʫ (U+02AB)				
ʟ (U+029F)	◌ᷞ (U+1DDE)	ᶫ (U+1DAB)	ꝇ (U+A747)	Ꝇ (U+A746)	ᴌ (U+1D0C)	ꝉ (U+A749)	Ꝉ (U+A748)	ƚ (U+019A)	Ƚ (U+023D)
ⱡ (U+2C61)	Ⱡ (U+2C60)	ɫ (U+026B)	Ɫ (U+2C62)	ꭞ (U+AB5E)	ꬸ (U+AB38)	◌ᷬ (U+1DEC)	ꬹ (U+AB39)	ɬ (U+026C)	Ɬ (U+A7AD)
ꬷ (U+AB37)	ꭝ (U+AB5D)	ᶅ (U+1D85)	ᶪ (U+1DAA)	ɭ (U+026D)	ᶩ (U+1DA9)	ꞎ (U+A78E)	ȴ (U+0234)	ꝲ (U+A772)	ɮ (U+026E)
ꞁ (U+A781)	Ꞁ (U+A780)	ƛ (U+019B)	ʎ (U+028E)						

== m ==
ｍ (U+FF4D)	◌ͫ (U+036B)	ⅿ (U+217F)	𝐦 (U+1D426)	𝑚 (U+1D45A)	𝒎 (U+1D48E)	𝓂 (U+1D4C2)	𝓶 (U+1D4F6)	𝔪 (U+1D52A)	𝕞 (U+1D55E)
𝖒 (U+1D592)	𝗆 (U+1D5C6)	𝗺 (U+1D5FA)	𝘮 (U+1D62E)	𝙢 (U+1D662)	𝚖 (U+1D696)	ⓜ (U+24DC)	M (U+004D)	Ｍ (U+FF2D)	Ⅿ (U+216F)
ℳ (U+2133)	𝐌 (U+1D40C)	𝑀 (U+1D440)	𝑴 (U+1D474)	𝓜 (U+1D4DC)	𝔐 (U+1D510)	𝕄 (U+1D544)	𝕸 (U+1D578)	𝖬 (U+1D5AC)	𝗠 (U+1D5E0)
𝘔 (U+1D614)	𝙈 (U+1D648)	𝙼 (U+1D67C)	Ⓜ (U+24C2)	🅜 (U+1F15C)	ᵐ (U+1D50)	ₘ (U+2098)	ᴹ (U+1D39)	🄼 (U+1F13C)	🅼 (U+1F17C)
ḿ (U+1E3F)	Ḿ (U+1E3E)	ṁ (U+1E41)	Ṁ (U+1E40)	ṃ (U+1E43)	Ṃ (U+1E42)	㎧ (U+33A7)	㎨ (U+33A8)	㎡ (U+33A1)	㎥ (U+33A5)
㎃ (U+3383)	㏔ (U+33D4)	㎆ (U+3386)	🅪 (U+1F16A)	🅫 (U+1F16B)	㎎ (U+338E)	㎒ (U+3392)	㏕ (U+33D5)	㎖ (U+3396)	㎜ (U+339C)
㎟ (U+339F)	㎣ (U+33A3)	㏖ (U+33D6)	㎫ (U+33AB)	🅬 (U+1F16C)	㎳ (U+33B3)	㎷ (U+33B7)	㎹ (U+33B9)	🅋 (U+1F14B)	㎽ (U+33BD)
㎿ (U+33BF)	㏁ (U+33C1)								
ᴍ (U+1D0D)	◌ᷟ (U+1DDF)	ᵯ (U+1D6F)	ᶆ (U+1D86)	ɱ (U+0271)	Ɱ (U+2C6E)	ᶬ (U+1DAC)	ꬺ (U+AB3A)	ꟽ (U+A7FD)	ꟿ (U+A7FF)
ꝳ (U+A773)									

== n ==
ｎ (U+FF4E)	◌ᷠ (U+1DE0)	𝐧 (U+1D427)	𝑛 (U+1D45B)	𝒏 (U+1D48F)	𝓃 (U+1D4C3)	𝓷 (U+1D4F7)	𝔫 (U+1D52B)	𝕟 (U+1D55F)	𝖓 (U+1D593)
𝗇 (U+1D5C7)	𝗻 (U+1D5FB)	𝘯 (U+1D62F)	𝙣 (U+1D663)	𝚗 (U+1D697)	ⓝ (U+24DD)	N (U+004E)	Ｎ (U+FF2E)	ℕ (U+2115)	𝐍 (U+1D40D)
𝑁 (U+1D441)	𝑵 (U+1D475)	𝒩 (U+1D4A9)	𝓝 (U+1D4DD)	𝔑 (U+1D511)	𝕹 (U+1D579)	𝖭 (U+1D5AD)	𝗡 (U+1D5E1)	𝘕 (U+1D615)	𝙉 (U+1D649)
𝙽 (U+1D67D)	Ⓝ (U+24C3)	🅝 (U+1F15D)	ⁿ (U+207F)	ₙ (U+2099)	ᴺ (U+1D3A)	🄽 (U+1F13D)	🅽 (U+1F17D)	ń (U+0144)	Ń (U+0143)
ǹ (U+01F9)	Ǹ (U+01F8)	ň (U+0148)	Ň (U+0147)	ñ (U+00F1)	Ñ (U+00D1)	ṅ (U+1E45)	Ṅ (U+1E44)	ņ (U+0146)	Ņ (U+0145)
ꞥ (U+A7A5)	Ꞥ (U+A7A4)	ṇ (U+1E47)	Ṇ (U+1E46)	ṋ (U+1E4B)	Ṋ (U+1E4A)	ṉ (U+1E49)	Ṉ (U+1E48)	㎁ (U+3381)	🆕 (U+1F195)
㎋ (U+338B)	🆖 (U+1F196)	ǌ (U+01CC)	ǋ (U+01CB)	Ǌ (U+01CA)	㎚ (U+339A)	№ (U+2116)	㎱ (U+33B1)	㎵ (U+33B5)	㎻ (U+33BB)
ɴ (U+0274)	◌ᷡ (U+1DE1)	ᶰ (U+1DB0)	ᴻ (U+1D3B)	ᴎ (U+1D0E)	ᵰ (U+1D70)	ɲ (U+0272)	Ɲ (U+019D)	ᶮ (U+1DAE)	
ƞ (U+019E)	Ƞ (U+0220)	ꞑ (U+A791)	Ꞑ (U+A790)	ᶇ (U+1D87)	ɳ (U+0273)	ᶯ (U+1DAF)	ȵ (U+0235)	ꬻ (U+AB3B)	ꝴ (U+A774)
ŋ (U+014B)	Ŋ (U+014A)	ᵑ (U+1D51)	ꬼ (U+AB3C)						

== o ==
ｏ (U+FF4F)	◌ͦ (U+0366)	ℴ (U+2134)	𝐨 (U+1D428)	𝑜 (U+1D45C)	𝒐 (U+1D490)	𝓸 (U+1D4F8)	𝔬 (U+1D52C)	𝕠 (U+1D560)	𝖔 (U+1D594)
𝗈 (U+1D5C8)	𝗼 (U+1D5FC)	𝘰 (U+1D630)	𝙤 (U+1D664)	𝚘 (U+1D698)	ⓞ (U+24DE)	O (U+004F)	Ｏ (U+FF2F)	𝐎 (U+1D40E)	𝑂 (U+1D442)
𝑶 (U+1D476)	𝒪 (U+1D4AA)	𝓞 (U+1D4DE)	𝔒 (U+1D512)	𝕆 (U+1D546)	𝕺 (U+1D57A)	𝖮 (U+1D5AE)	𝗢 (U+1D5E2)	𝘖 (U+1D616)	𝙊 (U+1D64A)
𝙾 (U+1D67E)	Ⓞ (U+24C4)	🅞 (U+1F15E)	º (U+00BA)	ᵒ (U+1D52)	ₒ (U+2092)	ᴼ (U+1D3C)	🄾 (U+1F13E)	🅾 (U+1F17E)	ó (U+00F3)
Ó (U+00D3)	ò (U+00F2)	Ò (U+00D2)	ŏ (U+014F)	Ŏ (U+014E)	ô (U+00F4)	Ô (U+00D4)	ố (U+1ED1)	Ố (U+1ED0)	ồ (U+1ED3)
Ồ (U+1ED2)	ỗ (U+1ED7)	Ỗ (U+1ED6)	ổ (U+1ED5)	Ổ (U+1ED4)	ǒ (U+01D2)	Ǒ (U+01D1)	ö (U+00F6)	◌ᷳ (U+1DF3)	ꞝ (U+A79D)
Ö (U+00D6)	Ꞝ (U+A79C)	ȫ (U+022B)	Ȫ (U+022A)	ő (U+0151)	Ő (U+0150)	õ (U+00F5)	Õ (U+00D5)	ṍ (U+1E4D)	Ṍ (U+1E4C)
ṏ (U+1E4F)	Ṏ (U+1E4E)	ȭ (U+022D)	Ȭ (U+022C)	ȯ (U+022F)	Ȯ (U+022E)	ȱ (U+0231)	Ȱ (U+0230)	ø (U+00F8)	Ø (U+00D8)
ǿ (U+01FF)	Ǿ (U+01FE)	ǫ (U+01EB)	Ǫ (U+01EA)	ǭ (U+01ED)	Ǭ (U+01EC)	ō (U+014D)	Ō (U+014C)	ṓ (U+1E53)	Ṓ (U+1E52)
ṑ (U+1E51)	Ṑ (U+1E50)	◌ᷭ (U+1DED)	ỏ (U+1ECF)	Ỏ (U+1ECE)	ȍ (U+020D)	Ȍ (U+020C)	ȏ (U+020F)	Ȏ (U+020E)	ơ (U+01A1)
Ơ (U+01A0)	ớ (U+1EDB)	Ớ (U+1EDA)	ờ (U+1EDD)	Ờ (U+1EDC)	ỡ (U+1EE1)	Ỡ (U+1EE0)	ở (U+1EDF)	Ở (U+1EDE)	ợ (U+1EE3)
Ợ (U+1EE2)	ọ (U+1ECD)	Ọ (U+1ECC)	ộ (U+1ED9)	Ộ (U+1ED8)	œ (U+0153)	Œ (U+0152)	ꟹ (U+A7F9)	🆗 (U+1F197)	ꝏ (U+A74F)
Ꝏ (U+A74E)	㍵ (U+3375)								
ᴏ (U+1D0F)	ᴑ (U+1D11)	ꬽ (U+AB3D)	ɶ (U+0276)	ᴔ (U+1D14)	ꭁ (U+AB41)	ꭂ (U+AB42)	ꭀ (U+AB40)	ꭃ (U+AB43)	ꭄ (U+AB44)
ᴓ (U+1D13)	ꬾ (U+AB3E)	ɔ (U+0254)	Ɔ (U+0186)	ᵓ (U+1D53)	ᴐ (U+1D10)	ᴒ (U+1D12)	ꬿ (U+AB3F)	ᶗ (U+1D97)	ꭢ (U+AB62)
ꝍ (U+A74D)	Ꝍ (U+A74C)	ᴖ (U+1D16)	ᵔ (U+1D54)	ᴗ (U+1D17)	ᵕ (U+1D55)	ⱺ (U+2C7A)	ɵ (U+0275)	Ɵ (U+019F)	ᶱ (U+1DB1)
ꝋ (U+A74B)	Ꝋ (U+A74A)	ɷ (U+0277)	ꞷ (U+A7B7)	Ꞷ (U+A7B6)	ȣ (U+0223)	Ȣ (U+0222)	ᴽ (U+1D3D)	ᴕ (U+1D15)	

== p ==
ｐ (U+FF50)	◌ᷮ (U+1DEE)	𝐩 (U+1D429)	𝑝 (U+1D45D)	𝒑 (U+1D491)	𝓅 (U+1D4C5)	𝓹 (U+1D4F9)	𝔭 (U+1D52D)	𝕡 (U+1D561)	𝖕 (U+1D595)
𝗉 (U+1D5C9)	𝗽 (U+1D5FD)	𝘱 (U+1D631)	𝙥 (U+1D665)	𝚙 (U+1D699)	ⓟ (U+24DF)	P (U+0050)	Ｐ (U+FF30)	ℙ (U+2119)	𝐏 (U+1D40F)
𝑃 (U+1D443)	𝑷 (U+1D477)	𝒫 (U+1D4AB)	𝓟 (U+1D4DF)	𝔓 (U+1D513)	𝕻 (U+1D57B)	𝖯 (U+1D5AF)	𝗣 (U+1D5E3)	𝘗 (U+1D617)	𝙋 (U+1D64B)
𝙿 (U+1D67F)	Ⓟ (U+24C5)	🅟 (U+1F15F)	ᵖ (U+1D56)	ₚ (U+209A)	ᴾ (U+1D3E)	🄿 (U+1F13F)	🅿 (U+1F17F)	🆊 (U+1F18A)	ṕ (U+1E55)
Ṕ (U+1E54)	ṗ (U+1E57)	Ṗ (U+1E56)	㏘ (U+33D8)	㎀ (U+3380)	㎩ (U+33A9)	🆌 (U+1F18C)	㍶ (U+3376)	㎊ (U+338A)	㏗ (U+33D7)
㏙ (U+33D9)	🅎 (U+1F14E)	㏚ (U+33DA)	㎰ (U+33B0)	㉐ (U+3250)	㎴ (U+33B4)	㎺ (U+33BA)			
ᴘ (U+1D18)	ᵽ (U+1D7D)	Ᵽ (U+2C63)	ꝑ (U+A751)	Ꝑ (U+A750)	ᵱ (U+1D71)	ᶈ (U+1D88)	ƥ (U+01A5)	Ƥ (U+01A4)	
ꝓ (U+A753)	Ꝓ (U+A752)	ꝕ (U+A755)	Ꝕ (U+A754)	ꟼ (U+A7FC)	ɸ (U+0278)	ᶲ (U+1DB2)	ⱷ (U+2C77)		

== q ==
ｑ (U+FF51)	𝐪 (U+1D42A)	𝑞 (U+1D45E)	𝒒 (U+1D492)	𝓆 (U+1D4C6)	𝓺 (U+1D4FA)	𝔮 (U+1D52E)	𝕢 (U+1D562)	𝖖 (U+1D596)	𝗊 (U+1D5CA)
𝗾 (U+1D5FE)	𝘲 (U+1D632)	𝙦 (U+1D666)	𝚚 (U+1D69A)	ⓠ (U+24E0)	Q (U+0051)	Ｑ (U+FF31)	ℚ (U+211A)	𝐐 (U+1D410)	𝑄 (U+1D444)
𝑸 (U+1D478)	𝒬 (U+1D4AC)	𝓠 (U+1D4E0)	𝔔 (U+1D514)	𝕼 (U+1D57C)	𝖰 (U+1D5B0)	𝗤 (U+1D5E4)	𝘘 (U+1D618)	𝙌 (U+1D64C)	𝚀 (U+1D680)
Ⓠ (U+24C6)	🅠 (U+1F160)	🅀 (U+1F140)	🆀 (U+1F180)	ȹ (U+0239)					
ꞯ (U+A7AF)	ꝗ (U+A757)	Ꝗ (U+A756)	ꝙ (U+A759)	Ꝙ (U+A758)	ʠ (U+02A0)	ɋ (U+024B)	Ɋ (U+024A)	ĸ (U+0138)	

== r ==
ｒ (U+FF52)	◌ͬ (U+036C)	◌᷊ (U+1DCA)	𝐫 (U+1D42B)	𝑟 (U+1D45F)	𝒓 (U+1D493)	𝓇 (U+1D4C7)	𝓻 (U+1D4FB)	𝔯 (U+1D52F)	𝕣 (U+1D563)
𝖗 (U+1D597)	𝗋 (U+1D5CB)	𝗿 (U+1D5FF)	𝘳 (U+1D633)	𝙧 (U+1D667)	𝚛 (U+1D69B)	ⓡ (U+24E1)	R (U+0052)	Ｒ (U+FF32)	ℛ (U+211B)
ℜ (U+211C)	ℝ (U+211D)	𝐑 (U+1D411)	𝑅 (U+1D445)	𝑹 (U+1D479)	𝓡 (U+1D4E1)	𝕽 (U+1D57D)	𝖱 (U+1D5B1)	𝗥 (U+1D5E5)	𝘙 (U+1D619)
𝙍 (U+1D64D)	𝚁 (U+1D681)	Ⓡ (U+24C7)	🄬 (U+1F12C)	🅡 (U+1F161)	ʳ (U+02B3)	ᵣ (U+1D63)	ᴿ (U+1D3F)	🅁 (U+1F141)	🆁 (U+1F181)
ŕ (U+0155)	Ŕ (U+0154)	ř (U+0159)	Ř (U+0158)	ṙ (U+1E59)	Ṙ (U+1E58)	ŗ (U+0157)	Ŗ (U+0156)	ꞧ (U+A7A7)	Ꞧ (U+A7A6)
ȑ (U+0211)	Ȑ (U+0210)	ȓ (U+0213)	Ȓ (U+0212)	ṛ (U+1E5B)	Ṛ (U+1E5A)	ṝ (U+1E5D)	Ṝ (U+1E5C)	ṟ (U+1E5F)	Ṟ (U+1E5E)
ꞃ (U+A783)	Ꞃ (U+A782)	㎭ (U+33AD)	㎮ (U+33AE)	㎯ (U+33AF)	₨ (U+20A8)				
ꭅ (U+AB45)	ʀ (U+0280)	◌ᷢ (U+1DE2)	Ʀ (U+01A6)	ꭆ (U+AB46)	ꝛ (U+A75B)	◌ᷣ (U+1DE3)	Ꝛ (U+A75A)	ᴙ (U+1D19)	
ɍ (U+024D)	Ɍ (U+024C)	ᵲ (U+1D72)	ɹ (U+0279)	ʴ (U+02B4)	ᴚ (U+1D1A)	ɺ (U+027A)	ᶉ (U+1D89)	ɻ (U+027B)	ʵ (U+02B5)
ⱹ (U+2C79)	ɼ (U+027C)	ɽ (U+027D)	Ɽ (U+2C64)	ꭉ (U+AB49)	ɾ (U+027E)	ᵳ (U+1D73)	ɿ (U+027F)	ꭇ (U+AB47)	ꭈ (U+AB48)
ꭊ (U+AB4A)	ꭋ (U+AB4B)	ꭌ (U+AB4C)	ʁ (U+0281)	ʶ (U+02B6)	ꝵ (U+A775)	ꝶ (U+A776)	ꝝ (U+A75D)	Ꝝ (U+A75C)	

== s ==
ｓ (U+FF53)	◌ᷤ (U+1DE4)	𝐬 (U+1D42C)	𝑠 (U+1D460)	𝒔 (U+1D494)	𝓈 (U+1D4C8)	𝓼 (U+1D4FC)	𝔰 (U+1D530)	𝕤 (U+1D564)	𝖘 (U+1D598)
𝗌 (U+1D5CC)	𝘀 (U+1D600)	𝘴 (U+1D634)	𝙨 (U+1D668)	𝚜 (U+1D69C)	ⓢ (U+24E2)	S (U+0053)	Ｓ (U+FF33)	𝐒 (U+1D412)	𝑆 (U+1D446)
𝑺 (U+1D47A)	𝒮 (U+1D4AE)	𝓢 (U+1D4E2)	𝔖 (U+1D516)	𝕊 (U+1D54A)	𝕾 (U+1D57E)	𝖲 (U+1D5B2)	𝗦 (U+1D5E6)	𝘚 (U+1D61A)	𝙎 (U+1D64E)
𝚂 (U+1D682)	Ⓢ (U+24C8)	🅢 (U+1F162)	ˢ (U+02E2)	ₛ (U+209B)	🅂 (U+1F142)	🆂 (U+1F182)	ś (U+015B)	Ś (U+015A)	ṥ (U+1E65)
Ṥ (U+1E64)	ŝ (U+015D)	Ŝ (U+015C)	š (U+0161)	Š (U+0160)	ṧ (U+1E67)	Ṧ (U+1E66)	ṡ (U+1E61)	Ṡ (U+1E60)	ş (U+015F)
Ş (U+015E)	ꞩ (U+A7A9)	Ꞩ (U+A7A8)	ṣ (U+1E63)	Ṣ (U+1E62)	ṩ (U+1E69)	Ṩ (U+1E68)	ș (U+0219)	Ș (U+0218)	ſ (U+017F)
◌ᷥ (U+1DE5)	ꞅ (U+A785)	Ꞅ (U+A784)	ẛ (U+1E9B)	🆍 (U+1F18D)	🅌 (U+1F14C)	🆪 (U+1F1AA)	℠ (U+2120)	🆘 (U+1F198)	㏛ (U+33DB)
🅍 (U+1F14D)	ß (U+00DF)	ẞ (U+1E9E)	ﬆ (U+FB06)	ﬅ (U+FB05)	㏜ (U+33DC)				
ꜱ (U+A731)	ᵴ (U+1D74)	ᶊ (U+1D8A)	ʂ (U+0282)	Ʂ (U+A7C5)	ᶳ (U+1DB3)	ȿ (U+023F)	Ȿ (U+2C7E)	ẜ (U+1E9C)	ẝ (U+1E9D)
ʃ (U+0283)	◌ᷯ (U+1DEF)	Ʃ (U+01A9)	ᶴ (U+1DB4)	ꭍ (U+AB4D)	ᶋ (U+1D8B)	ƪ (U+01AA)	ʅ (U+0285)	ᶘ (U+1D98)	ʆ (U+0286)

== t ==
ｔ (U+FF54)	◌ͭ (U+036D)	𝐭 (U+1D42D)	𝑡 (U+1D461)	𝒕 (U+1D495)	𝓉 (U+1D4C9)	𝓽 (U+1D4FD)	𝔱 (U+1D531)	𝕥 (U+1D565)	𝖙 (U+1D599)
𝗍 (U+1D5CD)	𝘁 (U+1D601)	𝘵 (U+1D635)	𝙩 (U+1D669)	𝚝 (U+1D69D)	ⓣ (U+24E3)	T (U+0054)	Ｔ (U+FF34)	𝐓 (U+1D413)	𝑇 (U+1D447)
𝑻 (U+1D47B)	𝒯 (U+1D4AF)	𝓣 (U+1D4E3)	𝔗 (U+1D517)	𝕋 (U+1D54B)	𝕿 (U+1D57F)	𝖳 (U+1D5B3)	𝗧 (U+1D5E7)	𝘛 (U+1D61B)	𝙏 (U+1D64F)
𝚃 (U+1D683)	Ⓣ (U+24C9)	🅣 (U+1F163)	ᵗ (U+1D57)	ₜ (U+209C)	ᵀ (U+1D40)	🅃 (U+1F143)	🆃 (U+1F183)	ť (U+0165)	Ť (U+0164)
ẗ (U+1E97)	ṫ (U+1E6B)	Ṫ (U+1E6A)	ţ (U+0163)	Ţ (U+0162)	ṭ (U+1E6D)	Ṭ (U+1E6C)	ț (U+021B)	Ț (U+021A)	ṱ (U+1E71)
Ṱ (U+1E70)	ṯ (U+1E6F)	Ṯ (U+1E6E)	ꞇ (U+A787)	Ꞇ (U+A786)	ʨ (U+02A8)	℡ (U+2121)	ᵺ (U+1D7A)	㎔ (U+3394)	™ (U+2122)
ƾ (U+01BE)	ʦ (U+02A6)	ꭧ (U+AB67)	ʧ (U+02A7)	ꜩ (U+A729)	Ꜩ (U+A728)				
ᴛ (U+1D1B)	ŧ (U+0167)	Ŧ (U+0166)	ⱦ (U+2C66)	Ⱦ (U+023E)	ᵵ (U+1D75)	ƫ (U+01AB)	ᶵ (U+1DB5)	ƭ (U+01AD)	Ƭ (U+01AC)
ʈ (U+0288)	Ʈ (U+01AE)	ȶ (U+0236)	ꝷ (U+A777)	ʇ (U+0287)	Ʇ (U+A7B1)				

== u ==
ｕ (U+FF55)	◌ͧ (U+0367)	𝐮 (U+1D42E)	𝑢 (U+1D462)	𝒖 (U+1D496)	𝓊 (U+1D4CA)	𝓾 (U+1D4FE)	𝔲 (U+1D532)	𝕦 (U+1D566)	𝖚 (U+1D59A)
𝗎 (U+1D5CE)	𝘂 (U+1D602)	𝘶 (U+1D636)	𝙪 (U+1D66A)	𝚞 (U+1D69E)	ⓤ (U+24E4)	U (U+0055)	Ｕ (U+FF35)	𝐔 (U+1D414)	𝑈 (U+1D448)
𝑼 (U+1D47C)	𝒰 (U+1D4B0)	𝓤 (U+1D4E4)	𝔘 (U+1D518)	𝕌 (U+1D54C)	𝖀 (U+1D580)	𝖴 (U+1D5B4)	𝗨 (U+1D5E8)	𝘜 (U+1D61C)	𝙐 (U+1D650)
𝚄 (U+1D684)	Ⓤ (U+24CA)	🅤 (U+1F164)	ᵘ (U+1D58)	ᵤ (U+1D64)	ᵁ (U+1D41)	🅄 (U+1F144)	🆄 (U+1F184)	ú (U+00FA)	Ú (U+00DA)
ù (U+00F9)	Ù (U+00D9)	ŭ (U+016D)	Ŭ (U+016C)	û (U+00FB)	Û (U+00DB)	ǔ (U+01D4)	Ǔ (U+01D3)	ů (U+016F)	Ů (U+016E)
ü (U+00FC)	◌ᷴ (U+1DF4)	ꞟ (U+A79F)	Ü (U+00DC)	Ꞟ (U+A79E)	ǘ (U+01D8)	Ǘ (U+01D7)	ǜ (U+01DC)	Ǜ (U+01DB)	ǚ (U+01DA)
Ǚ (U+01D9)	ǖ (U+01D6)	Ǖ (U+01D5)	ű (U+0171)	Ű (U+0170)	ũ (U+0169)	Ũ (U+0168)	ṹ (U+1E79)	Ṹ (U+1E78)	ų (U+0173)
Ų (U+0172)	ū (U+016B)	Ū (U+016A)	ṻ (U+1E7B)	Ṻ (U+1E7A)	◌ᷰ (U+1DF0)	ủ (U+1EE7)	Ủ (U+1EE6)	ȕ (U+0215)	Ȕ (U+0214)
ȗ (U+0217)	Ȗ (U+0216)	ư (U+01B0)	Ư (U+01AF)	ứ (U+1EE9)	Ứ (U+1EE8)	ừ (U+1EEB)	Ừ (U+1EEA)	ữ (U+1EEF)	Ữ (U+1EEE)
ử (U+1EED)	Ử (U+1EEC)	ự (U+1EF1)	Ự (U+1EF0)	ụ (U+1EE5)	Ụ (U+1EE4)	ṳ (U+1E73)	Ṳ (U+1E72)	ṷ (U+1E77)	Ṷ (U+1E76)
ṵ (U+1E75)	Ṵ (U+1E74)	🆫 (U+1F1AB)	🆙 (U+1F199)						
ᴜ (U+1D1C)	ᶸ (U+1DB8)	ꭎ (U+AB4E)	ᴝ (U+1D1D)	ᵙ (U+1D59)	ᴞ (U+1D1E)	ᵫ (U+1D6B)	ꭐ (U+AB50)	ꭑ (U+AB51)	
ʉ (U+0289)	Ʉ (U+0244)	ᶶ (U+1DB6)	ꭏ (U+AB4F)	ꞹ (U+A7B9)	Ꞹ (U+A7B8)	ᵾ (U+1D7E)	ᶙ (U+1D99)	ꭒ (U+AB52)	ꭟ (U+AB5F)
ꞿ (U+A7BF)	Ꞿ (U+A7BE)	ɥ (U+0265)	Ɥ (U+A78D)	ᶣ (U+1DA3)	ʮ (U+02AE)	ʯ (U+02AF)	ɯ (U+026F)	Ɯ (U+019C)	ᵚ (U+1D5A)
ꟺ (U+A7FA)	ᴟ (U+1D1F)	ɰ (U+0270)	ᶭ (U+1DAD)	ʊ (U+028A)	Ʊ (U+01B1)	ᶷ (U+1DB7)	ᵿ (U+1D7F)		

== v ==
ｖ (U+FF56)	◌ͮ (U+036E)	ⅴ (U+2174)	𝐯 (U+1D42F)	𝑣 (U+1D463)	𝒗 (U+1D497)	𝓋 (U+1D4CB)	𝓿 (U+1D4FF)	𝔳 (U+1D533)	𝕧 (U+1D567)
𝖛 (U+1D59B)	𝗏 (U+1D5CF)	𝘃 (U+1D603)	𝘷 (U+1D637)	𝙫 (U+1D66B)	𝚟 (U+1D69F)	ⓥ (U+24E5)	V (U+0056)	Ｖ (U+FF36)	Ⅴ (U+2164)
𝐕 (U+1D415)	𝑉 (U+1D449)	𝑽 (U+1D47D)	𝒱 (U+1D4B1)	𝓥 (U+1D4E5)	𝔙 (U+1D519)	𝕍 (U+1D54D)	𝖁 (U+1D581)	𝖵 (U+1D5B5)	𝗩 (U+1D5E9)
𝘝 (U+1D61D)	𝙑 (U+1D651)	𝚅 (U+1D685)	Ⓥ (U+24CB)	🅥 (U+1F165)	ᵛ (U+1D5B)	ᵥ (U+1D65)	ⱽ (U+2C7D)	🅅 (U+1F145)	🆅 (U+1F185)
ṽ (U+1E7D)	Ṽ (U+1E7C)	ṿ (U+1E7F)	Ṿ (U+1E7E)	㏞ (U+33DE)	ⅵ (U+2175)	Ⅵ (U+2165)	ⅶ (U+2176)	Ⅶ (U+2166)	ⅷ (U+2177)
Ⅷ (U+2167)	🆬 (U+1F1AC)	🆚 (U+1F19A)	ꝡ (U+A761)	Ꝡ (U+A760)					
ᴠ (U+1D20)	ꝟ (U+A75F)	Ꝟ (U+A75E)	ᶌ (U+1D8C)	ʋ (U+028B)	Ʋ (U+01B2)	ᶹ (U+1DB9)	ⱱ (U+2C71)	ⱴ (U+2C74)	
ỽ (U+1EFD)	Ỽ (U+1EFC)	ʌ (U+028C)	Ʌ (U+0245)	ᶺ (U+1DBA)					

== w ==
ｗ (U+FF57)	◌ᷱ (U+1DF1)	𝐰 (U+1D430)	𝑤 (U+1D464)	𝒘 (U+1D498)	𝓌 (U+1D4CC)	𝔀 (U+1D500)	𝔴 (U+1D534)	𝕨 (U+1D568)	𝖜 (U+1D59C)
𝗐 (U+1D5D0)	𝘄 (U+1D604)	𝘸 (U+1D638)	𝙬 (U+1D66C)	𝚠 (U+1D6A0)	ⓦ (U+24E6)	W (U+0057)	Ｗ (U+FF37)	𝐖 (U+1D416)	𝑊 (U+1D44A)
𝑾 (U+1D47E)	𝒲 (U+1D4B2)	𝓦 (U+1D4E6)	𝔚 (U+1D51A)	𝕎 (U+1D54E)	𝖂 (U+1D582)	𝖶 (U+1D5B6)	𝗪 (U+1D5EA)	𝘞 (U+1D61E)	𝙒 (U+1D652)
𝚆 (U+1D686)	Ⓦ (U+24CC)	🅦 (U+1F166)	ʷ (U+02B7)	ᵂ (U+1D42)	🅆 (U+1F146)	🆆 (U+1F186)	ẃ (U+1E83)	Ẃ (U+1E82)	ẁ (U+1E81)
Ẁ (U+1E80)	ŵ (U+0175)	Ŵ (U+0174)	ẘ (U+1E98)	ẅ (U+1E85)	Ẅ (U+1E84)	ẇ (U+1E87)	Ẇ (U+1E86)	ẉ (U+1E89)	Ẉ (U+1E88)
㏝ (U+33DD)	🅏 (U+1F14F)	🆏 (U+1F18F)	🄮 (U+1F12E)	ʬ (U+02AC)					
ᴡ (U+1D21)	ꟃ (U+A7C3)	Ꟃ (U+A7C2)	ⱳ (U+2C73)	Ⱳ (U+2C72)	ʍ (U+028D)				

== x ==
ｘ (U+FF58)	◌ͯ (U+036F)	ⅹ (U+2179)	𝐱 (U+1D431)	𝑥 (U+1D465)	𝒙 (U+1D499)	𝓍 (U+1D4CD)	𝔁 (U+1D501)	𝔵 (U+1D535)	𝕩 (U+1D569)
𝖝 (U+1D59D)	𝗑 (U+1D5D1)	𝘅 (U+1D605)	𝘹 (U+1D639)	𝙭 (U+1D66D)	𝚡 (U+1D6A1)	ⓧ (U+24E7)	X (U+0058)	Ｘ (U+FF38)	Ⅹ (U+2169)
𝐗 (U+1D417)	𝑋 (U+1D44B)	𝑿 (U+1D47F)	𝒳 (U+1D4B3)	𝓧 (U+1D4E7)	𝔛 (U+1D51B)	𝕏 (U+1D54F)	𝖃 (U+1D583)	𝖷 (U+1D5B7)	𝗫 (U+1D5EB)
𝘟 (U+1D61F)	𝙓 (U+1D653)	𝚇 (U+1D687)	Ⓧ (U+24CD)	🅧 (U+1F167)	ˣ (U+02E3)	ₓ (U+2093)	🅇 (U+1F147)	🆇 (U+1F187)	ẍ (U+1E8D)
Ẍ (U+1E8C)	ẋ (U+1E8B)	Ẋ (U+1E8A)	ⅺ (U+217A)	Ⅺ (U+216A)	ⅻ (U+217B)	Ⅻ (U+216B)			
ᶍ (U+1D8D)	ꭖ (U+AB56)	ꭗ (U+AB57)	ꭘ (U+AB58)	ꭙ (U+AB59)	ꭓ (U+AB53)	Ꭓ (U+A7B3)	ꭔ (U+AB54)	ꭕ (U+AB55)	

== y ==
ｙ (U+FF59)	𝐲 (U+1D432)	𝑦 (U+1D466)	𝒚 (U+1D49A)	𝓎 (U+1D4CE)	𝔂 (U+1D502)	𝔶 (U+1D536)	𝕪 (U+1D56A)	𝖞 (U+1D59E)	𝗒 (U+1D5D2)
𝘆 (U+1D606)	𝘺 (U+1D63A)	𝙮 (U+1D66E)	𝚢 (U+1D6A2)	ⓨ (U+24E8)	Y (U+0059)	Ｙ (U+FF39)	𝐘 (U+1D418)	𝑌 (U+1D44C)	𝒀 (U+1D480)
𝒴 (U+1D4B4)	𝓨 (U+1D4E8)	𝔜 (U+1D51C)	𝕐 (U+1D550)	𝖄 (U+1D584)	𝖸 (U+1D5B8)	𝗬 (U+1D5EC)	𝘠 (U+1D620)	𝙔 (U+1D654)	𝚈 (U+1D688)
Ⓨ (U+24CE)	🅨 (U+1F168)	ʸ (U+02B8)	🅈 (U+1F148)	🆈 (U+1F188)	ý (U+00FD)	Ý (U+00DD)	ỳ (U+1EF3)	Ỳ (U+1EF2)	ŷ (U+0177)
Ŷ (U+0176)	ẙ (U+1E99)	ÿ (U+00FF)	Ÿ (U+0178)	ỹ (U+1EF9)	Ỹ (U+1EF8)	ẏ (U+1E8F)	Ẏ (U+1E8E)	ȳ (U+0233)	Ȳ (U+0232)
ỷ (U+1EF7)	Ỷ (U+1EF6)	ỵ (U+1EF5)	Ỵ (U+1EF4)						
ʏ (U+028F)	ɏ (U+024F)	Ɏ (U+024E)	ƴ (U+01B4)	Ƴ (U+01B3)	ỿ (U+1EFF)	Ỿ (U+1EFE)	ꭚ (U+AB5A)	ȝ (U+021D)	Ȝ (U+021C)

== z ==
ｚ (U+FF5A)	◌ᷦ (U+1DE6)	𝐳 (U+1D433)	𝑧 (U+1D467)	𝒛 (U+1D49B)	𝓏 (U+1D4CF)	𝔃 (U+1D503)	𝔷 (U+1D537)	𝕫 (U+1D56B)	𝖟 (U+1D59F)
𝗓 (U+1D5D3)	𝘇 (U+1D607)	𝘻 (U+1D63B)	𝙯 (U+1D66F)	𝚣 (U+1D6A3)	ⓩ (U+24E9)	Z (U+005A)	Ｚ (U+FF3A)	ℤ (U+2124)	ℨ (U+2128)
𝐙 (U+1D419)	𝑍 (U+1D44D)	𝒁 (U+1D481)	𝒵 (U+1D4B5)	𝓩 (U+1D4E9)	𝖅 (U+1D585)	𝖹 (U+1D5B9)	𝗭 (U+1D5ED)	𝘡 (U+1D621)	𝙕 (U+1D655)
𝚉 (U+1D689)	Ⓩ (U+24CF)	🅩 (U+1F169)	ᶻ (U+1DBB)	🅉 (U+1F149)	🆉 (U+1F189)	ź (U+017A)	Ź (U+0179)	ẑ (U+1E91)	Ẑ (U+1E90)
ž (U+017E)	Ž (U+017D)	ż (U+017C)	Ż (U+017B)	ẓ (U+1E93)	Ẓ (U+1E92)	ẕ (U+1E95)	Ẕ (U+1E94)	ƍ (U+018D)	
ᴢ (U+1D22)	ƶ (U+01B6)	Ƶ (U+01B5)	ᵶ (U+1D76)	ᶎ (U+1D8E)	Ᶎ (U+A7C6)	ȥ (U+0225)	Ȥ (U+0224)	ʐ (U+0290)	ᶼ (U+1DBC)
ʑ (U+0291)	ᶽ (U+1DBD)	ɀ (U+0240)	Ɀ (U+2C7F)	ⱬ (U+2C6C)	Ⱬ (U+2C6B)	ꝣ (U+A763)	Ꝣ (U+A762)		
ʒ (U+0292)	Ʒ (U+01B7)	ᶾ (U+1DBE)	ǯ (U+01EF)	Ǯ (U+01EE)	ᴣ (U+1D23)	ƹ (U+01B9)	Ƹ (U+01B8)	ᶚ (U+1D9A)	ƺ (U+01BA)
ʓ (U+0293)									

== apostrophe ==
ꞌ (U+A78C)	Ꞌ (U+A78B)	ʔ (U+0294)	ɂ (U+0242)	Ɂ (U+0241)	ˀ (U+02C0)	ʼ (U+02BC)	ŉ (U+0149)	ˮ (U+02EE)	ʾ (U+02BE)
ꜣ (U+A723)	Ꜣ (U+A722)	ʡ (U+02A1)	ʕ (U+0295)	ˤ (U+02E4)	ʿ (U+02BF)	ˁ (U+02C1)	ꜥ (U+A725)	Ꜥ (U+A724)	ʢ (U+02A2)
ʻ (U+02BB)	ʽ (U+02BD)	ᴥ (U+1D25)	ᵜ (U+1D5C)	ʖ (U+0296)	ᴤ (U+1D24)				

== other ==
þ (U+00FE)	Þ (U+00DE)	ꝥ (U+A765)	Ꝥ (U+A764)	ꝧ (U+A767)	Ꝧ (U+A766)
ƿ (U+01BF)	Ƿ (U+01F7)	ꝩ (U+A769)	Ꝩ (U+A768)		
ꭠ (U+AB60)	ꭡ (U+AB61)	ꭣ (U+AB63)			
ꝫ (U+A76B)	Ꝫ (U+A76A)				
ꝭ (U+A76D)	Ꝭ (U+A76C)	ꝸ (U+A778)			
ꝯ (U+A76F)	◌᷒ (U+1DD2)	Ꝯ (U+A76E)	ꝰ (U+A770)		
ꜫ (U+A72B)	Ꜫ (U+A72A)				
ꜭ (U+A72D)	Ꜭ (U+A72C)	ꜯ (U+A72F)	Ꜯ (U+A72E)		
ƨ (U+01A8)	Ƨ (U+01A7)				
ƽ (U+01BD)	Ƽ (U+01BC)				
ƅ (U+0185)	Ƅ (U+0184)				
ǀ (U+01C0)	ǁ (U+01C1)	ǂ (U+01C2)	ǃ (U+01C3)		
ƻ (U+01BB)	ʘ (U+0298)	ʭ (U+02AD)	ꞏ (U+A78F)	꞉ (U+A789)	

== See also ==
- Universal Character Set characters
- List of Latin-script letters
- Latin script in Unicode
