= USS Delegate =

Minesweeper of the United States Navy

History

United States
- Name: USS Delegate (AM-217)
- Builder: Tampa Shipbuilding Company
- Laid down: 27 December 1942
- Launched: 28 March 1943
- Commissioned: 30 April 1945
- Decommissioned: 29 May 1946
- Stricken: 29 May 1946
- Fate: Transferred to the Republic of China

History

Taiwan
- Name: ROCS Yung Ho (PF-53)
- Acquired: 29 May 1946
- Decommissioned: 1 September 1962
- Stricken: 1 September 1962
- Fate: unknown

General characteristics
- Class & type: Admirable-class minesweeper
- Displacement: 650 long tons (660 t)
- Length: 184 ft 6 in (56.24 m)
- Beam: 33 ft (10 m)
- Draft: 9 ft 9 in (2.97 m)
- Propulsion: 2 × ALCO 539 diesel engines, 1,710 shp (1,280 kW); Farrel-Birmingham single reduction gear; 2 shafts
- Speed: 15 knots (28 km/h)
- Complement: 104
- Armament: 1 × 3"/50 caliber (76 mm) DP gun; 2 × twin Bofors 40 mm guns; 1 × Hedgehog anti-submarine mortar; 2 × Depth charge tracks

Service record
- Part of: U.S. Pacific Fleet (1944-1946)
- Awards: 1 Battle star

USS Delegate (AM-217) was an Admirable-class minesweeper built for the United States Navy during World War II. She was awarded one battle star for service in the Pacific during World War II. She was decommissioned in May 1946 and turned over to the Republic of China. Named ROCS Yung Ho (PF-53) in the Republic of China Navy, she served until September 1962 when she was stricken. Her ultimate fate is not reported in secondary sources.

== Career ==
Delegate was launched 28 March 1943 by Tampa Shipbuilding Co., Inc., Tampa, Florida; sponsored by Miss L. Bourget; and commissioned 30 April 1945.

Delegate sailed from Norfolk, Virginia, 14 July 1945 and called at Guantánamo Bay, San Pedro, Pearl Harbor, Eniwetok, and Saipan before arriving at Usuki Bay, Kyūshū, 3 November as escort for two LST's. She swept mines in Tsushima Straits from 15 to 22 December, then supervised Japanese minesweepers clearing the northern Futagami minefields from 20 to 26 January 1946. Delegate arrived at Kure 6 February to provide logistics support for the YMSs engaged in widening the swept channel to that port.

Delegate left Kure, Japan, 24 February 1946 and arrived at Subic Bay, Luzon, 5 March to have her armament removed. On 8 April she sailed for Shanghai, China, arriving 5 days later. She was decommissioned and turned over to the State Department 29 May 1946 for further transfer to the Republic of China, by which she was renamed and reclassified, ROCS Yung Ho (PF-53). She was decommissioned and struck from the Republic of China Navy on 1 September 1962; her ultimate fate is not reported in secondary sources.

== Awards ==
Delegate received one battle star for World War II service.
