= Flight 217 =

Flight 217 may refer to:

Listed chronologically

- Aero Flight 217, crashed on 8 November 1963
- Pan Am Flight 217, crashed on 12 December 1968
- Aeroflot Flight 217, crashed on 13 October 1972
- Rocky Mountain Airways Flight 217, crashed on 4 December 1978
- Aeropesca Colombia Flight 217, crashed on 26 March 1982
- Azerbaijan Airlines Flight 217, crashed on 23 December 2005
