= USS ATA-217 =

Tugboat of the United States Navy

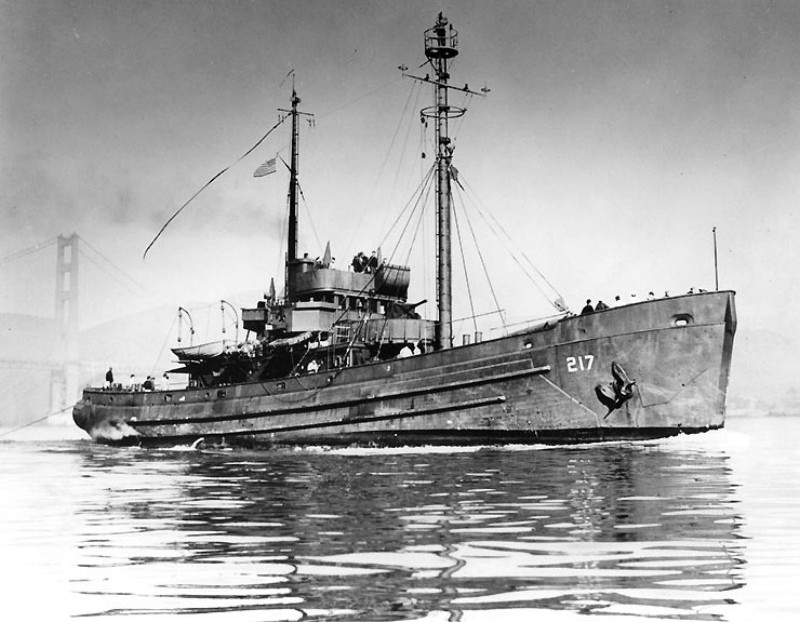

History

United States
- Name: USS Tesota
- Namesake: The tesota tree
- Ordered: as YN-95
- Builder: Canulette Shipbuilding Co., Slidell, Louisiana
- Laid down: 11 December 1943 as Tesota (YN-95)
- Launched: 29 July 1944
- Commissioned: 16 January 1945 as USS ATA-217
- Decommissioned: 7 May 1946, at Mare Island Naval Shipyard, Vallejo, California
- Reclassified: AN-71, 20 January 1944; USS ATA-217, 10 August 1944
- Stricken: 21 May 1946
- Fate: Burned off Mexico, 17 February 1949

General characteristics
- Type: Palo Blanco-class auxiliary fleet tug
- Displacement: 1,275 tons
- Length: 194 ft 6 in (59.28 m)
- Beam: 34 ft 7 in (10.54 m)
- Draft: 14 ft 1 in (4.29 m)
- Propulsion: diesel-electric, single screw, 2,500hp
- Speed: 12.1 knots
- Complement: 57 officers and enlisted
- Armament: two single 40 mm AA gun mounts

USS ATA-217 was an ATA-214-class tug of the United States Navy built near the end of World War II. Originally laid down as Tesota (YN-95), a net tender of the Ailanthus class, she was redesignated as AN-71, a net layer, before launch. Before completion, the name Tesota was cancelled and the ship was named ATA-217, an unnamed auxiliary ocean tug.

== Career ==
ATA-217 was laid down as the net tender Tesota (YN-95) on 11 December 1943 at Slidell, Louisiana, by the Canulette Shipbuilding Company; was reclassified a net laying ship and redesignated AN-71 on 20 January 1944; and was launched on 29 July 1944. However, the name Tesota was canceled on 10 August 1944, and the ship was reclassified an auxiliary ocean tug and re-designated ATA-217 on the same day. She was commissioned on 16 January 1945. Following a short shakedown cruise early in February 1945, the tug departed Norfolk, Virginia, for Hawaii and arrived at her home port, Pearl Harbor, on 1 March. After serving there for more than a year, the ship proceeded to the West Coast of the United States.

ATA-217 was decommissioned at Mare Island, California, on 7 May, and was struck from the Navy List on 21 May 1946. ATA-217 was transferred to the U.S. Maritime Commission on 25 March 1947 and was sold the same day to Martinolick Shipbuilding Co., San Francisco, California.
