= 217th Division (People's Republic of China) =

217th Division (1949–52) 3rd Water Conservancy Construction Division (1952-53) 1st Road Engineering Division (1953-55)
- Active: 1949.11 – 1955.4
- Country: People's Republic of China
- Branch: People's Liberation Army
- Type: Division
- Role: Infantry
- Part of: 53rd Corps
- Engagements: Chinese Civil War

The 217th Division (Chinese: 第217师) was created in November 1949 under the Regulation of the Redesignations of All Organizations and Units of the Army, issued by the Central Military Commission on November 1, 1948, based on the 4th and 5th Division, 2nd Corps, 1st Army Group of the People's Liberation Army of the Nationalist Party of China. Its history can be traced to the 63rd Division, 14th Corps, 1st Army Group of the Republic of China Army,which defected in August 1948.

The division is part of the 53rd Corps. Under the flag of the 217th division it took part in the Chinese Civil War.

In March 1952 the division was reorganized as the 3rd Water Conservancy Construction Division(Chinese: 水利工程建设第3师).

In July 1953 the division was further reorganized as the 1st Road Engineering Division(Chinese: 公路工程第1师).

In 1955 the division was demobilized.
