= 21700 =

21700 may refer to:

- 21,700 (number)
- 21700 (year)

== Places ==
- 21700 Caseynicole (1999 RD_{72}), a Mars-crossing asteroid, the 21700th asteroid registered
- Jalapa, Baja California, Mexico (postal code: 21700)
- Lice, Turkey (postal code: 21700)
- La Palma del Condado (postal code: 21700), Huevla, Spain
- 21700. a postal code in Côte-d'Or, Bourgogne-Franche-Comté, France; used for several communes, see Communes of the Côte-d'Or department

== Other uses ==
- 21700 battery, a cylindrical battery cell form factor for rechargeable lithium-ion batteries
- U+2170x (Unicode character block), see List of CJK Unified Ideographs Extension B (Part 2 of 7)

== See also ==
- 2170 (disambiguation)
- 217 (number)
- 217 (ISO year +217; A.D. 217 / 217 CE)
