= List of ships of the United States Army =

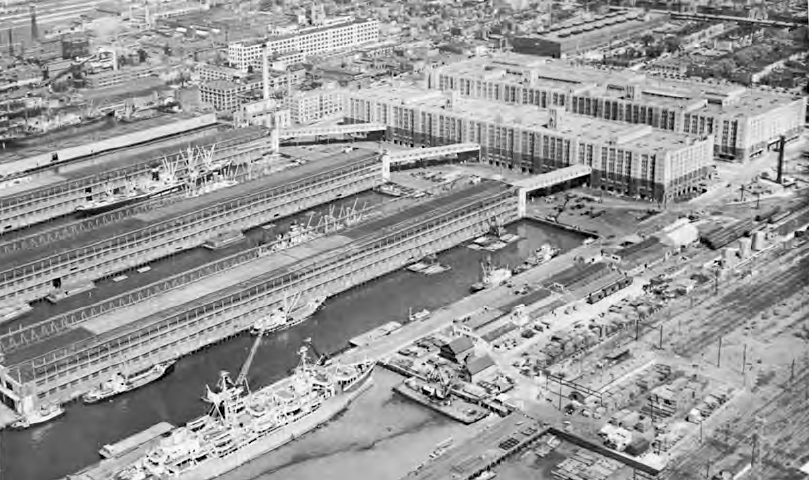
Brooklyn Army Base, New York, between the wars.

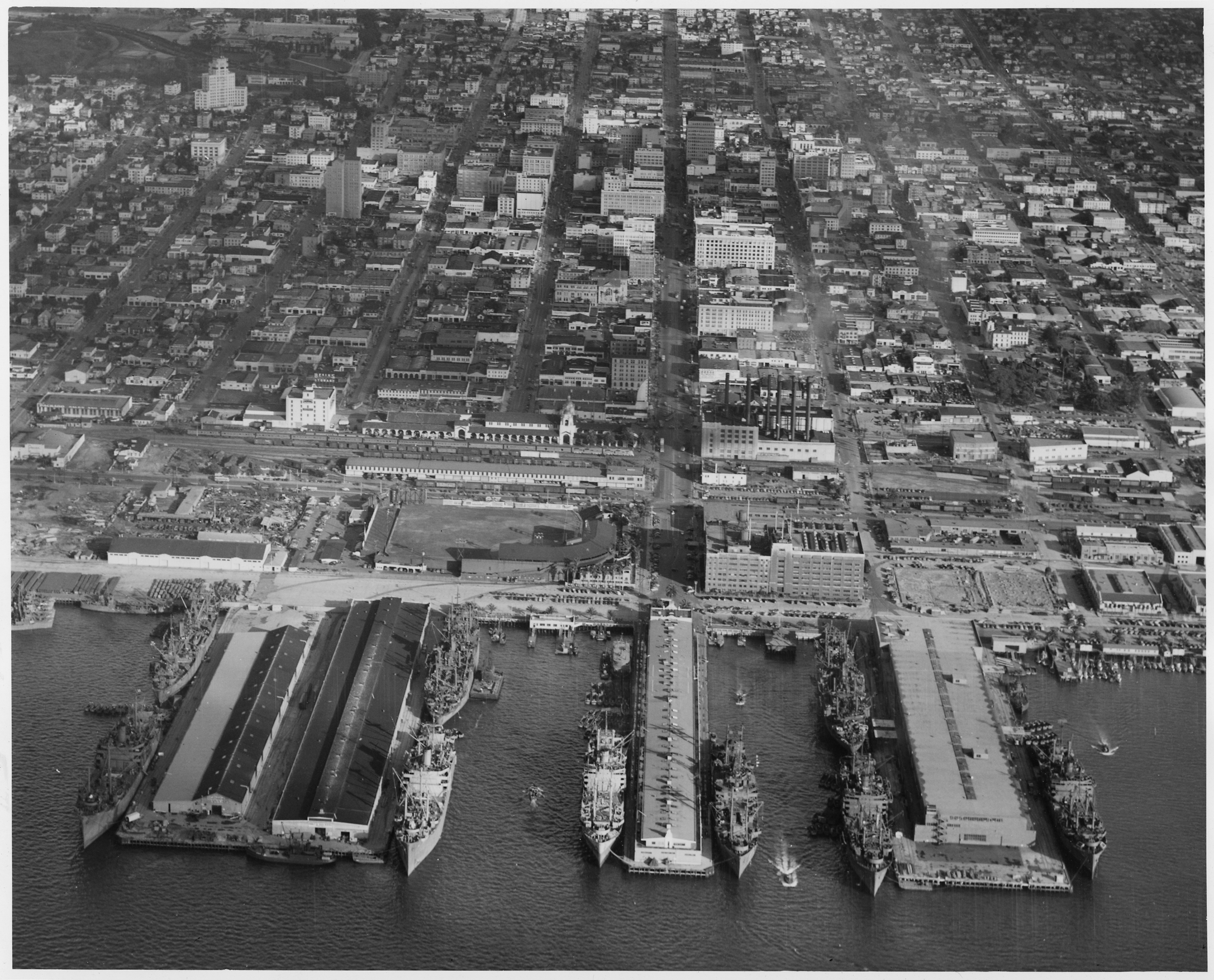
Aerial photograph of piers at headquarters and at U.S. Naval Repair Base during loading operations showing nine Army transport ships docked at the commercial wharfs at San Diego, California. (National Archives and Records Administration)

Section 3062, Title 10, U.S. Code, states that the Army includes "land combat and service forces and such aviation and water transport as may be organic therein."

Army water transport capabilities include operation of fixed port facilities, construction and emplacement of temporary ports, operation of a variety of logistics watercraft (including transport vessels, lighterage, harbor and ocean-capable tug boats), plus port clearance capabilities.

During World War II, the U.S. Army operated about 127,800 watercraft of various types. Those included large troop and cargo transport ships that were Army-owned hulls, vessels allocated by the War Shipping Administration, bareboat charters, and time charters. In addition to the transports, the Army fleet included specialized types. Those included vessels not related to transport such as mine warfare vessels, waterway or port maintenance ships, and other service craft.

For example:

- Troop and cargo ships over 1,000 gross tons that often carried the U.S. Army Transport ship prefix "USAT" with their name if they were Army owned or bareboat chartered: 1,557 ships
- Other ships over 1,000 gross tons, including hospital ships (prefix "USAHS"), cable ships, aircraft repair ships, port repair ships and others without any title other than "U.S. Army" and a number or name: 108 ships
- Vessels under 1,000 gross tons of numerous types that include the 511 FS ("Freight and Supply") small nonstandard coastal freighters of numerous designs, 361 minecraft with the large Mine Planters carrying U.S. Army Mine Planter (prefix "USAMP") with a number above a name, 4,343 tugs of all types and a varied array of 4,697 launches and small service craft just designated U.S. Army with a number or name: 12,379
- Barges and non-propelled watercraft that included 16,787 pontoons: 25,383
- Amphibious assault craft: 88,366

Limiting the number to only the named and numbered vessels, discounting the various simple barges and amphibious assault craft, the remaining number is 14,044 vessels.

== Overview ==
This fleet and the Army's Ports of Embarkation operated throughout the war's massive logistics effort in support of worldwide operations. After the war the Army's fleet began to resume its peacetime role and even regain the old colors of gray hulls, white deck houses and buff trimming, masts and booms with the red, white and blue stack rings. An example may be seen in the photographs of USAT Fred C. Ainsworth.

Some confusion may exist in the precise definition of "Army ship" as many ships saw Army service during the Second World War that were never or only briefly (a brief Army time or voyage charter) part of the Army's fleet. Army owned vessels of the core fleet are quite clear, even though some of those switched between Army and Navy during the war. Close to those were the ships that were bareboat chartered by the Army, meaning that only the hull itself was chartered and Army was responsible for crewing and all other operational aspects. Others were long term allocations to Army by the War Shipping Administration so that they operated as Army transports and cargo vessels for much of the war. The more confusing ships are those that were short-term or time or voyage chartered ships.

In the South West Pacific Area during the emergency of the Japanese advance throughout Southeast Asia the Dutch East Indies and the Philippines even the chartering arrangements were often vague as ships arriving in Australia were retained by United States Forces in Australia (USFIA) for operations in Australia. Some of these ships, acquired and operating under United States Army Services of Supply, Southwest Pacific Area (USASOS SWPA), achieved some notability in military history in daring voyages to resupply the forces cut off in the Philippines from either Australia or the already collapsing Dutch East Indies. That situation is captured by Masterson on page 324:

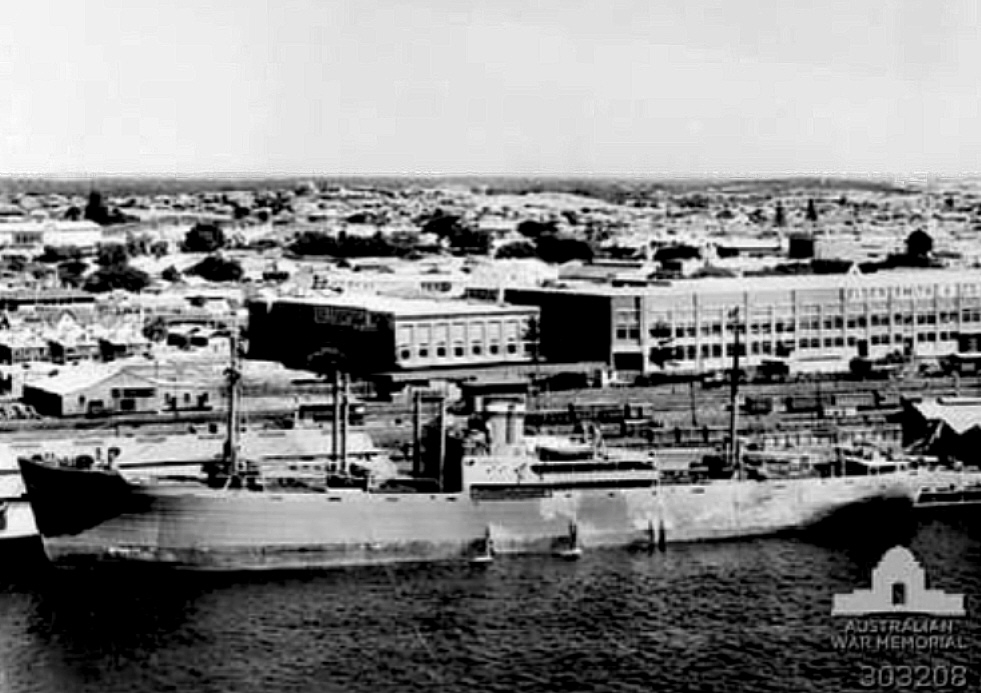
Philippine registered Dona Nati, part of "General MacArthur's fleet into 1942," one of three ships to successfully run the Japanese blockade of the Philippines.

On 28 April General MacArthur reported that his fleet consisted of twenty-eight vessels—the twenty-one KPM vessels (the majority of which had not been delivered); the Dona Nati. The Admiral Halstead, the Coast Farmer, and the MS Sea Witch, chartered by WSA; and the Anhui, the Yochow and the Hanyang, believed to be chartered by the British Ministry of War Transport (BMWT) for the U.S. Army, though no official information concerning their status had been received.

Three of those vessels, Coast Farmer, Dona Nati and Anhui, out of a number sent, managed to run the Japanese blockade of the Philippines and deliver supplies.

After the war came the reorganization that led to the U.S. Department of Defense rather than a separate United States Department of War and Department of the Navy with the decision on maritime logistics going in favor of it being administered by the Navy. As a result, the Army lost almost all of its big vessels. Many of the Army vessels were transferred to Navy with the transport types becoming components of the new Military Sea Transportation Service (MSTS, now MSC) under the Navy. Some of the Army's specialized vessels became Navy commissioned ships (USS) or non-commissioned utility vessels. Digital photographs of a few of these vessels in Army service are provided at the Naval History and Heritage Command. Others were sold commercially or simply scrapped.

The Army heritage of civilian crewed transports and cargo ships continued in the operating model for MSTS and its "in service" non-commissioned ships designated as U.S. Naval Ship (prefix "USNS"). Some Army vessels, still crewed by Army civilians just transferred, were suddenly sailing before fully taking on the new service's administrative functions and colors.

== Currently active ship classes ==
- Runnymede-class large landing craft (35 built)
- MGen. Nathanael Greene-class large coastal tugs (6 built)
- General Frank S. Besson-class logistics support vessels (8 built)
- LCM-8 Landing Craft Mechanized - (40 built)

The Army has a fleet of approximately 132 watercraft, operated by units of the U.S. Army Transportation Corps. (The Army's watercraft program is managed by the United States Army Tank-automotive and Armaments Command.) These craft are identified by the following hull code and type;

- DUKW – Six-wheel-drive amphibious truck
- JMLS – Joint Modular Lighter System
- LACV-30 – Lighter ACV 30-ton
- LAMP-H – Lighter, Amphibian - Heavy Lift
- LARC – Lighter, Amphibious, Resupply, Cargo (in 5, 15 and 60-ton versions)
- TLV – Theater Logistics Vessel
- RIB – Rapidly Installed Breakwater System
- BC – Barge, dry-cargo, nonpropelled
- BCDK – Conversion kit, barge deck enclosure
- BCL – Barge, dry-cargo, nonpropelled, large
- BD – Crane, floating
- BDL – Lighter, beach discharge
- BG – Barge, liquid cargo, nonpropelled
- BK – Barge, dry cargo, nonpropelled
- BPL – Barge, pier, nonpropelled
- BR – Barge, refrigerated, nonpropelled
- CF – Ferry, Causeway
- FB – Ferryboat
- FD – Dry dock, floating
- FMS – Repair shop, floating, nonpropelled
- FS – Freight and supply vessel, large
- J – Boat, utility
- LARC – Lighter, amphibious
- LCM – Landing craft, mechanized
- LCU – Landing craft, utility
- LSV – Logistics support vessel
- LT – Tug, large, seagoing
- MWT – Modular Warping, Tug
- ST – Tug, small, harbor
- T – Boat, passenger and cargo
- TCDF – Temporary crane discharge facility
- Y – Vessel, liquid cargo

The US Army Corps of Engineers has a total of 11 dredge vessels, divided into hopper and non-hopper dredges. In total the Corps has approximately 2,300 floating plant assets, including barges, tow boats, floating cranes, survey boats, patrol boats and dredges.

== Aircraft Repair Ship ==
=== Aircraft Repair Units (Floating) ===
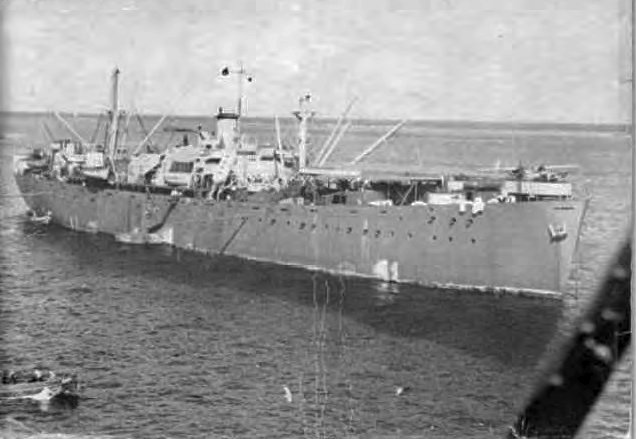
The Liberty ship Rebecca Lukens was converted into a floating machine shop, repair, and maintenance depot and rechristened as the Maj Gen Herbert A Dargue.

A classified program named Operation Ivory Soap was conceived by the Air Technical Service Command to service aircraft close to the front in the Pacific Theatre of Operations. Six Liberty ships were converted at Point Clear, Alabama, near Brookley Field, outside Mobile, Alabama. Conversion began in the spring of 1944. The ships were fitted with machine tools, cranes, and all the equipment necessary for a machine shop, including welding, radiator, tank, wood, patterns, blue print, electrical, fabric and dope, paint, air-conditioned instrument and camera shops, radio, battery, propeller, tires and fuel cells, armament and turrets, plating, radar, carburetor, and turbo-super-charger. They were supplied with a large inventory of steel, sheet metal, lumber, aluminum, and other materials to manufacture needed parts. Each ship was also provided with two motor launches and two DUKWs or "ducks", amphibious trucks for carrying parts too heavy for the helicopters. Two personnel were trained as divers. Each was equipped with a 40 by 72 feet (12 m × 22 m) steel deck to support helicopter operations. Each ship was assigned a complement of 344 soldiers who were trained for marine operations. Nicknamed sailjers, They wore sailor dungarees on the ship, and Army uniforms on land.

The ships were designated as Aircraft Repair Units, Floating (ARUs) and operated by the Army Transport Service, all of whose officers and men were merchant mariners. The ships provided mobile depot support for B-29 Superfortress and P-51 Mustangs based on Guam, Iwo Jima, and Okinawa beginning in December 1944. They were also fitted with landing platforms to accommodate four R-4 helicopters, creating the first seagoing helicopter-equipped ships, and provided medical evacuation of combat casualties in both the Philippines and Okinawa.

- 1st ARU(F) Major General Robert Olds (ex-SS Daniel E. Garrett)
- 2d ARU(F) Major General Herbert A. Dargue (ex-SS Rebecca Lukens)
- 3rd ARU(F) Major General Walter R. Weaver (ex-SS Thomas LeValley)
- 4th ARU(F) Brigadier General Asa N. Duncan (ex-SS Richard O'Brien)
- 5th ARU(F) Brigadier General Clinton W. Russell (ex-SS Robert W. Bingham
- 6th ARU(F) Brigadier General Alfred J. Lyon (ex-SS SS Nathaniel Scudder)

=== Auxiliary Aircraft Repair Ship ===
- Design 427: Vessel, Supply, Aircraft Repair, Diesel, Steel, 180-foot 573 ton steel vessels built by Higgins;
- FS-204 Col. Clifford P. Bradley
- FS-205 Col. Richard E. Cobb
- FS-206 Col. John D. Corkille (#1) and (#2)
- FS-207 Col. Demas T. Craw
- FS-208 Col. Everett S. Davis
- FS-209 Col. Sam L. Ellis
- FS-210 Col. Oliver S. Ferson
- FS-211 Col. Percival E. Gabel
- FS-212 Col. Donald M. Keiser
- FS-213 Col. Douglas M. Kilpatrick
- FS-214 Col. Raymond T. Lester
- FS-215 Col. Donald R. Lyon
- FS-216 Col. William J. McKiernan
- FS-217 Col. Armand Peterson (went to the Navy as USS Palm Beach (AGER-3))
- FS-218 Col. Charles T. Phillips
- FS-219 Col. Edgar R. Todd
- FS-220 Col. Harold B. Wright
- FS-221 Col. Francis T. Ziegler

== Seacraft Repair Ship ==
Six ships, allocated by the War Shipping Administration, were converted to repair and spare parts ships. Five, from 350 ft (110 m) to 390 ft (120 m) in length, were built on the Great Lakes from 1901 to 1913. The sixth, James B. Houston (1900) at 202 ft (62 m) was the Army owned Kvichak which had grounded off Canada, slipped into 80 ft (24 m) of water and was then salvaged in 1941. All were U.S. Coast Guard-crewed with the Army in administrative and operational control as well as providing the repair detachments from the Army Marine Ship Repair Company (AMSR CO.). All served in the Southwest Pacific Area. Houston, which had first served in the Aleutians, was declared surplus while at Mariveles, Philippines and turned over to the Foreign Liquidation Commission in February 1946, reverted to U. S. Army Forces, Western Pacific (AFWESPAC) in April 1946, but was not used as a repair ship after being declared surplus.

Army Marine Ship Repair Company (T/O & E 55-47):
This is a mobile maintenance and repair unit capable of traveling from installation to installation in a theater to perform third and minor fourth echelon maintenance and repairs to small boats, harbor craft, floating equipment, and in some cases repairs to larger vessels. The company is equipped with an especially converted ship or barge, fully equipped with machine, electric, engine, wood-working, rigging and paint shops.

See "The Forgotten Voyage of the USARS Duluth: Recalling a Coast Guard-Manned Vessel That Fell Through the Cracks of World War II History" for one of the few descriptions of these vessels in service. The embarked Army repair units, where noted below, are from Masterson":

- USARS James B. Houston (1900), part of 803d AMSR Co.
- USARS W. J. Conners (1901), 804th AMSR Co.
- USARS William F. Fitch (1902), first in SWPA, 801st AMSR Co.
- USARS Duluth (1903), 802d AMSR Co.
- USARS J. E. Gorman (1909), 803d AMSR Co.
- USARS J. M. Davis (1913), 805th AMSR Co.

=== Other repair vessels ===
- Koondooloo 524 grt, 191.7 feet (58.4 m) X 35.7 feet (10.9 m) X 14.8 feet (4.5 m): Acquired for Southwest Pacific Area permanent local fleet, Small Ship Section, a double ended vehicular ferry built in Scotland in 1924 for Sydney Ferries Limited and converted in 1937 into a show/excursion boat with dance floor and 1,700 passenger capacity. Converted by the Army from coal to oil and fitted with a 30-ton boom, Koondooloo (S-181) was used as a workboat in New Guinea servicing amphibious vehicles and vessels. Reconverted to a vehicular ferry 1951 and wrecked while under tow to Philippines in 1972.
- "Half Rufus" was the bow of the Liberty ship Rufus King which ran aground on Moreton Island, Queensland, Australia. The ship had broken in two with the bow salvaged by the Commonwealth Marine Salvage Board, taken over by the U.S. Army Small Ships Section and equipped with vertical boiler for power, a machine shop used for repairing vessels and bunkers for coal and fuel oil for refueling them. Given the number S-129 and dubbed "Half Rufus" the salvaged bow was towed to Milne Bay, arriving 21 June 1944, and then to Finschhafen where repair equipment was transferred to a barge in April 1945 and the bow section then used as a coal hulk.

== Depot Ship ==
Seven cargo vessels were converted to spare parts depot ships to facilitate the maintenance of military equipment in oversea areas.

The 20 dry cargo barges originally intended for bauxite were taken by the Army and 17 were used in the southwest Pacific for storehouses. Of the 24 steam cargo concrete vessels, 17 were converted by the Army into floating storehouses, 5 were used by the Army as training ships and 2 found an honorable end when sunk to form part of the breakwater protecting the American landing in Normandy at Omaha beach.
A. D. Kahn, "Concrete Ship and Barge Program, 1941-1944"
Ships for victory: a history of shipbuilding under the U.S. Maritime Commission in World War II

Concrete ship

- 265-foot BCL (barge, concrete, large) Type B Concrete Barge
- 5 Builders of Concrete Ships
- Design MC B7-D1, 2 ships for US Army
- World War II in the Pacific Concrete Ships
- Concrete Ship hulks
- 22 covered lighters (Army floating stores warehouse or BCL), 265 feet, used by Army as floating warehouses.
- 3 lighters used as refrigerated warehouses.
- 2 Army repair ships (Army repair ship or FMS).
- Floating Marine Repair Shop

== Small Ships ==
The Army had its own program for small boat construction and directly procured vessels and water craft that were under 200 feet or under 1,000 gross tons.

Army F-ships (100-dwt) were little freighters built on the lines of a Dutch wooden shoe and had a capacity of about 100 tons with a maximum speed of 8 knots. During the war these little ships plied back and forth between Navy PT boat bases, Crash Rescue Boat bases, and Engineer Special Brigade bases in the Pacific for the purpose of transporting personnel, hauling supplies and cargo, or occasionally for towing fuel barges and water craft, to bases along the coasts or to nearby islands.

- Design 216 (Boat, Supply, Diesel, Steel, 99')
- Design 225 (Boat, Supply, Ice-Breaker, Diesel, Steel, 102'), Three design number 225 vessels were built by Equitable Equipment Company in New Orleans, Louisiana in 1942, they most likely operated in Alaska or in Greenland waters.

=== Retrieving Vessel ===
Eleven of these small ships were built for the U.S. Army Air Corps/Army Air Forces in late 1942 through mid 1943. The official designation was "Design No. 210, 150 Foot Steel Diesel Retrieving Vessel", sometimes termed "Aircraft Retrieving Vessel" in later references. Name format was "U.S. Army" over "H.A.# NAME" as indicated by a builder's model. Dimensions were 158' 3" LOA × 32' beam (moulded) at deck × 8' draft powered by two 300 hp diesels, and was equipped with a 30-ton jumbo lift boom along with regular cargo booms and had a cargo capacity of 500 measurement tons. These vessels were primarily used as supply ships, that could retrieve aircraft if needed.

- H.A. 2 Morrow
- H.A. 3 Van Nostrand
- H.A. 4 Miller
- H.A. 5 Beck
- H.A. 6 Colgan
- H.A. 7 Chandler
- H.A. 8 Bane
- H.A. 9 Bower
- H.A. 10 Stone
- H.A. 11 (unknown)
- H.A. 12 (unknown)

=== Schooners ===
SWPA CP Fleet, Army CS ships provided communications relays and acted as command posts (CP) for forward elements ashore. CSM (Maintenance) ships, in addition to acting as CS ships, were also equipped for radio repair operations to supply floating maintenance. CSQ (Quarters) ships acted as floating dormitories. CSN (News) ships were used by civilian reporters.

- Wawona
- C.A. Thayer
- Coringle (S-31)
- Tuhoe (S-132)
- Argosy Lemal (S-6)
- Harold (S-58, CS-3)
- Geoanna (IX-61, TP-249, S-382, CS-1)
- Volador (IX-59, TP-248, S-385, CSM-1)

== Cable laying ships ==
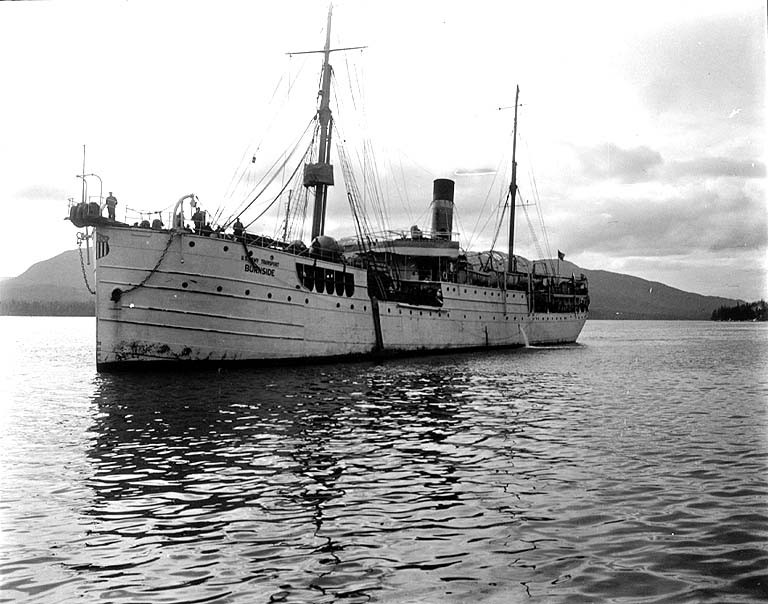
Cable ship Burnside in Ketchikan, Alaska, June 1911.

The Army had a history of submarine cable work by the time of World War II operations, dating back to the 1899-1900 period. Much of this work had been in relation to communications with far flung Army forces in the Philippines and Alaska. The Army Signal Corps used a number of cable ships for that work including Burnside, Romulus, Liscum, Dellwood and two vessels intimately associated with the Coast Artillery Corps controlled mine work at the coastal fortifications; Cyrus W. Field and Joseph Henry. That cable laying capability had been allowed to deteriorate to the point that the Army had to charter the C.S. Restorer in 1941.

The Army entered the field of undersea cable work in connecting the military installations in the Philippine Islands. The transport Hooker was fitted as a cable ship for Philippine service arriving in Manila from New York 26 June 1899. On 11 August, on the way to Hong Kong for coaling, Hooker ran aground and became a total loss. Most of the cable was saved. The transport Burnside was fitted as a cable transport and layer for the Philippines with three cable tanks capable of storing 550 nmi (630 mi; 1,020 km) of cable.

As with other cable work, some vessels were chartered. For example, the vessel Orizaba (not the later Army owned vessel of the same name) was under Army charter from the Pacific Coast Steamship Company before being lost in 1900. The first ship supplied by the Quartermaster Corps to the Signal Corps for cable work was the U. S. Army Transport Burnside. That Spanish–American War prize was replaced by the larger Dellwood for work with Alaskan cables.

There is some confusion on ship designators within even official records. The conventional commercial and nautical term for such ships was "CS (name)" for "Cable Ship". The mix of USAT, CS and even the simple "Steam Ship" (SS), as seen in postwar construction of the SS William H. G. Bullard, later the USS/USNS Neptune, can be somewhat confusing. All three terms are found in official usage. For example, Smithsonian Institution library records clearly show some of these Army ships as CS Dellwood and CS Silverado. Army ship management lay in the Quartermaster Corps and later the Transportation Corps. Technical management of the cable ships was under Signal Corps and the entire enterprise of undersea cable work was the very specialized realm of several large communications corporations which operated their own cable vessels and provided experts in handling cable equipment and cable. Each appears to have used familiar terms when noting the ships in records as seen in the Quartermaster reference, and records elsewhere.

The nature of the work is such that specialized crews are required to operate the cable machinery and perform the actual cable splicing and technical work. The ex-Coast Artillery ships involved in mine planting were military crewed. CS Restorer was under charter and used civilians, many from its commercial crew, under Army contract. The remaining ships were probably mixed crews.

Eleven Transportation Corps ships under technical management of Signal Corps are known to have been active in WW II and after:

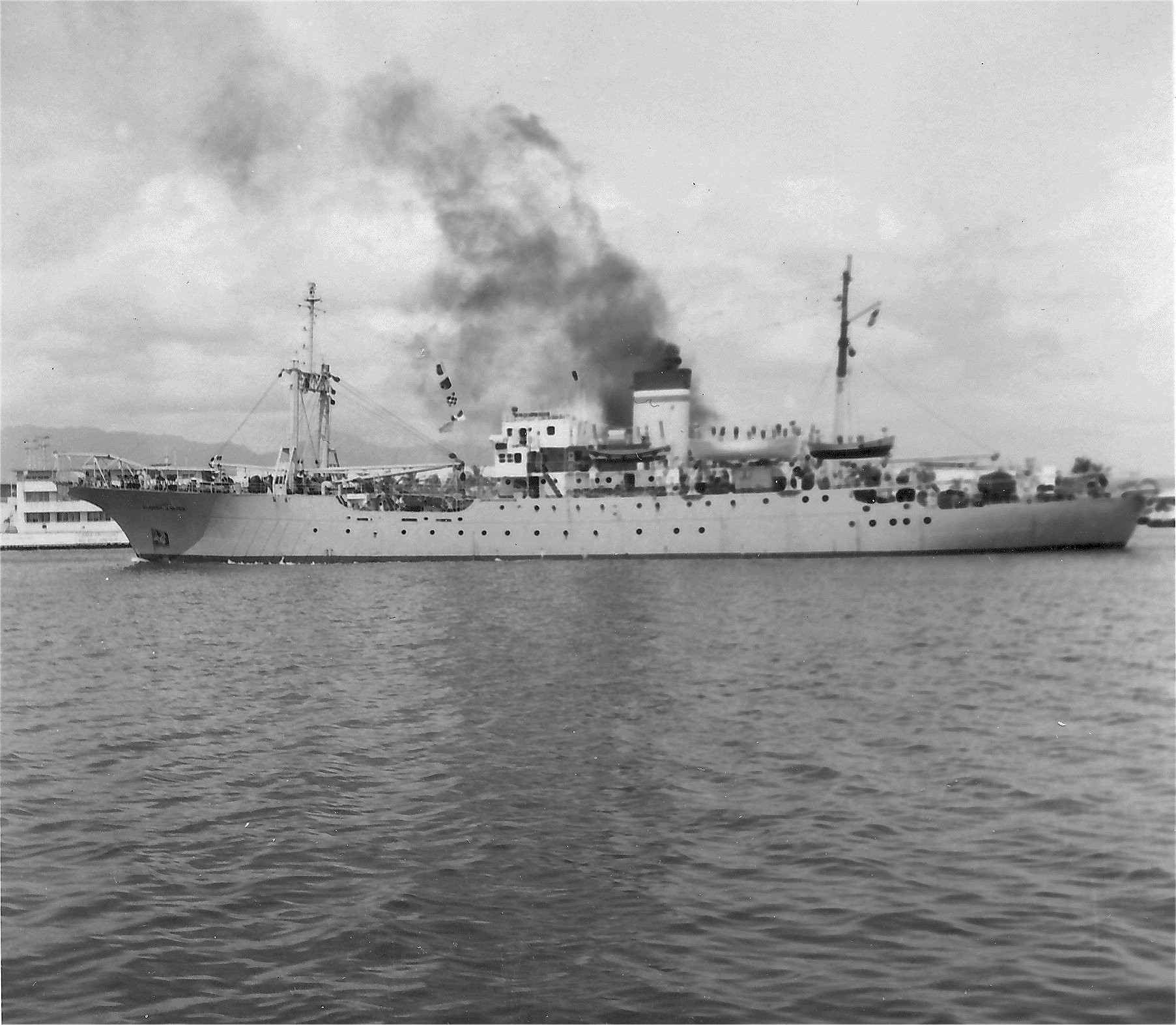
U.S. Army Cable Ship Albert J. Myer (ca 1960).

- USACS Albert J. Myer
- Basil O. Lenoir (BSP – Self Propelled Barge)
- Brico (ex-fishing vessel turned cable barge)
- Col. William A. Glassford (BSP – Self Propelled Barge) – (Later USS Nashawena (AG-142))
- Dellwood
- Gen. Samuel M. Mills (1942 Mine Planter)
- Joseph Henry (Associated with Coast Artillery Corps mine work)
- Lt. Col. Ellery W. Niles (1937 Mine Planter)
- William Bullard
- Restorer (Commercial Cable Ship under Army charter)
- Silverado

== U.S. Army Engineer Port Repair Ship ==
Ten ships, nine being Maritime Commission type N3-M-A1 cargo vessel hulls being built at Penn Jersey Shipbuilding for the U.S. Navy or Lend Lease, were transferred to the Army for operation as Engineer Port Repair Ships. The other ship, first obtained for the purpose, was a commercial ship allocated by the War Shipping Administration (WSA). All the ships were managed and crewed by Army Engineers organized into Engineer Port Repair Ship Crew units, named for Army Engineers killed in action during WW II and heavily modified from their original design.

- Junior N. Van Noy (converted from Josephine Lawrence of WWI vintage)

N3-M-A1 types:

- Arthur C. Ely
- Joe C. Specker
- Robert M. Emery
- Richard R. Arnold
- Thomas F. Farrell Jr.
- Marvin Lyle Thomas
- Henry Wright Hurley
- Glenn Gerald Griswold
- Madison Jordan Manchester

== Corps of Engineers Dredge Vessels ==
Some of these were substantial vessels, 300 feet long, with a 3,000-ton displacement and a crew complement of 60-plus men. They were seagoing diesel-electric hydraulic dredging vessels, normally functioning under the Army Corps of Engineers control, and used for maintaining and improving the coastal and harbor channels around the U.S. coasts.

- Bear (snagboat)
- Montgomery (snagboat)
- Seizer (snagboat)
- Sergeant Floyd (towboat)
- William M. Black (dredge)
- WT Preston (snagboat)
- Yuba (snagboat)

During World War II, five seagoing hopper dredges already in civil service, were fitted with 3-inch deck guns and 20-millimeter antiaircraft guns. Four were sent to the ETO and last one, Hains, was sent to the Asiatic-Pacific Theater of Operations (PTO), along with the cutter dredge 'Raymond', additionally four new Hains-class armed dredges were constructed for use in the PTO.

- Chester Harding (dredge)
- William T. Rossell (dredge)
- William L. Marshall (dredge)

Hains-class hopper dredge

- Hains (1942)
- Hoffman (1942)
- Hyde (1945)
- Barth (1945)
- Lyman (1945)
- Davidson (1945)

Towed cutter dredge

- Raymond (1926)

== Mine Planters ==
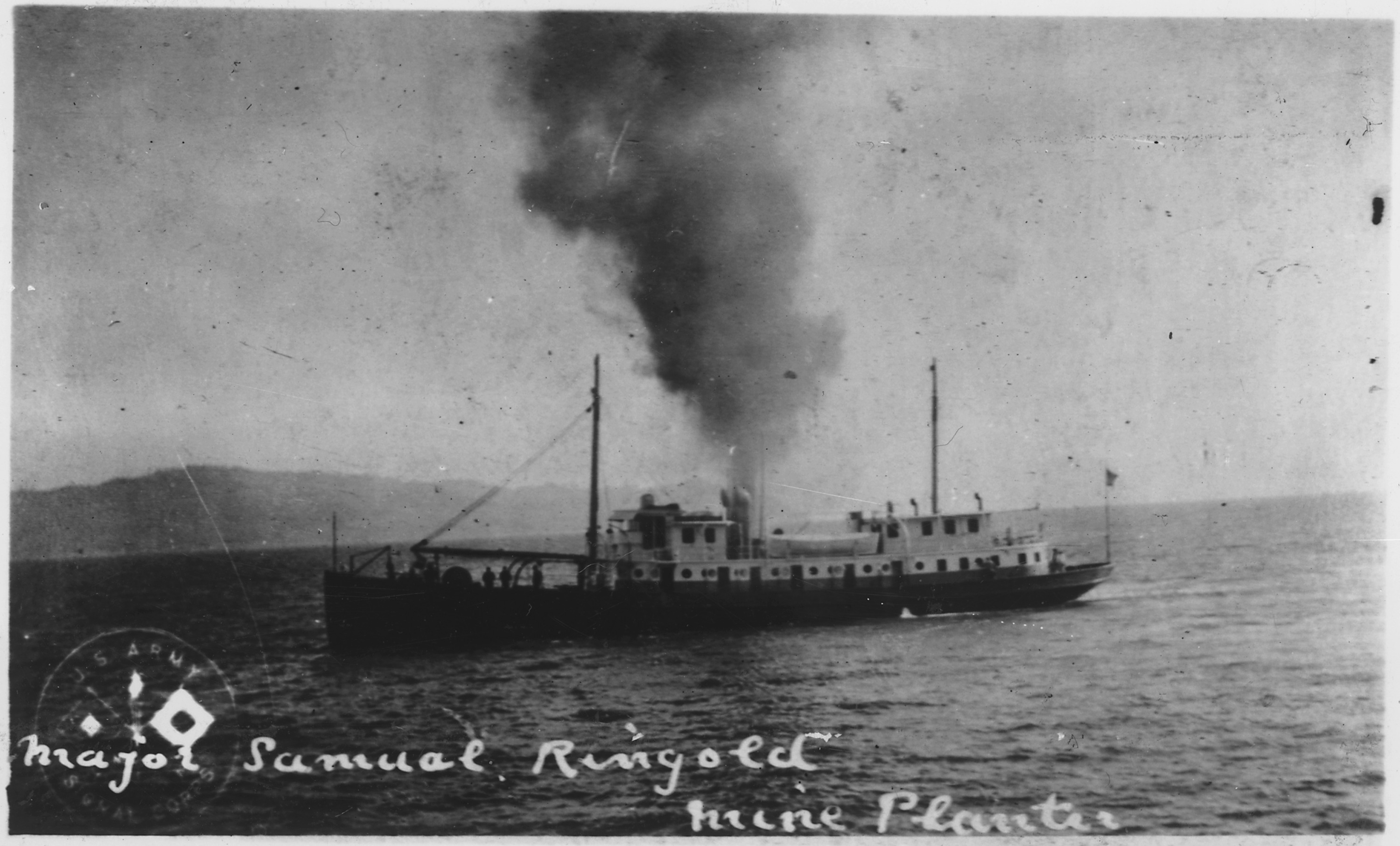
USAMP Major Samuel Ringgold, built in 1904. (National Archives and Records Administration)

The U.S. Army Mine Planter Service (AMPS), under the Coast Artillery Corps, operated ships designated as U.S. Army Mine Planter (USAMP) to 'plant' the controlled mines guarding approaches to coastal fortifications. Numerous smaller vessels, not designated as USAMP, worked with the planters in a mine flotilla.

Mine Planters & Associated Ships 1904-1909;

- Col. George Armistead (1904)
- Cyrus W. Field (1904) ^{[A]}
- Col. Henry J. Hunt (1904)
- Gen. Henry Knox (1904)
- Maj. Samuel Ringgold (1904)
- Gen. Royal T. Frank (1909)
- Joseph Henry (1909) ^{[A]}
- Gen. Samuel M. Mills (1909)
- Gen. E. O. C. Ord (1909)
- Gen. John M. Schofield (1909)

Mine Planters 1917-1919;

- Gen. William M. Graham (1917)
- Col. George F. E. Harrison (1919)
- Gen. Absalom Baird (1919)
- Gen. J. Franklin Bell / Brig. Gen. John J. Hayden (1919)
- Brig. Gen. Edmund Kirby (1919)
- Gen. Wallace F. Randolph (1919)
- Gen. John P. Story (1919)
- Col. Albert Todd (1919)
- Col. Garland N. Whistler (1919)
- Col. John V. White (1919)

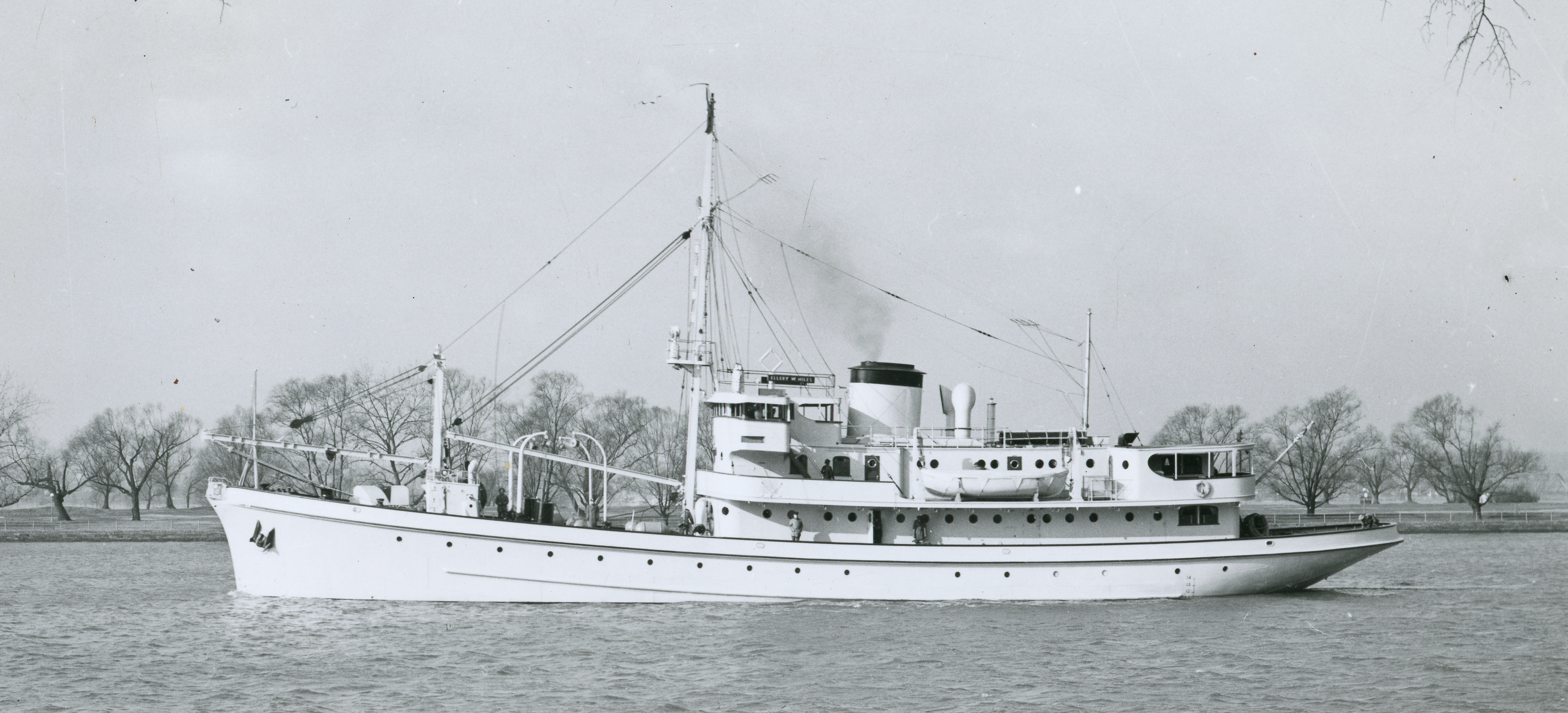
U.S. Army Mine Planter, Ellery W. Niles, Enroute Down the Potomac to Fort Monroe, Virginia (National Archives: Records of the Office of the Chief Signal Officer)

Mine Planters 1937;

- Lt. Col. Ellery W. Niles (1937)

Numbered Mine Planters 1942-1943;

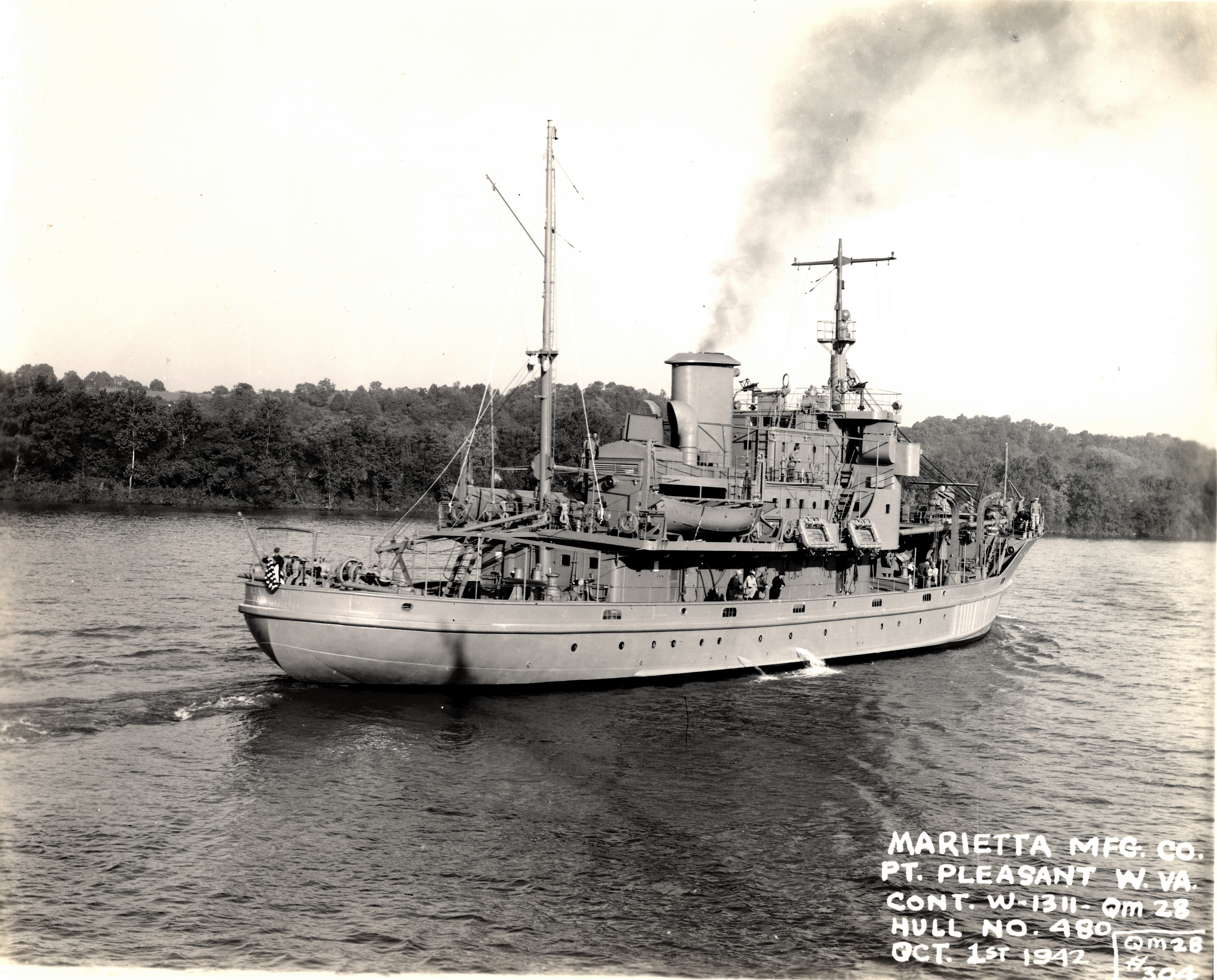
USAMP MP-7 Major General Wallace F. Randolph.)

- USAMP General Henry Knox (MP-1) (1942)
- USAMP Colonel Henry J. Hunt (MP-2) (1942)
- USAMP Colonel George Armistead (MP-3) (1942)
- Gen. Samuel M. Mills (MP-4) (1942)
- USAMP 1st Lt. William G. Sylvester (MP-5) (1942)
- Brig. Gen. Henry L. Abbott (MP-6) (1942)
- USAMP Major General Wallace F. Randolph (MP-7) (1942)
- USAMP Colonel John Storey (MP-8) (1942)
- Maj. Gen. Arthur Murray (MP-9) (1942)
- Maj. Gen. Erasmus Weaver (MP-10) (1942)
- Maj. Samuel Ringgold (MP-11) (1942)
- Brig. Gen. Royal T. Frank (MP-12) (1943)
- Col. Alfred A. Maybach (MP-13) (1943)
- Col. Horace F. Spurgin (MP-14) (1943)
- Col. Charles W. Bundy (MP-15) (1943)
- Col. George Ricker (MP-16) (1943)

Note

^{[A]}Cyrus W. Field was a Signal Corps ship closely associated with mine cable work and sometimes listed with the planters. Joseph Henry was a cable ship transferred to the Coast Artillery Corps. Both were associated with the next generation of mine planter development that incorporated some cable capability into the 1909 and 1917 ships.

=== Junior Mine Planters ===
Smaller vessels known as, "junior mine planters", or "pup planters", were occasionally employed as mine planters, but for the most part they served as freight and passenger boats for river and harbor duty. One source states the Army had 30 junior mine planters by 1919.

Junior Mine Planters 1904–1909

- JMP Major Evan Thomas (1904)
- JMP Lt. George M. Harris (1905)
- JMP General Robert Swartwout (1905)
- JMP Major Albert G. Forse (1907)
- JMP Capt. T.W. Morrison (1907)
- JMP Capt. Charles W. Rowell (1907)
- JMP Capt. A.M. Wetherill (1907)
- JMP General Richard Arnold (1909) (sunk by a storm 1942)
- JMP General Romeyn B. Ayres (1909)
- JMP Capt. Gregory Barrett (1909)
- JMP General John M. Brannan (1909)
- JMP General Harvey Brown (1909)
- JMP Capt. Joseph Furnace (1909)
- JMP General G.W. Getty (1909)
- JMP General A.M. Randol (1909)

Junior Mine Planters 1919-1921

- JMP Capt. Edwin C. Long (1919)
- JMP Capt. Fred L. Perry (1919)
- JMP Colonel Card (1920)
- JMP Capt. Samuel C. Cardwell (1920)
- JMP Colonel Clayton (1920)
- JMP Colonel Pond (1920)
- JMP General Rochester (1920)
- JMP Major Clarence M. Condon (1921)
- JMP Lt. Harold B. Douglas (1921)
- JMP Lt. Col. Robert C. Gildart (1921)
- JMP Major Albert G. Jenkins (1921)
- JMP Major Carl A. Lohr (1921)
- JMP Capt. John W. McKie (1921)
- JMP Major Lester M. Moreton (1921)
- JMP Capt. Edward P. Nones (1921)
- JMP Major William P. Pence (1921)
- JMP Lt. Col. Herbert M. Schumm (1921)

Junior Mine Planters 1930-1945

- JMP Neptune (1930)
- JMP Lt. Col. M.N. Greeley
- U.S. Army "FS-63"
- U.S. Army "FS-64"
- JMP-70 (1943) (converted from FS-70 prior to launch)

== FS (freight and supply vessels) ==
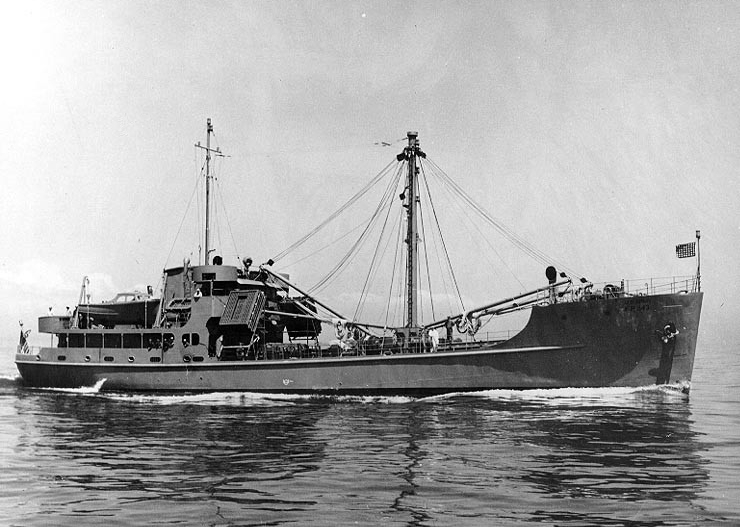
U.S. Army Cargo Vessel FP-343 ("FP" later changed to "FS"), a "Design 381" (Vessel, Supply, Diesel, Steel, 177'), was later to become Navy's T-AKL-34.

Prior to World War II the Army operated a number of passenger and freight vessels for local transport between installations located on water. These were operated by the Quartermaster Corps. During World War I they were often used to transport troops from training camps to embarkation piers, particularly at the New York Port of Embarkation. For example, the 1918 registry, Merchant Vessels of the United States, under its Quartermaster vessels section lists some 33 small passenger and freight steamers, many former commercial vessels, ranging from the 72.1 ft (22.0 m) Peterson to the 185 ft (56.4 m) El Aguila. Among those in the 1918 register were Major L'Enfant, a steamer that served on the Potomac and burned in Baltimore on 3 December 1919 and General Meigs, a Quartermaster Corps passenger and freight steamer built in 1892 by John H. Dialogue & Son, Camden New Jersey, and serving in the early 20th century with a name given to much larger ships later.

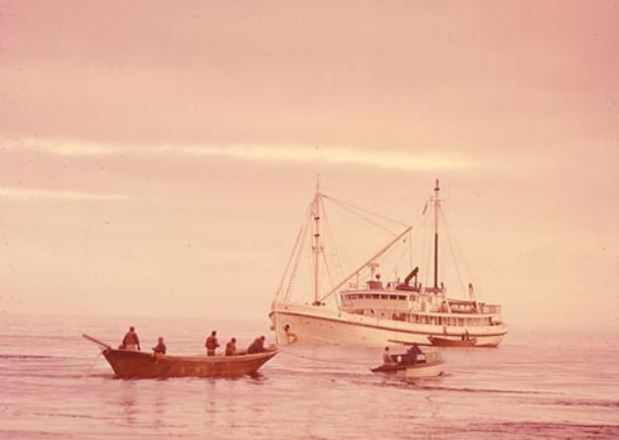
Two of the fifteen Design 342, 148' wooden vessels went to the U.S. Fish and Wildlife Service. Here Penguin II, ex FS-246, is at anchor in the Bering Sea off the Pribilof Islands in 1961.

A class of small coastal and inter-island freighters during World War II were first designated "FP" for "freight and passenger" with early acquisitions being a variety of commercial hulls. Early in the war a number of designs were inaugurated. Some, such as "Design 277" (Vessel, Passenger-Cargo, Diesel, Wood, 114') were wooden hull while the "classic" "Design 381" (Vessel, Supply, Diesel, Steel, 177') was a miniature steel cargo vessel with two hatches and central booms. Only fifteen of the larger wooden vessels, Design 342 (Vessel, Passenger-Cargo, Diesel, Wood, 148'), were built to serve largely in the Pacific Northwest and Alaska. These, as with all the smaller Army ships, were simply designated "U.S. Army name (number)", and not designated U.S. Army Transport (USAT). They were operated by Transportation Corps with a variety of crewing schemes. A few were all military, many were civilian crewed and a large number were U.S. Coast Guard crewed. The USCG crewed vessels have more Army history preserved than most of these little ships.

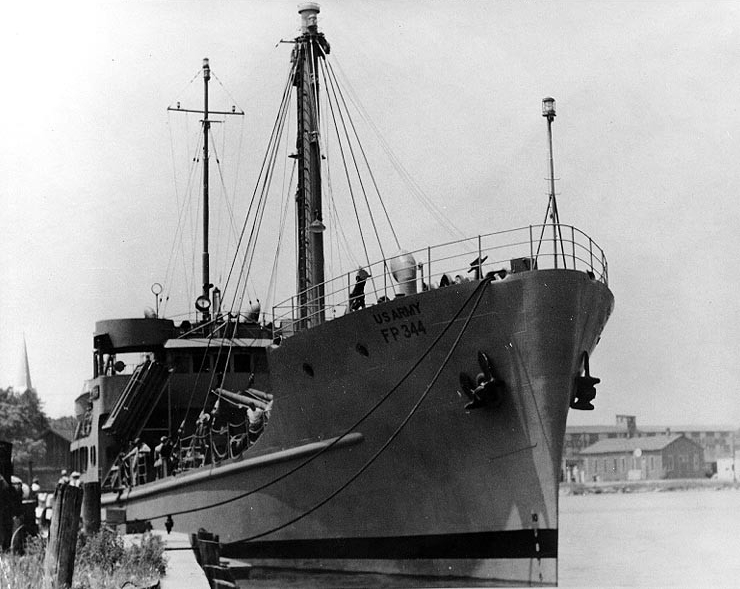
U.S. Army Cargo Vessel FP-344 (redesignated FS-344). Transferred to the Navy in 1966, she became USS Pueblo (AGER-2).

- U.S. Army FS-99 (The Catalina Island ferry Catalina 25 August 1942—22 April 1946)
- U.S. Army FS-214
- U.S. Army FS-217
- U.S. Army FS-237/Atkins (USC&GS Explorer (1904) acquired 1941 for survey work with United States Army Corps of Engineers.)
- U.S. Army FS-244/Lt. Walter J. Will
- U.S. Army FS-246/Lt. Raymond Zussman
- U.S. Army FS-255
- U.S. Army FS-256
- U.S. Army FS-257
- U.S. Army FS-263
- U.S. Army FS-267
- U.S. Army FS-274
- U.S. Army FS-275
- U.S. Army FS-278
- U.S. Army FS-282
- U.S. Army FS-287
- U.S. Army FS-288
- U.S. Army FS-289
- U.S. Army FS-316
- U.S. Army FS-343
- U.S. Army FS-344
- U.S. Army FS-345
- U.S. Army FS-347
- U.S. Army FS-361
- U.S. Army FS-370
- U.S. Army FS-371
- U.S. Army FS-385
- U.S. Army FS-391
- U.S. Army FS-394
- U.S. Army FS-395
- U.S. Army FS-396
- U.S. Army FS-400
- U.S. Army FS-407
- U.S. Army FS-411
- U.S. Army FS-524
- U.S. Army FS-539
- U.S. Army FS-551
- U.S. Army FS-751
- For reference above see the comprehensive list in Grover's print book U.S. Army Ships and Watercraft of World War II chapter "Coastal Freighters and Passenger Vessels" (pages 74–89) and the builders list "U.S. Army Coastal Freighters (F, FS) Built During WWII" at ShipbuildingHistory. The last only covers the acquired commercial hulls as "Converted merchant vessels" with no details.

A number of vessels were operated by the Army as small coastal freighters and passenger vessels without being formally given FP/FS numbers. These included:

- Belle of Portugal (also served USN as "YP-321")
- Southern Seas

Some vessels were acquired postwar, including:

- U.S. Army FSR-791 ("FSR" indicated a refrigerated freight and supply vessel)

== Hospital ships ==
- Mactan, an 1898 Newcastle built 312 foot long oil fired passenger/cargo vessel, was the first officially designated hospital ship in the Southwest Pacific and made a single voyage in that role evacuating severely wounded patients, nurses, students and other passengers from Manila, Philippines to Brisbane, Australia.
- Two Dutch vessels, Maetsuycker and Tasman, serving in the Southwest Pacific Area were operationally controlled by the U.S. Army but were certified as hospital ships by the Netherlands, maintained Dutch registry and flag. These ships have also sometimes mistakenly been shown as Australian hospital ships due to their close association with evacuating Australian troops.
- USAHS Acadia
- USAHS Aleda E. Lutz
- USAHS Algonquin
- USAHS Blanche F. Sigman
- USAHS Charles A. Stafford
- USAHS Chateau Thierry
- USAHS Comfort, aka US Navy AH-6
- USAHS Dogwood
- USAHS Emily H. M. Weder
- USAHS Ernest Hinds
- USAHS Ernestine Koranda
- USAHS Frances Y. Slanger (ex-Italian liner Saturnia)
- USAHS Hope, aka US Navy AH-7
- USAHS Jarrett M. Huddleston
- USAHS Jasmine
- USAHS John J. Meany
- USAHS John L. Clem
- USAHS Larkspur
- USAHS Louis A. Milne
- USAHS Marigold
- USAHS Mercy, aka US Navy AH-8
- USAHS Poppy
- USAHS Relief
- USAHS Republic
- USAHS Seminole
- USAHS Shamrock
- USAHS St. Mihiel
- USAHS St. Olaf
- USAHS Thistle
- USAHS Wisteria

== Transport ships ==
This is a partial list of ships in Army service under one of the following arrangements:

- Army owned
- Under bareboat charter (Army management of all operational aspects including crewing)
- Allocated by the War Shipping Administration (WSA) for varying periods with commercial crews
- Under a charter of the time or voyage type to Army with normal commercial crews

Ships known to fall in each of these categories appear in the list below. In general only ships owned, under long term bareboat charter or allocation to the Army, first through the Quartermaster Corps and later the Transportation Corps, were formally designated as a U.S. Army Transport (USAT). Those under other arrangements continued operating as SS NAME. Essentially all maritime commercial cargo and passenger type vessels were under strict control of WSA under Executive Order No. 9054. Exempted from WSA control were combatants, vessels owned by Army or Navy and coastal and inland vessels.

The FS numbered vessels and Army tugs do not normally have "USAT" in their names. They and other smaller Army craft were simply designated as Army with "U.S. Army" over the number.

=== A ===
Note: "Admiral' and "General" transports were P2 transport design variants, not an indicator of service affiliation. All the Navy's "Admiral" ships were transferred to the Army post war and were then renamed for generals. Those are found below under their Army names.

- USAT Acadia
- USAT Aconcagua (See CSAV History)
- USAT Acorn Knot
- USAT Agwileon
- USAT Alamo
- USAT Albert M. Boe
- USAT Alchibr
- USAT Algonquin
- USAT America
- USAT American Legion
- USAT Amphion
- USAT Ancon
- USAT Antilles
- USAT Arcata
- USAT Arrow
- USAT Atlantic Trader

=== B ===
- USAT Barbara C.
- USAT Belle Isle
- USAT Black Hawk
- USAT Blanche F. Sigman
- USAT Blue Jacket
- USAT Borinquen
- USAT Bowling Green Victory
- USAT Brigadier General Arthur W. Yates (ferry)
- USAT Brigadier General Harry E. Rethers
- USAT Brigadier General William E. Horton (ferry)
- USAT Bridgeport
- USAT Buford
- USAT Burnside (converted to cable ship)

=== C ===
- USAT Cambrai
- USAT Cantigny
- USAT Captain Arlo L. Olson
- USAT Cardinal O'Connell
- USAT Caribqueen
- USAT Charles L. Wheeler
- USAT Chateau Thierry
- USAT Chatham
- USAT Chaumont
- USAT Chester A. Arthur
- USAT Chippewa
- USAT Chirikof
- USAT City of Dallas
- USAT City of Fort Worth
- USAT City of Houston
- USAT City of Lowell
- USAT City of Philadelphia
- USAT Clevedon
- USAT Colbert
- USAT Colonel Frederick C. Johnson
- USAT Colonel George W. Ricker
- USAT Colonel Henry R. Casey
- USAT Colonel James A. Moss
- USAT Colonel John E. Baxter
- USAT Colonel John V. White
- USAT Colonel Norris Staynton
- USAT Colonel P. S. Michie
- USAT Colonel Pond
- USAT Colonel William B. Corwin
- USAT Colonel William J. O'Brien
- USAT Colorado
- USAT Contessa
- USAT Copiapo (See CSAV History)
- USAT Corporal Eric G. Gibson
- USAT Crescent City
- USAT Cristobal
- USAT Crook
- USAT Crown City
- USAT Crown Reefer
- USAT Cuba
- USAT Cynthia Olsen – sunk 7 December 1941

=== D ===
- USAT Dakotan
- USAT David C. Shanks
- USAT David W. Branch
- USAT Davis
- USAT Dellwood
- USAT Dix
- USAT Don Esteban
- USAT Don Isidro

=== E ===
- USAT Edmund B. Alexander
- USAT Edward Chambers
- USAT Egbert (Ex Philippine war hospital ship Missouri found unfit for that service.)
- USAT Elna
- USAT El Occidente
- USAT El Oriente
- USAT El Sol
- USAT Eric G. Gibson
- USAT Ernest Hinds
- USAT Esther Johnson
- USAT Etolin
- USAT Evangeline
- USAT Excelsior

=== F ===
- USAT Finland
- USAT Florida
- USAT Formalhaut
- USAT Fred C. Ainsworth
- USAT Frederick Funston
- USAT Frederick Lykes (formerly SS Sea Hound (1940))

=== G ===
Note: The newer, large transports of WW II named for generals were the P2-S2-R2 variant of the P2 transport design, not an indicator of service affiliation. All of the "Admiral" variants that were put into service were transferred to the Army after the war and renamed for generals. The Army did name a number of its non P2 type ships, many pre war, after generals.

- USAT Gatun
- USAT General A. W. Brewster
- USAT General A. W. Greely
- USAT General Alexander M. Patch
- USAT General Brehon B. Somervell
- USAT General C. C. Ballou
- USAT General C. G. Morton
- USAT General C. H. Muir
- USAT General D. E. Aultman
- USAT General D. S. Stanley
- USAT General Daniel I. Sultan
- USAT General E. T. Collins
- USAT General Edwin D. Patrick
- USAT General Frank M. Coxe
- USAT General G. B. Getty
- USAT General George H. Weeks
- USAT General Gillespie
- USAT General H. B. Freeman
- USAT General H. Brown
- USAT General H. F. Hodges
- USAT General Harry Taylor
- USAT General Hugh J. Gaffey
- USAT General J. H. McRae
- USAT General J. M. Brannan
- USAT General John McE. Hyde
- USAT General John Pope
- USAT General Joseph E. Johnston
- USAT General LeRoy Eltinge
- USAT General M. B. Stewart
- USAT General M. L. Hersey
- USAT General M. M. Patrick
- USAT General Maurice Rose
- USAT General Meigs
- USAT General Mifflin
- USAT General Nathanael Greene
- USAT General Nelson M. Walker
- USAT General O. H. Ernst
- USAT General Omar Bundy
- USAT General Oswald H. Ernst
- USAT General Otis
- USAT General R. B. Ayers
- USAT General R. E. Callan
- USAT General R. H. Jackson
- USAT General R. L. Howze
- USAT General R. M. Blatchford
- USAT General Richard Arnold
- USAT General Robert M. O'Reilley
- USAT General S. B. Holabird
- USAT General S. D. Sturgis
- USAT General Simon B. Buckner
- USAT General Stuart Heintzelman
- USAT General Vallejo
- USAT General W. C. Gorgas
- USAT General W. C. Langfitt
- USAT General W. F. Hase
- USAT General W. G. Haan
- USAT General W. H. Gordon
- USAT General W. M. Black
- USAT General W. P. Randolph
- USAT General W. P. Richardson
- USAT General Wm. M. Graham
- USAT General William O. Darby
- USAT General William Weigel
- USAT George S. Simonds
- USAT George W. Goethals
- USAT George Washington
- USAT George Washington Carver
- USAT Golden Eagle
- USAT Grant
- USAT Great Northern
- USAT Greenville Victory
- USAT Grey Lag

=== H ===
- USAT H. A. Scandrett
- USAT Haleakala
- USAT Hancock
- USAT Havana
- USAT Heffron
- USAT Hennepin
- USAT Henry Gibbins (1943) (C3 troopship)
- USAT Henry Keswick
- USAT Henry R. Mallory
- USAT Henry T. Allen
- USAT Herkimer
- USAT Honda Knot
- USAT Hooker (converted to cable ship, lost August 1899, Manila)
- USAT Howell Cobb
- USAT Hubert L. Wigmore (ex USAT Collier No. 1 built 1914 at Shanghai, China for U.S. Army, based Manila under port Quartermaster 1916–1926)
- USAT Hugh L. Scott
- USAT Hunter Liggett

=== I ===
- USAT Imperial (See CSAV History)
- USAT International
- USAT Iroquois
- USAT Irvin L. Hunt

=== J ===
- USAT J. Franklin Bell
- USAT J. W. McAndrew
- USAT Jack
- USAT James O'Hara
- USAT James Parker
- USAT Jarrett M. Huddleston
- USAT John Armstrong
- USAT John Ericsson
- USAT John L. Clem
- USAT John L. McCarley
- USAT John P. Mitchell
- USAT John Pen
- USAT Jonna
- USAT Joseph T. Dickman
- USAT Joseph V. Connolly

=== K ===
- USAT Kerowlee
- USAT Kentuckian
- USAT Kilpatrick
- USAT Kingsport Victory
- USAT Kivichak

=== L ===
- USAT Lakehurst
- USAT Lake Ormoc
- USAT Laurentia
- USAT Lawton
- USAT Legazpi
- USAT Lenape
- USAT Leonard Wood
- USAT Lew Wallace
- USAT Lib Trylon
- USAT Liberty
- USAT Lieutenant Colonel Herman C. Schwumm
- USAT Liscum
- USAT Logan
- USAT LST-246
- USAT LST-833
- USAT Lt. Alexander R. Nininger
- USAT Lt. Col. John U. D. Page
- USAT Lt. Col. Robert E. Shannon
- USAT Lt. George W. G. Boyce (acquired by the Navy as USNS Lt. George W. G. Boyce (T-AK-251))
- USAT Lt. James E. Robinson
- USAT Lt. John Craig
- USAT Lt. Raymond O. Beaudoin
- USAT Lt. Robert Craig (acquired by the Navy as USNS Lt. Robert Craig (T-AK-252))
- USAT Ludington

=== M ===
- USAT M. G. Zalinski
- USAT Mactan
- USAT Madawaska
- USAT Madison
- USAT Major General Henry Gibbins (1918)
- USAT Major General William H. Hart (ferry)
- USAT Manitoba (became USAT Logan)
- USAT Masaya
- USAT Matagalpa
- USAT Maui
- USAT Maurine
- USAT McAndrew
- USAT McClellan
- USAT McPherson
- USAT Meade
- USAT Meigs
- USAT Melrose
- USAT Merrimack
- USAT Merritt
- USAT M.I.T. Victory
- USAT Minnesotan
- USAT Mokatam
- USAT Morlen
- USAT Montanan
- USAT Monterey
- USAT Monticello
- USAT Mount McKinley
- USAT Mount Vernon
- USAT Muskingum

=== N ===
- USAT Nebraskan
- USAT Nevada
- USAT Norindies
- USAT Norlago
- USAT North Coast

=== O ===
- USAT Octorara
- USAT Oneida
- USAT Ontonagon
- USAT Orizaba
- USAT Otsego
- USAT Ozark

=== P ===
- USAT Pal Aulaut
- USAT Panaman
- USAT Pastores
- USAT Pillory
- USAT Point San Pedro
- USAT Portmar
- USAT President Buchanan
- USAT President Coolidge
- USAT President Fillmore
- USAT President Garfield
- USAT President Grant
- USAT President Polk
- USAT President Taylor
- USAT President Tyler
- USAT Private Elden H. Johnson
- USAT Private Francis X. McGraw
- USAT Private Frank J. Petrarca
- USAT Private Joe R. Hastings
- USAT Private Joe E. Mann
- USAT Private Joe P. Martinez
- USAT Private John F. Thorson
- USAT Private John R. Towle
- USAT Private Joseph F. Merrell
- USAT Private Leonard C. Brostrom
- USAT Private Sadao S. Munemori
- USAT Private William H. Thomas
- USAT Puebla

=== R ===
- USAT Rawlins
- USAT Republic
- USAT Resolute
- USAT Roanoke
- USAT Robin Doncaster
- USAT Robert C. Grier
- USAT Rochimbea
- USAT Rosecrans

=== S ===
- USAT San Antonio
- USAT Santa Cecilia (1913)
- USAT Santa Clara
- USAT Santa Cruz
- USAT Santa Maria
- USAT Santa Paula
- USAT Santa Rosa (1916)
- USAT Saratoga
- USAT Sargent Charles E. Mower
- USAT Sgt. Sylvester Antolak
- USAT Saturnia
- USAT Scott
- USAT Sea Barb
- USAT Sea Cat
- USAT Sea Devil
- USAT Sea Marlin
- USAT Sea Witch
- USAT Seatrain Texas
- USAT Sedgwick
- USAT Sgt. Andrew Miller
- USAT Sgt. Archer T. Gammon
- USAT Sgt. Charles E. Mower
- USAT Sgt. Cornelius H. Charlton
- USAT Spindle Eye / Sgt. Curtis F. Shoup
- USAT Sgt. George D. Keathley
- USAT Sgt. George Peterson
- USAT Sgt. Howard E. Woodford
- USAT Sgt. Howard L. Kimsey
- USAT Sgt. Jack J. Pendelton
- USAT Sgt. Jonah E. Kelley
- USAT Sgt. Joseph E. Muller
- USAT Sgt. Morris E. Crain
- USAT Sgt. Sylvester Antolak
- USAT Sgt. Truman Kimbro
- USAT Sgt. William R. Button
- USAT Shawnee
- USAT Sheridan
- USAT Sherman
- USAT Short Splice
- USAT Siboney
- USAT Sicilien
- USAT Soreldoc
- USAT South Bend
- USAT Spitfire
- USAT State of Maryland
- USAT State of Virginia
- USAT St. Mihiel
- USAT St. Olaf
- USAT Sumner
- USAT Symal Dyke

=== T ===
- USAT Taku
- USAT Talamanca
- USAT Tasker H. Bliss
- USAT Teapa
- USAT Tenadores
- USAT Thomas
- USAT Thomas H. Barry
- USAT Tulagi

=== U ===
- USAT U. S. Grant

=== W ===
- USAT Warren
- USAT West Corum
- USAT West Texas
- USAT Will H. Point
- USAT Willard A. Holbrook
- USAT William L. Thompson
- USAT William Lester
- USAT Wichita Falls
- USAT Wright

=== Y ===
- USAT Y-17
- USAT Y-75
- USAT Yarmouth
- USAT Yu Sang
- USAT Yucatan

=== Z ===
- USAT Zebulon B. Vance

== Tugs ==
Army tugs were seen as far back as the American Civil War with the 1862 screw tug Terror. World War II era tugs came in two general classifications, though those were not rigid and variances may particularly be seen in commercial vessels taken in early during the war. Seagoing tugs, 92'-100' or greater were designated Large Tug (LT). Harbor tugs were Small Tugs (ST). The Transportation Corps determined that at war's end it was operating 746 tugs of the LT/ST types.

A large number of highly varied commercial tugs were taken into Army service above those constructed to Army designs and Army tugs of prewar design dating to the early 1900s. In addition to these there were a variety of small towing craft, numbering in thousands, termed motor towing launches (MTL), sometimes overlapping the STs in length, and marine tractors of 40'and less length, some with the colorful name of "Sea Mules" with dimensions of 40 x 13 x 8 and two Chrysler gasoline engines. All were simply U.S. Army (LT/ST #).

A construction program in Australia built a number of tugs for the Southwest Pacific Area in both LT and ST size. They were U.S. Army tugs, but not carried in the same central listing as the U.S. built tugs. A number of the tugs became Navy tugs after 1950.

=== Large Tug (LT) ===
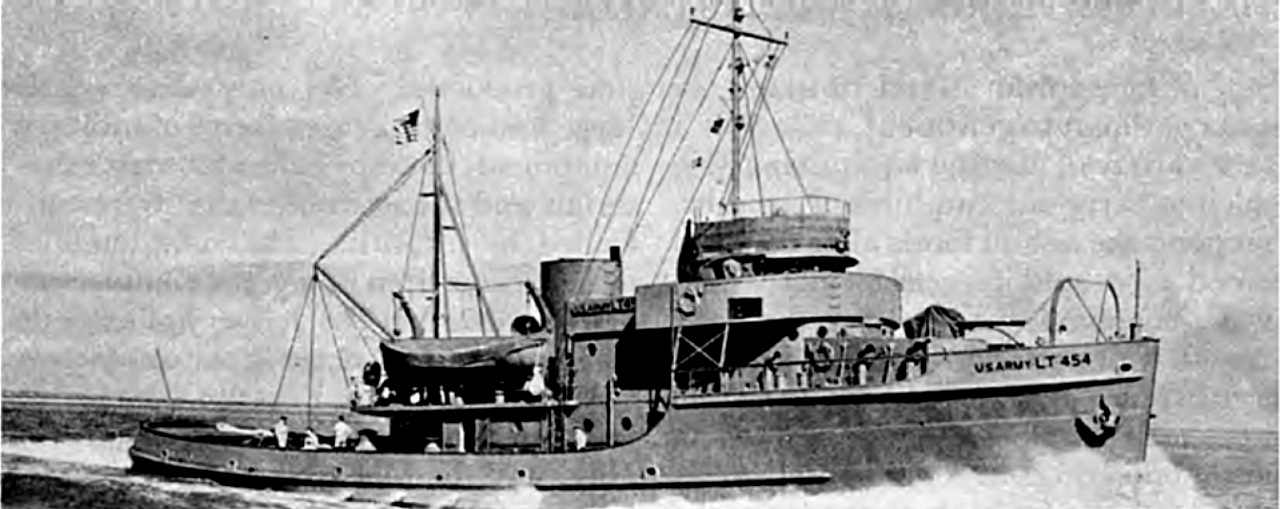
U.S. Army LT-454, a 143-foot diesel electric ocean-going tug of a type used extensively in theaters of operations. (United States Army In World War II – The Technical Services – The Transportation Corps: Movements, Training, And Supply, p.474.)

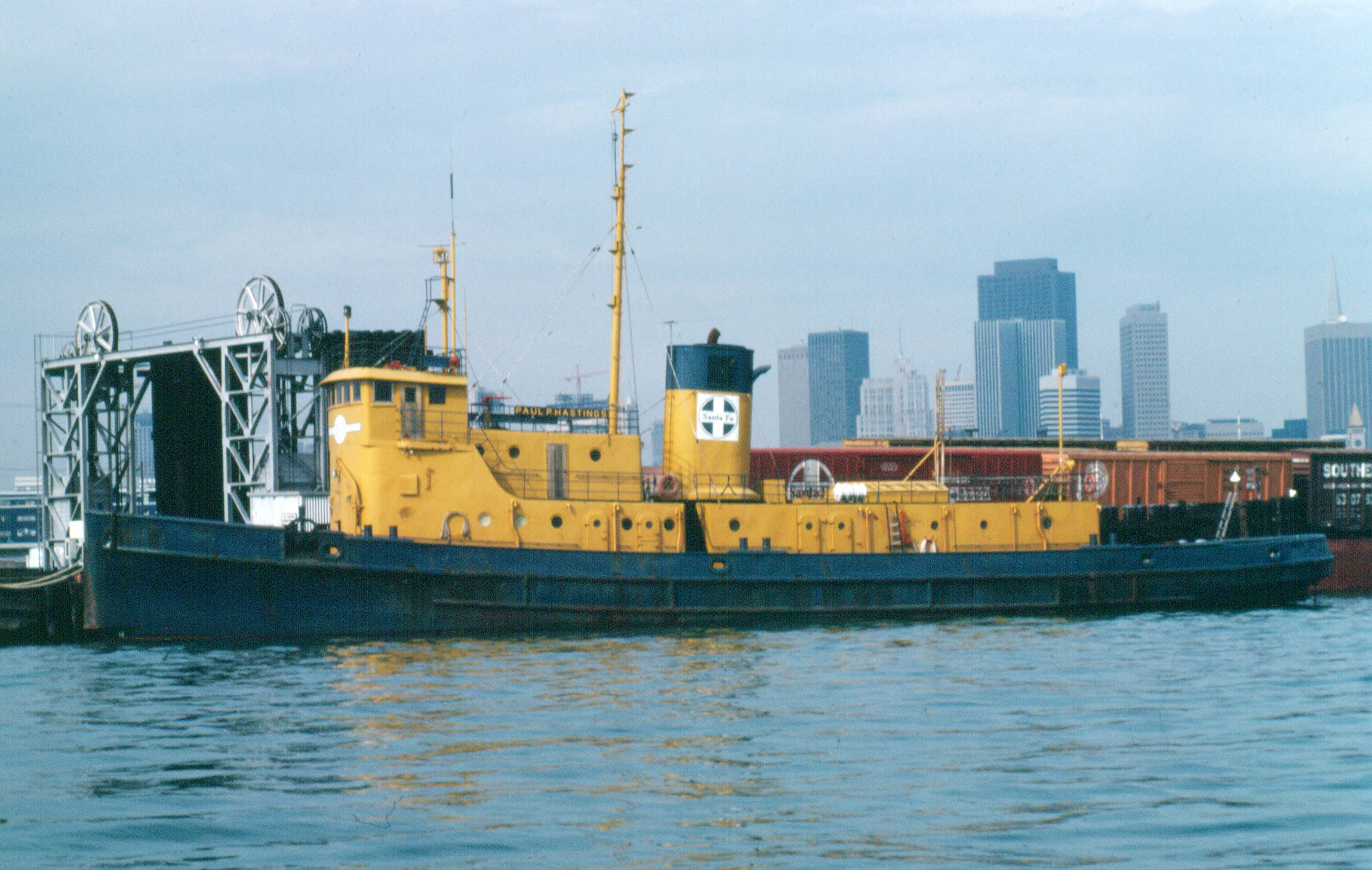
The Paul P. Hastings tugboat (ex U.S. Army LT-814) in China Basin, San Francisco in 1982. At this time she was the last of the Santa Fe Railroad tugs still in service.

Only the first eight World War II-era LT numbered tugs built by Jakobson Shipyard, Oyster Bay New York, were given names during construction. The Army acquired commercial vessels or had in its inventory tugs early during WWII, before standardized design construction met requirements, that were LT in size which retained commercial names and did not have LT numbers. WWII LT construction did not use numbers greater than 935 with postwar LTs having four digit numbers until numbers starting with LT-801 were reused with 1993 construction.

==== Named, unnumbered Large Tug (LT) size ====
- Big Chief
- BG John B. Bellinger
- General Charles R. Krauthoff
- General Richard Arnold
- General Robert Anderson
- General Thomas S. Jessup
- Lt. Col. George S. Gillis
- Lt. Col. Herbert L. Kidwell
- Lt. Col. Lawrence O. Matthews
- Lt. Col. William R. Kendricks
- Maj Geo J. Harrell

==== World War II numbered Large Tug (LT) ====
- U.S. Army MAJ Ethel A. Robbins (LT 1)
- U.S. Army Maj Randolph J. Hermandez (LT 2)
- U.S. Army Maj MAJ Ralph Bogle (LT 3)
- U.S. Army Maj Wilbur F. Browder (LT 4)
- U.S. Army Maj Elisha K. Henson (LT-5)
- U.S. Army Maj Ocea L. Ferris (LT 6)
- U.S. Army Maj George W. Hovey (LT 7)
- U.S. Army Maj Charles A. Radcliff (LT 8)
- U.S. Army "LT-57"
- U.S. Army "LT-60"
- U.S. Army "LT-62"
- U.S. Army "LT-132"
- U.S. Army LT-154 "Keith E. Selders"
- U.S. Army "LT-156"
- U.S. Army LT-159 "John O'Reilly"
- U.S. Army "LT-187"
- U.S. Army LT-214 "Arthur A. Tanner"
- U.S. Army "LT-221"
- U.S. Army "LT-239"
- U.S. Army "LT-371"
- U.S. Army "LT-376"
- U.S. Army "LT-377"
- U.S. Army "LT-389"
- U.S. Army "LT-452"
- U.S. Army "LT-455"
- U.S. Army "LT-532"
- U.S. Army LT-535
- U.S. Army "LT-536"
- U.S. Army "LT-646"
- U.S. Army "LT-784"
- U.S. Army LT-814
- U.S. Army "LT-815"
- U.S. Army "LT-820"
- U.S. Army "LT-821"

==== Postwar numbered Large Tug (LT) ====
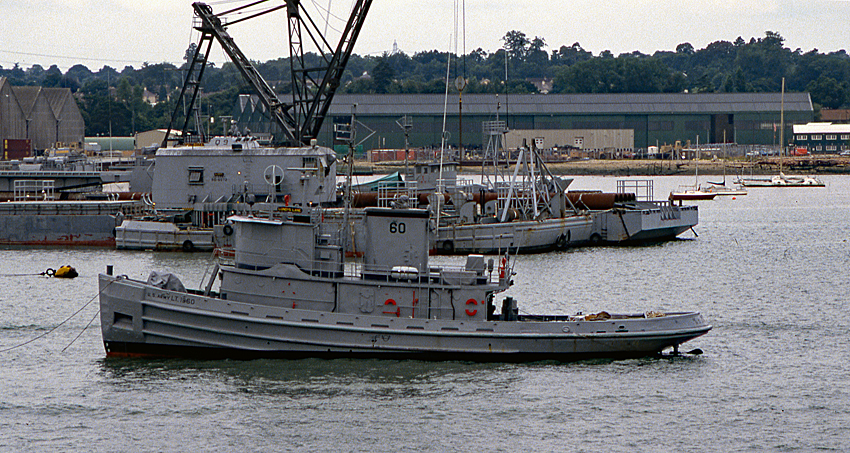
U.S. Army LT–1960 Lindis Lane at Field Support Battalion-Hythe, England

- U.S. Army "LT–1960" Lindis Lane
- U.S. Army "LT-1964"
- U.S. Army "LT-2075"
- U.S. Army "LT-2082"
- U.S. Army Col. Albert H. Barkley

=== Small Tug (ST) ===
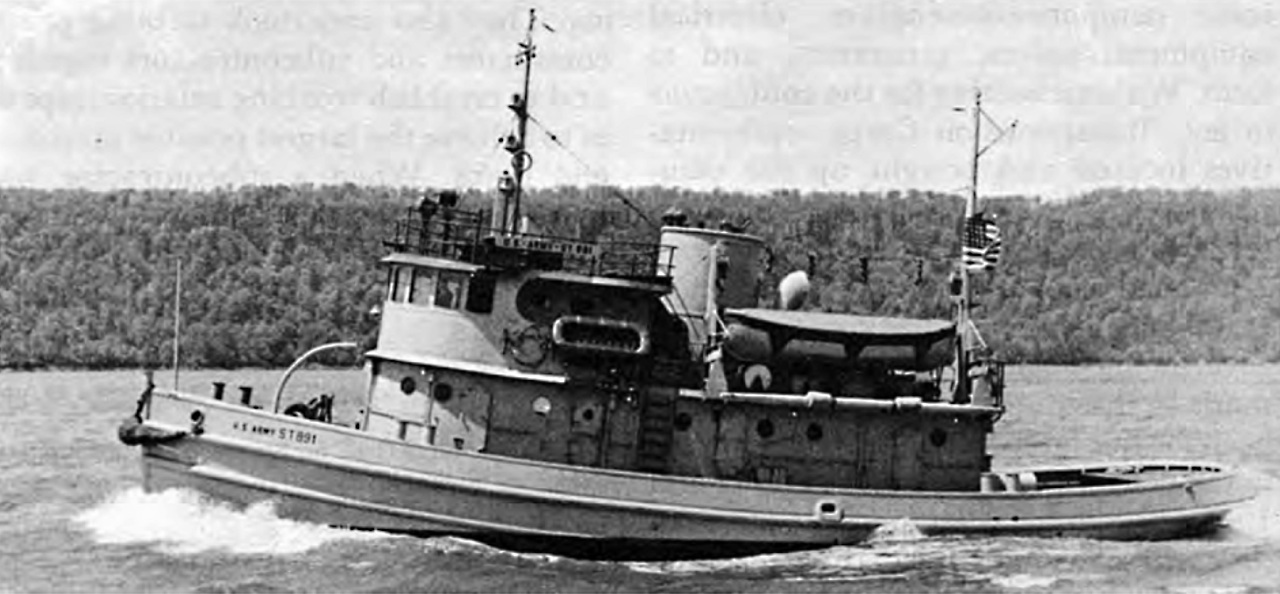
U.S. Army ST-891, an 85-foot (Design 327D) diesel small tug. (United States Army In World War II-The Technical Services-The Transportation Corps: Movements, Training, And Supply, p.487.)

- U.S. Army "ST-10"
- U.S. Army "ST-35"
- U.S. Army "ST-39"
- U.S. Army "ST-165"
- U.S. Army "ST-488"
- U.S. Army "ST-511"
- U.S. Army "ST-539"
- U.S. Army "ST-672"
- U.S. Army "ST-674"
- U.S. Army "ST-675"
- U.S. Army "ST-679"
- U.S. Army "ST-695"
- U.S. Army "ST-719"
- U.S. Army "ST-720"
- U.S. Army "ST-725"
- U.S. Army "ST-731"

== Self-propelled barges (BSP) ==
- BSP-1915

== Post-1950 USAS ==
- USAS Report (AGP-289)
- USAS American Mariner
- USAS Muskingum (V-108)

== See also ==
- List of World War II vessel types of the United States
