= USST =

USST may refer to:

- the United States Ski Team
- the University of Saskatchewan Space Design Team
- the University of Shanghai for Science and Technology, China
- United States Steel Tug, a former ship prefix used in the US Navy (e.g. USST 488)
- U.S. Smokeless Tobacco Company
