= SS Santa Teresa =

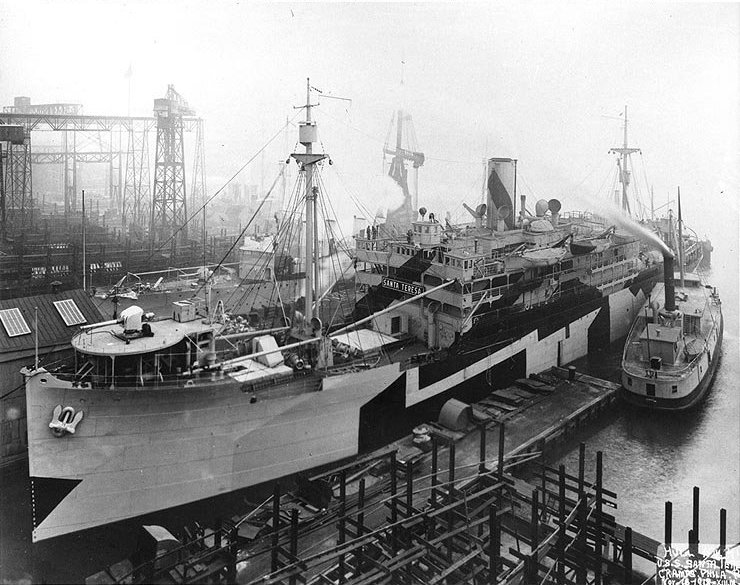
- USS Santa Teresa (ID 3804) at the outfitting dock, 18 November 1918

History

United States
- Name: Santa Teresa
- Operator: Grace Lines, U.S. Army, U.S. Navy
- Builder: William Cramp & Sons, Philadelphia
- Launched: 4 July 1918
- Christened: Santa Teresa
- In service: Navy: 18 Nov 1918 - 7 Oct 1919; Commercial: 1919 - 1941; Army: 14 Apr 1941 - 21 Jul 1941; Navy: 22 Jul 1941 - 24 Mar 1942; Army: Mar 1942 - Sep 1945; PHS: Apr 1946 - Apr 1947
- Renamed: USS Santa Teresa (ID 3804), SS Santa Teresa, SS Kent, USS Kent (AP-28), USAT/USAHS Ernest Hinds
- Stricken: 1959
- Fate: Sold for scrap, 20 May 1957

General characteristics
- Displacement: 5,341 tons (lt) 8,890 t. (fl)
- Length: 373 ft 9 in
- Beam: 51 ft 6 in
- Draft: 24 ft 5 in
- Propulsion: Steam turbine
- Speed: 11 knots
- Troops: 751
- Complement: 254
- Armament: World War I: 1 × 5" gun, 1 × 4" gun, 2 × 1-pounders; World War II: 4 × 3"/50 caliber guns; 8 × .50 cal (12.7 mm) machine guns

Built in 1918, the SS Santa Teresa was originally a passenger liner. In World War I she was requisitioned by the U.S. Navy and served under the title USS Santa Teresa (ID 3804). She served as a commercial vessel between the wars, first under her original name, and later as the SS Kent. During World War II she served first with the U.S. Army as the USAT Ernest Hinds, named for Major General Ernest Hinds. She was later part of the Navy as USS Kent (AP-28). She spent the final part of the war as an Army hospital ship, once more under the name USAT (or USAHS) Ernest Hinds.

== Operational history ==
Santa Teresa, an 8890-ton transport, was built in 1918 at Philadelphia, as a civilian passenger liner. Taken over by the Navy for World War I use, she was commissioned in mid-November 1918 as USS Santa Teresa (ID 3804), a week after the Armistice ended the fighting. Between December 1918 and September 1919 Santa Teresa made seven round-trip voyages between the United States and France, primarily bringing home war veterans. The ship was decommissioned in October 1919 and turned over to the U.S. Shipping Board for return to her owners. During the next two decades she operated commercially as SS Santa Teresa and, after 1936, as SS Kent.

=== World War II ===
In April 1941 the U.S. Army purchased the Kent. Renamed Ernest Hinds, she was converted to a troopship at Boston, and took part in maneuvers off Cape Cod before being transferred to the Navy in July 1941. After serving as USS Kent (AP-28) for eight months, she was returned to the Army in March 1942 and again became USAT Ernest Hinds.

During May 1942 - September 1943 Ernest Hinds operated as a transport, making a trip to Alaska in mid-1942 and thereafter carrying personnel and cargo between the U.S., Hawaii, and the South Pacific and within the latter region. The ship was converted to a hospital ship at San Francisco, California, between September 1943 and June 1944. She then steamed through the Panama Canal to begin service between the U.S. East Coast and the Mediterranean Sea.

Ernest Hinds's hospital ship service ended in September 1945 and she was again altered to a transport. She carried Jamaican laborers between Florida and Jamaica on behalf of the War Shipping Administration until turned over to the U.S. Public Health Service in April 1946 for use as a floating isolation ward at Jacksonville, Florida. She was transferred to the Maritime Administration in April 1947 and laid up at Brunswick, Georgia. Moved to the James River, Virginia, Reserve Fleet in April 1948, the nearly forty-year-old ship was sold for scrapping in May 1957.
