= USAHS Blanche F. Sigman =

American hospital ship

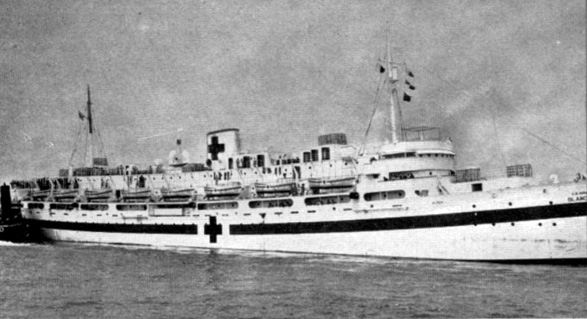
- USAHS Blanche F. Sigman in port, c. 1944–1946

History

United States
- Name: Stanford White
- Namesake: Stanford White
- Owner: United States Maritime Commission (USMC)
- Operator: United States Lines, Inc.
- Builder: California Shipbuilding Corp.; Los Angeles, California
- Way number: 7
- Laid down: 9 March 1943
- Launched: 5 April 1943
- Completed: 17 April 1943
- In service: after 17 April 1943
- Out of service: November 1943
- Fate: Transferred to the War Department

United States
- Name: USAHS Blanche F. Sigman
- Namesake: First Lieutenant Blanche F. Sigman, U.S. Army nurse killed at Anzio
- Owner: War Department
- Operator: Army Transportation Service
- Acquired: November 1943
- Refit: Todd Hoboken Yard, November 1943 – June 1944
- In service: July 1944
- Out of service: November 1948
- Homeport: Charleston; New York
- Fate: Sold for scrapping, 1974

General characteristics
- Class & type: Liberty ship; type EC2-S-C1, standard
- Tonnage: 7,000 LT DWT
- Length: 441 feet 6 inches (135 m) oa; 416 feet (127 m) pp; 427 feet (130 m) lwl
- Beam: 57 feet (17 m)
- Draft: 27 ft 9.25 in (8.4646 m)
- Propulsion: 1 × triple-expansion steam engine, 1 × screw propeller
- Speed: 11.5 knots (21.3 km/h; 13.2 mph)
- Capacity: 562,608 cubic feet (15,931 m^{3}) (grain); 499,573 cubic feet (14,146 m^{3}) (bale)
- Complement: 38–62 USMM; 21–40 USNAG
- Armament: Varied by ship; Bow-mounted 3-inch (76 mm)/50-caliber gun; Stern-mounted 4-inch (102 mm)/50-caliber gun; 2–8 × single 20-millimeter (0.79 in) Oerlikon anti-aircraft (AA) cannons and/or, 2–8 × 37-millimeter (1.46 in) M1 AA guns

Differences as USAHS Blanche F. Sigman:
- Tonnage: 7,933 gross tons
- Draft: 24 ft (7.3 m)
- Range: 17,000 nautical miles (31,000 km; 20,000 mi)
- Capacity: 595 patients
- Armament: None

USAHS Blanche F. Sigman was a United States Army hospital ship during World War II. The ship was completed in April 1943 as Liberty ship SS Stanford White. When selected for conversion to a hospital ship, she was originally assigned the name USAHS Poppy, but never operated under that name. After being decommissioned as a hospital ship, she became U.S. Army transport USAT Blanche F. Sigman.

SS Stanford White, named in honor of American architect Stanford White, was built by California Shipbuilding Corporation of Los Angeles for the United States Maritime Commission (USMC) in early 1943. Laid down in March 1943 and launched the following month, the ship was assigned to United States Lines, Inc. for merchant operation by the War Shipping Administration (WSA). Stanford White made her way from California to New York and from that port made one transatlantic round trip to Liverpool.

In November 1943, the WSA allocated the ship to the U.S. Army, which converted her to a hospital ship. Though initially assigned the name Poppy, she was instead named in honor of First Lieutenant Blanche F. Sigman, a U.S. Army nurse killed in action in Italy. The hospital ship was initially based in Charleston, South Carolina, and made multiple voyages to ports in England, the Mediterranean, and France. After her homeport was changed to New York in December 1945, she made several more runs to Europe as a hospital ship, then converted to USAT Blanche F. Sigman in April 1946. As a transport, the ship made numerous trips bringing home nurses and military personnel prior to entering the National Defense Reserve Fleet in 1948. The ship was declared surplus by the Army in 1949, and sold for scrapping in 1974.

== Liberty ship ==
Stanford White (MC Hull No. 738) was laid down on 9 March 1943 on ship way 7 at California Shipbuilding Corp. (Calship) of Los Angeles as a standard Liberty ship. The ship was launched on Monday, 5 April 1943 (the same day as another Calship-built Liberty, Benjamin Cardozo), and delivered 17 April 1943, taking 39 days from start to delivery. The ship was initially to be launched on Saturday, 3 April, but had suffered minor damage from a fire the day before.

Though it is not known where Stanford White spent the first five months of her merchant career, she spent the last two in the Atlantic. She sailed from Galveston, Texas on 12 September 1943 and arrived in Key West on 16 September. The ship departed the same day for New York and arrived there on 22 September. On 28 September the ship, carrying a general cargo, joined a convoy headed to Liverpool, where it arrived on 13 October. Five days later, the Stanford White set out for New York, arriving back there on 4 November.

== Hospital ship ==
In late November 1943 the ship was transferred by the WSA to the War Department for operation as a Hague Convention hospital ship by the U.S. Army. The ship put into the Todd Hoboken Shipyard at the Port of New York for conversion, remaining there until completion on 30 June 1944. The ship was initially assigned the name Poppy, under the then-current policy of naming Army hospital ships after flowers, but never operated under that name. The ship was instead named after First Lieutenant Blanche F. Sigman, a U.S. Army nurse killed in action on 7 February 1944 on the beachhead during Operation Shingle, the Allied landings at Anzio.

After sailing for the Clyde and back to New York in July on its first mercy mission, Blanche F. Sigman moved to its new homeport of Charleston in August 1944. Sailing later that month, the Sigman headed to the Mersey and Liverpool. In October the ship sailed for Gibraltar, Oran, and Leghorn. In December, it repeated its previous voyage but also stopped at Naples as well, eventually making its way back to Charleston in January 1945. Throughout 1945, the hospital ship made six transatlantic treks, visiting Marseille three times, Naples, Oran, Gibraltar, Milford Haven, Wales, Avonmouth, Cherbourg, and Horta. The Sigman's sixth mission of the year was a return trip to Cherbourg that ended with a return to its new homeport of New York.

From New York, Blanche F. Sigman made three sojourns, calling at Cherbourg for a third time, Bremerhaven three times, The Downs, and Le Havre. While in Europe during the third trip, the ship was decommissioned as a hospital ship in April 1946 and returned to New York with a load of Army and Red Cross nurses, and members of the Women's Army Corps. Throughout 1947 and into 1948, the Sigman made numerous trips for the Army, primarily between Bremerhaven and New York.

On 22 November 1948, Blanche F. Sigman entered the National Defense Reserve Fleet (NDRF) at the James River in Virginia. Loaded with permanent ballast of 600 long tons (610 t) of pig iron and 490 long tons (500 t) of concrete blocks, the former hospital ship sat in mothballs for 25 years before being offered for disposal in late 1973. The ship was awarded to Max Wender for scrapping on 23 January 1974 for $145,115, and was withdrawn from the NDRF and delivered to Wender on 17 May 1974.

== Bibliography ==
- Charles, Roland W. (April 1947). Troopships of World War II. Washington, D.C.: Army Transportation Association. OCLC 1871625.
