= USAT St. Mihiel =

American troop transport ship

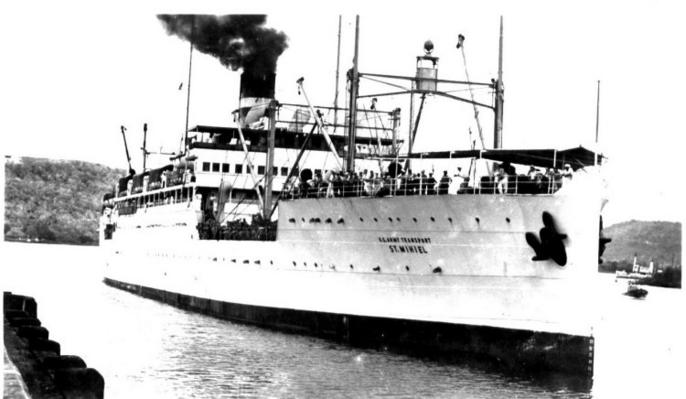
- USAT St. Mihiel prior to World War II

History

United States
- Name: St. Mihiel
- Namesake: St. Mihiel, a World War I battlefield in France
- Owner: United States government
- Operator: United States Army (1920–1941); United States Navy (1941–1943); United States Army (1943–1947)
- Builder: American International Shipbuilding
- Cost: ~$2,000,000
- Yard number: 672
- Laid down: 20 November 1918 as Sinnemahoning(?)
- Launched: 19 November 1919
- Completed: September 1920
- Acquired: 29 October 1920
- Commissioned: (Navy) 22 Jul 1941 (Note: Army did not "commission" its ships in the formal sense, they were in service.)
- Decommissioned: (Navy) 16 Nov 1943
- Identification: United States O/N: 220739
- Honors and awards: One battle star for World War II service
- Fate: Scrapped, 1957

General characteristics
- Class & type: EFC Design 1024, Standard, Fabricated, Hog Island Type B
- Displacement: 8,550 tons (lt)
- Length: 448 ft (137 m)
- Beam: 58 ft 2 in (17.73 m)
- Draft: 28 ft (8.5 m)
- Propulsion: Steam turbine
- Speed: 15.5 knots (28.7 km/h)
- Range: 24 days
- Complement: 253
- Armament: (WWII) 1 x 5"/38 caliber dual purpose gun, 4 x 3"/50 caliber dp guns, 2 x 20mm caliber Oerlikon twin AA guns

St. Mihiel was a troopship built for the United States Shipping Board by the American International Shipbuilding Corporation at Hog Island, Pennsylvania. The ship was operated from 1922 until mid-1940 as USAT St. Mihiel by the Army Transport Service. In July 1941 the ship was transferred to the Navy which commissioned her USS St. Mihiel with the hull number AP-32. In November 1943, she was transferred back to the Army and converted into the hospital ship, USAHS St. Mihiel.

== Construction ==
St. Mihiel, named in honor of the Army's role in the Battle of Saint-Mihiel in World War I, was an EFC Design 1024 ship built by the American International Shipbuilding Corporation at Hog Island, Pennsylvania for the United States Shipping Board (USSB). During the planning stage names for the 120 ships to be built at Hog Island were selected by First Lady Edith Wilson who selected names based on the "aboriginal inhabitants of the United States" with Sinnemahoning being the prospective name for hull number 672 that was to be completed as St. Mihiel. (Note: Search of contemporary references at time of launch do not indicate this name in use. McKellar generally gives contract names where used with completion name superseding. In this case no such prospective or "laid down as" name is shown. Sinnemahoning may have died as a name by the time this ship's keel was laid.)

The design was for either a troopship or later use as a passenger/cargo ship with a contracted seventy vessels of the type with fifty-eight cancelled and only twelve built. The ship was launched 19 November 1919 with completion and delivery to the USSB in October 1920 with United States Official Number 220739. The ship was 448 feet (136.6 m) in length between perpendiculars, 58 feet (17.7 m) beam, 28 feet .75 inches (8.6 m) loaded draft and powered by a Curtis steam turbine divided into high and low pressure sections, each having three ahead and one astern stages, and double reduction gears rated at 6,000 horsepower provided by General Electric Company.

== Army transport ==
The newly built ship was transferred to the War Department on 29 October 1920 for operation with the Army Transport Service (ATS) homeported at the Brooklyn Army Base in New York. Until 1923 St. Mihiel generally ran between the New York Port of Embarkation and Antwerp, Belgium. After transporting the last United States troop contingent from Germany from Antwerp in January 1923 she was assigned the New York—San Juan, Puerto Rico—Panama until 1926. During this period of Atlantic service St. Mihiel was awarded the Army's Efficiency ("E") pennant for Atlantic transports in 1922, transported the 213th Coast Artillery from New York to Fort Monroe for summer training and engaged in hurricane relief operations at San Juan during September 1928.

St. Mihiel was transferred to the ATS Pacific Fleet and homeported at the San Francisco Port of Embarkation, Fort Mason, California where she was placed on the San Francisco—Honolulu—Panama—New York route during 1931 and 1932 until laid up at Fort Mason 16 November 1932. In April 1935 the ship was returned to service for the transport of 287 Midwestern farm families on relief during the depression to Alaska to establish a new life. The ship was again laid up between 28 July 1939 and 15 Sep 1939 at Brooklyn with the crew transferred to USAT Leonard Wood. St. Mihiel operated on the Alaska route until transfer to the Navy.

== World War II ==
=== Navy service ===
On 22 July 1941 the ship was transferred to the Navy, classed as a transport with hull number AP-32, and commissioned as USS St. Mihiel the same day. St. Mihiel continued to perform the same Alaska service as she had for Army after commissioning. In July 1942, she transported the wreckage of the Akutan Zero to San Diego, which became first flyable Zero fighter acquired by the United States during the war.

Into 1943, she called regularly at ports on mainland Alaska and in the eastern Aleutians. In May 1943, she participated in the occupation of Attu; then resumed more routine transport duties. On 9 September 1943 she headed south to San Francisco. On the 23rd, she steamed west to Hawaii and from there began her last voyage for the Navy. Transiting the Panama Canal in mid-October, she steamed on to Boston, where she was decommissioned on 16 November 1943. St. Mihiel received one battle star for her service during the occupation of Attu: 11–29 May 1943.

=== Return to Army service ===
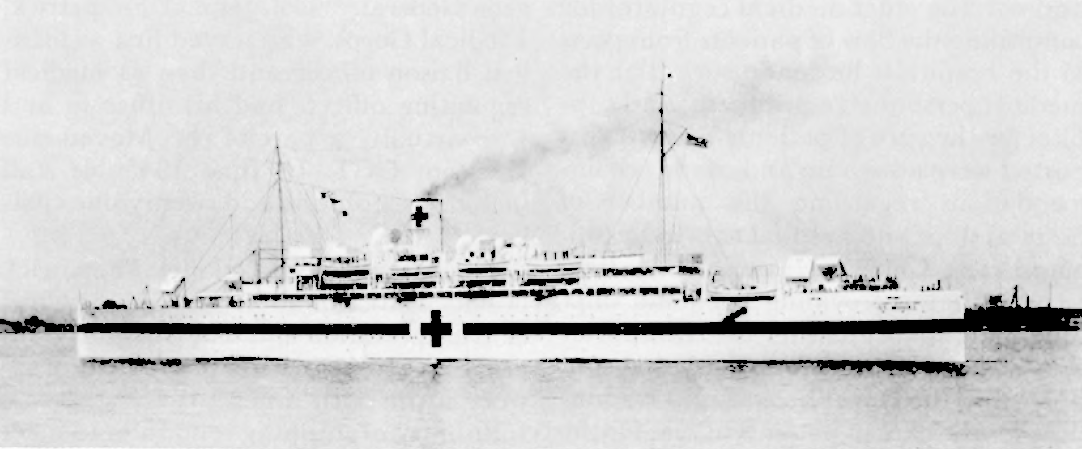
U.S. Army Hospital Ship St. Mihiel

St. Mihiel was returned to the Army which converted her to the Army hospital ship USAHS St. Mihiel. The ship had been considered for use as a full hospital ship for Army use in November of 1940 as the United States acquired remote bases without hospital facilities but transport needs prevailed. In June 1943 a plan for Army hospital ships was revived for the evacuation of helpless patients from forward area hospitals to the United States with St. Mihiel again among those chosen. The ship was converted with a capacity for 504 patients making the first voyage as USAHS St. Mihiel on 10 May 1944 for North Africa.

== Post war ==
The ship reverted to transport service in 1946. On 28 October 1947 she was delivered to United States Maritime Commission and laid up until scrapped at Baltimore by Patapsco Scrap Company in 1957.

== Bibliography ==
- Clay, Steven E. (2011). U.S. Army Order Of Battle 1919-1941 (PDF). Volume 4. The Services: Quartermaster, Medical, Military Police, Signal Corps, Chemical Warfare, And Miscellaneous Organizations, 1919-41. Vol. 4. Fort Leavenworth, KS: Combat Studies Institute Press. ISBN 9780984190140. LCCN 2010022326. Archived from the original (PDF) on 16 September 2012.
- Colton, T. (22 July 2010). "American International Shipbuilding (AISC)—Hog Island Shipyard, Philadelphia PA". Shipbuilding History. T. Colton. Archived from the original on 2 April 2015.
  - "Current website".
- International Marine Engineering (1920). "Troopships Completed at Hog Island". International Marine Engineering. 25 (September 1920). Simmons-Boardman Publishing Corporation: 737–740.
- Goldberg, Mark H. (1991). The Hog Islanders: the Story of 122 American Ships. American merchant marine history series. Vol. 1. Kings Point, N.Y.: American Merchant Marine Museum. LCCN 91073557. OCLC 25317937.
- Larson, Harold (1944). Army Hospital Ships. Washington, D.C.: Office of the Chief of Transportation, Army Service Forces, U. S. Army.
- McKellar, Norman L. "Steel Shipbuilding under the U. S. Shipping Board, 1917-1921, Part III, Contract Steel Ships". Steel Shipbuilding under the U. S. Shipping Board, 1917-1921. ShipScribe.
- Naval History And Heritage Command. "St. Mihiel". Dictionary of American Naval Fighting Ships. Naval History And Heritage Command.
- NavSource Online. "USAHS St. Mihiel". NavSource.
- de Tankerville, R. (1918). "Shipbuilding Notes". Shipping (16 March 1918). New York: Shipping Publishing Company: 545.
- Wardlow, Chester (1956). The Technical Services—The Transportation Corps: Movements, Training, And Supply. United States Army In World War II. Washington, D.C.: Center Of Military History, United States Army. LCCN 55060003.
