= USS General C. G. Morton =

Transport ship built in 1944

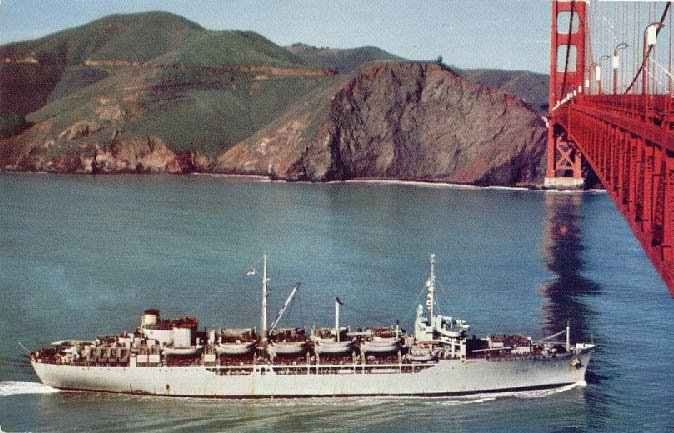
- USNS General C.G. Morton (T-AP-138) passing under the Golden Gate Bridge, San Francisco, California, in the 1950s

History

United States
- Name: General C.G. Morton
- Namesake: Charles Gould Morton
- Builder: Kaiser Co., Inc.; Richmond, California
- Laid down: date unknown
- Launched: 15 March 1944
- Acquired: 18 May 1944
- Commissioned: 7 July 1944
- Decommissioned: May 1946
- In service: May 1946 (Army); 1 March 1950 (MSTS)
- Out of service: 1 March 1950 (Army); before 29 May 1958 (MSTS)
- Renamed: SS Green Wave
- Reclassified: T-AP-138, 1 March 1950
- Stricken: 29 May 1958
- Identification: IMO number: 6801183
- Fate: Scrapped 1980

General characteristics
- Class & type: General G. O. Squier-class transport ship
- Displacement: 9,950 tons (light), 17,250 tons (full)
- Length: 522 ft 10 in (159.36 m)
- Beam: 71 ft 6 in (21.79 m)
- Draft: 26 ft 6 in (8.08 m)
- Propulsion: single-screw steam turbine with 9,900 shp (7,400 kW)
- Speed: 17 knots (31 km/h)
- Capacity: 4766 troops
- Complement: 494 (officers and enlisted)
- Armament: 4 × 5"/38 caliber guns; 8 × 1.1"/75 AA guns; 16 × 20 mm Oerlikon AA guns

USS General C. G. Morton (AP-138) was a General G. O. Squier-class transport ship for the U.S. Navy in World War II. She was named in honor of U.S. Army general Charles Gould Morton. She was transferred to the U.S. Army as USAT General C. G. Morton in 1946. On 1 March 1950 she was transferred to the Military Sea Transportation Service (MSTS) as USNS General C. G. Morton (T-AP-138). She was later sold for commercial operation under the name SS Green Wave, before being scrapped in 1980.

== Operational history ==
General G. G. Morton (APA-138) was built by the Kaiser Co. of Richmond, California, in 1943–44; acquired by the Navy on 18 May 1944; and commissioned 7 July 1944.

After shakedown out of San Pedro, California, she stood out independently for Guadalcanal, Solomon Islands, on 1 August, arriving 16 days later and loading homeward-bound troops. On 20 August she got underway arrived San Francisco 3 September, sailed on to San Diego and departed there 16 September for the Russell Islands 39 days later in the Solomons. Embarking troops, she proceeded to Espiritu Santo, New Hebrides, and thence to Nouméa, New Caledonia, before putting in at San Francisco 24 October.

General C. G. Morton steamed to San Diego and departed with a convoy 10 November, calling at Pearl Harbor six days later and reaching Guadalcanal 29 November. On 3 December she sailed for San Francisco via New Guinea, Manus Island, and Nouméa, arriving on the last day of 1944. After loading passengers at Long Beach, Calif., General C. G. Morton stood out 11 January 1945 bound for Calcutta, India, via Melbourne, Australia; she reached Melbourne 1 February and called at Calcutta 19 days later. Returning via Melbourne, Manus, Ulithi, Tinian, and Saipan, the transport arrived at San Francisco 25 April, only to get underway again 5 May for the Southwest Pacific, Hollandia, New Guinea, Leyte, and Manila, Philippines, were ports of call. General C. G. Morton touched at San Francisco 5 July before sailing three days later for the east coast. She transited the Panama Canal 17 July and put in at Boston six days later.

Following drydocking, the busy ship departed 12 August for France, touching at Marseille 22 August and returning to Newport News, Virginia, 2 September 1945. On her next voyage, the transport sailed via the Suez Canal to Karachi, India, and returned by the same route to New York. In early January 1946 General C. G. Morton repeated this trip, but sailed around the world calling at Singapore and Manila before docking at San Francisco in early March 1946. The ship's captain was to be discharged from the service upon arrival, the elongated second trip was due to his desire to see as much of the world as possible while in the Navy. As a result of the delay the troops coming home from India would boo the captain whenever he appeared on deck, which resulted in them being listed as 'mutinous'.

General C. G. Morton was delivered to the War Department for use by the Army in May 1946.

In the aftermath of the 1948 eruption of Philippine volcano Mount Hibok-Hibok, USAT General C. G. Morton was dispatched from Manila to assist in evacuations. Due to a lack of wharves at Camiguin (Mount Hibok-Hibok's location), all those fleeing had to board the ship from small craft. In the confusion no accurate number of those evacuated was available.

She was reinstated on the Navy List in March 1950 and assigned to MSTS Reserve.

During the Korean War, General C. G. Morton was reactivated and participated in the following campaigns:

- North Korean Aggression, from 1 to 2 August 1950 to 8 October 1952
- Communist China Aggression, 21 to 28 December 1950
- First UN Counter Offensive, 10 to 11 February 1951

On 15 February 1951, 200 nautical miles (370 km; 230 mi) east of Tokyo, Swedish tanker MV Christer Galen struck a submerged rock, breaking off a portion of the ship's bow. After receiving distress calls, General C. G. Morton and SS Marine Phoenix both helped to rescue all 47 passengers and crew.

In August 1952, General C. G. Morton arrived in San Francisco with 526 Army and Navy Korean War veterans, and 284 civilians from Hawaii.

In 1953 (month unknown), General C. G. Morton departed San Francisco with an unspecified number of troops for the Korean War. The Troops included members of the Air Force 315th Air Division, "Combat Cargo".

On 26 February 1954 General C.G. Morton arrived at Agana, Guam for a stop over en route to the port of San Francisco with military families on board. The ship reached San Francisco on about 23 April 1954, and docked at Fort Mason. 695 service members, military dependents, and civilian employees were aboard.

Struck again from the Navy List on 29 May 1958, General C. G. Morton was sold to Central Gulf Lines in 1967, and renamed SS Green Wave, USCG ON 508060, IMO 6801183. She was scrapped in Taiwan in February 1980.

General C. G. Morton received three battle stars for Korean War service.

== Sources ==
- Williams, Greg H. (2013). World War II U.S. Navy Vessels in Private Hands. McFarland Books. ISBN 978-0-7864-6645-0.
