= USS Muskingum =

Cargo ship of the United States Navy

History

United States
- Name: Muskingum
- Namesake: Muskingum County, Ohio
- Ordered: as type (C1-M-AV1) hull, MC hull 2152
- Builder: Globe Shipbuilding Co., Superior, Wisconsin
- Yard number: 119
- Laid down: 28 January 1944
- Launched: 30 June 1944
- Sponsored by: Mrs. Henry Larson
- Commissioned: 24 April 1945
- Decommissioned: 7 March 1946
- Stricken: 5 June 1946 and 15 June 1973
- Identification: Hull symbol: AK-198; Code letters: NEOO
- Fate: placed in service with Military Sea Transportation Service (MSTS), 1 July 1950
- Notes: used by the U.S. Army in Japan as USAT Muskingum (V-109) (1946-1950)

United States
- Name: Hennepin
- Operator: Military Sea Transportation Service
- In service: 1 July 1950
- Stricken: 15 June 1973
- Identification: Hull symbol: T-AK-198
- Fate: transferred to the Department of the Interior, Trust Territory of the Pacific Islands (TTPI), 4 October 1974

Trust Territory of the Pacific Islands
- Name: Fentress
- In service: 20 July 1974
- Out of service: 7 April 1982
- Fate: transferred, 7 April 1982

Republic of Palau
- Name: Muskingum
- In service: 7 April 1982
- Fate: Scrapped 1982

General characteristics
- Class & type: Alamosa-class cargo ship
- Type: C1-M-AV1
- Tonnage: 5,032 long tons deadweight (DWT)
- Displacement: 2,382 long tons (2,420 t) (standard); 7,450 long tons (7,570 t) (full load)
- Length: 388 ft 8 in (118.47 m)
- Beam: 50 ft (15 m)
- Draft: 21 ft 1 in (6.43 m)
- Installed power: 1 × Nordberg, TSM 6 diesel engine; 1,750 shp (1,300 kW)
- Propulsion: 1 × propeller
- Speed: 11.5 kn (21.3 km/h; 13.2 mph)
- Capacity: 3,945 t (3,883 long tons) DWT; 9,830 cu ft (278 m^{3}) (refrigerated); 227,730 cu ft (6,449 m^{3}) (non-refrigerated)
- Complement: 15 Officers; 70 Enlisted
- Armament: 1 × 3 in (76 mm)/50 caliber dual purpose gun (DP); 6 × 20 mm (0.8 in) Oerlikon anti-aircraft (AA) cannons

USS Muskingum (AK-198/T-AK-198) was an Alamosa-class cargo ship that was constructed for the US Navy under a US Maritime Commission (MARCOM) contract during the closing period of World War II. She supported the end-of-war Navy effort. On 7 March 1946 Muskingum was placed in service under bareboat charter with the US Army under the Shipping Control Authority for the Japanese Merchant Marine with a Japanese crew. In 1950, she was reactivated and placed into service with the Military Sea Transportation Service as USNS Muskingum (T-AK-198) until being struck from the Navy list in 1973. She was ultimately transferred to the Trust Territory of the Pacific Islands (TTPI) and the Republic of Palau.

== Construction ==
Muskingum, a type C1-M-AV1 cargo ship was laid down under a MARCOM contract, MC hull 2152, by Globe Shipbuilding Co., Superior, Wisconsin, 26 January 1944, and launched on 30 June 1944; sponsored by Mrs. Henry Larson. Muskingum was then completed at Samuelson Ship Yard, Beaumont, Texas. She was commissioned on 24 April 1945, at Houston, Texas.

== Service history ==
=== World War II-related service ===
After shakedown, she departed Gulfport, Mississippi, 26 May 1945 with cargo for the Pacific Ocean. She arrived at Subic Bay, Philippine Islands, 4 August 1945 via the Panama Canal and Manus, the Admiralty Islands. The next few months were spent in carrying passengers and freight between Philippine ports.

She departed Tacloban, Leyte, 24 January 1946, arriving Yokohama 31 January. The ship was decommissioned 7 March 1946 and turned over to the War Shipping Administration (WSA) for transfer to the U.S. Army Transportation Corps on a bareboat charter basis. She was stricken from the Navy List 5 June 1946.

=== Army service ===
Muskingum was given the Army designation V-208 and operated between ports in Japan, Korea, and the Mariana Islands under control of the Shipping Control Authority for the Japanese Merchant Marine (SCAJAP) with overall control exercised by Supreme Commander of Allied Forces, Japan. Muskingum was operated by Japanese until 1 July 1950 when title was transferred to Navy.

== MSTS service ==
Muskingum was reinstated on the Navy List for operations under Military Sea Transportation Service (MSTS) WesPac (Western Pacific). During the Korean War, she carried supplies between Japan and Korea.

In 1951, Muskingum, designated T-AK-198, was under control of MSTS Far East, operating out of Japan. Besides providing logistical support for U.S. forces in Korea, Muskingum carried supplies to American and Allied forces in South Vietnam.

=== Decommissioning ===
Muskingum continued with service with the Military Sea Transportation Service (MSTS) until she was struck from the Navy List on 15 June 1973.

== Merchant service ==
On 4 October 1973, title was returned to the Maritime Administration, successor to the Maritime Commission and loaned to the United States Department of Interior for TTPI use. The ship was operated by the Palau Shipping Company, Inc., a Trust Territory entity, on a time charter basis with a Micronesian crew. On 7 April 1982 Muskingum was permanently transferred to the Republic of Palau. According to the ABC Shipping Guide the ship was operated by Carolineship with a route Palau - Jakarta - Kobe - Palau.

The ship was scrapped in 1982.

== Honors and awards ==
Qualified Muskingum personnel were eligible for the following:

- American Campaign Medal
- Asiatic-Pacific Campaign Medal
- World War II Victory Medal
- Navy Occupation Service Medal (with Asia clasp)
- National Defense Service Medal
- Vietnam Service Medal
- Philippines Liberation Medal
- Republic of Vietnam Campaign Medal

== Notes ==
Citations

== Bibliography ==
Online resources

- "Muskingum (AK-198)". Dictionary of American Naval Fighting Ships. Naval History and Heritage Command. This article incorporates text from this source, which is in the public domain.
- "C1 Cargo Ships". Shipbuilding History. 28 August 2009. Archived from the original on 11 November 2016.
- "USNS Muskingum (T-AK-198)". NavSource. 18 April 2014.
- "Muskingum (AK-198)". United States Department of Transportation. Archived from the original on 21 November 2016.
