= USS Whidbey =

Cargo ship of the United States Navy

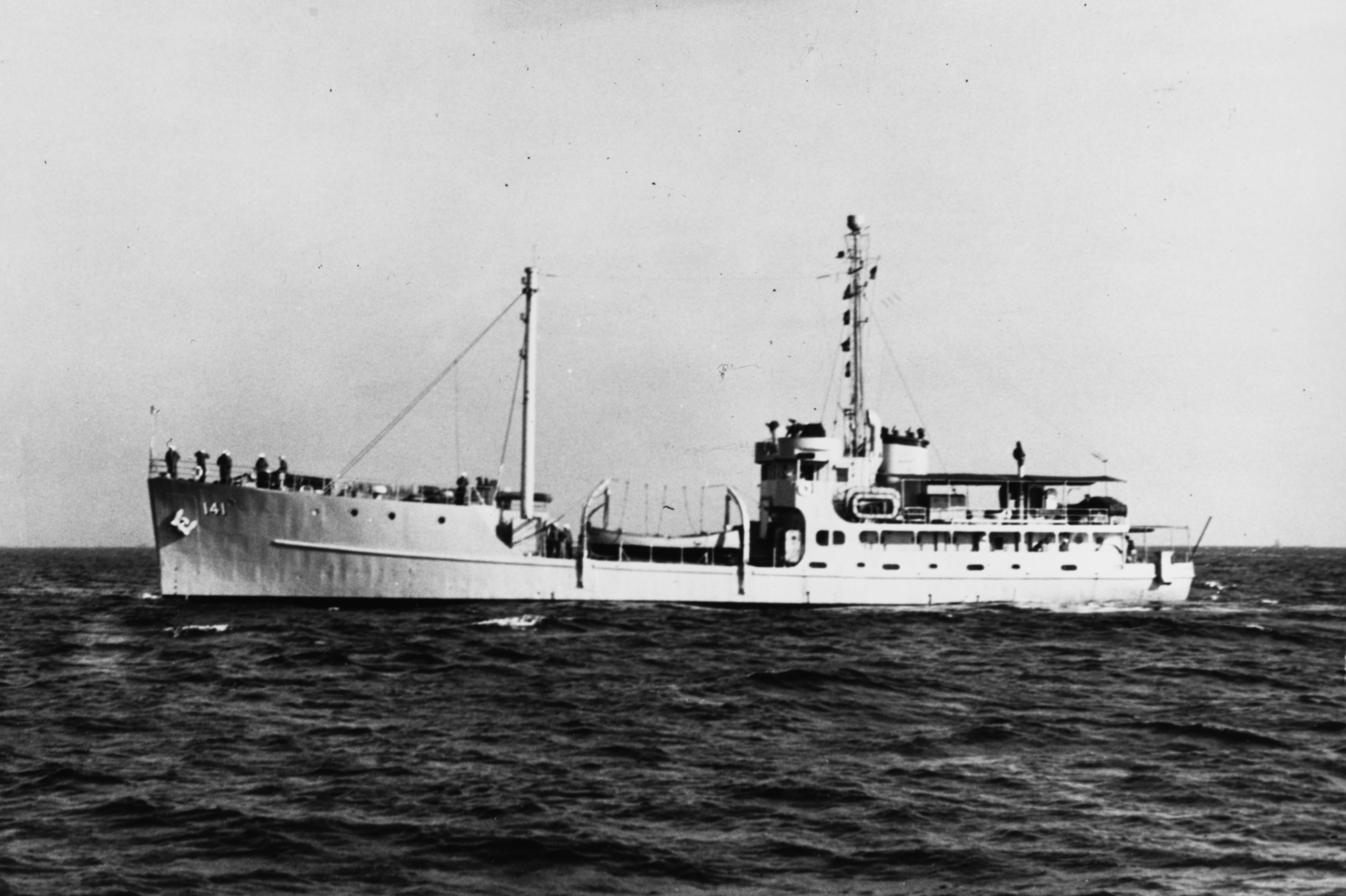

History

United States
- Name: USS Whidbey
- Namesake: Whidbey Island in Puget Sound, Washington
- Builder: Ingalls Shipbuilding Corp., Decatur, Alabama
- Laid down: 1944, at Decatur, Alabama
- Completed: as U.S. Army FS-395, 2 January 1945
- Acquired: by the U.S. Navy, 22 February 1947
- Commissioned: 1 January 1945 (Note: U.S. Army ships with Army or Civilian crews were not "commissioned" but those with U.S. Coast Guard officers and crew were.); 8 August 1947 as USS Whidbey (AG-141) at Naval Operating Base (NOB), Subic Bay, Philippine Islands
- Decommissioned: 16 November 1964, at Astoria, Oregon
- Stricken: 1 May 1969
- Fate: scrapped, 31 May 1969

General characteristics
- Type: Whidbey-class miscellaneous auxiliary
- Displacement: 540 tons light; 935 tons full load
- Length: 176 ft (54 m)
- Beam: 33 ft (10 m)
- Draft: 10 ft (3.0 m)
- Propulsion: two 500 hp General Motors diesel engines, twin screws
- Speed: 19 knots
- Complement: 24 enlisted
- Armament: not known

USS Whidbey (AG-141) was a Whidbey-class miscellaneous auxiliary acquired from the U.S. Army where it was designated USA FS-395 during World War II Army operations. She was transferred to the United States Navy in 1947, and the Navy assigned her to support the needs of the Pacific Ocean Trust Territory created as a result of the war.

Whidbey served the medical needs of natives and military personnel in the Trust Territory, and, when war broke out during the Korean War, Whidbey turned her attention to the tropical diseases contracted by American military personnel, treating their diseases before releasing them to return stateside.

== Built for the U.S. Army in Alabama ==
FS-395—an inter-island freighter and cargo vessel completed at Decatur, Alabama, by the Ingalls Shipbuilding Corp for the United States Army and commissioned with a U.S. Coast Guard officer and crew on 1 January 1945 to be assigned to the Pacific Area. The ship was subsequently inspected by the Navy and accepted for service at the Naval Operating Base (NOB), Subic Bay, Philippine Islands, on 22 February 1947.

FS-395 was later given the name Whidbey and classified a miscellaneous auxiliary, AG-141; she was commissioned at Naval Operating Base (NOB), Guam, while moored alongside SS Hamilton Victory on 8 August 1947.

== Supporting World War II Trust Territory ==
Later assigned to Service Division 51, Service Force, Pacific Fleet, Whidbey initially performed service under the auspices of the Commander in Chief, Pacific Fleet, who was given the collateral duty of High Commissioner of the Trust Territories of the Pacific Islands, assigned by the United Nations to the United States after World War II. Whidbey carried passengers, provisions, and mail to the islands in the territories, returning to Guam with copra and other native products.

== Caught and damaged in a storm ==
A highlight of Whidbey's first year in commission occurred shortly before Christmas of 1947. At 0945 on 22 December, the ship began doubling up all lines in anticipation of an approaching storm, while she was moored alongside the district oiler, YO-104, at Tomil Harbor, Yap Island; and at 1605 got underway for Guam, standing out to sea as the wind and sea began to rise menacingly. By 2200, the ship was maneuvering at various courses and speeds to keep headed into the wind; by 2330 the situation looked critical—all hands were ordered to don life jackets.

Whidbey fought the sea into the next morning. At 0042, a fire broke out in the bilges. Shutting down the port main engine, the auxiliary's crew battled the small fire for only a short time before they succeeded in putting it out, while, topside, heavy seas carried away one of the snip's lifeboats. The craft's port engine came to life only briefly before it had to be secured—leaving the ship operating on only one engine.

By 0413, heavy waves were breaking over the port and starboard sides of the ship; changing course at that instant, Whidbey suddenly ground onto a reef at 0418. All hands manned their abandon ship stations to prepare for any eventuality should the ship have foundered; but soundings were taken, and it looked as if the ship was on an even keel and not taking any water.

== Salvaging the grounded ship ==
Whidbey remained aground off the east coast of Yap, with no hope in sight until the afternoon of Christmas Day, when USS Tawakoni hove in sight at 1229. After spending the afternoon in trying to pull Whidbey off the reef, Tawakoni secured salvage operations that evening, but resumed them the next morning. Ultimately, Tawakoni succeeded in her task, towing Whidbey approximately 22 feet (6.7 m) and moving her astern on the 27th. On the 28th, the fleet tug set out for Guam at 1836 with the crippled auxiliary in tow. The little convoy arrived safely at Guam on the afternoon of the 31st.

Once repaired, Whidbey received a new task—a humanitarian mission. In an effort to look into the health and welfare of the inhabitants of all of the populated islands within the two and one-half million square miles of the Trust Territory, the Navy began a medical survey of those isles in 1948.

== Converted to a mini-hospital ==
The ship was converted from a small cargo vessel to a specially equipped floating clinic for service in the Trust Territory, departing Pearl Harbor in July 1948 with 45 men and eight officers that included two medical officers, a dentist, navy hospitalmen and laboratory technicians. The below deck spaces forward had an air conditioned sick bay capable of handling twenty patients at a time with X-Ray and laboratory facilities. For supporting island operations the ship had rubber boats and an amphibious DUKW. Whidbey arrived at the Navy Yard, Pearl Harbor, 24 January 1950 for maintenacnce before resuming the medical survey.

Whidbey's medical technicians "surveyed" thousands of islanders—men, women, and children—conducting parasitology tests, providing dental care, and taking blood tests and X-rays. Her medical teams not only provided those services on board ship, but also ashore as well, visiting the sick and the aged. Whidbey's performance of duty enabled the Navy to ascertain a complete picture of both the common and the rare diseases that occurred in the territories.

Whidbey's duties as a floating clinic came to an end with the completion of her last survey in late April 1951. Not only had Whidbey performed significant and helpful medical services to and for the islanders of the Trust Territories, but she had also gathered useful hydrographic data in the course of her cruises throughout the many isles of the territories.

== Conversion to epidemiological disease control ship ==
When the Navy relinquished its administrative duties to the U.S. Department of the Interior, Whidbey's role changed; her operations took on a different complexion in light of the Korean War that had broken out in the summer of 1950.

Whidbey, the value of her past service as a mini-hospital ship proved by experience in the Trust Territories, was overhauled at Yokosuka and converted from a medical survey vessel to a Fleet epidemiological disease control ship, becoming, in effect, a modern floating laboratory, with equipment and trained technicians capable of analyzing the most minute organism.

Deployed to Yokosuka, Japan, a port through which United States Marines were being rotated back to the United States from the combat zones in Korea, Whidbey's embarked Fleet Epidemiological Disease Control Unit No. 2 processed the homeward-bound marines for dysentery, malaria, or any other parasites contracted at the front. After the ship's medical team had obtained the samples, the marines sailed for the United States.

Working almost 24-hour shifts to obtain the results in minimum time, Whidbey's technicians then dispatched a report of results to the port of embarkation for each individual processed. As each transport arrived at her destination, quarantine officials there would thus be ready to treat whatever parasitical disease any marine had brought back from Korea. That process enabled those who had contracted malaria or any dormant infections to be cured before they returned to stateside posts or civilian life.

== China area operations ==
On 3 January 1952, Whidbey sailed for Taiwan (formerly Formosa) and carried out port visits to Keelung and Kaohsiung. She then shifted to the Nationalist Chinese naval base at Tsoying where, as "an ambassadress of good will and good health" she remained from 28 January to 5 May, her doctors working with those of the Chinese Navy. After touching at the Chinese naval base in the Pescadores, at Makung, until 15 May, Whidbey stopped briefly at Kaohsiung before she visited Hong Kong, en route to Sasebo. Whidbey again operated at Nationalist Chinese naval installations on Taiwan that summer.

Whidbey remained in the Far East, principally at Kobe and Yokosuka, through December 1953 and, placed in reserve on 1 July 1954, was assigned to the Pacific Reserve Fleet for overhaul and inactivation.

== Post-Korean War decommissioning ==
She was decommissioned on 15 November 1954. Placed in the Columbia River group of the Pacific Reserve Fleet, she remained there into the late 1950s. Struck from the Navy List on 1 May 1959, the unique craft was sold to Albert Heller on 31 May 1960 and subsequently scrapped.
