= USS Santa Clara =

Cargo ship of the United States Navy

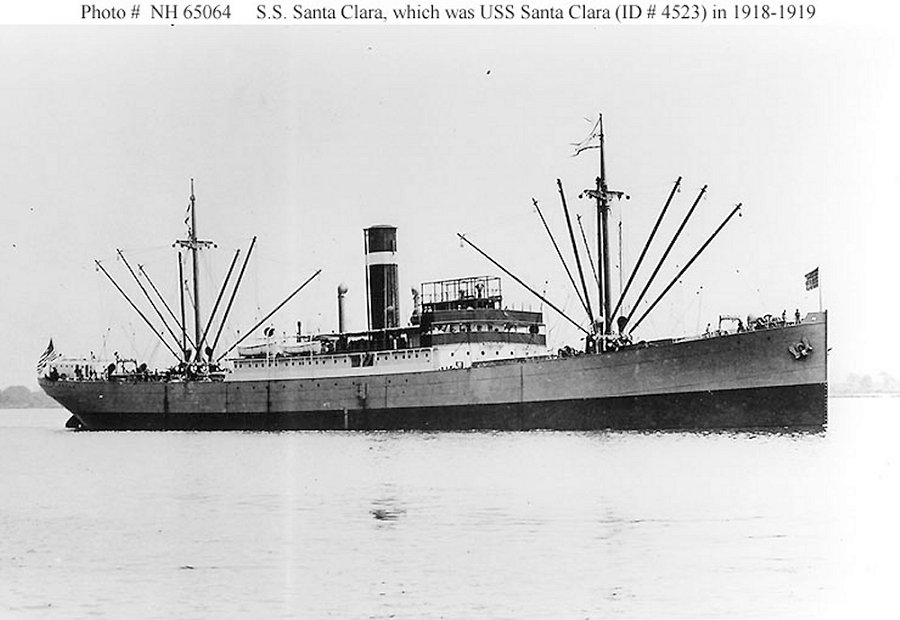

History

United States
- Name: USAT Santa Clara
- Namesake: Santa Clara, California
- Builder: William Cramp & Sons; Philadelphia, Pennsylvania
- Yard number: 400
- Completed: 1913
- Acquired: 28 October 1917
- Fate: transferred to U.S. Navy

History

United States
- Name: USS Santa Clara
- Acquired: 17 September 1918
- Commissioned: 12 October 1918
- Decommissioned: 19 August 1919
- Fate: returned to Grace Line

General characteristics (as USS Santa Clara)
- Class & type: Santa Cecilia-class freighter
- Displacement: 13,320 t
- Length: 420 ft 2 in (128.07 m)
- Beam: 53 ft 9 in (16.38 m)
- Draft: 34 ft 4.5 in (10.478 m)
- Depth of hold: 34 ft 2 in (10.41 m)
- Speed: 12 knots (22 km/h)
- Complement: 98
- Armament: 15-inch (130 mm) gun; 13-inch (76 mm) gun

USS Santa Clara (ID-4523) was a Santa Cecilia-class freighter for the United States Navy during World War I. In service for the United States Army she was known as USAT Santa Clara. Both before and after her World War I service she was known as SS Santa Clara for the Grace Line.

== Career ==
SS Santa Clara, a single-screw, steel-hulled freighter built during 1913 by William Cramp & Sons Ship and Engine Building Company of Philadelphia, was chartered by the United States Army on 28 October 1917 for voyages to the European war zone and given a Naval Armed Guard. Santa Clara was acquired by the Navy on 17 September 1918 from the Grace Line of New York, and commissioned on 12 October 1918 at Baltimore, Maryland.

Assigned to the Naval Overseas Transportation Service, Santa Clara arrived at Marseille on 15 November 1918, four days after the Armistice was signed, bringing 6,655 tons of general cargo. After returning to Baltimore on 24 December 1918, Santa Clara was transferred, on 18 January 1919, to the Cruiser and Transport Force of the Atlantic Fleet.

After overhaul, Santa Clara departed New York, on 23 March 1919, for the first of four post-war voyages to Europe returning troops to the United States from the war zone. Operating from New York, Santa Clara called at Brest, Bordeaux, Saint-Nazaire, and Pauillac, France, before completing her last voyage at Brooklyn on 3 August 1919. The following day, she was transferred from the Atlantic Fleet to the Third Naval District. Santa Clara was decommissioned on 19 August 1919 at New York and simultaneously returned to her owner.

Santa Clara's ultimate fate is not known.
