= U.S. Army ST-488 =

Harbor tugboat and museum ship

Coordinates: 49.4862°N 0.1245°E

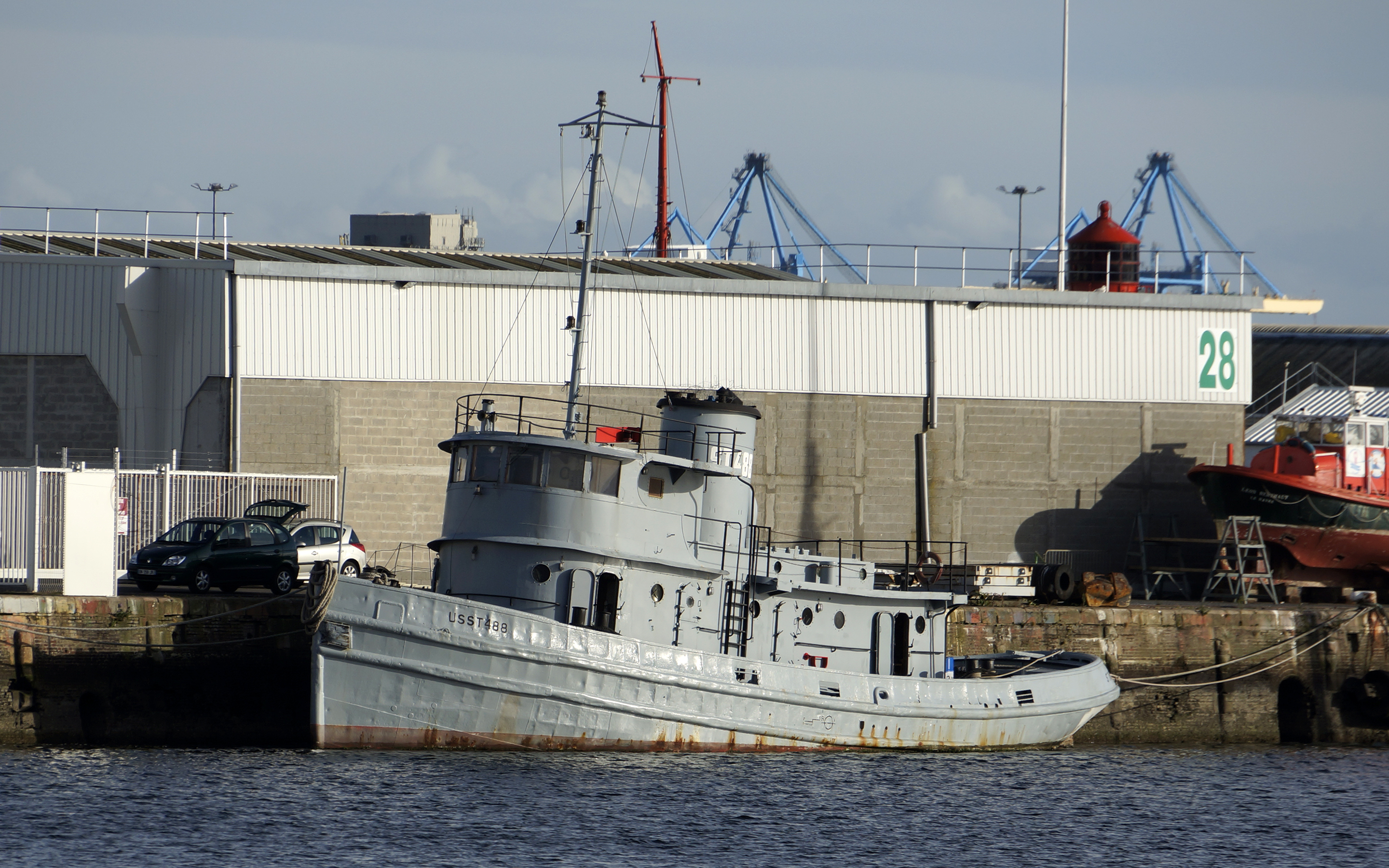
- ST-488 as museum ship.

History

United States
- Name: ST-488
- Operator: United States Army
- Builder: JK Welding Co., Brooklyn, New York City
- Yard number: 81
- Completed: May 1944
- Commissioned: 1944
- Decommissioned: 1946
- Status: Museum ship

General characteristics
- Class & type: Type 327-A Small Tug
- Displacement: 212 tons
- Length: 26 m (85 ft)
- Beam: 7 m (23 ft)
- Draft: 3 m (9.8 ft)
- Propulsion: 800 hp (597 kW) turbocharged diesel engine
- Armament: None

U.S. Army ST-488 is an 86 ft (26 m) harbor tugboat, design 327-A, of the numerical series 885-490 built by J.K. Welding & Co shipyards in Brooklyn, New York in 1944. The Army's ST small tugs ranged generally from about 55 ft (17 m) to 92 ft (28 m) in length as opposed to the larger seagoing LT tugs. ST-488 was delivered May 1944 and served in the United States Army from October 1944 to 1946 in the French port of Le Havre and on the floating docks of the U.S. Mulberry harbour of Arromanches in Normandy. After a civilian career at the port of Le Havre until the late 1970s, saved from wrecking by volunteers, she became a museum ship in 1994, part of Musée maritime of Le Havre and was classified a Monument historique (historical monument) in 1997.
