= USS LST-279 =

Landing ship of the US Navy

History

United States
- Name: LST-279
- Builder: American Bridge Company, Ambridge
- Laid down: 2 July 1943
- Launched: 19 September 1943
- Sponsored by: Mrs. Marion Ruth Warsack
- Commissioned: 25 October 1943
- Decommissioned: 27 June 1946
- Recommissioned: 5 April 1951
- Decommissioned: 14 June 1955
- Renamed: Berkeley County, 1 July 1955
- Namesake: Berkeley County, South Carolina; Berkeley County, West Virginia
- Stricken: 25 April 1960
- Identification: Callsign: NZPF; Hull number: LST-279
- Honors and awards: See Awards
- Fate: Transferred to the Republic of China, 30 June 1955

History

Republic of China
- Name: Chung Chie; (中啟)
- Acquired: 30 June 1955
- Commissioned: 30 June 1955
- Identification: Hull number: LST-218
- Fate: Active

General characteristics
- Class & type: LST-1-class tank landing ship
- Displacement: 1,625 long tons (1,651 t) light; 4,080 long tons (4,145 t) full
- Length: 328 ft (100 m)
- Beam: 50 ft (15 m)
- Draft: Unloaded: Bow: 2 ft 4 in (0.71 m); Stern: 7 ft 6 in (2.29 m); Loaded : Bow: 8 ft 2 in (2.49 m); Stern: 14 ft 1 in (4.29 m)
- Depth: 8 ft (2.4 m) forward, 14 ft 4 in (4.37 m) aft (full load)
- Propulsion: 2 General Motors 12-567 diesel engines, two shafts, twin rudders
- Speed: 12 knots (22 km/h; 14 mph)
- Boats & landing craft carried: Two or six LCVPs
- Troops: 14-16 officers, 131-147 enlisted men
- Complement: 7-9 officers, 104-120 enlisted men
- Armament: 2 × twin 40 mm gun mounts w/Mk.51 directors; 4 × single 40 mm gun mounts; 12 × single 20 mm gun mounts

USS Berkeley County (LST-279) was an LST-1-class tank landing ship built for the United States Navy during World War II. Named for counties in South Carolina and West Virginia, she was the only U.S. Naval vessel to bear the name.

== Construction and career ==
LST-279 was laid down on 2 July 1943 at Ambridge, Pennsylvania by the American Bridge Company; launched on 19 September 1943; sponsored by Miss Marion Ruth Warsack; and commissioned at New Orleans, Louisiana on 25 October 1943.

=== Service in the United States Navy ===
==== World War II, 1943–1945 ====
After fitting out at the Naval Station Algiers, New Orleans, LST-279 loaded supplies and ammunition before proceeding to St. Andrews Bay, Panama City, Florida for her shakedown cruise. While there, her crew practiced beach maneuvers and held communications and gunnery drills. In mid-November, she returned to New Orleans where the tank landing ship (LST) received minor alterations at the Pendleton Ship Yards. She then proceeded independently to New York, and from there on to Davisville, Rhode Island to load supplies and cargo. Moving on to Halifax, Nova Scotia in early January 1944, she got underway in convoy for Europe later that month.

After arriving at Plymouth, England on 7 February and unloading tank deck cargo, the LST engaged in various training maneuvers between Plymouth, Salcombe, and Dartmouth off the southern coast of England. Assigned to Flotilla 28 in May, the tank landing ship was placed under British operational control for the upcoming landings in France. She then spent the days immediately before the Normandy invasion in the western Solent, Southampton, undergoing further training with British troops.

On 6 June 1944, LST-279 moved from Southampton to Portsmouth, where she loaded British troops and vehicles before joining a convoy for Normandy. On the morning of 7 June, the tank landing ship beached and unloaded her charges in the Green sector of Juno Beach. Casualties then came on board for the return trip to Portsmouth. On her next convoy run, however, the tank landing ship ran into trouble. German E-boats, operating from Cherbourg, torpedoed the ocean tug Partridge (ATO-138) and closed the LST convoy. Before nearby escorts drove off the attackers, one E-boat torpedo narrowly missed LST-279, passing 20 feet from her bow, but went on to damage LST-538 instead. Over the next two months, LST-279 made over a dozen more shuttle trips, carrying troops, ammunition, and supplies from England to the beachheads in France.

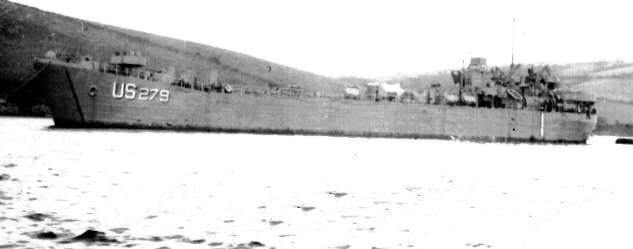
LST-279 off England in 1945

Starting in August 1944, she made routine operational trips from Portland, England, to the Normandy beaches and to the French ports of Rouen, Le Havre, Cherbourg, and Saint-Michel-en-Grève. By the time she departed for home in June 1945, LST-279 had made 74 Channel crossings in support of the Allied armies in Europe.

After unloading cargo at Norfolk, Virginia the tank landing ship proceeded to New Orleans for maintenance availability and repairs. Following a short post-repair cruise to Galveston, Texas LST-279 moved to Green Cove Springs, Florida on the St. Johns River in Florida, where she joined the Atlantic Reserve Fleet on 12 October 1945. LST-279 was decommissioned there on 27 June 1946.

==== Atlantic Fleet, 1951–1955 ====
On 20 July 1950 in consequence of the June 1950 invasion of South Korea by communist North Korea and the ensuing mobilization of units in the reserve fleet, the tank landing ship was tapped for activation the following year. On 5 April 1951, LST-279 was recommissioned at Green Cove Springs and reported to the Atlantic Fleet for duty. The tank landing ship operated out of Norfolk for the next three and a half years, carrying out a variety of training missions and hauling cargo up and down the east coast.

In January 1955 she sailed south, passed through the Panama Canal, and steamed to Long Beach, California. There, LST-279 commenced inactivation procedures after being transferred to the Pacific Reserve Fleet on 1 February. LST-279 was decommissioned at Long Beach on 14 June 1955.

Although named USS Berkeley County (LST-279) on 1 July 1955 she never returned to Navy service, and her name was struck from the Naval Vessel Register on 25 April 1960.

=== Service in the Republic of China Navy ===
On 30 June 1955, the tank landing ship was transferred to the Nationalist Chinese Navy, in which she served as ROCS Chung Chie (LST-218).

== Awards ==
LST-279 earned one battle star for World War II service.
