= Walt Disney World Railroad =

Steam railroad system in Walt Disney World

- Walt Disney World Railroad logo

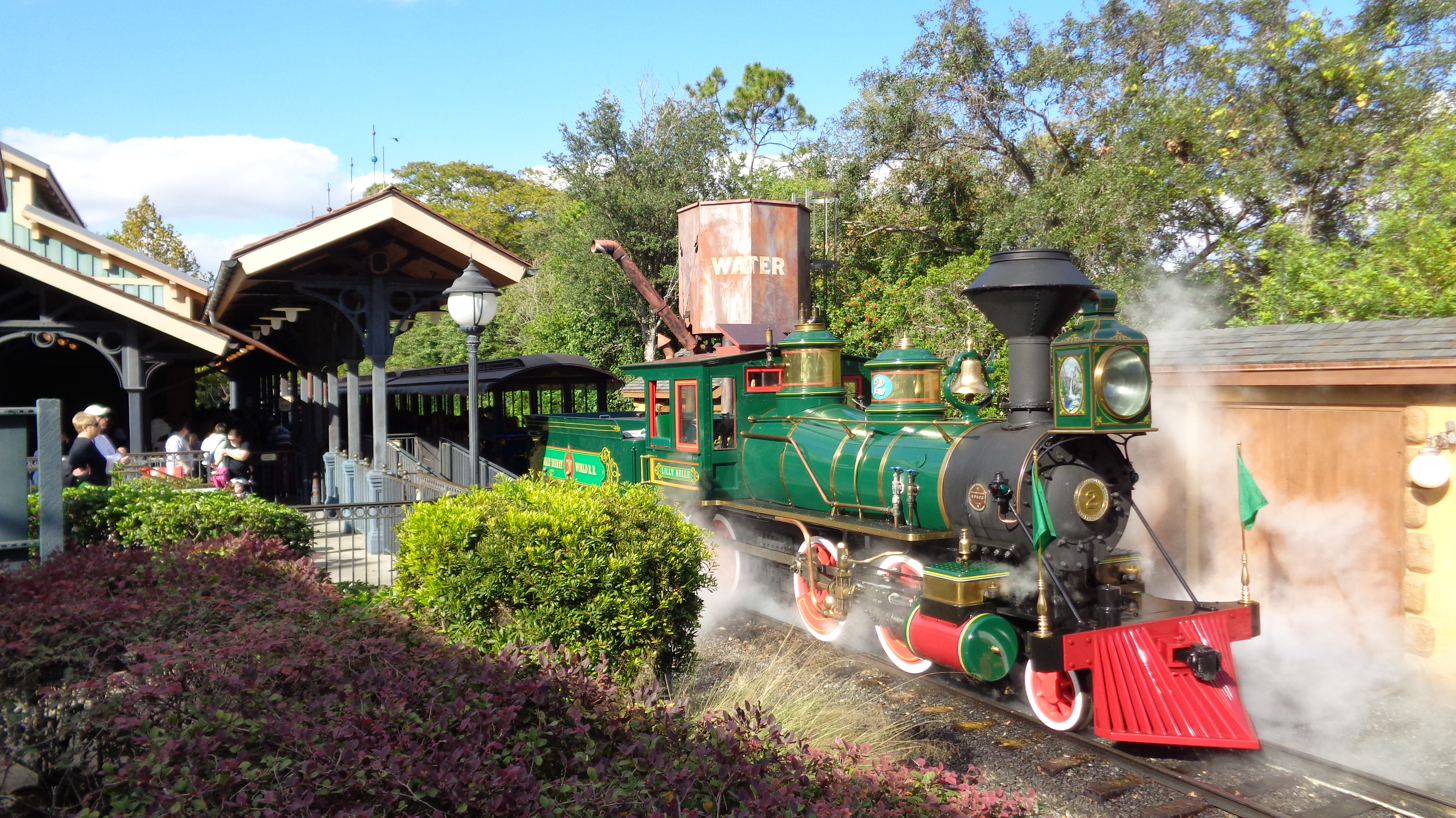
- The No. 2 Lilly Belle locomotive pulling out of Fantasyland Station in December 2016

Magic Kingdom
- Coordinates: 28.4164°N 81.5812°W (Main Street, U.S.A. Station); 28.4197°N 81.5851°W (Frontierland Station); 28.4211°N 81.5783°W (Fantasyland Station)
- Status: Operating
- Opening date: October 1, 1971

Ride statistics
- Attraction type: Heritage railroad
- Manufacturer: Baldwin Locomotive Works
- Designer: WED Enterprises
- Speed: 10 mph (16 km/h)
- Vehicle type: Train
- Vehicles: 4 steam locomotives; 20 passenger cars
- Riders per vehicle: 375 per train
- Duration: About 20:00
- Ticket: D (formerly)
- No. of tracks: Single
- Track gauge: 3 ft (914 mm)
- Track length: 1.5 miles (2.4 km)
- Sponsor: Auto-Train Corporation (1976–1977)
- Wheelchair accessible
- Closed captioning available

The Walt Disney World Railroad (WDWRR) is a heritage railroad and attraction located within the Magic Kingdom theme park of Walt Disney World in Bay Lake, Florida, United States. A 3-foot (914 mm) narrow-gauge railway, its route is 1.5 miles (2.4 km) in length and encircles most of the park, with train stations in three different park areas. The rail line, constructed by WED Enterprises, operates with four historic steam locomotives originally built by the Baldwin Locomotive Works (BLW) in Philadelphia, Pennsylvania. It takes about 20 minutes for each train to complete a round trip on the WDWRR's mainline loop. On a typical day, the railroad has two trains in operation; on busy days, it has three trains.

The WDWRR's development was led by Roger E. Broggie, who also oversaw the construction of the Disneyland Railroad in Disneyland in Anaheim, California. The attraction's locomotives were acquired from the Ferrocarriles Unidos de Yucatán, a narrow-gauge railroad system in Mexico. After being shipped to the United States, they were altered to resemble locomotives built in the 1880s and restored to operating condition. Each locomotive was also given a set of passenger cars, which were built from scratch.

The WDWRR opened to the public for the first time on October 1, 1971, the same day that the Magic Kingdom park opened. Since then, the WDWRR has become one of the world's most popular steam-powered railroads, with about 3.7 million passengers each year. On July 7, 2025, the WDWRR went into shuttle mode for the first time since the early 1990s, running one train between the Main Street, U.S.A. and Fantasyland sections to accommodate the Villains Land expansion in the Frontierland section.

== History ==
=== Discovery in Mexico ===
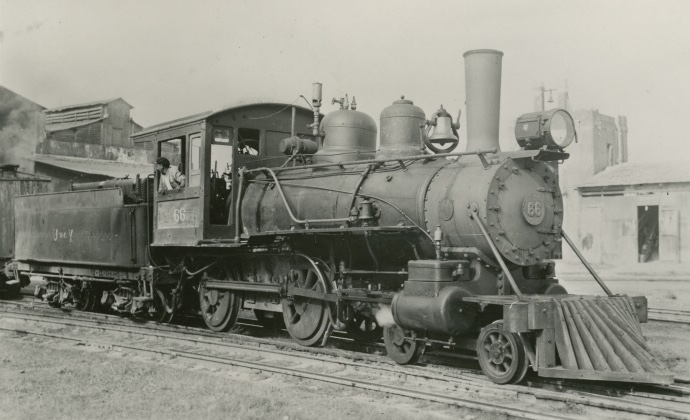
A typical locomotive on the Ferrocarriles Unidos de Yucatán in Mexico, where the locomotives for the WDWRR were found

The development of the Walt Disney World Railroad (WDWRR) from the late 1960s to its opening in 1971 was overseen by Roger E. Broggie, vice president and general manager of Mapo, Inc., WED Enterprises' research and manufacturing branch. Broggie previously supervised the building of the Disneyland Railroad in Disneyland in Anaheim, California. From his experience with the railroad at Disneyland, Broggie determined that it was better to use existing steam locomotives, rather than building them entirely from scratch like the Disneyland Railroad's first two locomotives.

In 1968, he contacted rail historian Gerald M. Best who recently wrote Mexican Narrow Gauge, a book containing information about locomotives that could be obtained from a railroad boneyard in Mérida, Yucatán, Mexico, owned by the Ferrocarriles Unidos de Yucatán. This was a 3 ft (914 mm) narrow-gauge system, the same gauge as the Disneyland Railroad.

In 1969, Broggie, along with fellow Disney employee and railroad-building expert Earl Vilmer, went to Mérida to investigate. They determined that four locomotives built by Baldwin Locomotive Works (BLW) could potentially be salvaged, along with a fifth locomotive built by American Locomotive Company (ALCO) of Pittsburgh, Pennsylvania (formerly Pittsburgh Locomotive and Car Works), which was on display in front of the railroad company's headquarters. Broggie paid a total of US$32,750 for all five locomotives ($8,000 for each of the four locomotives in the boneyard plus an additional $750 for the fifth locomotive). The locomotives, along with an assortment of brass fittings and other spare parts given away for free, were immediately shipped by rail back to the United States.

=== Restoration in Florida ===
The five locomotives and spare parts acquired by Roger Broggie were sent to the Tampa Ship Repair & Dry Dock Company in Tampa, Florida, to receive the aesthetic and mechanical restorations necessary to run on the planned WDWRR. (Note: But upon arriving at the Tampa Ship Repair & Dry Dock Company at night, one of the locomotives' number plate was stolen before Broggie and his team unloaded the locomotives.) At the time, this was the closest facility to the Walt Disney World site in Bay Lake, Florida with the space and equipment needed to accommodate full-size railroad rolling stock. Here, Transportation Superintendent Earl Vilmer, who had accompanied Broggie on his trip to Mexico, along with Project Engineer Bob Harpur and the facility's Machinist Supervisor George Britton, were tasked with the project's completion.

The general idea for the restoration was to make the locomotives appear as if they were built in the 1880s. This would include new diamond-shaped smokestacks and square-shaped headlamps. The original, dilapidated boilers of the four locomotives built by BLW were replaced with new, smaller boilers built by Dixon Boiler Works in Los Angeles, California. Their worn-out wood and steel cabs were replaced with new ones made of fiberglass, and they were given new tenders, which used the trucks from the originals. Many of the smaller original parts on the locomotives such as the domes and brass bells on top of the boilers, the frames, the wheels, and the side rods were successfully refurbished and retained. The locomotives' fireboxes were also modified to burn ultra-low-sulfur diesel oil instead of bunker oil. Replicas of their builder's plates were also made to replace the originals. The restoration cost of the four BLW locomotives and their tenders was around $125,000 each.

The ALCO locomotive acquired along with them could not be restored. Built in 1902, this locomotive was the oldest of the five locomotives purchased and was determined to have too many problems to be rebuilt. Some of its parts were cannibalized to help restore the four BLW locomotives, including its smokestack, which was fitted to the WDWRR's No. 4 locomotive. Afterwards, the remains of the ALCO locomotive were stored out of use at WED Enterprises in Glendale, California, until they were sold to an unknown locomotive broker in the mid-1980s.

=== Opening to present day ===
The restoration of the WDWRR's four locomotives, as well as the construction of five new open-air Narragansett-style excursion cars for each of them (twenty in total), was completed in less than two years. The first completed set of five passenger cars was delivered to the Magic Kingdom park during April 1971 and the first completed locomotive arrived on May 15, 1971, several months before the park's opening. Like the steam trains running on the Disneyland Railroad during Disneyland's opening day on July 17, 1955, the steam trains for the WDWRR were the first attraction in the Magic Kingdom park to be finished, and they have been operating in the park ever since it opened on October 1, 1971. D tickets were required to ride on the WDWRR until 1982 when they were discontinued in favor of the pay-one-price admission system, allowing visitors to experience all of the park's attractions, including the WDWRR. George Britton, who was instrumental in getting the WDWRR's locomotives refurbished, became the railroad's foreman from the time the railroad opened until his retirement on April 6, 2006. He eventually died on October 10, 2022. The WDWRR would eventually become one of the most popular steam-powered railroads in the world with about 3.7 million passengers each year. It is run by Main Street Operations, which also operates the Main Street Vehicles in the Main Street, U.S.A. section. Between 1976 and 1977, the Auto-Train Corporation sponsored the WDWRR.

For the first few months after the WDWRR opened to the public, Main Street, U.S.A. Station at the Magic Kingdom park's entrance, modeled after the former Victorian-style Saratoga Springs station in Saratoga Springs, New York, was the only stop for passengers along its route, making only complete round trips possible. On May 1, 1972, the first Frontierland Station opened near the Pecos Bill Tall Tale Inn and Café in the Frontierland section on the park's western edge. It was one of the last changes made to the WDWRR prior to the retirement of Roger Broggie on October 1, 1973.

The WDWRR's third station, Mickey's Birthdayland Station, opened on June 18, 1988, in the Magic Kingdom park's brand-new Mickey's Birthdayland section adjacent to the Fantasyland section in the park's northeast corner, and the railroad was briefly renamed Mickey's Birthdayland Express to promote it. This also created a new connection between the Fantasyland and Tomorrowland sections for park guests. When the Mickey's Birthdayland section was renamed Mickey's Starland in 1990, Mickey's Toyland in late 1995, and Mickey's Toontown Fair in 1996, the signage for its WDWRR station changed three times, but the station's structure remained the same.

In November 1990, the original Frontierland Station was demolished to make way for the new Splash Mountain log flume attraction. During construction of the Splash Mountain attraction, the WDWRR was temporarily renamed Backtrack Express and operated a single train in a shuttle mode along the section of track between the Main Street, U.S.A. and Mickey's Starland sections. Additionally, some of the passenger car's seat benches were flipped in the opposite direction to accommodate passengers who do not want to face forwards while the trains are going in reverse. The original water tower in the Frontierland section was also removed and the current one was built in the Mickey's Starland section. The current Frontierland station, which opened in December 1991 between the Splash Mountain and Big Thunder Mountain Railroad attractions, returned the WDWRR back to its Grand Circle Tour mode.

Around 2002–2003, the Main Street, U.S.A. Station was used as a stage show for the Magic Kingdom park's daily opening ceremonies, which initially took place at Cinderella Castle in the 1990s and early 2000s, but moved in response to the low park attendance and cutbacks made due to the September 11 attacks in 2001. Main Street, U.S.A. Station is where the train arrive with Disney employees dressed up as Disney characters on board. They disembark the train after it stopped for them to greet the guests. On January 9, 2017, the daily opening ceremonies no longer take place at Main Street, U.S.A. Station and moved back to Cinderella Castle.

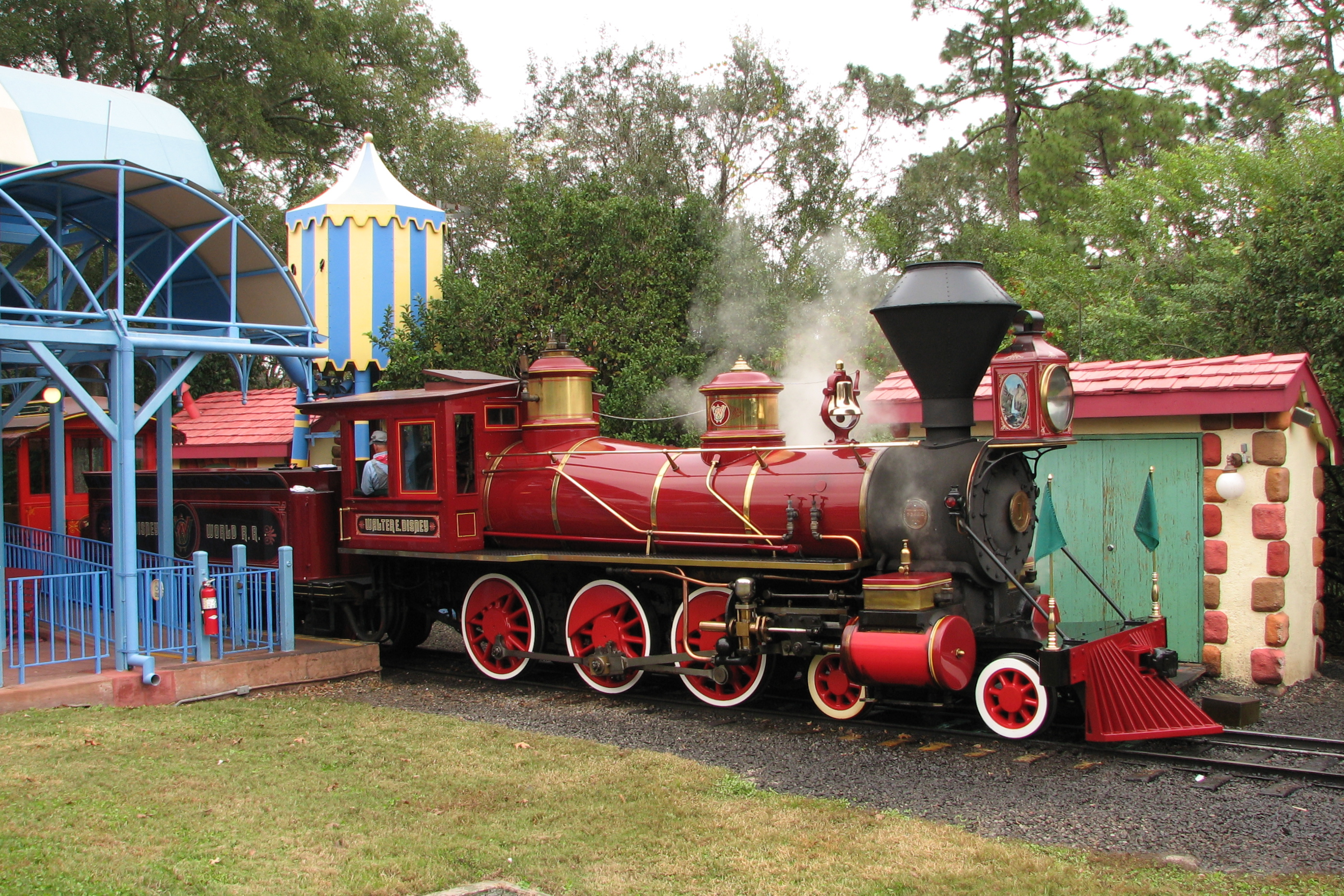
The WDWRR's Mickey's Toontown Fair Station in 2008 prior to its transformation into Fantasyland Station in 2012

In mid 2004, Mickey's Toontown Fair Station was demolished and completely rebuilt with a much shorter canopy. On February 11, 2011, the Mickey's Toontown Fair section closed to make way for the new Storybook Circus area, part of a new expansion of the Fantasyland section. Mickey's Toontown Fair Station was demolished and the current Fantasyland Station, built on the former's site, opened on March 12, 2012. The new station's area was nicknamed Carolwood Park, paying tribute to Walt Disney's Carolwood Pacific Railroad. In April 2012, the water tower and maintenance buildings adjacent to Fantasyland Station were re-themed to match the station's new design. These were the last additions made to the WDWRR before the death of Bob Harpur in November 2012.

In August 2018, a billboard sign promoting the upcoming TRON Lightcycle / Run roller coaster attraction was added next to the WDWRR's track in the Fantasyland section. On December 3, 2018, the WDWRR temporarily closed to accommodate construction of the TRON attraction in the Tomorrowland section. On December 23, 2022, the WDWRR reopened with a new tunnel adjacent to the TRON attraction. While the WDWRR was closed, many of the wooden railroad ties along the route were replaced with composite plastic ties for another 25 years of track maintenance. The stations in the Main Street, USA and Frontierland sections were repainted with new colors. The water tower at Fantasyland Station was completely refurbished. The electricity power at all three WDWRR stations were redone. During a media preview for the attraction's reopening the previous day, the Magic Kingdom employees were offered to board the new WDWRR ride experience.

On January 23, 2023, the Splash Mountain attraction containing one of the WDWRR's tunnels permanently closed to be rethemed as the new Tiana's Bayou Adventure log flume attraction. Additionally, the portion of the ride finale inside the tunnel was covered up. In early September, the original exit staircase at Frontierland Station was dismantled to accommodate the retheme. The passengers disembarking at Frontierland Station have to take a detour to the entrance stairs. At the same time, the TRON billboard was replaced with the new Fantasyland Storybook Circus farewell sign. On September 18, the WDWRR, along with several other Magic Kingdom attractions, temporarily closed due to a black bear that entered the Frontierland section. Around December, Frontierland Station began to be rethemed and renovated to match the future Tiana's Bayou Adventure attraction. In January 2024, the new staircase exit at Frontierland Station opened and it temporarily replaced the original staircase entrance, which was completely demolished. The new entrance stairs at Frontierland Station opened on April 23, 2024, followed by the opening of Tiana's Bayou Adventure attraction on June 28, 2024.

From January to September 2025, the Main Street, U.S.A. Station's upper-level balcony was completely refurbished with new flooring tiles and new paint. On July 7, 2025, the WDWRR resumed shuttle-mode operation, running between the Main Street, USA and Fantasyland sections, to accommodate the Villains Land expansion in the Frontierland section with Frontierland Station temporarily closing. (Note: Additionally, the new Main Street to Fantasyland on-board narration spiel features the voice of Stitch, voiced by Chris Sanders, from Lilo & Stitch.) On July 12, the WDWRR tracks near the former Rivers of America section were removed. On September 28, 2026, the WDWRR was closed to replace the tracks at Main Street, U.S.A. Station, which had not been removed since the attraction's closure from late 2018 to late 2022. It reopened on October 29, 2026.

== Ride experience ==
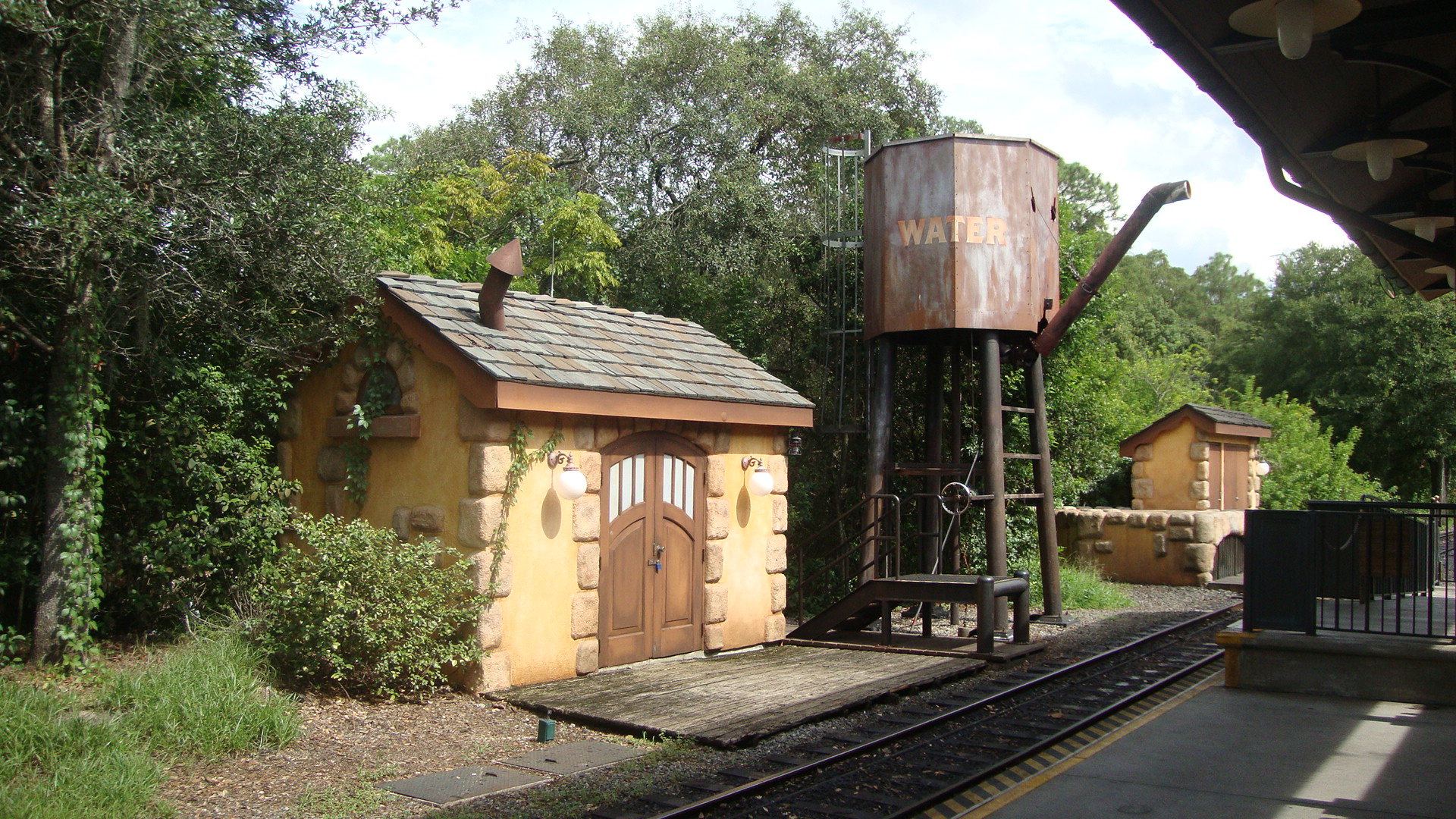
The WDWRR's water tower at Fantasyland Station

Beginning at Main Street, U.S.A. Station adjacent to the Magic Kingdom park's entrance, the trains of the WDWRR travel along its single track in a clockwise direction on its circular route, which spans 7,809 feet (2,380 m) around the park. It takes about 20 minutes for each train to complete a round trip on the WDWRR's mainline and each of them arrives at each station every 4-7 minutes. On any given day, either two or three trains run, with two running on a typical day and three on a busy day, depending on the number of park guests. Since 1988, each train had a recorded on-board narration spiel, highlighting the park's lands and attractions. Ron Schneider, Earl Boen, and Darryl Pickett have formerly provided their voice for the various versions of the trip, with the current voice being Corey Burton since late 2022. While passengers are waiting at Main Street, USA Station for the next train, they are able to observe the mutoscopes, medallions, and arcade machines in the waiting area. On the first floor of Main Street, USA Station, there are four commemorative plaques, representing information about each of the WDWRR's locomotives. The speed limit of the WDWRR is 10 mph (16 km/h).

As the train departs Main Street, U.S.A. Station, it passes the Magic Kingdom monorail station, crosses an access road in the Adventureland section, travels over a small bridge, and enters a small tunnel situated near the Pirates of the Caribbean dark ride attraction. After crossing a second access road in the Frontierland section and entering a tunnel through the Tiana's Bayou Adventure attraction in which its finale can be viewed, the train arrives at Frontierland Station. While the train is awaiting to depart, a sound effect of a telegraph operator using a telegraph key to enter Morse code can be heard at the station, transmitting Walt Disney's 1955 Disneyland dedication speech.

Continuing down the line, the train passes the Big Thunder Mountain Railroad mine train roller coaster attraction and traverses a fully functional swing bridge, which crosses a canal leading to a dry dock area and the Seven Seas Lagoon. This bridge was originally located in Wabasso, Florida, and was previously owned by the Florida East Coast Railway. (Note: Prior to July 2025, the Liberty Belle Riverboat could be seen in the Rivers of America, floating side by side with the train and sounding their whistles at each other.) After the train runs through the park's northern area, where live alligators and deer are occasionally spotted, the train goes under an overpass, passes the spur line leading to the WDWRR's roundhouse where its trains are stored and maintained, and arrives at its next stop at Fantasyland Station. While the train is stopped at this station, where the railroad's water tower is used to refill the tender if needed, the train crew will perform a boiler blowdown on the locomotive and the maintenance crew will service it.

In the final segment of the train's journey around the park, it enters a two-percent grade tunnel adjacent to the TRON Lightcycle / Run roller coaster attraction. Additionally, there are some windows on the left side of the tunnel where passengers can get a glimpse of the TRON Lightcycle / Run roller coaster track. After exiting the tunnel, the train passes the Space Mountain and Walt Disney's Carousel of Progress attractions in the Tomorrowland section, and travels over a small bridge before it arrives back at Main Street, U.S.A. Station. This completes what the park refers to as The Grand Circle Tour.

Walt Disney World Railroad stations

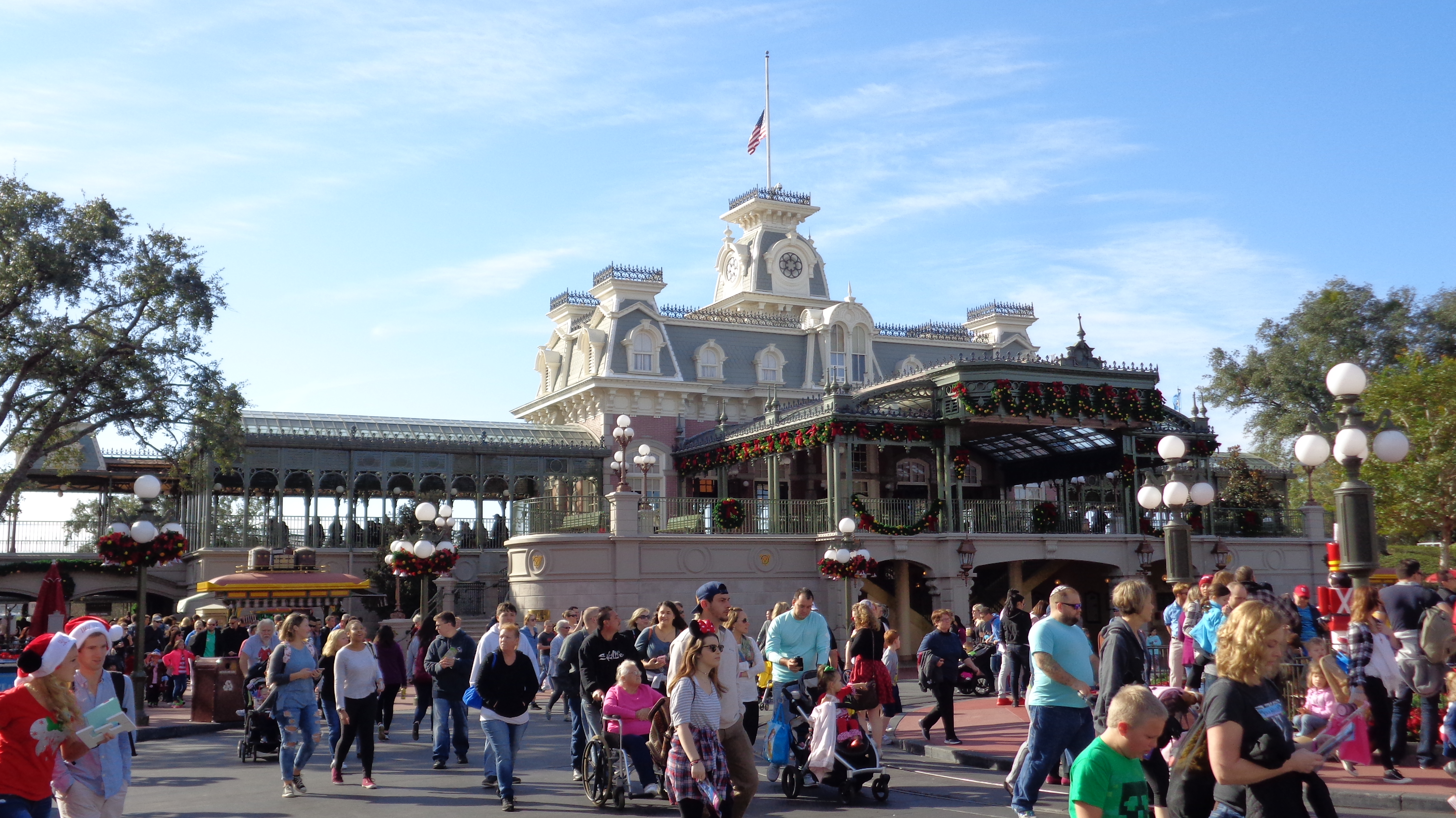
Main Street, U.S.A. Station

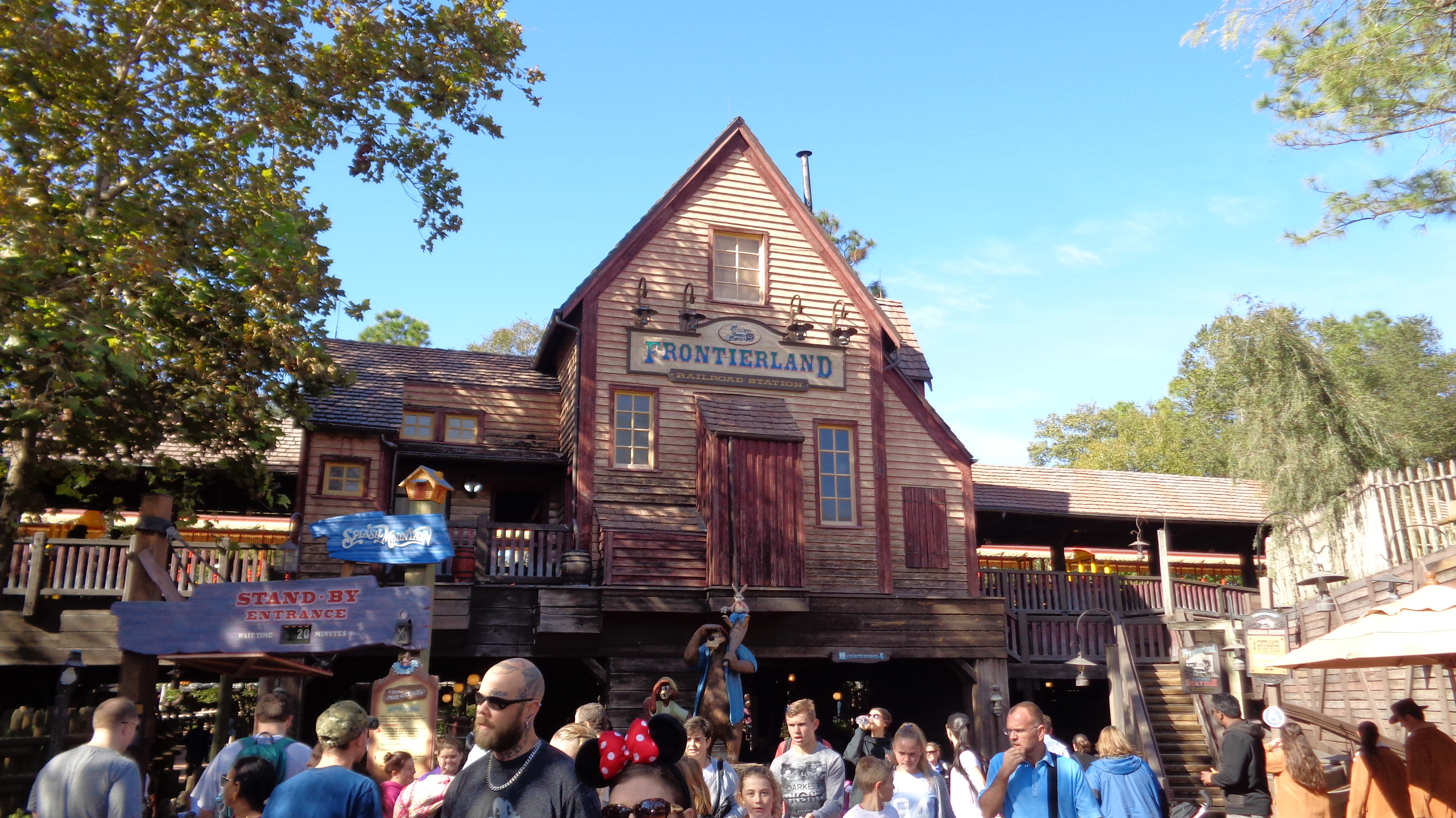
Frontierland Station

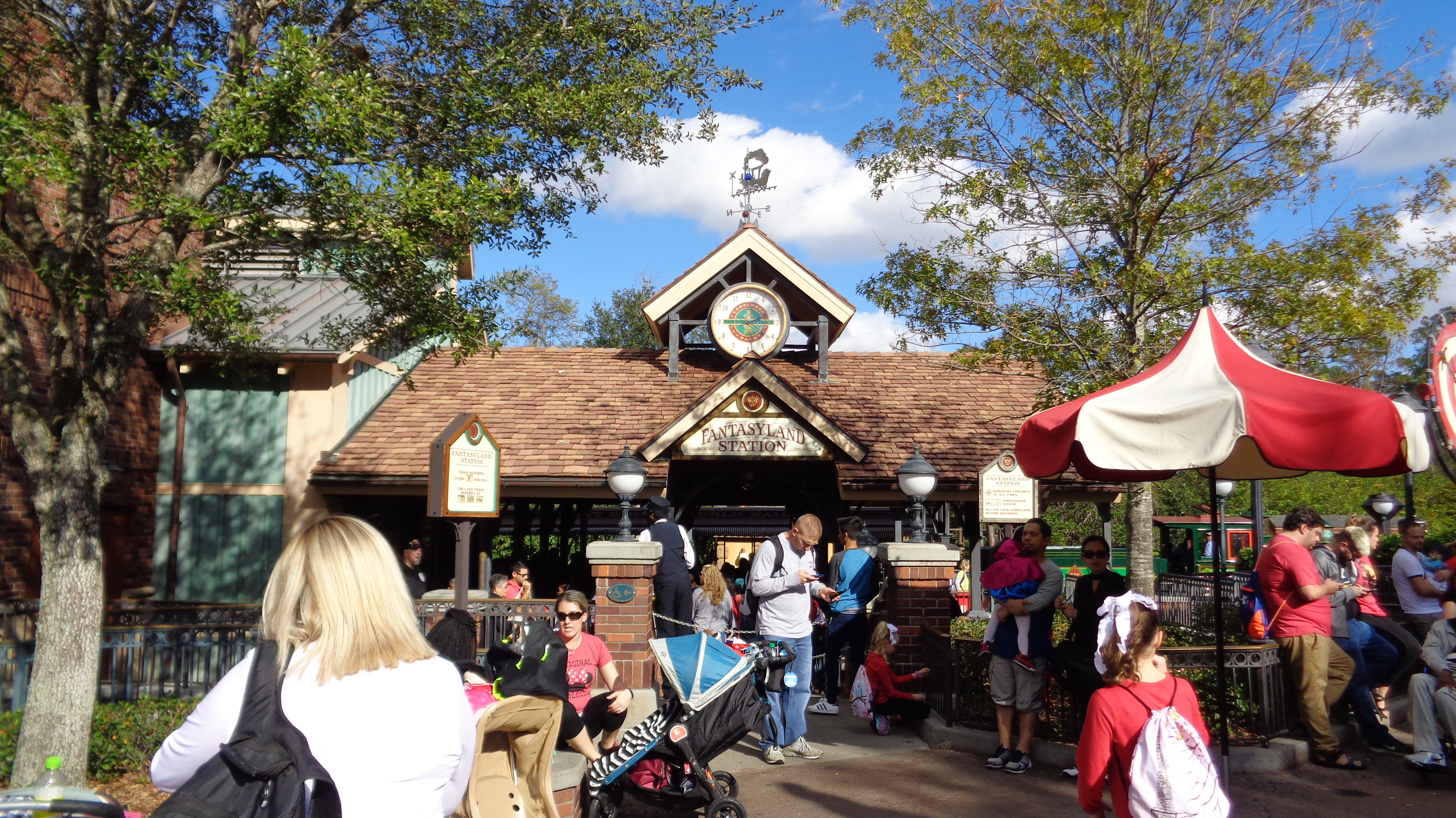
Fantasyland Station

Personal strollers and wheelchairs were allowed on board the train, excluding rental Disney strollers and electric conveyance vehicles. All of the stations had disability ramps access for the wheelchair passengers to board the train. Since October 1999, a separately-priced tour of the WDWRR named Disney's The Magic Behind Our Steam Trains Tour has been available once on Sundays-Thursdays, and includes access to the railroad's otherwise-restricted roundhouse. At the end of the tour, the guests were originally given free railroad spikes as souvenirs, but due to the September 11 attacks, the spikes were dropped in favor of the lapel pins. In 2020, the tour was suspended due to the COVID-19 pandemic.

== Rolling stock ==
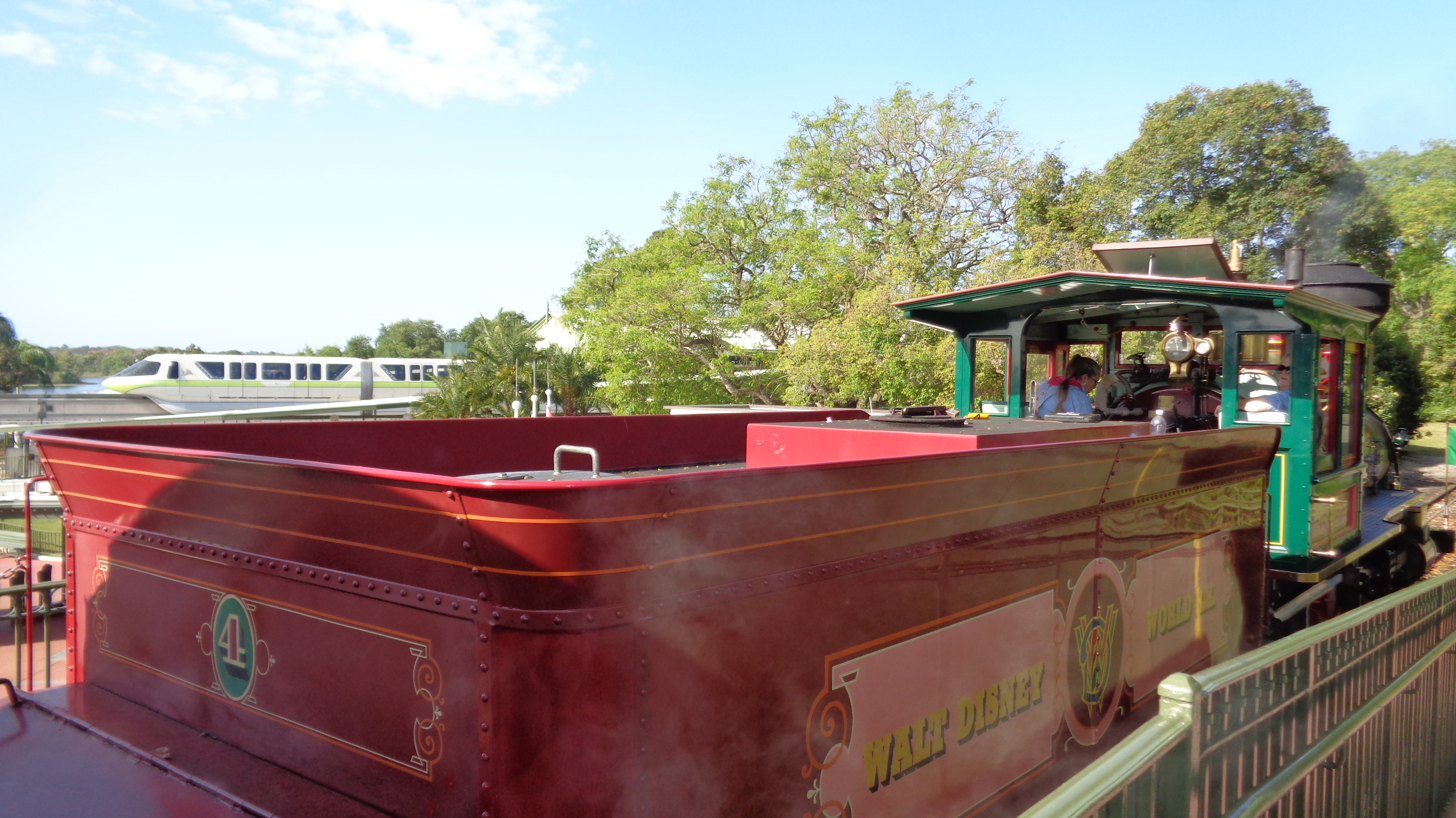
The back of the WDWRR's No. 4 locomotive's tender

When working on the line, each WDWRR locomotive consumes 25 US gallons (95 L) of fuel and 200 US gallons (760 L) of water per hour, and each tender can hold 664 US gallons (2,510 L) of fuel and 1,837 US gallons (6,950 L) of water. Each of the four locomotives takes on water at Fantasyland Station every three or four trips and pulls a set of five passenger cars with seating capacity for 75 passengers per car, for a total of 375 passengers per train. Each passenger car has 15 benches, which can hold 3-5 passengers each. The front passenger car had a disability ramp for the two wheelchair passengers to be loaded on. Occasionally, locomotives and their passenger car sets will be switched when either one is out of service for maintenance, overhauls, refurbishments, or repairs.

The locomotives do not contain brakes, and so must rely on those of the passenger cars to avoid rough stops. The locomotives' tenders each have an automatic train control box underneath, which detect red light frequencies from the signals' transmitters along the track and apply the passenger car's brakes. In September 2007, all four locomotives were equipped with an E-stop control box. From 2002 to 2017, there were no handrails and side panels on most of the 200 series train set's left side to allow Disney employees, dressed up as Disney characters, to disembark at Main Street, U.S.A. Station for the daily park opening ceremonies.

In 1997, another locomotive arrived at Walt Disney World, where it was named after former Disney animator and rail enthusiast Ward Kimball. However, it was deemed too small for the WDWRR's operations and was instead sent to the Cedar Point & Lake Erie Railroad in the Cedar Point amusement park in Sandusky, Ohio, where it now operates as their No. 1 locomotive, the Randol D.. Between 1997 and 2003, all four locomotives received major refurbishments at the Tweetsie Railroad in Blowing Rock, North Carolina, costing nearly $4 million. Since 2010, overhauling services have taken place at the Strasburg Rail Road in Strasburg, Pennsylvania.

Walt Disney World Railroad rolling stock details
Number and name	Namesake	Image	Wheel arrangement	Date built	Builder	Serial number	Passenger cars	Date entered service	Status	Notes
No. 1 Walter E. Disney	Walt Disney	A red steam locomotive with a 4-6-0 wheel arrangement (four leading wheels, six driving wheels, and no trailing wheels) and its tender	4-6-0 (Ten wheeler)	May 1925	Baldwin Locomotive Works	58444	Red passenger cars (100 series)	October 1, 1971	Operational	During its overhaul at the Strasburg Rail Road from 2016 to 2020, this locomotive received a new boiler. It pulled ten passenger cars during one of its test runs in November 2022. Before being overhauled, this used to be the WDWRR's tallest locomotive at 11 feet 11 inches (3.6 m) hence its smokestack.
No. 2 Lilly Belle	Lillian Disney	A green steam locomotive with a 2-6-0 wheel arrangement (two leading wheels, six driving wheels, and no trailing wheels) and its tender	2-6-0 (Mogul)	September 1928	Baldwin Locomotive Works	60598	Green passenger cars (200 series)	October 1, 1971	Operational	This was the first WDWRR locomotive to be delivered to the Magic Kingdom park in May 1971, prior to its opening. During its overhaul at the Strasburg Rail Road starting in 2010, this locomotive received a new boiler. Previously assigned exclusively to daily park opening ceremonies due to mechanical issues from 2002 to 2010, it returned to normal passenger train service in late 2016.
No. 3 Roger E. Broggie	Roger E. Broggie	A green steam locomotive with a 4-6-0 wheel arrangement (four leading wheels, six driving wheels, and no trailing wheels) and its tender	4-6-0 (Ten wheeler)	May 1925	Baldwin Locomotive Works	58445	Yellow passenger cars (300 series)	October 1, 1971	Operational	Originally planned to be named after Roy O. Disney, but given that he did not want his name attached to the locomotive nearly identical to the No. 1 named after Walt Disney, the No. 4 was named after him instead. Rededicated in 2003, this was the last WDWRR locomotive to be refurbished at the Tweetsie Railroad. After its overhaul at the Strasburg Rail Road, it received a brand-new tender logo design.
No. 4 Roy O. Disney	Roy O. Disney	A red steam locomotive with a 4-4-0 wheel arrangement (four leading wheels, four driving wheels, and no trailing wheels) and its tender	4-4-0 (American)	February 1916	Baldwin Locomotive Works	42915	Blue passenger cars (400 series)	December 1, 1971	Under overhaul	This locomotive predates the Magic Kingdom's oldest purpose-built amusement attraction: the Prince Charming Regal Carrousel, built in 1918. Its service entry date was delayed until two months after the park opened to make a major repair to its frame. Rededicated in 2002, the locomotive took part in its centennial celebration in 2016.

== Daily operation ==
=== Opening ===
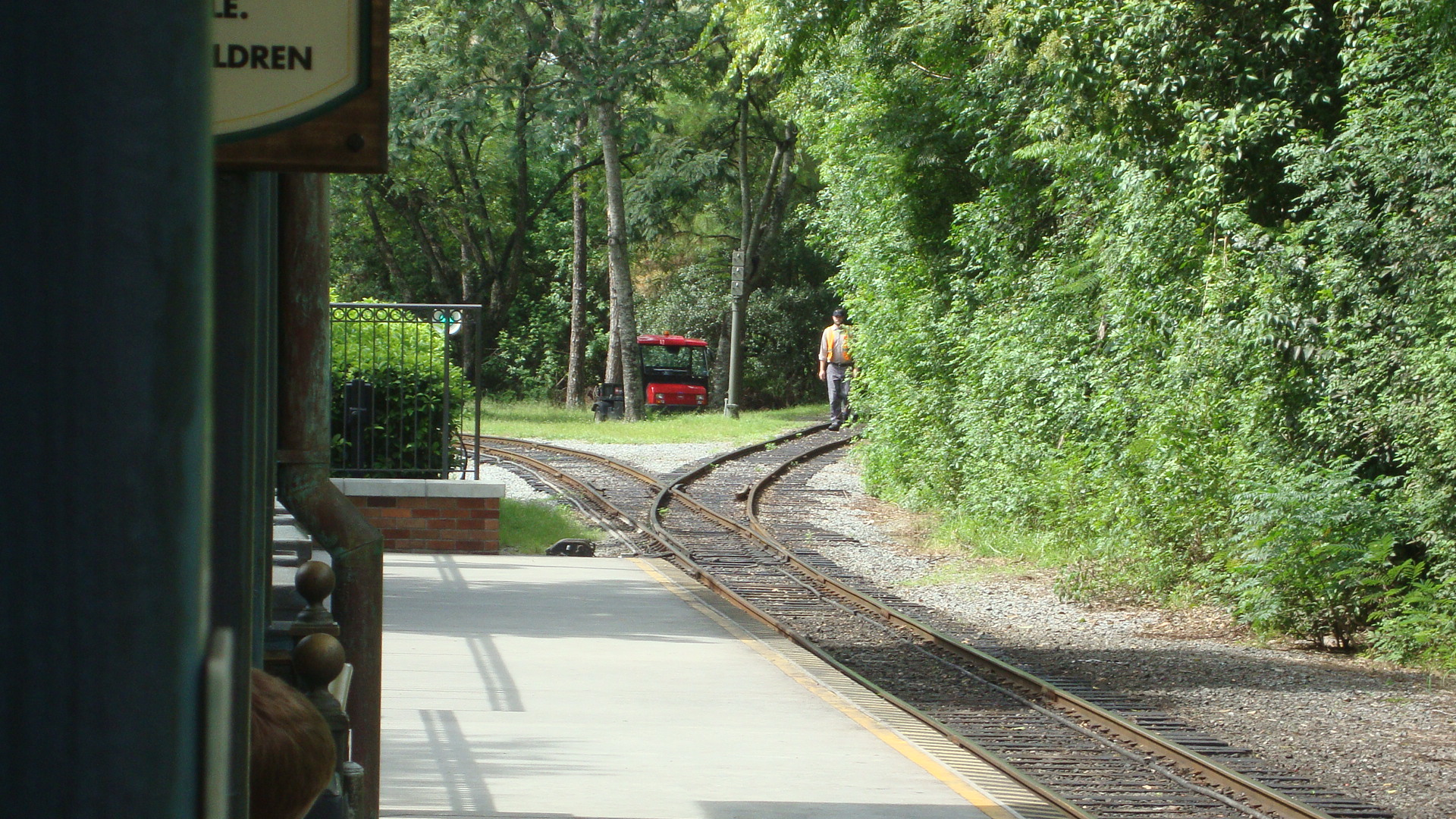
The WDWRR's only mainline switch track at Fantasyland Station

At 5:30 A.M., the first train crew arrives at the WDWRR's roundhouse to get the first train ready to run for the day's operations. The roundhouse stores the WDWRR's locomotives and passenger cars on the lower level, while the upper-level houses the storage and maintenance facility for the Walt Disney World monorails. Each WDWRR train is run by an engineer and fireman in the locomotive, as well as a conductor at the rear of the train who supervises the passengers and ensures that the passenger car's equipment is working. After Main Street Operations employees first work as conductors for more than six months, they have the opportunity to become engineers or firemen. Rookie engineers and engineers in training are nicknamed piglets and pigs, respectively; after training for six months, they are renamed hogs.

Since the locomotive needs steam pressure to operate, an air compressor hose from the roundhouse needs to be connected to the locomotive's air reservoir tank to run the atomizer and stack blower valves for the fireman firing up the locomotive every 45 minutes. Once the locomotive is fired up, the train leaves the roundhouse and stops in front of a railroad crossing while the train crew performs the safety valve test on the locomotive at around 140 psi (0.97 MPa). Afterwards, the train moves to a small bridge where the train crew performs a boiler blowdown on the locomotive. The fireman then throws a switch to let the train enter the WDWRR's mainline starting at Fantasyland Station to perform the last safety check where it runs past a red light to test the passenger car's automatic brakes. Prior to early 2017, the first train going out was the 200 series train set used for the daily park opening ceremonies; it returned to the roundhouse after the performance.

=== In service ===
When the Magic Kingdom park and the WDWRR open at 9:00 A.M., the first two trains arrive at each station with the fireman ringing the locomotive's bell to let the platform conductors know that the trains are ready for passengers to board. Sometimes a third train will be put into operation later in the day when the park's crowd increases. Running all four trains at once is unnecessary due to the short length of the track. Each time a train completes two trips around the park, it will stop at Main Street, USA Station for a crew rotation where the engineer takes a break, the fireman becomes the new engineer, and a new fireman takes over. Meanwhile, the train conductor at each train swapped positions with the station conductor at each station every 20 minutes. It usually takes about two and a half minutes to get some of the passengers off and more passengers on the train at each station. The conductor activates a buzzer horn in the locomotive's cab to let the engineer know if the train is ready to depart or if an emergency stop is needed. Occasionally, before the train departs at each station, the conductor will let more than one child become a Guest Conductor, where they say "All aboard!" through the conductor's microphone and are given a free Guest Conductor souvenir card. During the Magic Kingdom parade events, the trains are halted due to the parade route crossing over the WDWRR tracks in the Frontierland section.

=== Block signals ===
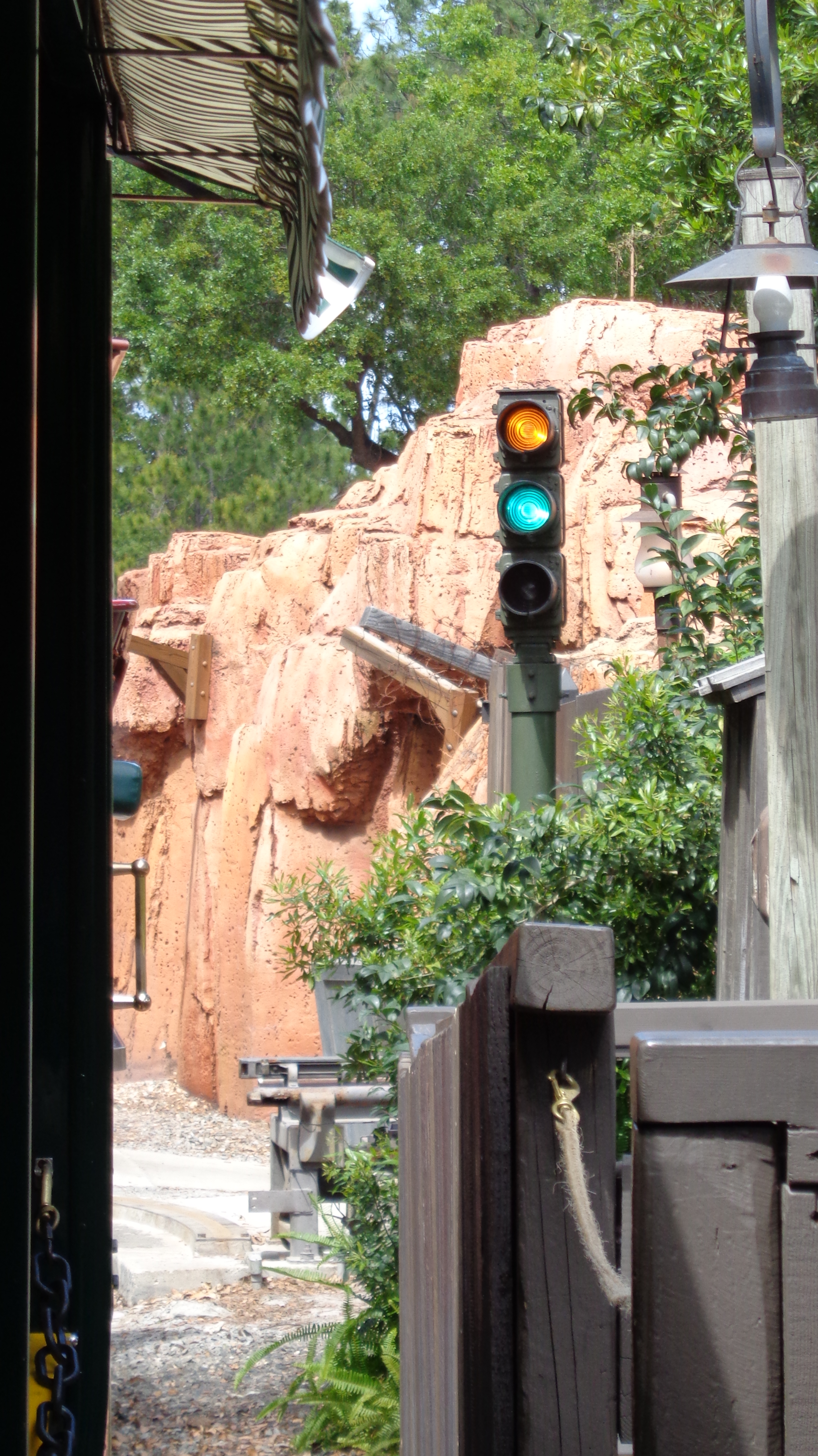
The WDWRR's block signal at Frontierland Station. Behind it is a Big Thunder Mountain Railroad track section, which connects to a swing bridge that leads to the attraction's ride vehicle maintenance facility.

The WDWRR uses block signals to notify the engineers, firemen, and conductors on each train whether the track segments along the railroad's 1.5 miles (2.4 km) of main-line track are clear or occupied by other trains. They are also used to notify WDWRR personnel when Big Thunder Mountain Railroad's transfer track is swung over the WDWRR's track to transfer trains on and off the roller coaster. The WDWRR's track is divided into seven such segments, or blocks, and each block has a track-side block signal to communicate its status. Block signals are located at each of the three stations, alongside the three main-line blocks between the stations, and alongside the spur line connecting the WDWRR's roundhouse to the main line.

Walt Disney World Railroad block signal light details
Block signal light color(s)	Meaning	Action needed (when two trains are operating)	Action needed (when three trains are operating)
Red	Next block is occupied	Stop	Stop
Red + yellow	Next two blocks are occupied	Stop	Stop
Yellow + green	Next block is clear, but following block is occupied	Stop	Proceed to next block
Green	Next two blocks are clear	Proceed to next block	Proceed to next block

=== Closing ===
The WDWRR closes each evening before the fireworks show starts, due to its route in the back of the park running within 100 yards (91 m) of the fireworks staging area. The trains make their last stop at Fantasyland Station, where the conductor throws the switch that lets the trains run in reverse along the spur line leading back to the WDWRR's roundhouse. Once the trains are back completely inside the roundhouse, the train crew shuts them down for the machine shop crew, which gives the locomotives and passenger cars a thorough inspection and performs maintenance or repairs if needed. After midnight, the locomotives' tenders get replenished with diesel oil. The WDWRR closes temporarily during inclement thunderstorms and hurricanes, especially during the summer months.

== Gallery ==
Walt Disney World Railroad info plaques

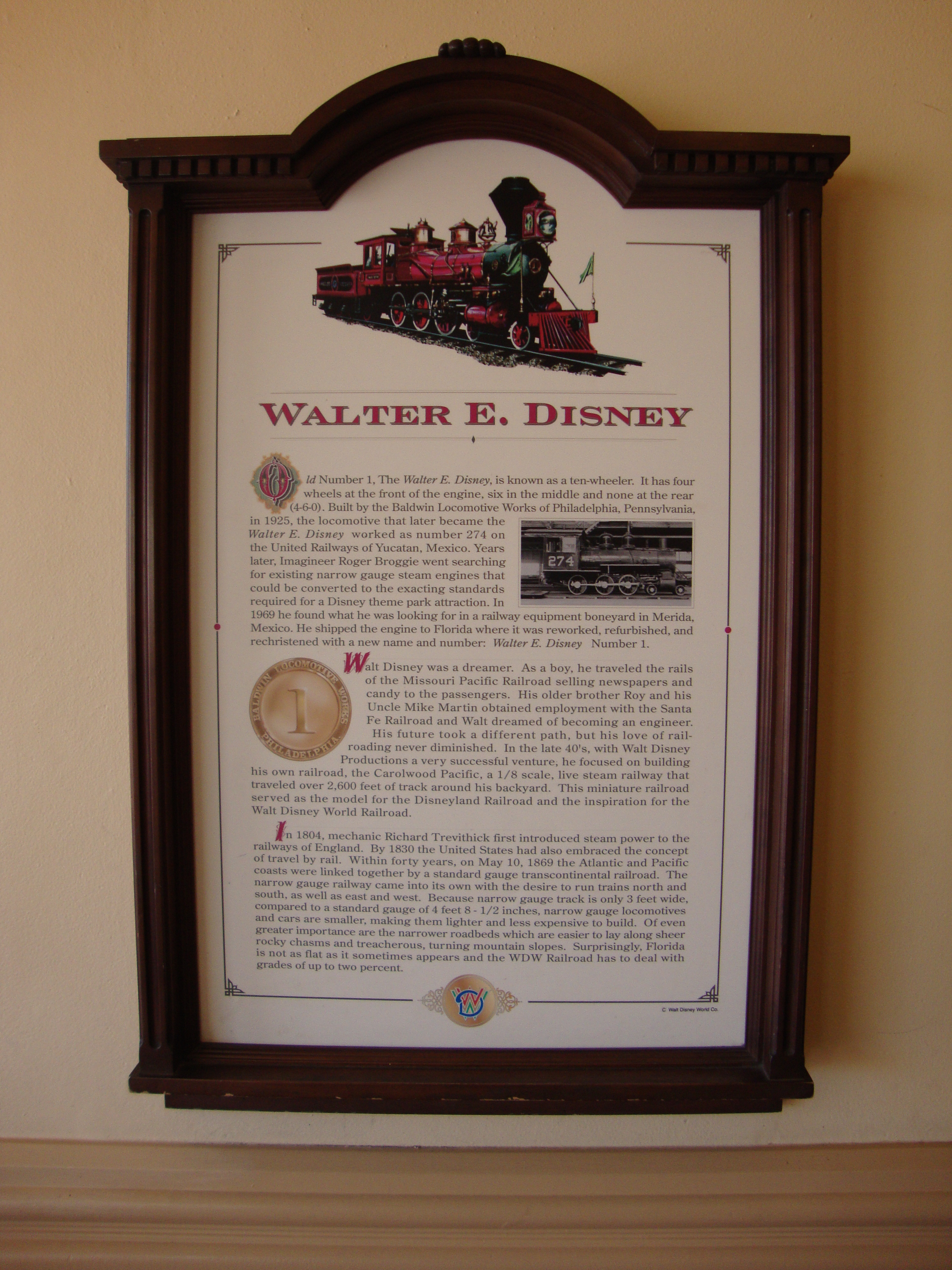
No. 1 locomotive plaque

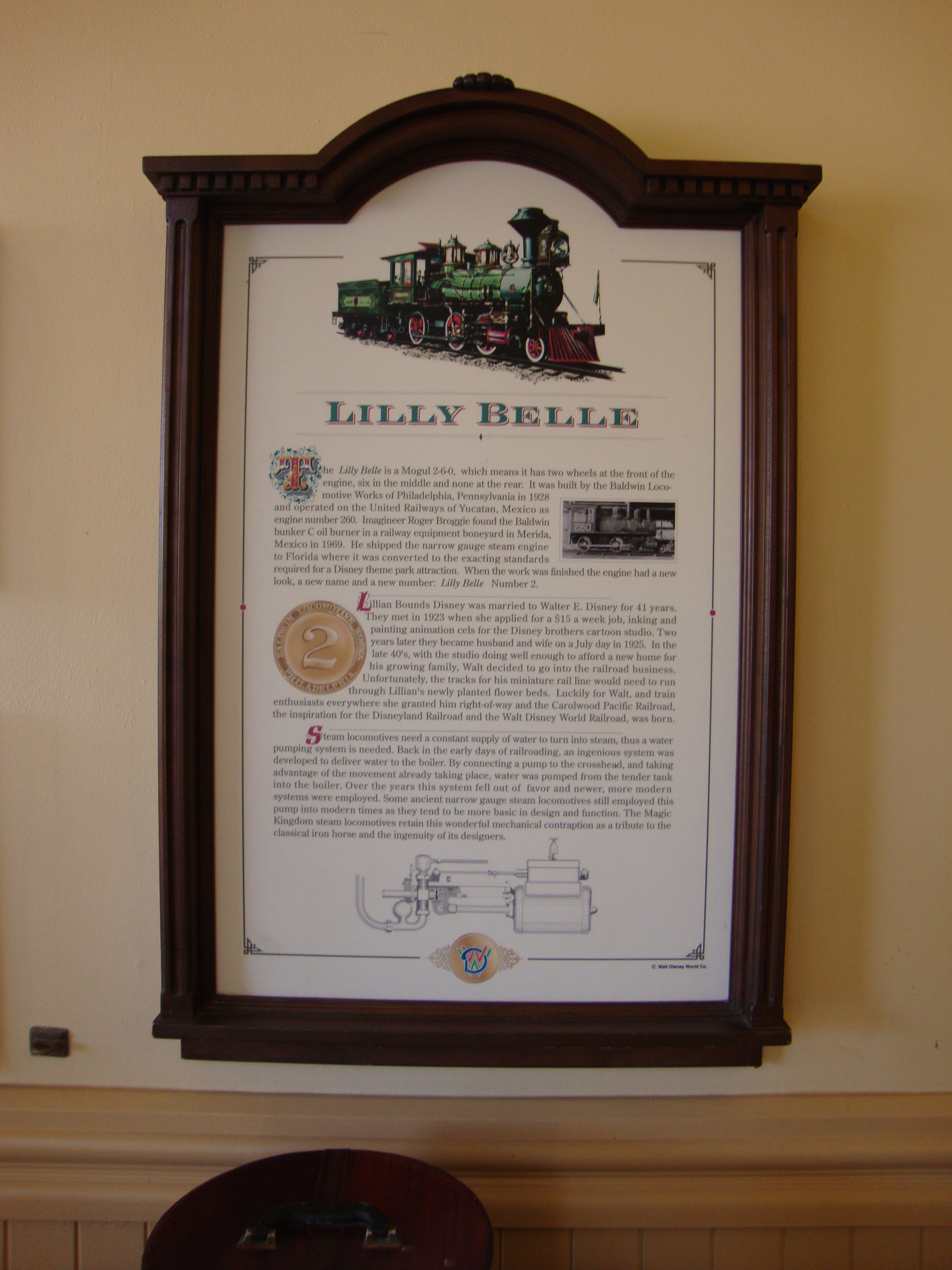
No. 2 locomotive plaque

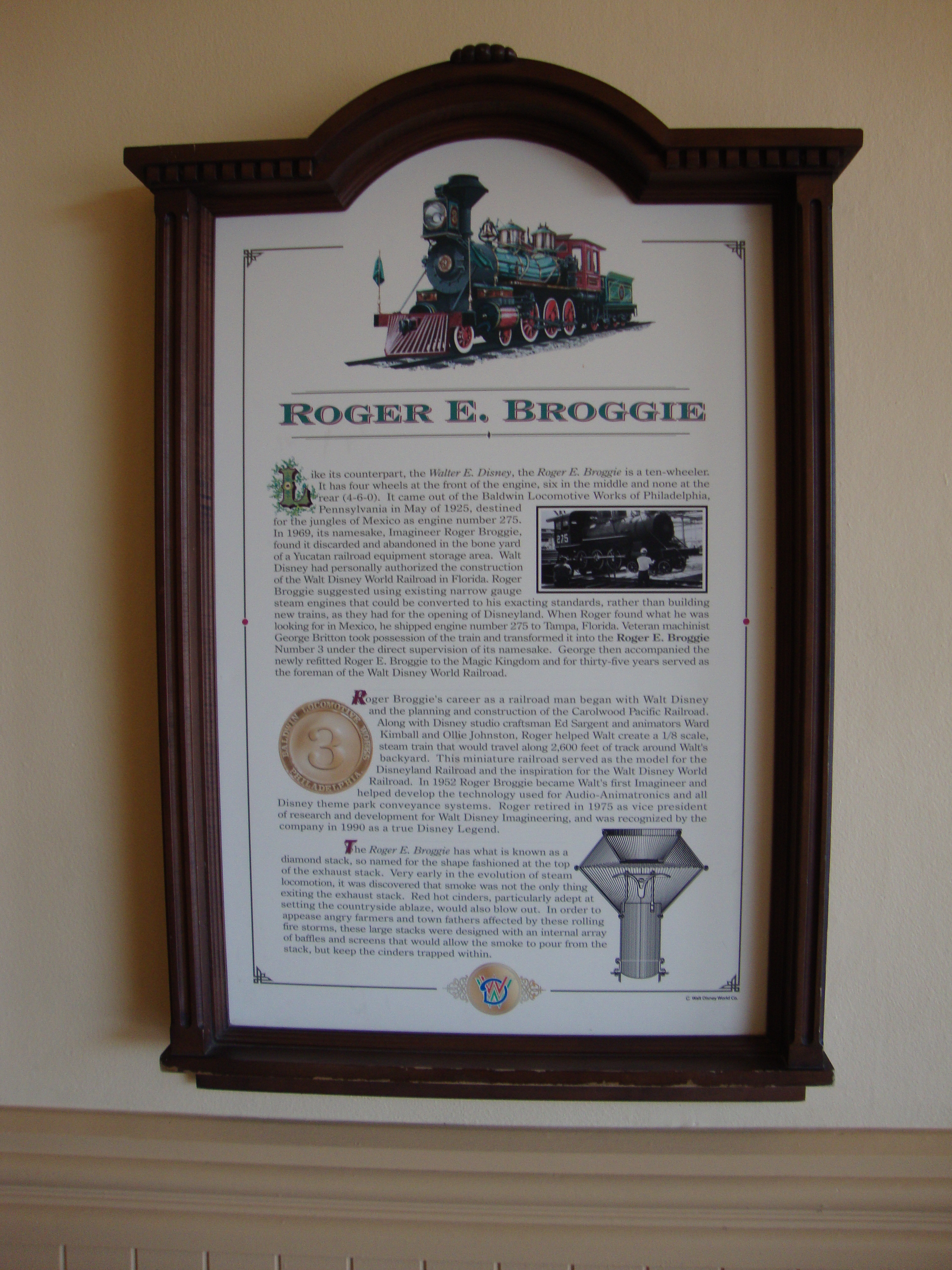
No. 3 locomotive plaque

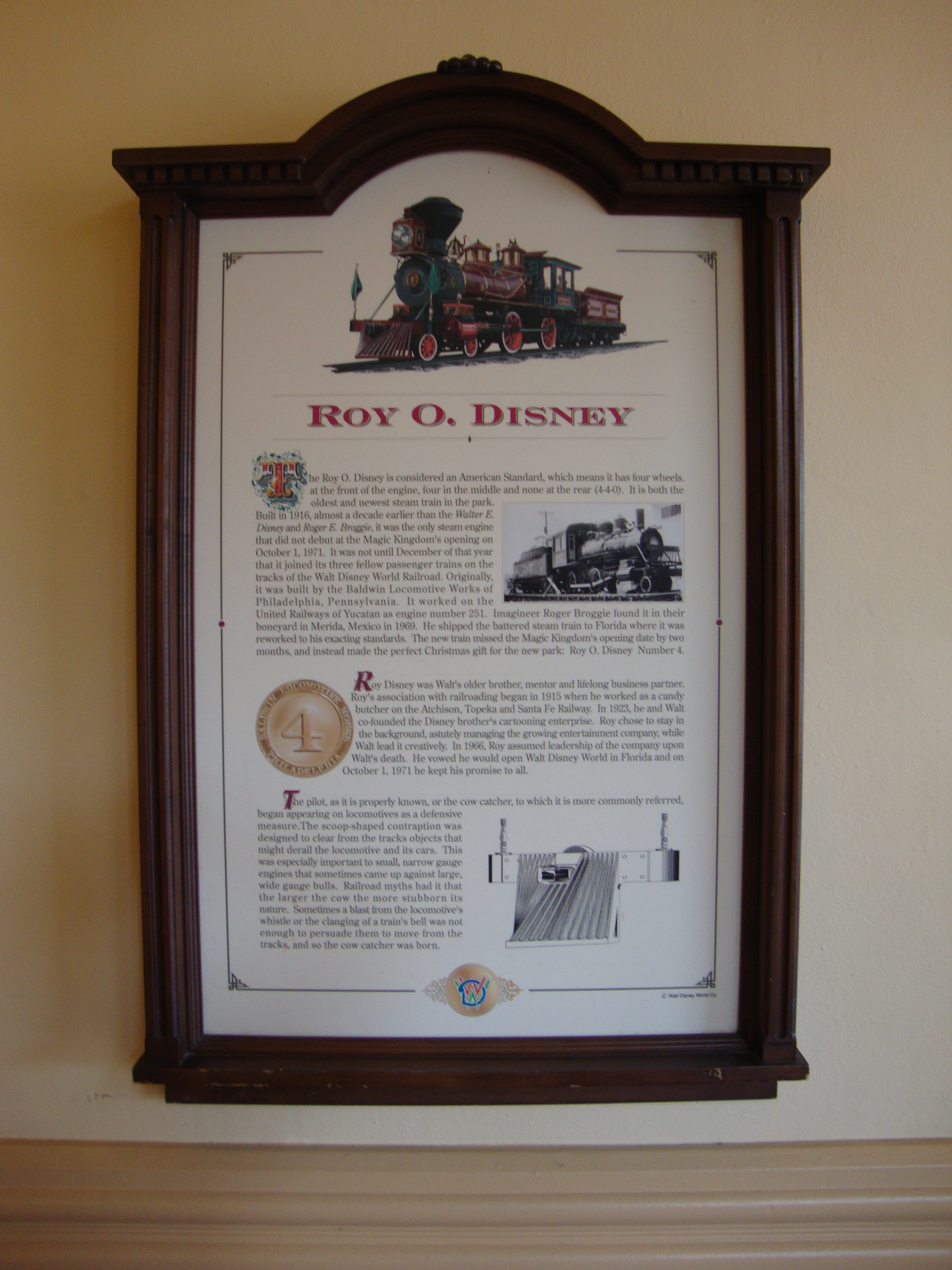
No. 4 locomotive plaque

== See also ==
- Hogwarts Express (Universal Orlando Resort)
- Rail transport in Walt Disney Parks and Resorts
- Serengeti Express
- Sugar Express
- TECO Line Streetcar

== Bibliography ==
- Aero, Rita (2001). Rita Aero's Walt Disney World: The Essential Guide to Amazing Vacations (2nd ed.). St. Martin's Griffin. ISBN 978-0-312-28159-5.
- Amendola, Dana (2015). All Aboard: The Wonderful World of Disney Trains (1st ed.). Disney Editions. ISBN 978-1-4231-1714-8.
- Arrigoni, Pete; Arrigoni, Pat (2008). Whistles, Smoke & Steam (1st ed.). Route 66 Magazine. ISBN 978-0-9701423-8-2.
- Broggie, Michael (2014). Walt Disney's Railroad Story: The Small-Scale Fascination That Led to a Full-Scale Kingdom (4th ed.). The Donning Company Publishers. ISBN 978-1-57864-914-3.
- Crawford, Michael (2015). The Progress City Primer (1st ed.). Progress City Press. ISBN 978-0-9862050-6-4.
- DeGaetano, Steve (2015). The Ward Kimball: The Story of Disneyland Engine No. 5 (2nd ed.). Theme Park Press. ISBN 978-1-941500-58-3.
- Huso, Deborah (2010). Blue Ridge & Smoky Mountains. Moon Handbooks (1st ed.). Avalon Travel Publishing. ISBN 978-1-59880-532-1.
- Leaphart, David (2016). Walt Disney World Railroads Part 3: Yucatan Jewels (1st ed.). Steel Wheel on Steel Rail Studio. ISBN 978-1-533-03707-7.
- Lekkon, Wendy; et al. (2022). Birnbaum's Walt Disney World: The Official Vacation Guide 2023 (1st ed.). Disney Editions. ISBN 978-1-368-08353-9.
- Neal, Julie; Neal, David (2016). The Complete Walt Disney World 2017 (10th ed.). Coconut Press. ISBN 978-0-9903716-4-9.
- Sehlinger, Bob; Testa, Len (2014). The Unofficial Guide to Walt Disney World 2015. The Unofficial Guides (1st ed.). Keen Communications. ISBN 978-1-62809-020-8.
- Veness, Susan (2015). The Hidden Magic of Walt Disney World: Over 600 Secrets of the Magic Kingdom, Epcot, Disney's Hollywood Studios, and Disney's Animal Kingdom (2nd ed.). Adams Media. ISBN 978-1-4405-8780-1.
