= McCloskey & Company Shipyard =

Shipyard in Tampa, Florida

McCloskey & Company Shipyard was a ship builder in Tampa, Florida. McCloskey & Company built 38 cargo ships, Type N3 ship for World War II founded in 1942. McCloskey & Company also built type C1-S-D1 concrete ships. Matthew H. McCloskey founded the construction company McCloskey & Company in Philadelphia. McCloskey & Company built the Philadelphia Convention Hall, the Philadelphia Sheraton Hotel, and the Washington D.C. Stadium.
The Tampa shipyard is now Tampa Ship LLC owned by Edison Chouest Offshore.

== Shipyard ==
During World War II, there was a high demand for ships thus, McCloskey & Company opened a shipyard at Hookers Point in Tampa, Florida. Tampa Port Authority leased the land to McCloskey & Company. With steel in short supply due to the war, McCloskey & Company built 24 self-propelled concrete ships under a Maritime Commission war contract starting in July 1943. McCloskey & Company Shipyard had 6,000 employees at its peak, with 13 shipways (construction berths). Most of the concrete ships were used to move carry sugar. The concrete ships were 366 feet long and had a deadweight of 5,000 tons. Four other companies also built concrete ships for the war. Starting in April 1945 McCloskey & Company built 38 steel hull cargo ships Maritime Commission Type N3 ship, these were small coastal cargo ships.

After the war, the shipyard was sold to the City of Tampa in January 1948. The city leased out the shipyard to Tampa Ship Repair & Dry Dock Company. Tampa Fabricators operated out of the Tampa Ship Repair & Dry Dock Company shipyard starting in 1956 till 1960. The shipyard was vacant in the 1960s. In 1972 the yard was sold to American Ship Building Company as Tampa Shipyards. American Ship Building Company built two large drydocks at the site, but went bankrupt in 1995. For two years the site was owned and run by Tampa Shipbuilding Company. In 1997 the site was sold and became the Tampa Bay Shipbuilding & Repair Company. In 2008 the site was sold to Edison Chouest Offshore and renamed the site Tampa Ship.

== Tampa Ship ==
Tampa Ship operates a 62-acre full-service ship repair facility in Tampa Bay in Hillsborough County. Tampa Ship also does vessel conversions and has four large drydocks. Tampa Ship has 7 repair pier berths off McCloskey Blvd at the start of the Sparkman Channel of Hillsborough Bay. Tampa Ship builds Platform supply vessels and Harbor Tugs. Edison Chouest Offshore has owned Tampa Ship since 2008.

- Drydocks:
- 535 ft (163 m)
- 907 ft. (276.4 m)
- 746 ft. (227.4 m)
- 414 ft. (126.2 m)

== World War 2 ships ==
| Hull # | Ship # | Name | Type | Gross tons | Feet | Delivered | Fate |
|---|---|---|---|---|---|---|---|
| 1 | 244546 | Vitruvius | C1-S-D1 | 4,826 | 350 | Dec-43 | Breakwater at Normandy |
| 2 | 244258 | David O. Saylor | C1-S-D1 | 4,826 | 350 | Nov-43 | Breakwater at Normandy |
| 3 | 244542 | Arthur Newell Talbot | C1-S-D1 | 4,826 | 350 | Feb-44 | Breakwater at Kiptopeke VA |
| 4 | 245070 | Richard Lewis Humphrey | C1-S-D1 | 4,826 | 350 | Mar-44 | Sold in Mexico |
| 5 | 245069 | Richard Kidder Meade | C1-S-D1 | 4,826 | 350 | Mar-44 | Breakwater at Kiptopeke VA |
| 6 | 245071 | Willis A. Slater | C1-S-D1 | 4,826 | 350 | Feb-44 | Breakwater at Kiptopeke VA |
| 7 | 245336 | Leonard Chase Watson | C1-S-D1 | 4,690 | 350 | Jun-44 | Breakwater at Kiptopeke VA |
| 8 | 245335 | John Smeaton | C1-S-D1 | 4,826 | 350 | Apr-44 | Breakwater at Powell River BC |
| 9 | 245579 | Joseph Aspdin | C1-S-D1 | 4,690 | 350 | May-44 | Wrecked and lost 1948 |
| 10 | 245773 | John Grant | C1-S-D1 | 4,826 | 350 | Jun-44 | Breakwater at Kiptopeke VA |
| 11 | 245771 | M. H. Le Chatelier | C1-S-D1 | 4,690 | 350 | Jul-44 | Breakwater at Powell River BC |
| 12 | 245774 | L. J. Vicat | C1-S-D1 | 4,690 | 350 | Jul-44 | Breakwater at Powell River BC |
| 13 | 246010 | Robert Whitman Lesley | C1-S-D1 | 4,690 | 350 | Jul-44 | Breakwater at Kiptopeke VA |
| 14 | 246120 | Edwin Thacher | C1-S-D1 | 4,690 | 350 | Jul-44 | Breakwater at Kiptopeke VA |
| 15 | 246257 | C. W. Pasley | C1-S-D1 | 4,690 | 350 | Aug-44 | Breakwater at Newport OR |
| 16 | | Armand Considere | C1-S-D1 | 4,690 | 350 | Sep-44 | Breakwater at Powell River BC |
| 17 | | Francois Hennebique | C1-S-D1 | 4,690 | 350 | Sep-44 | Breakwater at Newport OR |
| 18 | | P. M. Anderson | C1-S-D1 | 4,690 | 350 | Sep-44 | Breakwater at Powell River BC |
| 19 | 246727 | Albert Kahn | C1-S-D1 | 4,680 | 350 | Oct-44 | Abandoned and lost 1947 |
| 20 | 246758 | Willard A. Pollard | C1-S-D1 | 4,680 | 350 | Nov-44 | Breakwater at Kiptopeke VA |
| 21 | 246759 | William Foster Cowham | C1-S-D1 | 4,680 | 350 | Nov-44 | Breakwater at Kiptopeke VA |
| 22 | 246877 | Edwin Clarence Eckel | C1-S-D1 | 4,680 | 350 | Dec-44 | Scuttled 1946 |
| 23 | 246881 | Thaddeus Merriman | C1-S-D1 | 4,680 | 350 | Nov-44 | Breakwater at Powell River BC |
| 24 | 246878 | Emile N. Vidal | C1-S-D1 | 4,680 | 350 | Dec-44 | Breakwater at Powell River BC |
| 25 | 180568 | Northern Warrior | N3-S-A2 | 1,900 | 250 | Apr-45 | To Britain 1945, sold 1947, scrapped 1970 |
| 26 | 180576 | Northern Chieftain | N3-S-A2 | 1,900 | 250 | Apr-45 | To Britain 1945, sold 1947, scrapped 1982 |
| 27 | 180714 | Northern Pioneer | N3-S-A2 | 1,900 | 250 | May-45 | To Britain 1945, to Greece 1945 as Zakynthos, sold 1947, later Teng 1407, Hung Chang, scrapped |
| 28 | 247949 | Northern Wanderer | N3-S-A2 | 1,870 | 250 | Jun-45 | Later Warren Bearne, to the Philippines 1949, scrapped 1963 |
| 29 | 248016 | Northern Explorer | N3-S-A2 | 1,870 | 250 | Jun-45 | Later Nat Brown, to USA 1949, to USN 1951 as Centaurus (AK 264), scrapped 1960 |
| 30 | 248017 | Northern Voyager | N3-S-A2 | 1,870 | 250 | Jun-45 | Later Oliver R. Mumford, scrapped 1964 |
| 31 | 248014 | Northern Adventurer | N3-S-A2 | 1,870 | 250 | Jun-45 | Sold 1946, later Hai Ming, Chung Kai, sank 1964 |
| 32 | 248215 | Northern Squire | N3-S-A2 | 1,870 | 250 | Jun-45 | Scrapped 1964 |
| 33 | 248216 | Northern Yeoman | N3-S-A2 | 1,870 | 250 | Jul-45 | To USA 1949, to USN 1951 as Serpens (AK 266), scrapped 1960 |
| 34 | 248211 | Northern Archer | N3-S-A2 | 1,870 | 250 | Jul-45 | Sold 1947, scrapped 1979 |
| 35 | 248204 | Northern Stalker | N3-S-A2 | 1,870 | 250 | Jul-45 | Sold 1947, scrapped 1974 |
| 36 | 248394 | Eben H. Linnell | N3-S-A2 | 1,870 | 250 | Jul-45 | To USA 1949, scrapped |
| 37 | 248399 | Northern Trapper | N3-S-A2 | 1,870 | 250 | Aug-45 | Scrapped 1964 |
| 38 | 248397 | John J. Jackson | N3-S-A2 | 1,870 | 250 | Aug-45 | Sold 1947 as Samsun, later Hopa, Merve, scrapped in Turkey 1978 |
| 39 | 248396 | Frederick Lendholm | N3-S-A2 | 1,870 | 250 | Sep-45 | Sold 1947, later Don Martin, scrapped in Peru 1967 |

Two C1-S-D1 concrete ships SS Vitruvius and SS David O. Saylor were taken out of maritime service and used to make a breakwater at Normandy for the Normandy landings. The breakwater was part of the Mulberry harbour, a temporary manmade harbor for World War II, used for the rapid offloading of cargo onto beaches during the Allied invasion of Normandy in June 1944. The Breakwater were called Corncobs and Gooseberries. The sunk Vitruvius and David O. Saylor were used at Utah Beach. Nine ships were used at The Kiptopeke Breakwater in Chesapeake Bay, Virginia at 37.164267°N 75.991402°W.

Ten of the concrete ships are at the Powell River, British Columbia at 49.865238°N 124.555821°W, where a lumber mill then as a breakwater. known as The Hulks.

== Gallery ==
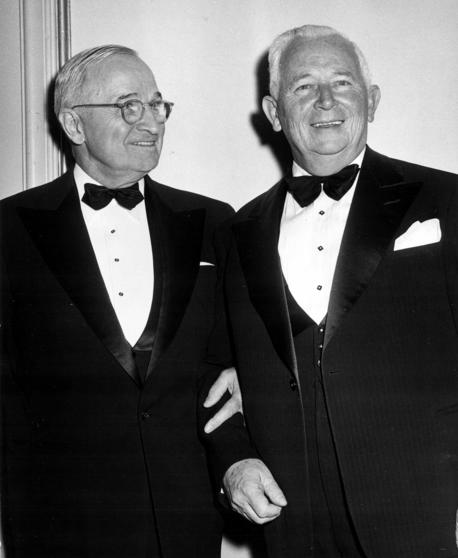
Matthew McCloskey (at right) with President Harry Truman

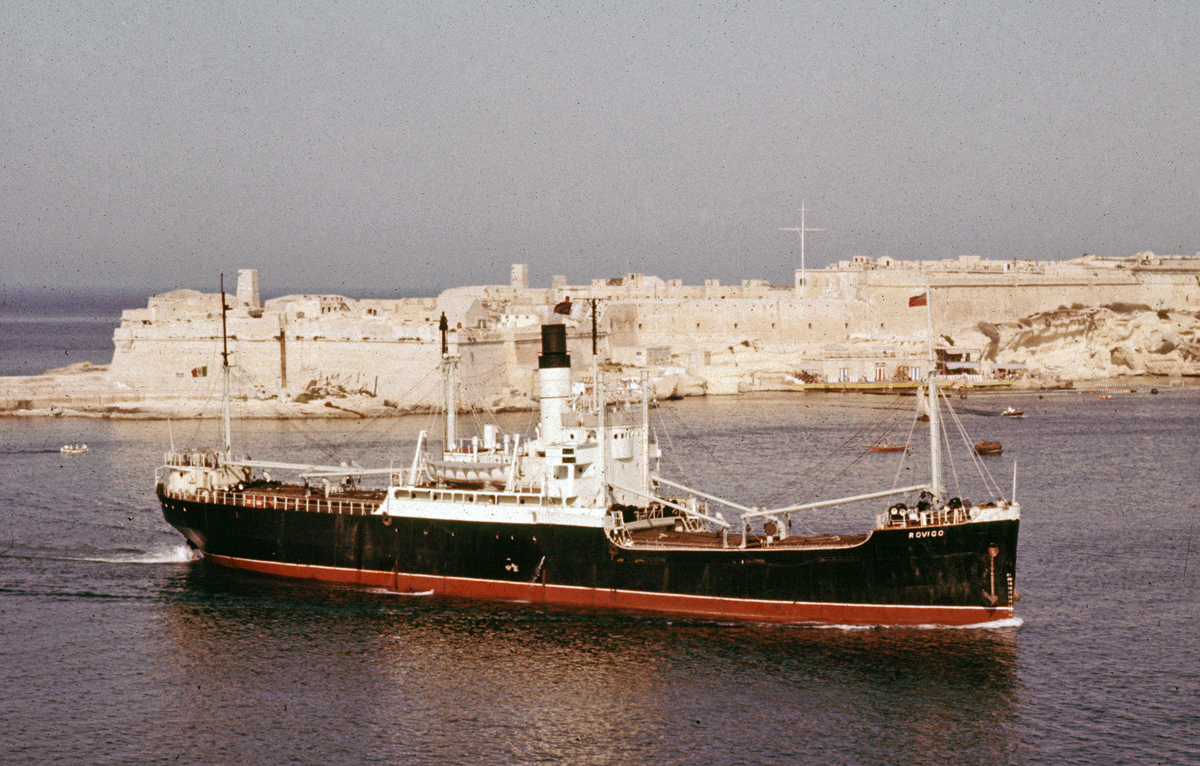
A Type N3-S-A2 ship built in World War II

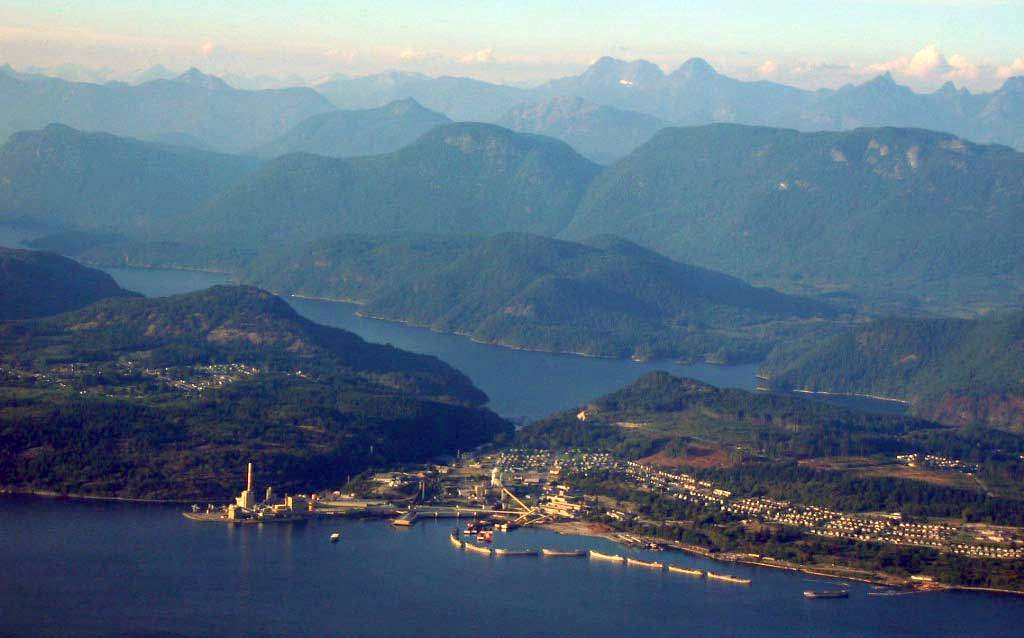
A 2004 view of the city of Powell River with its breakwater ships visible.

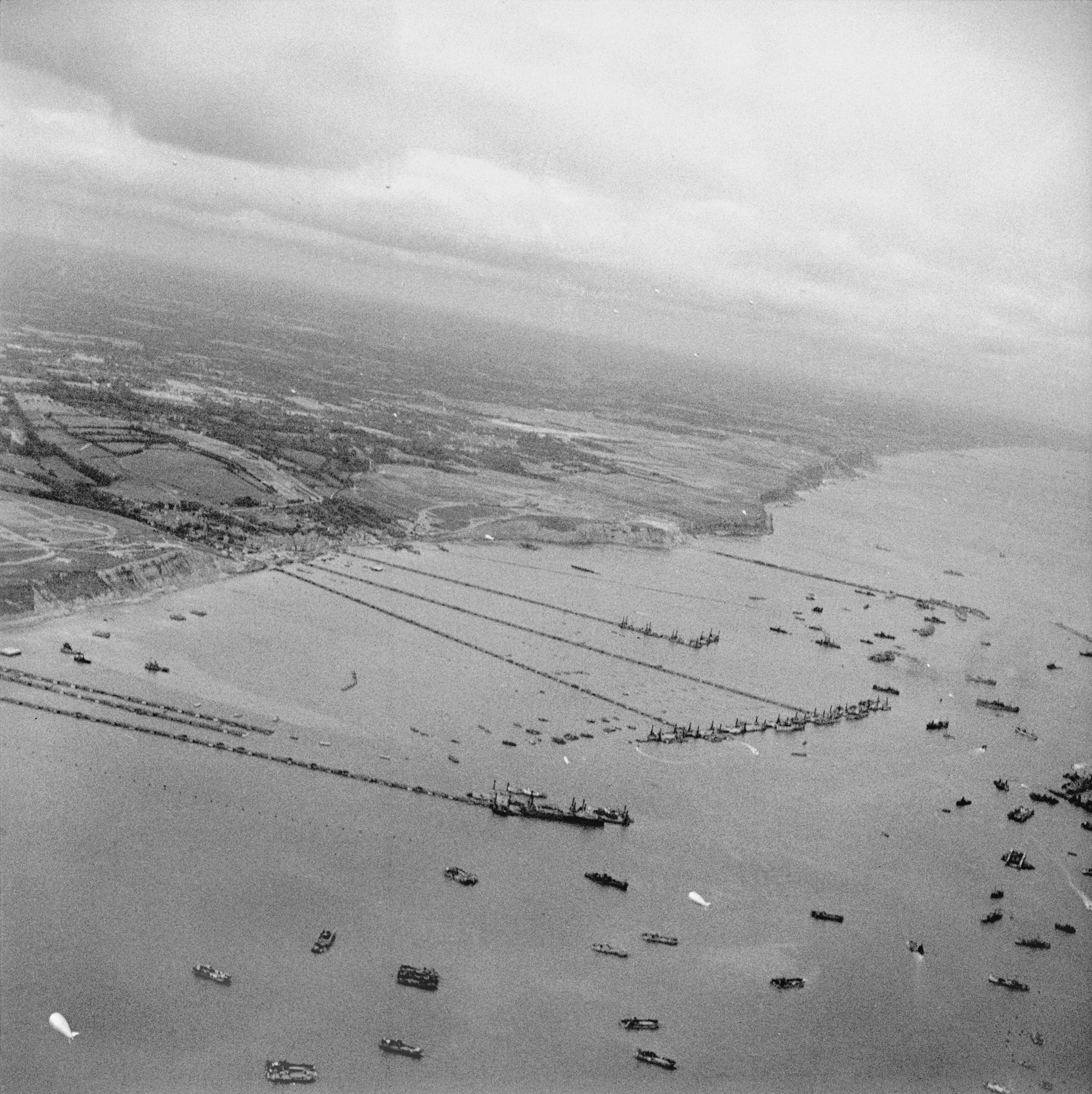
Mulberry artificial harbour in Normandy, September 1944

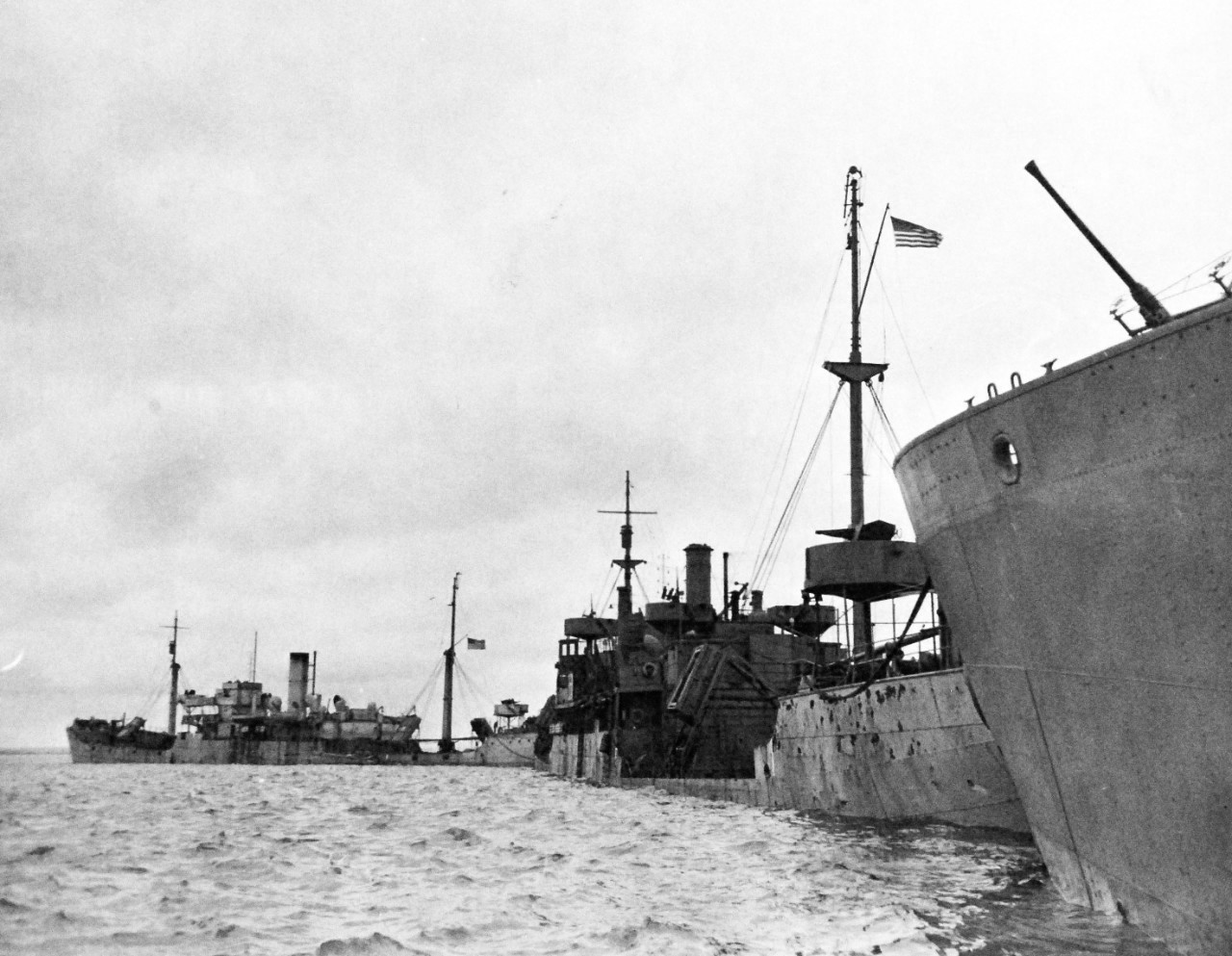
Gooseberry sunk ships in June 1944

== See also ==
- 20,000 Leagues Under the Sea: Submarine Voyage
- Admiral Joe Fowler Riverboat
- Walt Disney World Railroad
- USS Volans
- Tampa Shipbuilding Company
