= SS Kielce =

Polish-operated cargo ship sunken in England

Coordinates: 51°02′20″N 01°13′33″E

History
- Name: Edgar Wakeman (1943–44); Kielce (1944–present)
- Namesake: City of Kielce, Poland
- Owner: War Shipping Administration (1943–1944), Żegluga Polska (1944–onwards)
- Builder: Pennsylvania Shipyards, Inc, Beaumont, Texas
- Launched: September 1943
- Completed: 1943
- In service: 11 March 1944
- Out of service: 5/6 March 1946
- Fate: Sunk after collision with the steamer Lombardy

General characteristics
- Class & type: Type N3-S-A2
- Tonnage: 1,752 GRT; 990 NRT; 2,905 DWT
- Length: 250 ft (76 m)
- Beam: 41.3 ft (12.6 m)
- Draft: 20 ft 9 in (6.32 m)
- Depth: 20.4 ft (6.2 m)
- Decks: 1
- Installed power: 1,300 SHP
- Propulsion: 6-cylinder steam engine
- Speed: 10.2 knots (18.9 km/h)
- Range: 4,500 nautical miles (8,300 km)
- Crew: 26 (in Polish service)
- Sensors & processing systems: direction finding equipment; echo sounding equipment

SS Kielce was a Polish-operated cargo ship. She was a Type N3-S-A2 steamship, built in the United States in 1943 as SS Edgar Wakeman.

In 1946, while laden with a cargo of munitions, she sank in the English Channel after colliding with the British or French steamer Lombardy.

In 1967, an attempt to salvage her wreck inadvertently detonated some of her cargo; the resulting explosion was measured to be equivalent in force to a minor earthquake.

== History ==
Pennsylvania Shipyards, Inc built Edgar Wakeman at Beaumont, Texas, and completed her in 1943. She was an oil-burning steamship, a variant of the Type N3 design built at the request of the UK Government.

In 1944, the US War Shipping Administration bareboat chartered her to the Polish government-in-exile, who renamed her after the city of Kielce in Małopolska. In April 1944, Kielce sailed in Convoy HK 217 from Galveston to Key West, Convoy KN 308 from Key West to New York, and Convoy HX 289 from New York to Liverpool. From then until April 1945, she took part in short-distance convoys in UK home waters.

On 5 March 1946, Kielce was in the English Channel off Folkestone, carrying a cargo of munitions from Southampton to Bremerhaven, when she collided with the steamer Lombardy. Kielce sank about four miles offshore, in water about 90 feet (27 m) deep. All crew members were rescued by Lombardy with no casualties.

== Explosion ==
In 1966, the Folkestone Salvage Company was contracted to clear the wreck, and disperse her explosive cargo. In 1967, the salvage company tried to dismantle part of the hull by setting explosive cutting charges. On 22 July 1967, the third of these charges detonated some of her cargo. The resulting explosion damaged ceilings and chimneys, and dislodged roof slates in Folkestone. A few windows were broken when their frames shifted due to the blast. Despite the immense amount of force that was generated by the explosion, nobody was injured.

There are claims that the explosion “brought panic to Folkestone’s town, and chaos to the beaches,” a few sources reported that it caused a “tidal wave,” and there were a small number of successful property claims from water damage along the beachfront. Two employees of the salvage company that were in a small boat located only about 400 yards (370 m) from the wreck witnessed only “a small ripple and some spray,” and it has been calculated that the resulting sea wave could not have been more than 2 feet (0.6 m) high.

The explosion was recorded by 25 seismic recording stations, some of them up to 5,000 miles (8,000 km) away. From their recordings, the explosion was estimated to have been about 4.5 on the Richter scale. It left a crater on the seabed 153 feet (47 m) long, 67 feet (20 m) wide, and 20 feet (6 m) deep.

== See also ==
- SS Castilian — WWII shipwreck in the Irish Sea containing explosives.
- SS Richard Montgomery — WWII shipwreck in the Thames Estuary containing explosives.
- List of accidents and incidents involving transport or storage of ammunition
