= Type N3 ship =

World War II coastal cargo ship design

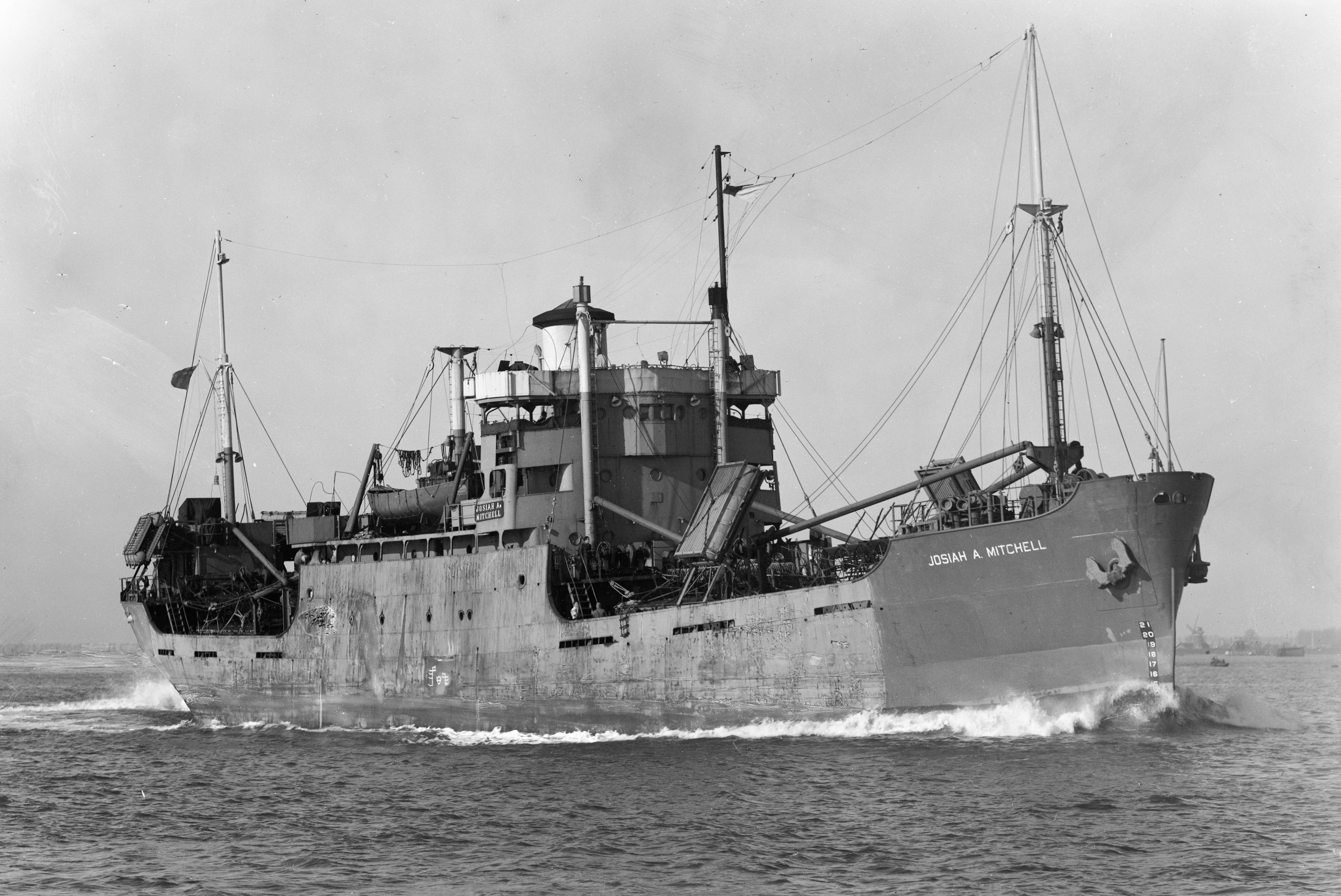
- N3-S-A2 type cargo ship Josiah A. Mitchell

Class overview
- Name: Type N3
- Subclasses: N3-S-A1 (coal fired), N3-S-A2 (oil fired), N3-M-A1 (diesel with superstructure aft)
- Completed: 109

General characteristics
- Class & type: Cargo ship
- Tonnage: 2,905 dwt
- Length: 258 ft 9 in (78.87 m)
- Beam: 42 ft 1 in (12.83 m)
- Draft: 20 ft 9 in (6.32 m)
- Installed power: reciprocating steam
- Propulsion: Coal or oil fired, 1300 shaft horsepower
- Speed: 10.2 knots (11.7 mph; 18.9 km/h)
- Capacity: 2,905 t (2,859 long tons) deadweight (DWT)

Type N3-S ships were a Maritime Commission small coastal cargo ship design to meet urgent World War II shipping needs, with the first of the 109 N3, both steam and diesel, type hulls delivered in December 1942. (Note: While essentially built for the same purpose they were not the sectional pre-fabricated and assembly-line produced (Chrysler) "Liberty Ships" as they are sometimes, if improperly, confused with.)

A total of 109 N3 ship were built by:

- Penn-Jersey Shipbuilding Corp. of Camden, New Jersey.
- Walter Butler Shipbuilders Inc. of Superior, Wisconsin
- Pacific Bridge Company of Alameda, California
- Avondale Shipyard of New Orleans, Louisiana
- Pennsylvania Shipyards, Inc. of Beaumont, Texas
- Ingalls Shipbuilding of Pascagoula, Mississippi
- Pendleton Shipyard Company of New Orleans, Louisiana
- McCloskey shipyard, Tampa, Florida

== Design ==
The N3-S, with "S" designating "steam," came in two versions patterned on and sometimes themselves termed Baltic Coasters. One, the N3-S-A1 was coal fired reciprocating steam powered at British request with the N3-S-A2 variant being oil fired and both types intended largely for wartime lend lease.

The basic design characteristics were:

- Deadweight tonnage—2,905.
- Length overall—258 feet 9 inches.
- Breadth—42 feet 1 inch.
- Cargo capacity tons—2,243.
- Crew—23.
- Normal sea speed (average sea conditions)—10½ knots.
- Cruising radius (nautical miles)—4,500.
- Machinery—reciprocating steam.

However, as the built dimensions and tonnage of the two N3-S types varied somewhat from the basic design and each other. The fourteen Penn-Jersey N3-M-A1 vessels had a different profile in addition to being diesel powered.

=== N3-S-A1 ===
All of the 36 N3-S-A1 vessels, 2,800 DWT, delivered from December 1942 through May 1945, went to Britain and those surviving the war tended to be sold commercial but one; built as the Freeman Hatch and lastly named Houston, gaining some notoriety being sunk during the failed Bay of Pigs invasion in 1961. Nine built by Leathem D. Smith Ship Building & Coal Company in Sturgeon Bay, Wisconsin. Nine built by Pacific Bridge Company of San Francisco, California. Walter Butler Shipbuilders Inc. of Superior, Wisconsin built 18.

=== N3-S-A2 ===
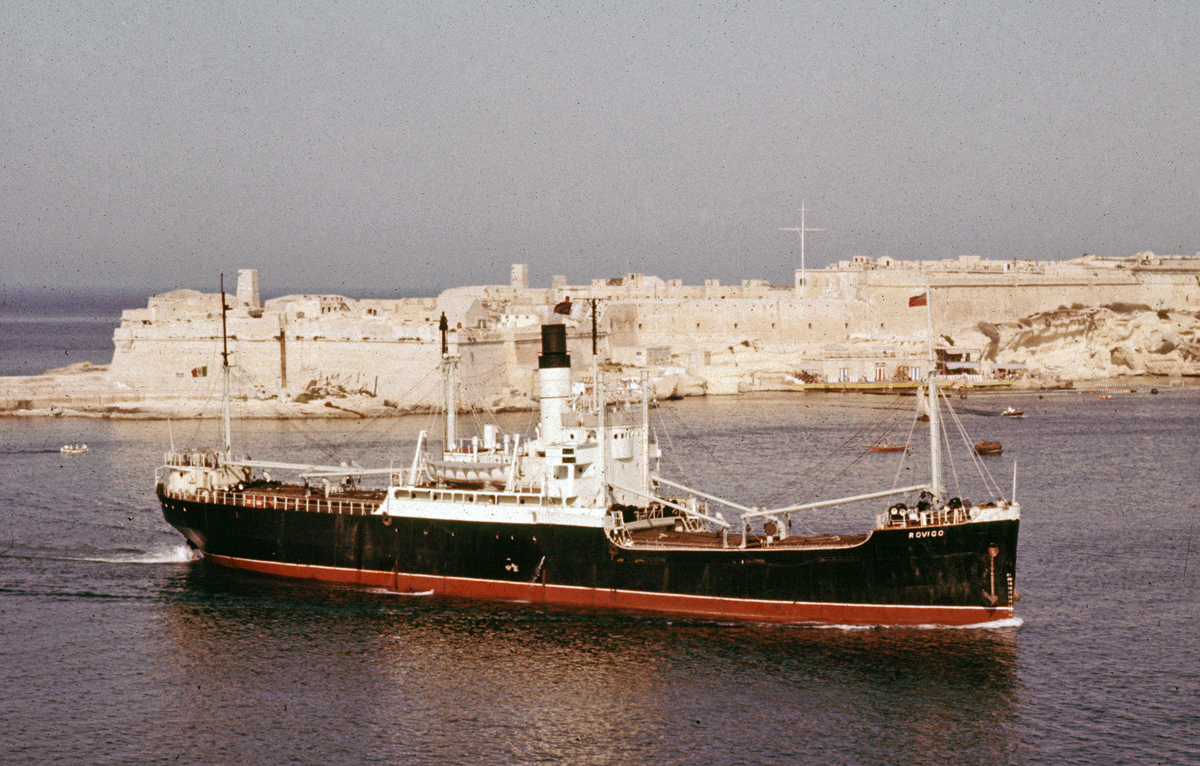
The Rovigo in Malta, which was originally the N3-S-A2 ship George W. Brown

Of the 76 proposed N3-S-A2, 2,757 DWT, vessels 59 were built with the first delivered March 1944 and the last after the war in November 1945 with 17 scheduled ships canceled. All were operated by commercial firms with some going to Poland, Greece and Britain. Twenty-three were allocated by the War Shipping Administration to the Army for use as transports. Of those, 19 were operated in the Southwest Pacific Area as part of the Army's permanent local fleet with the first arriving 5 September 1944 and the last in December 1945. A few found their way into non-commissioned U.S. Naval service by way of Army as postwar auxiliaries with at least some leased to Korea: Alchiba (AK-261), Algorab (AK-262), Aquarius (AK-263), Centaurus (AK-264), Cepheus (AK-265) and Serpens (AK-266). Avondale Marine Ways Inc. of Westwego, Louisiana built 14. Ingalls Shipbuilding Corporation of Decatur, Alabama built 9. McCloskey & Company Shipyard of Tampa, Florida built 15. Pendleton ShipYard Company of New Orleans, Louisiana built 4. Pennsylvania ShipYard Inc. of Beaumont, Texas built 9. Walter Butler ShipYeard Inc. of Duluth, Minnesota built 2. Walter Butler ShipYard Inc. built 6.

=== N3-M-A1 ===
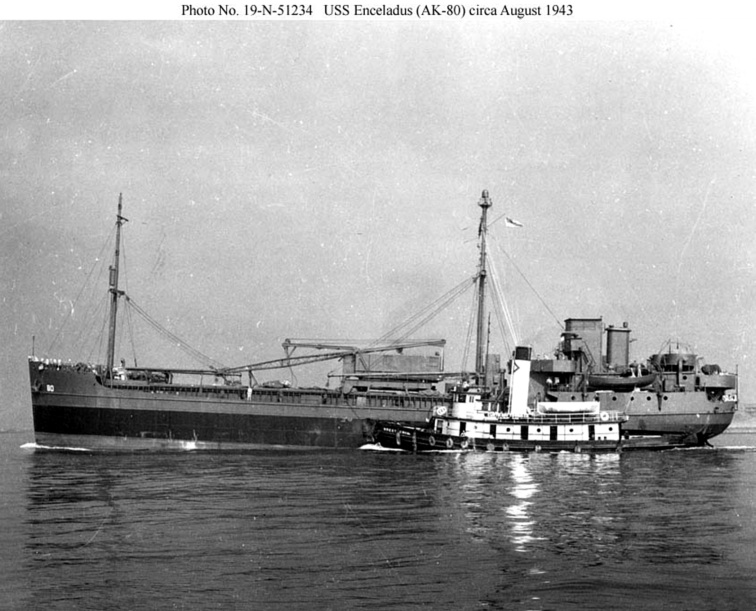
N3-M-A1 as USS Enceladus (AK-80), August 1943 in original Navy configuration. Note Whirley crane, a part of the original N3-M-A1 design.

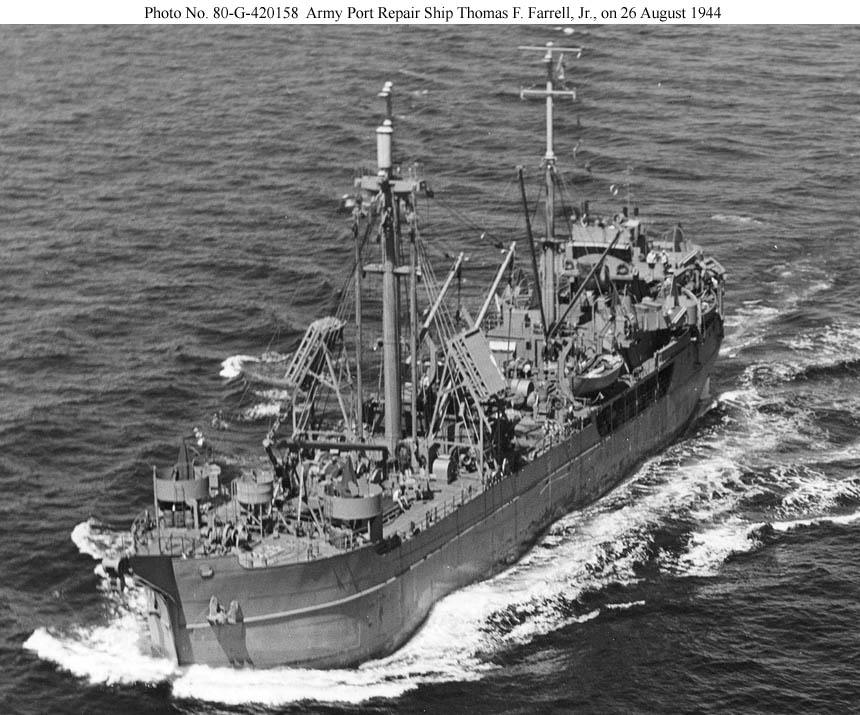
USAPRS Thomas F. Farrel, Jr. underway off the East Coast of the United States, 26 August 1944

A third variant, the N3-M-A1, at 2,900 DWT, was a very limited design with diesel-powered ships with superstructure aft instead of amidships. Fourteen built at Penn-Jersey Shipbuilding Co. of Camden, New Jersey. Barnes-Duluth shipyard built 12. The N3-M-A1 were 2,483 gross tons with a length of 291 feet by beam of 42 feet. Number one and two holds were 56 feet long with number three being 28 feet in length. An example is the Junior N. Van Noy.

The ships were constructed under U.S. Navy supervision as Navy had assumed the Maritime Commission contracts for the Penn-Jersey yard and was allocating vessels of this type for its own and British use. Four of the fourteen ships of this type retained the original form and were transferred to Britain as BAK-1, BAK-2, BAK-3 and BAK-4 and operated by Currie Line for the Ministry of War Transport as Asa Lothrop, Lauchlan McKay, John L. Manson and Nathaniel Mathews. One was retained by the U.S. Navy as the USS Enceladus (AK-80) with the remaining nine transferred to the U.S. Army to be converted to U.S. Army Engineer Port Repair ships. The conversion placed machine, welding and carpenter shops in number two hold along with generators and air compressors supporting engineering work. Number one hold was reserved for construction machinery with number three containing repair stock, portable generators, refrigerated stores and quarters. The ships also carried portable salvage equipment, including diver support, five ton capacity crawler crane, other lifting equipment and a pontoon barge. The most notable feature was addition of a forty-ton cathead derrick for heavy salvage.

- Arthur C. Ely ex Tucana (AK-88) ex MV Symmes Potter
- Glenn Gerald Griswold ex Media (AK-83) ex MV Oliver R. Mumford
- Henry Wright Hurley ex Norma (AK-86) ex MV Sumner Pierce
- Joe C. Specker ex Vela (AK-89) ex MV Charles A. Ranlett
- Madison Jordan Manchester ex USS Hydra (AK-82) ex MV Eben H. Linnell
- Marvin Lyle Thomas ex MV Moses Pike later USNS Sagitta (T-AK-87)
- Richard R. Arnold ex Nashira (AK-85) ex MV Josiah Paul
- Robert M. Emery ex Mira (AK-84) ex MV William Nott
- Thomas F. Farrel Jr. ex Europa (AT-81) ex MV William Lester
- Rio Bravo was torpedoed and sank in 1942

== Incidents ==
- John W. Arey a N3-S-A1, renamed Silver Coast was on a trip from Canabayon Island, Philippines to Luzon, Philippines she sank on 12 Jan. 1971.
- Tully Crosby a N3-S-A1, renamed Capetan Vassilis caught fire and sank on 14 April 1965 at 35.07N 26.52E full of sunflower seed off the eastern coast of the island of Crete.
- Justin Doane a N3-S-A1, sank after gunfire near Chienchow in 1950.
- Gurden Gates a N3-S-A1, On 24 July 1944 the Nazi Dover Strait big guns damaged the Gurden Gates, she was repaired. Later sold and renamed Three Stars, caught fire and was abandoned on 17 Feb 1967 at Episkopi Bay.
- Freeman Hatch a N3-S-A1, renamed Houston, she was bombed by the Cuban Air Force and sank at the Bay of Pigs invasion on 18 April 1961.
- Alden Gifford a N3-S-A1, sank in a gale off the West of England, four miles NNW of Longships on 2 September 1944. Four crewmen died.
- Josiah P. Cressey a N3-S-A1, sunk by gunfire in the Yangtze River in 1949.
- Ashbel Hubbard a N3-S-A1, renamed Solidarity" sank on 4 March 1951. She was traveling with a crew of 24 and a cargo of 2,300 tons of wet mechanical wood pulp in bales from Hommelvik to London. Some hatch covers were washed over board and she fill with water in a storm. The life-saving ship Larvik was able to get the crew.
- Cyrus Sears a N3-S-A1, renamed Giannis. In 1964 she caught fire in the engine room on a trip from Constanța, Romania to Skikda, Algeria with timber. The fire spread to the cargo holds and the superstructure. The crew abandoned ship to the life boats and were taken aboard British MV Sir Andrew Duncan. Sir Andrew Duncan took her under tow to Valletta, Malta. The salvage vessel Thames took her out to sea and she sank at 21 nm NE of Malta at 36.04N-14.42E.
- Reuben Snow (Beechland, Teresa Cosulich) a N3-S-A1. exploded and sank in 1968
- Nathaniel Matthews a N3-M-A1, sank in 1974.
- Edgar Wakeman a N3-S-A2, renamed Kielce, collided with another ship and sank in 1946. She was loaded with munitions. The crew abandoned the ship and were saved. Kielce sank about four miles off Folkestone in the English Channel, in Kent, southeast England. In 1967 the Folkestone Salvage Company was hired to remove the wreck and used explosive charges to dismantle part of the hull. One of these charges detonated her cargo, causing an explosion that was recorded by seismometers up to 5,000 miles (8,000 km) away. It made a crater 153 feet (47 m) long, 67 feet (20 m) wide and 20 feet (6 m) deep and caused minor property damage in Folkestone.
- Otis White a N3-S-A2, renamed Beny, broke in two and sank in 1969 after running a ground off the Brazilian coast.
- David R. Le Craw a N3-S-A2, renamed Los Caribes was in a collision with the MS Schauenburg, then exploded and sank on 20 April 1958 in Mexico, Coatzacoalcos harbor channel. She was going to New York City with a load of sulphur.
- Samuel Samuels a N3-S-A2 renamed Milonga and sank in February 1965. She had an engine fire and started to leak off eastern Sardinia. She was on her way from Sfax for Genoa, in Gulf of Orosei. The crew abandoned ship, but lost three crewmen.
- Northern Adventurer a N3-S-A2, sank in 1964.
- Samuel S. Curwen a N3-S-A2, renamed Northern Master then Hsuan Huai exploded and sank on 3 December 1948.Hsuan Huai was a Chinese troop ship. She had 6,000 men from the province of Mantsjoekwo, in northwest China onboard. She sank near Yingkou in the Yellow Sea.
- John Leckie a N3-S-A2, renamed Pensacola, sank on 5 Feb. 1966. She started leaking in rough sea after dry dock work. She had a full cargo of grain. The crew abandoned ship and she sank 2 1/2 hours later. She sank in the Caribbean Sea off the southeast shore of Hispaniola, while on a voyage from Mobile, Alabama, to Port of Spain, Trinidad.
