= Pendleton Shipyard Company =

US New Orleans shipbuilding company

- Founded: 1941
- Founder: Pendleton E. Leyde
- Defunct: 1958
- Fate: sold to Calmes Engineering
- Successor: Calmes Engineering
- Headquarters: Norfolk, Virginia

Pendleton Shipyard Company was a shipyard in New Orleans, Louisiana started by Pendleton E. Leyde in 1941. Pendleton Shipyard Company built ships for World War II under the Emergency Shipbuilding Program. The shipyard was at the Florida Avenue Wharf at 29.979537°N 90.025385°W. Pendleton Shipyard Company sold the yard to John Wise Calmes, who opened Calmes Engineering at the site. The yard also inspected and delivered small ships built in Mississippi River shipyards to the United States Navy. The Calmes Engineering shipyard closed in April 1958 shortly after the death of Calmes.

== Pendleton Shipyard Company ships ==
=== V4-M-A1 ===
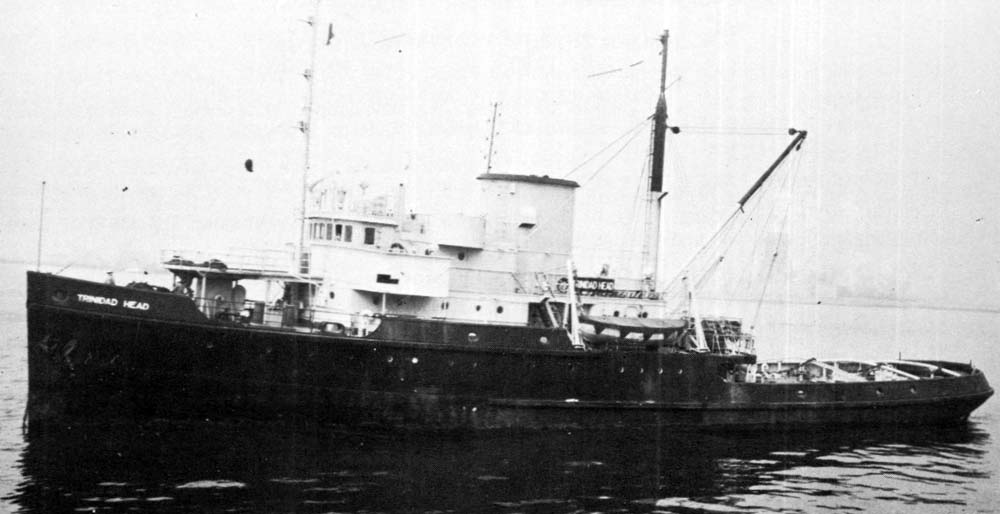
Trinidad Head, a V4-M-A1 tug, in New York July 1943

V4-M-A1 is a Type V ship, that is, a tugboat. The V4-M-A1 tugboats were the largest and most powerful tugs in the world when they were built. They were named after lighthouses. The V4-M-A1 tugboats had steel hulls and displaced 1,613 tons. They were 195 feet long, with a beam of 37.5-foot, a draft of 15.5 feet, and a maximum speed of 14 knots. There were two engine manufacturers: National Supply Company, with 8-cylinder sets of 3,200 bhp and the Enterprise Engine & Trading Company with 6 cylinders and 2,340 bhp power.

=== N3-S-A2 ===
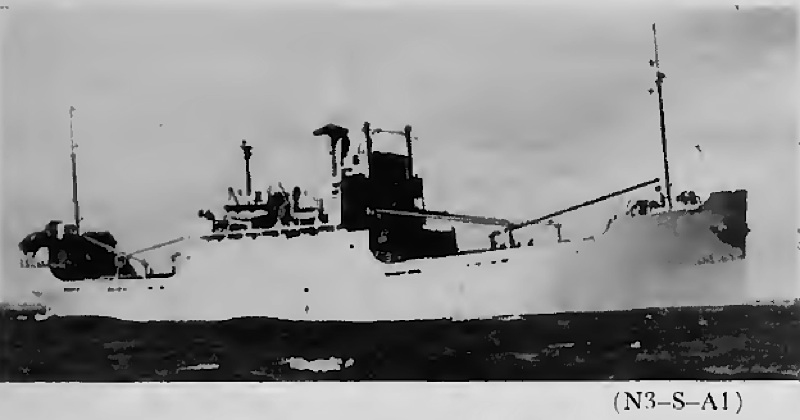
a N3-S-A2 small coastal cargo ship

N3-S-A2 is a Type N3 ship, a small coastal cargo ship. N3-S-A2 ships are 258 ft 9 in (78.87 m) long, have a beam of 42 ft 1 in (12.83 m), a tonnage of 2,905 dwt, a displacement of 14,245 long tons (14,474 t) and a draft of 20 ft 9 in (6.32 m). The ship has 1300 shaft horsepower with a top speed of 10.2 knots (11.7 mph; 18.9 km/h).

These ships were built by the Pendleton Shipyard Company.

*	Name	Ship type	Gross tons	Length (feet)	Built	Notes
*	Matagorda	V4-M-A1	1,117	185	Jun-43	Scrapped 1973
*	Aransas Pass	V4-M-A1	1,117	185	Jun-43	Scrapped 1973
*	Sombrero Key	V4-M-A1	1,117	185	Jun-43	To Argentina 1965 as Thompson, scrapped
*	Dry Tortugas	V4-M-A1	1,117	185	Jul-43	To Argentina 1965 as Goyena, scrapped
*	Southwest Pass	V4-M-A1	1,117	185	Aug-43	Scrapped 1973
*	Montauk Point	V4-M-A1	1,117	185	Sep-43	To Mexico 1969 as R 2, later Quetzalcoatl (A 12)
*	Bayou St. John	V4-M-A1	1,117	185	Nov-43	Scrapped 1977
*	Mobile Point	V4-M-A1	1,117	185	Dec-43	Sank 1944
*	Race Point	V4-M-A1	1,117	185	Feb-44	Scrapped 1972
*	Samuel F. Dewing	N3-S-A2	1,885	250	Apr-44	Sold 1948, scrapped 1963
*	Samuel A. Fabens	N3-S-A2	1,885	250	May-44	Sold 1948, wrecked 1960, salvaged, wrecked 1966
*	Alfred M. Lunt	N3-S-A2	1,885	250	Jul-44	Sold 1946, wrecked 1968
*	Benjamin M. Melcher	N3-S-A2	1,885	250	Aug-44	Sold 1946, scrapped

== Calmes Engineering ships ==
These ships were built by Calmes Engineering.

	Name	Built for	Type	Gross Tons	Length (feet)	Built	Notes
*	Walnut	Corps of Engineers	Towboat	26	50	1947	Sold 1992 as Walnut, later Sara C, now M/V Sara C
*	Chestnut	Corps of Engineers	Towboat	26	50	1948	Sold 1996
*		Florida Power Corp	Tank Barge	642	175	1949	
*	Gator	Florida Power Corp	Tank Barge	642	175	1949	Active
*	CMT 18	Canton Marine Towing	Tank Barge	276	139	1951	Active
*	BC 64** to 64**	US Army	Open Lighter	170	110	1952	10 deck barges
*	BC 6470	US Army	Open Lighter	170	110	1952	To USN as YC 1568, sold 2004
*	Redstone	Corps of Engineers	Towboat	62	64	1952	Sold 1997 as Redstone, then Hunter Eagle, Retriever, now Chris D
*	Barge No. 29	Hannah Marine Corp	Freight Barge	1,387	254	1952	
*	Robert G. West	Corps of Engineers	Towboat	203	84	1953	Sold 1986 as Robert G. West, now Hanging Dog
*	MR-403	Trinity Baton Rouge	Freight Barge	786	200	1954	
*	Sinclair Memphis	Sinclair Refining	Towboat	175	85	1954	Later Fat Lady Pie, now Kalliope
*	Shawnee	Capt. Paul J. Griffin	Towboat	34	47	1954	Now Barbara Sue
*	Bunker Delaware	Bunker Group Virginia	Tank Barge	1,307	227	1955	Active
*	Sallie Estelle	Randolph Construction	Towboat	50	47	1955	Later Nathan J, now Judy Rae
*	Intercity No 1	TT Barge Services	Freight Barge	1,258	270	1955	Active
*		Corps of Engineers	10 Barges			1955-6	
*	Electra	Electric Energy	Towboat	39	48	1956	Active.
*	Captain Archie	Mike Hooks	Towboat	37	49	1957	

== See also ==
- Delta Shipbuilding
- Avondale Shipyard
