= USNS Vela =

Cargo ship of the United States Navy

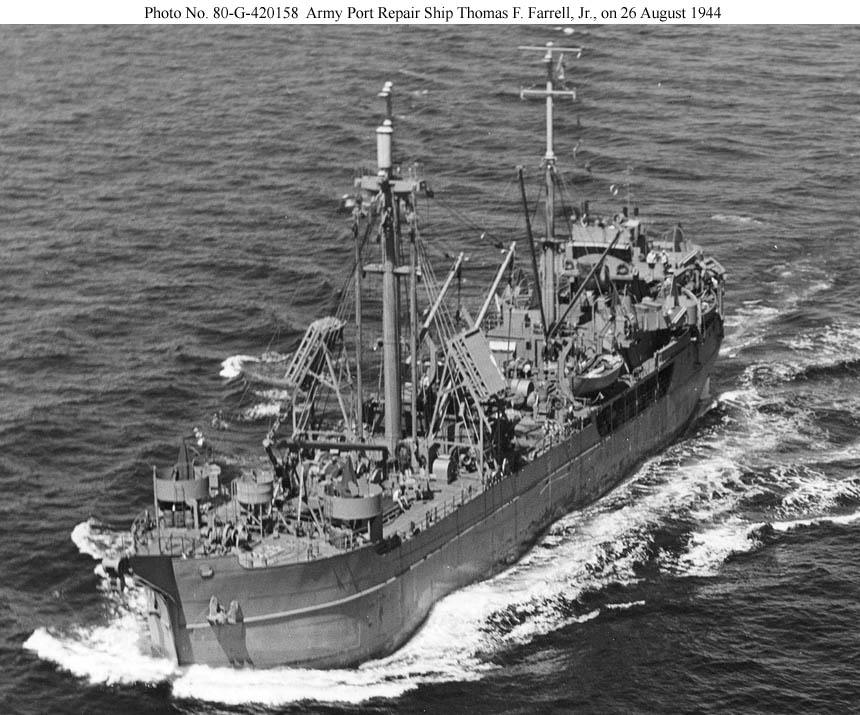
- Sister ship USAPRS Thomas F. Farrel, Jr. underway off the East Coast of the United States, 26 August 1944. US National Archives photo # 80-G-420158 RG-80-G, a US Navy photo now in the collections of the US National Archives.

History

United States
- Ordered: MV Charles A. Ranlett; N3-M-A1 hull, MC hull 652
- Laid down: 5 June 1944
- Launched: 15 January 1945
- Sponsored by: Mrs. Elbert Bradford Ferguson
- Commissioned: Never commissioned, transferred to Army two days after launch
- In service: as USNS Vela (T-AK-89) 12 June 1952
- Out of service: date unknown
- Stricken: 8 February 1945
- Fate: Transferred to the U.S. Army 17 January 1945 renamed Joe C. Specker, transferred U.S. Navy's Military Sea Transportation Service (MSTS) 11 June 1952 as USNS Vela (T-AK-89), sold for scrapping, 23 November 1970

General characteristics
- Displacement: 1,677 t.(lt), 5,202 t.(fl)
- Length: 269 ft 10 in (82.25 m)
- Beam: 42 ft 6 in (12.95 m)
- Draught: 20 ft 9 in (6.32 m)
- Propulsion: Diesel, single shaft, 1,300shp
- Speed: 10 kts.
- Notes: The ship was under Navy supervision during construction, transferred to Army upon delivery to Navy and underwent extensive modifications for operation by the Corps of Engineers as a port repair ship. Subsequent Naval service was as unarmed, civilian crewed USNS Vela (T-AK-89).

Vela (AK-89) (Note: Only USS Enceladus (AK-80) of the ten ships of the Enceladus class, composed of Maritime Commission N3-M-A1 type small cargo vessels, saw significant naval service. Of the other nine, excepting USS Hydra (AK-82), all were transferred within months or days of shipyard delivery to Navy to the Army. Hydra was transferred to Army shortly after commissioning and trials. Navy had assumed the administration of contracts for these ships from the Maritime Commission on 1 January 1943 during or before construction and thus most were only administratively Navy, including names and numbers, during construction.) was never commissioned and thus never bore the USS designation. The ship was transferred to the Army to become the Engineer Port Repair Ship Joe C. Specker shortly after launching. She was one of two such repair ships transferred to Navy in 1952 and served as the civilian crewed, unarmed USNS Vela (T-AK-89).

== Construction ==
The ship was a Maritime Commission type N3-M-A1 cargo vessel hull (MC hull 652) and was assigned the name MV Charles A. Ranlett. Her construction was transferred to Navy supervision on 1 January 1943 and she was subsequently laid down as Vela (AK-89) on 5 June 1944 at Camden, New Jersey, by the Penn-Jersey Shipbuilding Corporation. The ship was launched on 15 January 1945 sponsored by Mrs. Elbert Bradford Ferguson.

== Transfer to Army ==
Two days after launch, on 17 January 1945, the ship was transferred to the U.S. Army for conversion into the Engineer Port Repair Ship Joe C. Specker for operation by the U.S. Army Corps of Engineers rehabilitating war damaged ports. Her name was struck from the Navy list on 8 February 1945. The Army named her for Medal of Honor recipient Joe C. Specker of the 48th Engineer Combat Battalion.

Unlike most port repair ships the Joe C. Specker, among the last two ships (See: Marvin Lyle Thomas) converted and seeing no actual war service as a port repair ship, spent seven postwar years in Army service before transfer Navy.

== Transfer To Navy ==
On 11 June 1952, Vela was transferred to the MSTS and placed in service at Baltimore, Maryland the following day and was reinstated on the Navy list on 22 August. She operated out of New York City through 1958, ranging from Canadian coastal waters to the Caribbean on supply missions.

Later transferred to the Maritime Administration and placed in the National Defense Reserve Fleet, she was berthed in the Hudson River until she was sold on 23 November 1970 to Hierros Ardes, S.A., Spain, and scrapped.
