= USNS Sagitta =

Cargo ship of the United States Navy

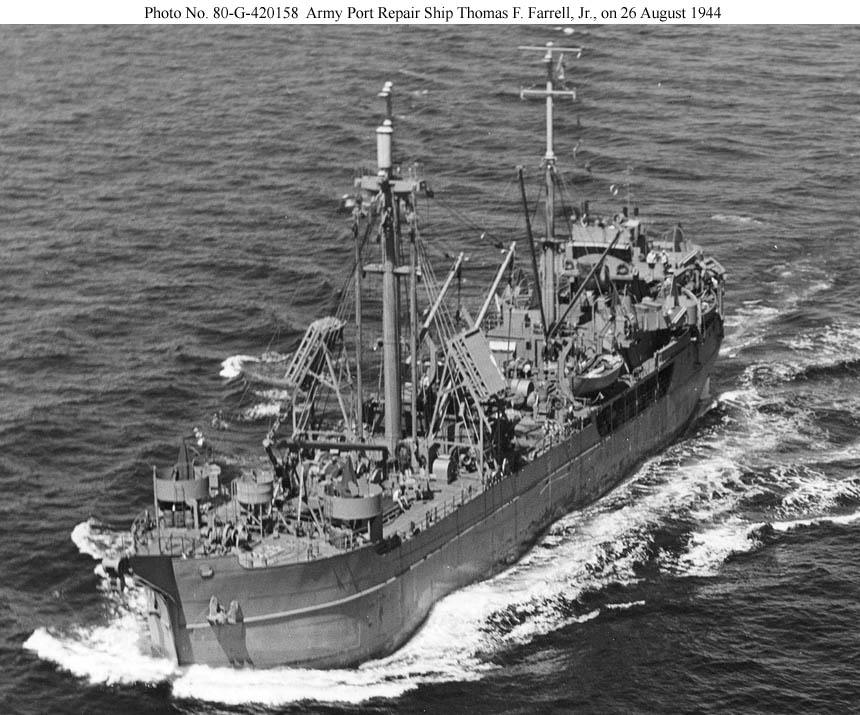
- Sister ship USAPRS Thomas F. Farrel, Jr. underway off the East Coast of the United States, 26 August 1944. US National Archives photo # 80-G-420158 RG-80-G, a US Navy photo now in the collections of the US National Archives.

History

United States
- Ordered: as MV Moses Pike; N3-M-A1 hull, MC hull 650
- Laid down: 24 January 1944
- Launched: 9 July 1944
- Acquired: 18 July 1944
- Out of service: 1959
- Stricken: date unknown
- Fate: Transferred to MSTS, 26 April 1952; Sold for scrapping, 22 January 1976

General characteristics
- Displacement: 1,677 t.(lt), 5,202 t.(fl)
- Length: 269 ft 10 in (82.25 m)
- Beam: 42 ft 6 in (12.95 m)
- Draught: 20 ft 9 in (6.32 m)
- Propulsion: Diesel, single shaft, 1,300shp
- Speed: 10 kts.
- Notes: The ship was under Navy supervision during construction, transferred to Army upon delivery to Navy and underwent extensive modifications for operation by the Corps of Engineers as a port repair ship. Subsequent Naval service was as unarmed, civilian crewed USNS Sagitta (T-AK-87).

Sagitta (AK-87) (Note: Only USS Enceladus (AK-80) of the ten ships of the Enceladus class, composed of Maritime Commission N3-M-A1 type small cargo vessels, saw significant naval service. Of the other nine, excepting USS Hydra (AK-82), all were transferred within months or days of shipyard delivery to Navy to the Army. Hydra was transferred to Army shortly after commissioning and trials. Navy had assumed the administration of contracts for these ships from the Maritime Commission on 1 January 1943 during or before construction and thus most were only administratively Navy, including names and numbers, during construction.) was never commissioned and thus never bore the USS designation.

The ship, contracted as the United States Maritime Commission MV Moses Pike, transferred to Navy supervision for construction and was then transferred shortly after launch as Sagitta (AK-87) to the Army to become the Engineer Port Repair Ship Marvin Lyle Thomas. She was one of two such repair ships transferred to Navy in 1952 and served as the civilian crewed, unarmed USNS Sagitta (T-AK-87). The ship may have been unique among her type in being then transferred back to the Army in 1966.

== Construction ==
The ship was a Maritime Commission type N3-M-A1 cargo vessel hull (MC hull 650) assigned the name MV Moses Pike. The ship was transferred to Navy supervision for construction at the Penn-Jersey Shipbuilding Corporation, Camden, New Jersey and renamed Sagitta. The ship was launched on 9 July 1944 sponsored by Mrs. Frank L. Hare.

== Transfer to Army ==
On 18 July 1944 the ship was transferred to the United States Army for conversion into the Engineer Port Repair Ship Marvin Lyle Thomas for operation by the United States Army Corps of Engineers rehabilitating war damaged ports.

Marvin Lyle Thomas was one of the two last ships converted and was operational too late to participate in the postwar port rehabilitation to a significant degree. Like her sister repair ship, Joe C. Specker (ex Vela (AK-89)), she remained operational with the Army until transferred to Navy's Military Sea Transportation Service (MSTS) in 1952.

== MSTS service career ==
Transferred from the Army to the Navy under assignment to the Military Sea Transportation Service on 26 April 1952, Sagitta operated as a summer DEW line resupply ship out of New York City from 1952 through 1959. She steamed annually to St. Johns and Argentia, Newfoundland; and to Goose Bay, Labrador. She also voyaged to Cartwright, Labrador, annually except in 1954; to Makkovick, Labrador, annually from 1957 through 1959; to Resolution Island, Northwest Territories, annually except in 1952 and 1957; and to Narsarsauk, Greenland, in June 1954 and 1957. During the winters, she carried cargo to Bermuda; San Juan, Puerto Rico; and Cristobal, Panama Canal Zone, annually from 1953 through 1955; and to Guantánamo Bay, Cuba, in 1956. Occasionally sailing across the Atlantic Ocean, she visited Piraeus, Greece, from 9 to 12 February 1957, and Port Lyautey, Morocco, from 2 to 6 February 1958.

== Transfer Back to Army ==
Transferred to the Maritime Administration on 23 February 1960, she remained in the National Defense Reserve Fleet until 25 April 1966 when she was transferred to the Army for duty as a training vessel, first at Fort Eustis, Virginia, then in about 1972 at Bayboro Harbor, St. Petersburg, Florida as USAV Resource (Note: Reference is a MS Word (.doc) from the United States Army Transportation School, Ft. Eustis, Virginia titled 231st Transportation Company (Floating Craft) (USAR). Clicking the link will download the document. The referenced document contains an error in the comment indicating the FS-756 was the same as an "H 12 Model" as the FS and H/HA vessels were not identical. Further, though servicing "Texas Towers" may have been included in missions, smaller vessels generally served the towers and Sagitta missions noted above were heavier transport to shore installations.) and then at Curtis Bay, Maryland, where she provided stevedore training.

The vessel was scrapped in 1976.
