= Mira (AK-84) =

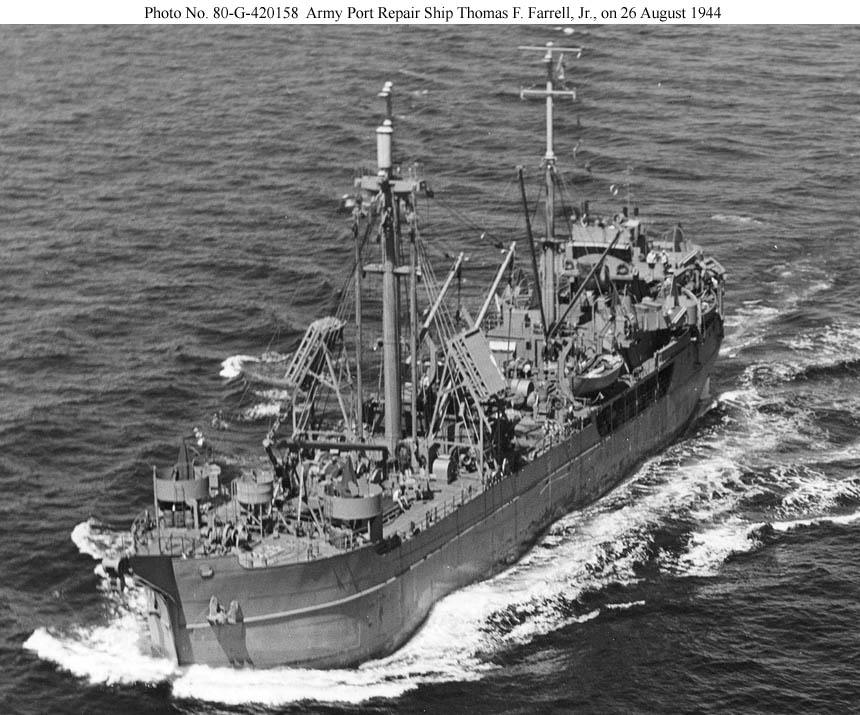
- Sister ship, USAPRS Thomas F. Farrel, Jr. underway off the East Coast of the United States, 26 August 1944. US National Archives photo # 80-G-420158 RG-80-G, a US Navy photo now in the collections of the US National Archives.

History

United States
- Name: Mira
- Namesake: Mira, a star in the constellation Cetus (The Whale)
- Ordered: as N3-M-A1 hull, MC hull 469
- Builder: Penn‑Jersey Shipbuilding Corporation, Camden, New Jersey
- Laid down: 22 May 1943, as MV William Nott
- Launched: 31 October 1943
- Sponsored by: Mrs. Clementine C. O’Brien
- Acquired: 6 November 1943
- Commissioned: Never
- Stricken: 16 November 1943
- Fate: Transferred to U.S. Army 7 November 1943
- Notes: Became U.S. Army port repair ship Robert M. Emery; Sold for scrapping 1966

General characteristics
- Class & type: Enceladus-class cargo ship
- Displacement: 1,677 tons (light); 5,202 tons (full load)
- Length: 269 ft 10 in (82.25 m)
- Beam: 42 ft 6 in (12.95 m)
- Draught: 20 ft 9 in (6.32 m)
- Installed power: 1,300 shp (970 kW)
- Propulsion: diesel engines, single shaft
- Speed: 10 knots (19 km/h; 12 mph)
- Notes: The ship was Navy only during construction, transferred to Army upon delivery to Navy and underwent extensive modifications for operation by the Corps of Engineers as a port repair ship.

Mira (AK-84) (Note: Only USS Enceladus (AK-80) of the ten ships of the Enceladus class, composed of Maritime Commission N3-M-A1 type small cargo vessels, saw significant naval service. Of the other nine, excepting USS Hydra (AK-82), all were transferred within months or days of shipyard delivery to Navy to the Army. Hydra was transferred to Army shortly after commissioning and trials. Navy had assumed the administration of contracts for these ships from the Maritime Commission on 1 January 1943 during or before construction and thus most were only administratively Navy, including names and numbers, during construction.) was never commissioned and thus never bore the USS designation. The ship was transferred to become the U.S. Army Corps of Engineers Port Repair ship Robert M. Emery the day after acquisition by Navy.

== Construction ==
The ship, one of 109 Maritime Commission N-type coastal cargo ships built, was laid down under Maritime Commission contract by Penn-Jersey Shipbuilding Corporation, Camden, New Jersey, 22 May 1943 as MV William Nott, a Maritime Commission type N3-M-A1 cargo vessel. The ship was launched 31 October 1943; sponsored by Mrs. Clementine C. O’Brien; acquired by the U.S. Navy 6 November 1943 for service as Mira (AK-84). However, she was never commissioned and was transferred to the Army 7 November 1943. Her name was struck from the Navy list 16 November 1943.

== Army career ==
Mira was renamed Robert M. Emery in 1944 for First Lieutenant Robert M. Emery of the U.S. Army Corps of Engineers serving with the 1st Infantry Division and killed in action on 8 November 1942 in Algeria. Lieutenant Emery was presented the Distinguished Service Cross posthumously for his action on that date. Emery Barracks was also named in his honor.

Robert M. Emery was among the first four of the N3-M-A1 types converted for use as a U.S. Army Corps of Engineers port repair ship. The conversion work was done by Bethlehem Steel Co., Inc., Brooklyn, New York, in mid 1944.

Robert M. Emery joined her three sister ships and the converted Great Lakes steamer Junior N. Van Noy as one of the five ships leaving in late summer of 1944 for operations in Europe. She then began operations at ports in the United Kingdom, North Africa, and France. She was the only member of that group to operate in the Pacific Ocean, going there in July 1945 to operate in the Hawaiian Islands between September and November. Subsequently, she returned to the United States West Coast for transfer to the Maritime Commission. Mira was returned to the Maritime Commission. She eventually was sold for scrapping in 1966.

== Civilian usage ==
Instead of scrapping the ship was sold to Canadian interests in 1966 and towed to Victoria, British Columbia and reportedly docked at the foot of Fort Street until resale in 1969. The U.S. buyers converted the ship to an attraction at Fisherman's Wharf in San Francisco, California until 1970 when the ship was towed to Astoria, Washington and apparently scrapped in Tacoma, Washington during late 1984.
