= Nashira (AK-85) =

Never-commissioned American ship

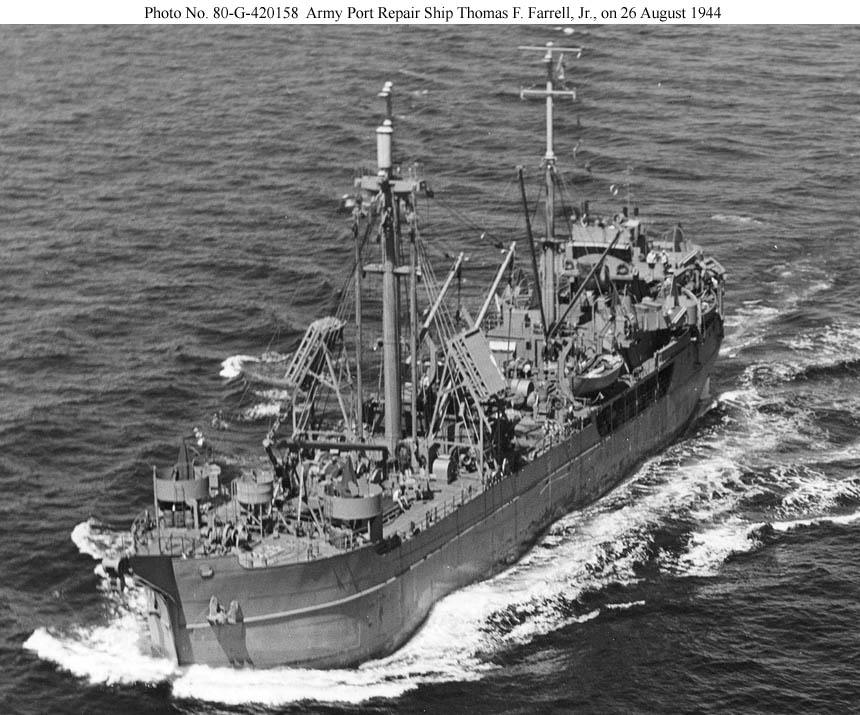
- Sister ship USAPRS Thomas F. Farrel, Jr. underway off the East Coast of the United States, 26 August 1944. US National Archives photo # 80-G-420158 RG-80-G, a US Navy photo now in the collections of the US National Archives.

History

United States
- Name: Nashira (1943—1944); Richard R. Arnold (1944-1947)
- Ordered: as Josiah Paul, transferred to Navy for construction as Nashira
- Builder: Penn-Jersey Shipbuilding Company, Camden, New Jersey
- Laid down: 1 November 1943
- Launched: 23 April 1944
- Acquired: 25 April 1944 (delivered to Navy/transferred to Army)
- Commissioned: Never commissioned
- In service: 1944-1947 (U.S. Army)
- Out of service: 1947
- Renamed: Nashira, 30 October 1943; Richard R. Arnold, 25 April 1944
- Stricken: 9 June 1944
- Fate: Sold March 1965 to Kelbar, Inc. for scrap

General characteristics
- Class & type: Navy: Enceladus-class cargo ship
- Type: N3–M–A1 cargo ship
- Displacement: 1,677 long tons (1,704 t) light; 5,202 long tons (5,285 t) full
- Length: 269 ft 10 in (82.25 m)
- Beam: 42 ft 6 in (12.95 m)
- Draft: 20 ft 9 in (6.32 m)
- Propulsion: Diesel, single shaft, 1,300 shp (969 kW)
- Speed: 10 knots (19 km/h; 12 mph)
- Notes: The ship was Navy only during construction, transferred to Army upon delivery to Navy and underwent extensive modifications for operation by the Corps of Engineers as a port repair ship.

Nashira (AK-85) was planned as a civilian cargo ship for the United States Maritime Commission, transferred to the Navy for construction then transferred to the U.S. Army and renamed two days after launching. The ship was never commissioned, thus never bore the USS designation, and had no significant naval service. (Note: Only USS Enceladus (AK-80) of the ten ships of the Enceladus class, composed of Maritime Commission N3-M-A1 type small cargo vessels, saw significant naval service. Of the other nine, excepting USS Hydra (AK-82), all were transferred within months or days of shipyard delivery to Navy to the Army. Hydra was transferred to Army shortly after commissioning and trials. Navy had assumed the administration of contracts for these ships from the Maritime Commission on 1 January 1943 during or before construction and thus most were only administratively Navy, including names and numbers, during construction.) The ship was converted to the U.S. Army Engineer Port Repair ship Richard R. Arnold and served in the Pacific during 1945.

== Construction and launch ==
Nashira (AK-85), named after Nashira, the third-brightest star in the constellation Capricorn, was a Maritime Commission type N3-M-A1 cargo vessel originally assigned the name Josiah Paul. The ship was transferred from the control of the Maritime Commission to the U.S. Navy 1 January 1943, prior to the start of construction.

Renamed Nashira 30 October 1943, she was laid down by Penn-Jersey Shipbuilding Corp., Camden, New Jersey, 1 November 1943; launched 23 April 1944; sponsored by Miss Patricia Palmer; delivered to the Navy 25 April 1944; and transferred to the U.S. Army the same day for use as a U.S. Army Port Repair ship. Nashira was struck from the Navy List 9 June 1944.

== Army Port Repair Ship ==
The Army renamed the ship Richard R. Arnold after an Engineer officer, Colonel Richard R. Arnold, on General Eisenhower's personal staff killed by a mine 6 June 1943 in North Africa while commanding the 20th Engineer Regiment. The ship and its crew served as part of the Army Corps of Engineers (1070th Engineer Service Detachment) in the Pacific during 1945, participated in the Battle of Luzon (Philippines), crossed the equator four times, was present in Japan after the war, and returned to San Francisco on 24 December 1945.

== Disposal ==
Richard R. Arnold was turned in to the Maritime Commission for disposal 17 July 1947 and placed in the Suisun Bay Reserve Fleet where it remained until sold for $31,151 on 4 March 1965 to Kelbar, Inc. for scrap.
