= Europa (AK-81) =

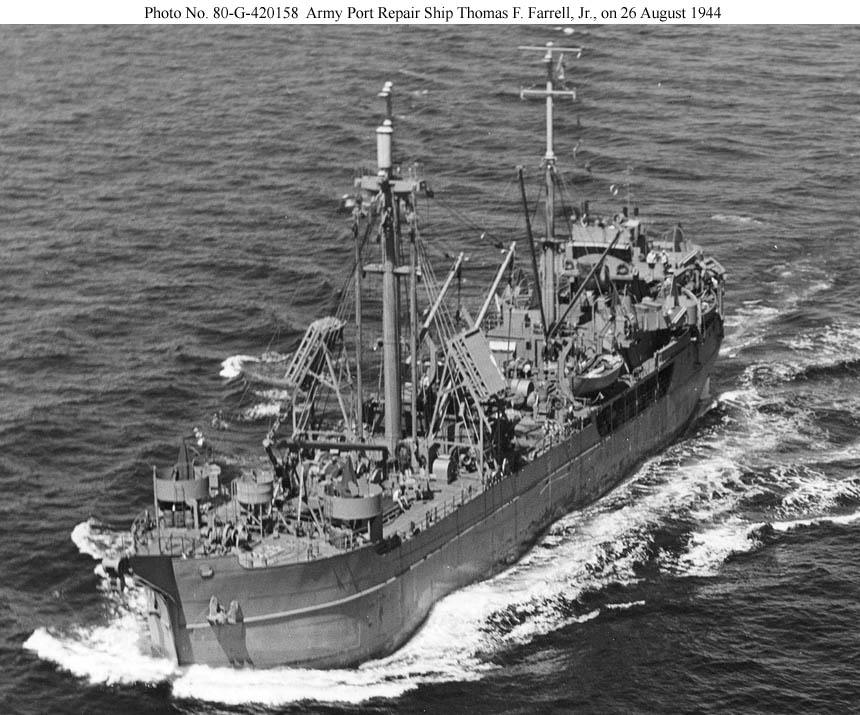
- USAPRS Thomas F. Farrell, Jr. underway off the East Coast of the United States, 26 August 1944. US National Archives photo # 80-G-420158 RG-80-G, a US Navy photo now in the collections of the US National Archives.

History

United States
- Name: Europa, ex MV William Lester
- Builder: Penn-Jersey Shipbuilding Company, Camden, New Jersey
- Laid down: 2 March 1942
- Launched: 7 December 1942
- Acquired: By Navy uncompleted 24 November 1943 transferred to U.S. Army 25 November 1943
- Renamed: by Army Thomas F. Farrell, Jr.
- Stricken: 6 December 1943
- Fate: Scrapped, 1967

General characteristics
- Class & type: Enceladus-class cargo ship
- Displacement: 1,677 long tons (1,704 t) light; 5,202 long tons (5,285 t) full
- Length: 269 ft 10 in (82.25 m)
- Beam: 42 ft 6 in (12.95 m)
- Draft: 20 ft 9 in (6.32 m)
- Propulsion: Diesel, single shaft, 1,300 shp (969 kW)
- Speed: 10 knots (19 km/h; 12 mph)
- Complement: 83 officers and enlisted
- Armament: 1 × 3"/50 caliber gun

Europa (AK-81) (Note: Only USS Enceladus (AK-80) of the ten ships of the Enceladus class, composed of Maritime Commission N3-M-A1 type small cargo vessels, saw significant naval service. Of the other nine, excepting USS Hydra (AK-82), all were transferred within months or days of shipyard delivery to Navy to the Army. Hydra was transferred to Army shortly after commissioning and trials. The Navy had assumed the administration of contracts for these ships from the Maritime Commission on 1 January 1943 during or before construction and thus most were only administratively Navy, including names and numbers, during construction.) was never commissioned and thus never bore the USS designation.

The ship was laid down 2 March 1942 as MV William Lester, a Maritime Commission type (N3-M-A1) hull, under Maritime Commission contract (MC hull 464), at the Penn-Jersey Shipbuilding Company of Camden, New Jersey and launched 7 December 1942. Assigned to the Navy as Europa (AK-81), named for Europa, the smallest of the Galilean moons of planet Jupiter, scheduled to become an Enceladus-class cargo ship. She was delivered to the Navy uncompleted 24 November 1943; transferred the next day, 25 November 1943, to the United States Army; stricken from Navy lists 6 December 1943.

The ship, renamed Thomas F. Farrell Jr., after an engineering officer killed 25 February 1944 at Anzio, began conversion in December, 1943 to an Engineer Port Repair ship manned by a military crew under the U.S. Army Corps of Engineers. (Note: Thomas F. Farrell Jr. was the son of Major General Thomas Francis Farrell.) The ship did not complete conversion until 30 April 1944 and did not sail for Europe until late summer. The ship was one of the port repair ships making it to Europe in time to assist in the restoration of ports.

Thomas F. Farrell Jr. was laid up in the reserve fleet at Suisun Bay on 12 June 1947 and sold to Zidell Explorations, Inc. by Maritime Administration sale 14 April 1965 for non-transportation use. The ship was scrapped in 1967.
