= Media (AK-83) =

World War II US navy ship

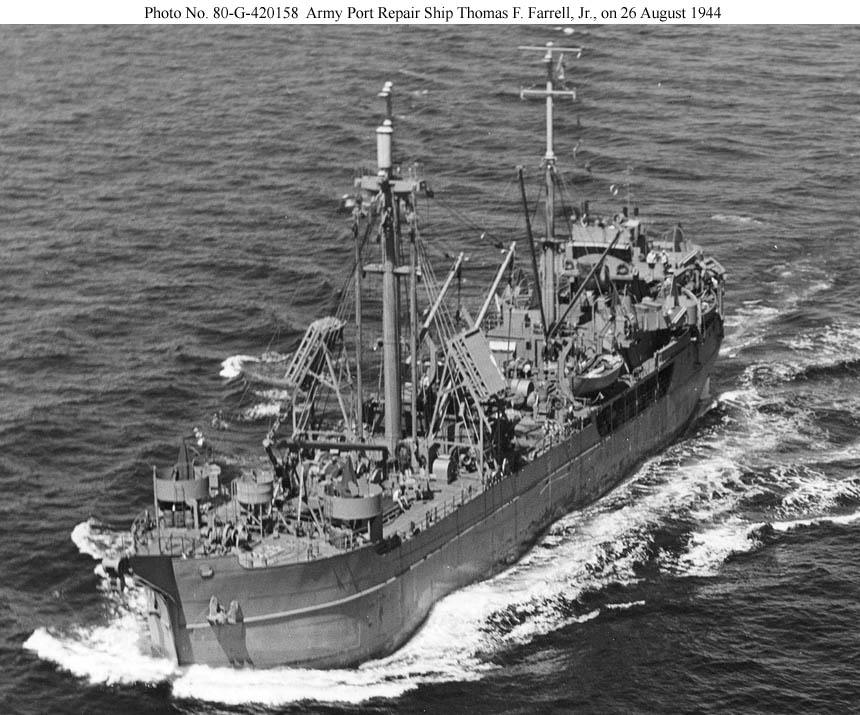
- Sister ship USAPRS Thomas F. Farrel, Jr. underway off the East Coast of the United States, 26 August 1944. US National Archives photo # 80-G-420158 RG-80-G, a US Navy photo now in the collections of the US National Archives.

History

United States
- Ordered: N3-M-A1 hull, MC hull 468
- Laid down: Laid down, 28 January 1943, as MV Oliver R. Mumford
- Launched: 29 August 1943
- Commissioned: Never commissioned
- Stricken: 24 November 1943, scrapped in 1968
- Fate: Transferred to the U.S. Army; as Glenn Gerald Griswold

General characteristics
- Displacement: 1,677 t.(lt), 5,202 t.(fl)
- Length: 269 ft 10 in (82.25 m)
- Beam: 42 ft 6 in (12.95 m)
- Draught: 20 ft 9 in (6.32 m)
- Propulsion: Diesel, single shaft, 1,300shp
- Speed: 10 kts.
- Notes: The ship was Navy only during construction, transferred to Army upon delivery to Navy and underwent extensive modifications for operation by the Corps of Engineers as a port repair ship.

Media (AK-83) (Note: Only USS Enceladus (AK-80) of the ten ships of the Enceladus class, composed of Maritime Commission N3-M-A1 type small cargo vessels, saw significant naval service. Of the other nine, excepting USS Hydra (AK-82), all were transferred within months or days of shipyard delivery to Navy to the Army. Hydra was transferred to Army shortly after commissioning and trials. Navy had assumed the administration of contracts for these ships from the Maritime Commission on 1 January 1943 during or before construction and thus most were only administratively Navy, including names and numbers, during construction.) was a World War II US navy ship that was never commissioned and thus never bore the USS designation.

Media (AK-83) was contracted to be built as Oliver R. Mumford under Maritime Commission contract 4 September 1941 as a type N3-M-A1 cargo ship. She was acquired by the Navy 1 January 1943 before being laid down by Penn-Jersey Shipbuilding Corp., Camden, New Jersey, 28 January 1943; launched 29 August 1943; sponsored by Mrs. Ernest G. Bornheimer; completed and delivered to Navy on 17 November 1943.

That same day Media was delivered to the U.S. Army and struck from the Navy list on 24 November 1943. The ship was renamed Glenn Gerald Griswold after an engineering officer killed while fighting a dump fire in Naples, Italy. The Glenn Gerald Griswold was converted into a port repair ship by the Bethlehem Fairfield Shipyard, Baltimore, Maryland, on 5 June 1944 and sailed for Europe by summer's end. After the postwar work the ship was placed in the reserve fleet.
