= Tucana (AK-88) =

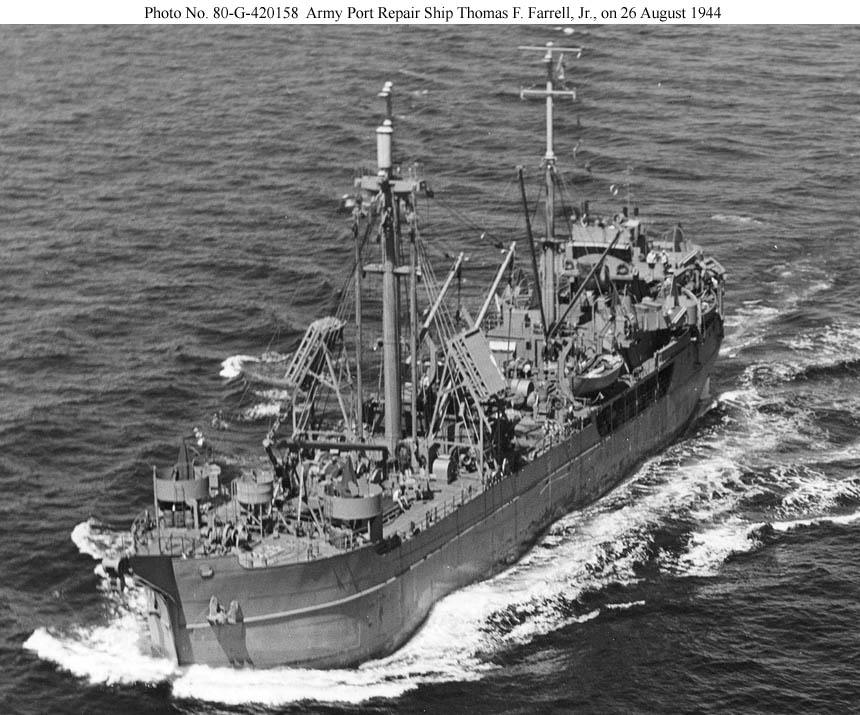
- Sister ship USAPRS Thomas F. Farrell, Jr. underway off the East Coast of the United States, 26 August 1944. US National Archives photo # 80-G-420158 RG-80-G, a US Navy photo now in the collections of the US National Archives.

History

United States
- Ordered: as MV Symmes Potter; N3-M-A1 hull, MC hull 651
- Builder: Penn-Jersey Shipbuilding Corp.
- Laid down: 24 April 1944
- Launched: 13 September 1944
- Stricken: 13 September 1944
- Fate: Transferred to the U.S. Army; scrapped in 1968

General characteristics
- Displacement: 1,677 t.(lt), 5,202 t.(fl)
- Length: 269 ft 10 in (82.25 m)
- Beam: 42 ft 6 in (12.95 m)
- Draft: 20 ft 9 in (6.32 m)
- Propulsion: diesel, single shaft, 1,300shp
- Speed: 10 kts.
- Complement: 83
- Armament: 3 in (76 mm) dual purpose gun mount

Tucana (AK-88) (Note: Only USS Enceladus (AK-80) of the ten ships of the Enceladus class, composed of Maritime Commission N3-M-A1 type small cargo vessels, saw significant naval service. Of the other nine, excepting USS Hydra (AK-82), all were transferred within months or days of shipyard delivery to Navy to the Army. Hydra was transferred to Army shortly after commissioning and trials. Navy had assumed the administration of contracts for these ships from the Maritime Commission on 1 January 1943 during or before construction and thus most were only administratively Navy, including names and numbers, during construction.) was never commissioned and thus never bore the USS designation. She was transferred upon launching on 13 September 1944 to the U.S. Army as the U.S. Army Engineer Port Repair ship Arthur C. Ely.

== Service career ==
AK-88 was originally authorized under Maritime Commission contract (MC hull 651) and assigned the name MV Symmes Potter. The name Tucana was assigned to her by the Navy on 30 October 1942; and, on 1 January 1943, her contract was transferred from the Maritime Commission to the supervision of the Navy; AK-88 to become an Enceladus-class cargo ship. The ship was laid down on 24 April 1944 at Camden, New Jersey, by the Penn-Jersey Shipbuilding Corp.; launched on 13 September 1944; and sponsored by Mrs. Patrick J. Cushing. On that same day, she was reassigned and delivered to the Army, and her name was struck from the Navy list.

She was converted by the U.S. Army to serve as the U.S. Army Engineer Port Repair ship Arthur C. Ely. The ship was not among the converted vessels first deployed overseas in the last half of 1944.
