= Norma (AK-86) =

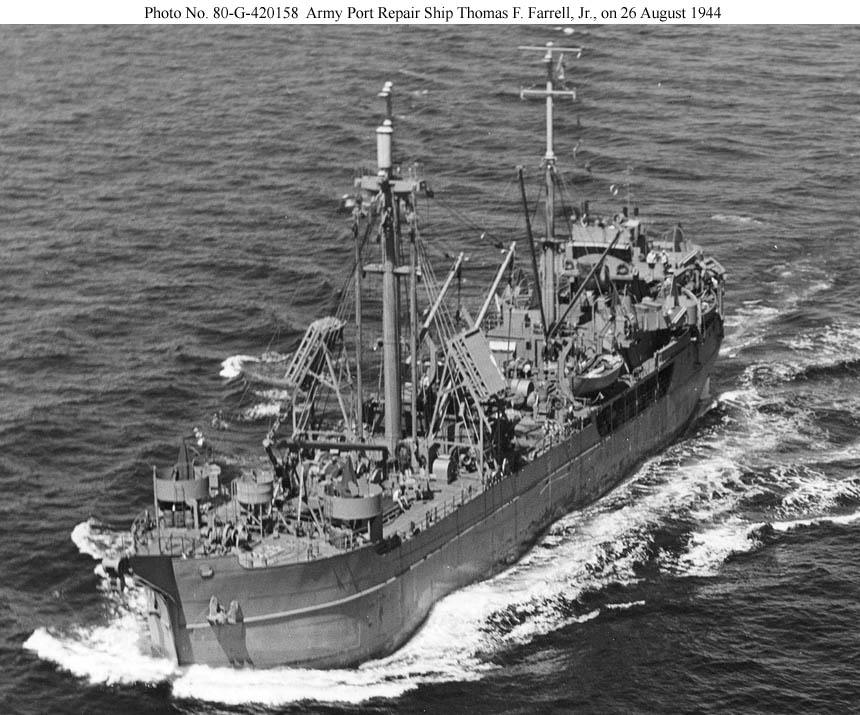
- Sister ship USAPRS Thomas F. Farrel, Jr. underway off the East Coast of the United States, 26 August 1944. US National Archives photo # 80-G-420158 RG-80-G, a US Navy photo now in the collections of the US National Archives.

History

United States
- Name: Norma
- Namesake: Constellation Norma
- Ordered: as MV Sumner Pierce, N3-M-A1 hull, MC hull 649
- Builder: Penn-Jersey Shipbuilding Corp.
- Laid down: 3 December 1943
- Launched: 4 June 1944
- Sponsored by: Mrs. Joseph Kijek
- Acquired: by Navy and transferred to U.S. Army 6 June 1944
- Renamed: Norma (AK-86) 30 October 1942; Transferred to the U.S. Army 6 June 1944 for conversion to the Port Repair ship Henry Wright Hurley
- Stricken: by Navy 28 June 1944
- Fate: Sold 31 March 1965 to Zidell Explorations, Inc., Portland, Oregon for scrapping.
- Notes: Norma (AK-86) was never commissioned and never saw service with the U.S. Navy.

General characteristics
- Displacement: 1,677 t.(lt), 5,202 t.(fl)
- Length: 269 ft 10 in (82.25 m)
- Beam: 42 ft 6 in (12.95 m)
- Draft: 20 ft 9 in (6.32 m)
- Propulsion: Diesel, single shaft, 1,300shp
- Speed: 10 kn (19 km/h; 12 mph).
- Complement: 83
- Armament: Navy design: 3 in (76 mm) dual purpose gun mount
- Notes: The ship was never commissioned and never saw U.S. Naval service. Conversion into a Port Repair ship radically altered design and appearance (See photos of a Port Repair ship returned to Navy).

Norma (AK-86) (Note: Only USS Enceladus (AK-80) of the ten-ship Enceladus-class, composed of Maritime Commission N3-M-A1` type small cargo vessels, saw significant naval service. The other nine, except USS Hydra (AK-82), were transferred within months or days of shipyard delivery from the Navy to the Army. Hydra was transferred to Army shortly after commissioning and trials. The Navy had assumed administration of the contracts for these ships from the Maritime Commission on 1 January 1943 during or before construction so most were only administratively Navy, including names and numbers, during construction.) was never commissioned and thus never bore the USS designation. Norma is the name of constellation.

The ship was built as a Maritime Commission type N3-M-A1 cargo vessel at Penn-Jersey Shipbuilding Corp. intended for naval and Lend Lease service as M.C. hull 649 assigned the name MV Summer Pierce before being laid down on 3 December 1943. The ship was renamed and designated Norma (AK-86), 30 October 1942 intended as an Enceladus-class cargo ship for the U.S. Navy. Norma was delivered to the Navy on 6 June 1944 and transferred to the U.S. Army on the same day. Norma was renamed Henry Wright Hurley by the Army and began conversion into a U.S. Army Engineer Port Repair ship for service with the U.S. Army Corps of Engineers.

== Army Port Repair Ship ==
The Army converted the ship into one of ten Engineer Port Repair ships for use by the Army Engineers in clearing war damaged ports. These ships were extensively modified with a distinctive appearance the result of heavy lift bow horns with a forty-ton lift capacity. The converted ship saw little or no service as intended as it was one of the conversions completed in 1945.

== Final disposition ==
The ship was returned to the Maritime Administration 8 August 1947 and sent into the National Defense Reserve Fleet, Suisun Bay, Benicia, California. On 31 March 1965 Henry Wright Hurley was sold to Zidell Explorations, Inc., Portland, Oregon for scrapping.
