= Coastal trading vessel =

Shallow-hulled ships used for trading with ports along the same shoreline

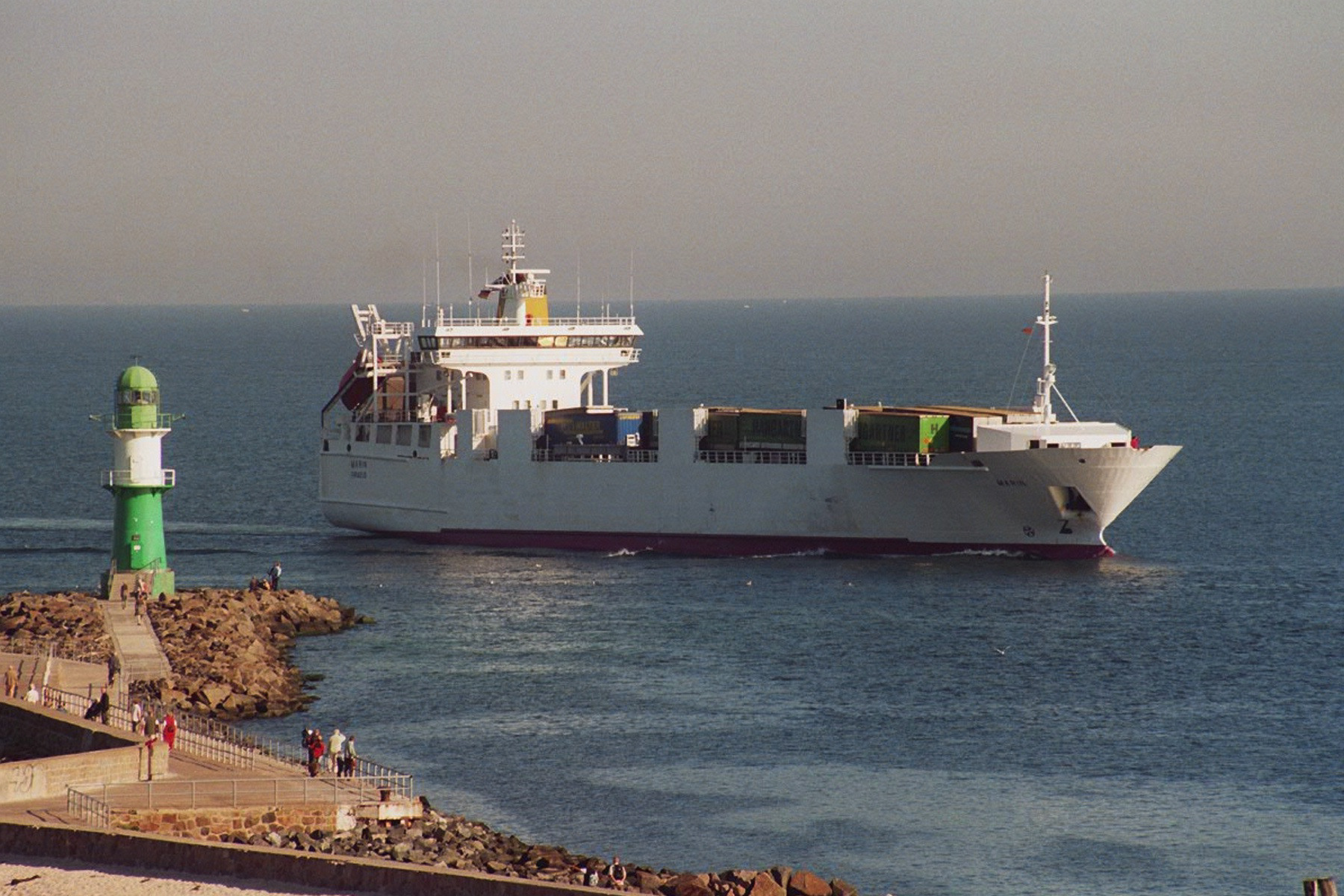
Coastal merchant vessel

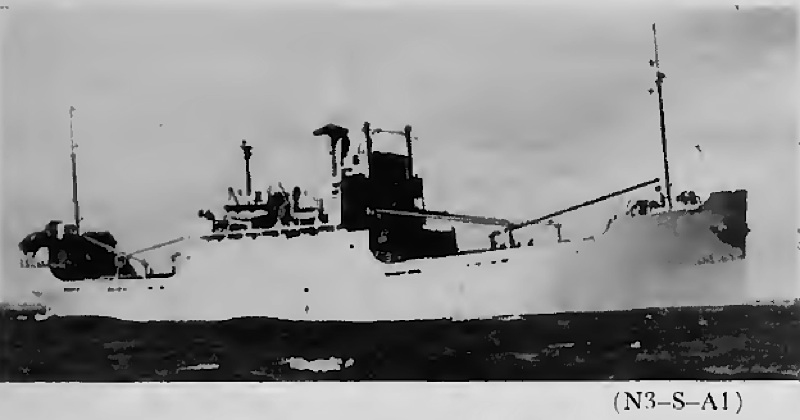
N3-S-A1 illustration from American World Traders-New Ships for the Merchant Marine, 1945

Coastal trading vessels, also known as coasters or skoots, are shallow-hulled merchant ships used for transporting cargo along a coastline. Their shallow hulls mean that they can get through reefs where deeper-hulled seagoing ships usually cannot (26–28 feet), but as a result they are not optimized for the large waves found on the open ocean. Coasters can load and unload cargo in shallow ports.

For European inland waterways they are limited in size by the navigable dimensions of those waterways. E.g. ships on the French waterways are limited to the Freycinet gauge of 38.5m length, 5.05m breadth, and 2.5m draft.

== World War II ==
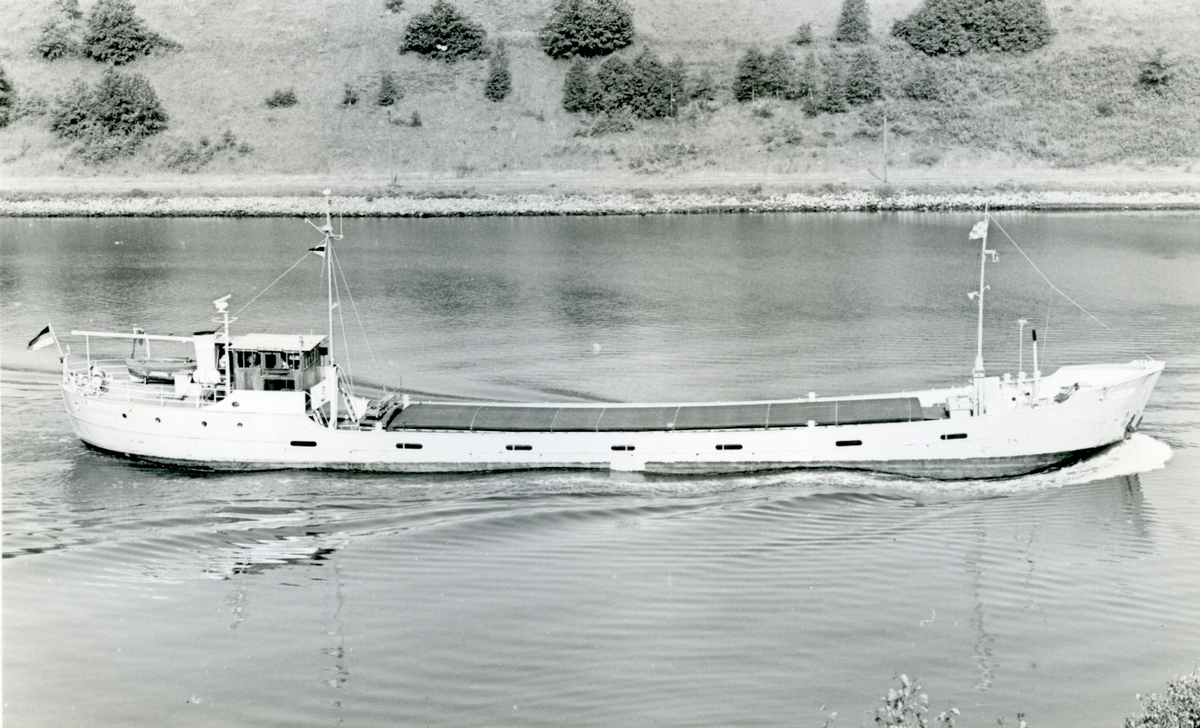
MS Unterelbe (1939) - a WW2 era coaster and the oldest operable Diesel coaster remaining in the UK

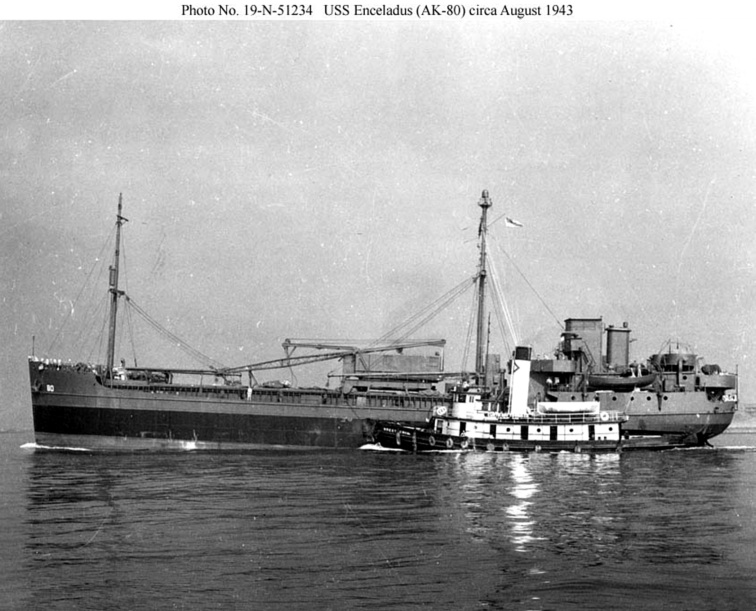
N3-M-A1 as USS Enceladus (AK-80), August 1943 in original Navy configuration. Note Whirley crane, a part of the original N3-M-A1 design.

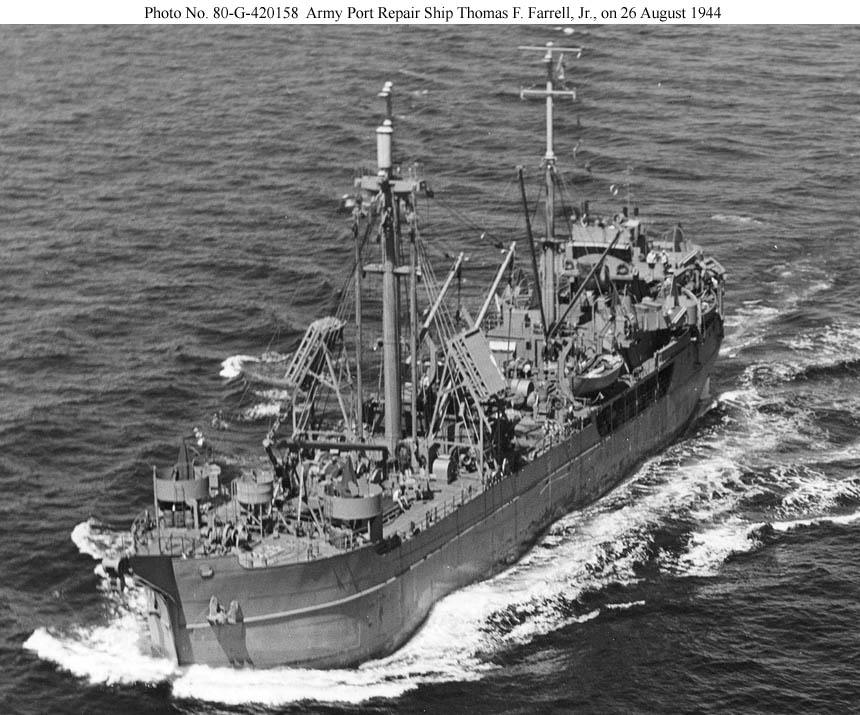
Europa (AK-81) underway off the East Coast of the United States, 26 August 1944.

During World War II there was a demand for coasters to support troops around the world.

Type N3 ship and Type C1 ship were the designations for small cargo ships built for the United States Maritime Commission before and during World War II. Both were use for close to shore and short cargo runs. The United Kingdom used Empire ships type Empire F as merchant ships for coastal shipping. British seamen called these "Chants", possibly because they had the same hull form as Channel Tankers; initially all the tankers were sold to foreign owners and therefore there was no conflict in nomenclature. The USA and UK both used coastal tankers too. UK used Empire coaster tankers and T1 tankers. Many coasters had some armament, such as a 5-inch (127 mm) stern gun, 3-inch (76.2 mm) bow anti-aircraft gun and Oerlikon 20 mm anti-aircraft gun. These were removed after the war.

After the war many of the ships were sold to private companies all around the world.

== Shipyards ==
Major coastal trading vessel shipyards include:

- Avondale Shipyard and Marine Ways
- Consolidated Steel Corporation (Long Beach & Wilmington)
- Froemming Brothers
- Globe Shipbuilding Company
- Ingalls Shipbuilding Corporation (Decatur, AL)
- J. A. Jones Construction Company (Brunswick)
- Kaiser Richmond No. 4
- Leathem D. Smith Shipbuilding Company
- Pennsylvania Shipyards Inc.
- Southeastern Shipbuilding Corporation
- Walter Butler Shipbuilders Inc. (Superior and Duluth)

== See also ==
- Short sea shipping
- Bangkokmax ships (172x28.4x8,08m)
- Bangkok Port (172m length, 25m beam -with special permit 30m-, 8,2m draft), Bangkokmax of 1944 TEU
- Seawaymax (USA Great Lakes docks, 8,08m draft), Chesapeake & Delaware Canal (draft 10,7m)
- Type C1 ship standard allies coastal transport ships in World War II
