= Emery Barracks =

- Emery Barracks (Germany)

Site information
- Type: Military Garrison
- Condition: Closed

Location
- Coordinates: 49°48′24″N 009°53′16″E

Site history
- In use: 1936–2008

Garrison information
- Occupants: Reichswehr (1936-1938); Wehrmacht (1938-1945); U.S. Army (1945-1990)

Emery Barracks was a former military garrison located near Veitshöchheim, a municipality in the district of Würzburg, in Bavaria, Germany. It was situated on the right bank of the Main, 4 kilometres (2 mi) northwest of Würzburg. It was active as a military base from the 1930s through 1992, and was later used to house refugees and asylum seekers. It was bounded on the northwest by Albert-Einstein-Straße, to the southwest by B27, to the southeast by Pfaffenbergstraße, and to the northeast by Alfred-Nobel-Straße.

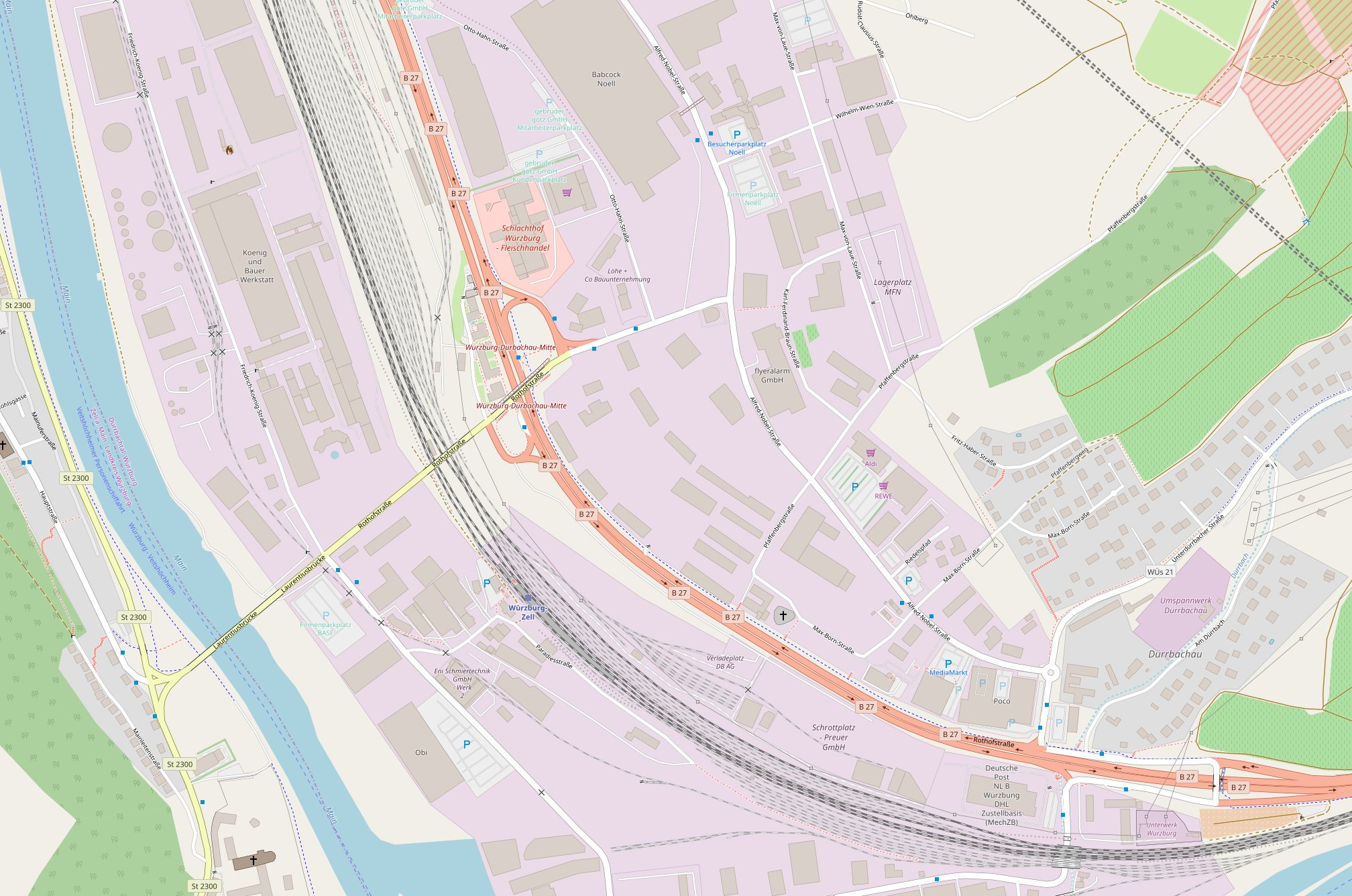
Map of the area formerly known as Emery Barracks

== History ==
The kaserne (English: barracks) was constructed in the 1930s on the Nord-Kaserne (English: Northern Barracks), on the northern edge of the city of Würzburg. It was renamed Adolf-Hitler-Kaserne in 1938 and served as the home of the Panzernachrichtenabteilung Nr. 38 (English: Tank Communications Detachment No. 38). At the end of World War II, the facility was occupied by the US Army.

== 1LT Robert M. Emery ==
Robert MacNab Emery was born 5 September, 1911, in Ottawa, Ontario, Canada, to Brigadier General Ambrose Robert Emery and Elizabeth Christie MacNab. His father, a life-long soldier, was Commander of the Infantry Replacement Training Center at Camp Wheeler, Georgia, during World War II. Robert studied Engineering at the Massachusetts Institute of Technology (MIT) from 1931 to 1934, enrolling in the Reserve Officers' Training Corps (ROTC). He was later commissioned into the U.S. Army Corps of Engineers. Emery was assigned to the 1st Infantry Division during Operation Torch in North Africa. He was killed in action on 8 November, 1942. Lieutenant Emery was presented the Distinguished Service Cross and Purple Heart posthumously for his actions on that date. (War Department, General Orders No. 6, February 9, 1943). The Distinguished Service Cross citation reads:

The President of the United States takes pride in presenting the Distinguished Service Cross (Posthumously) to Robert M. Emery (0-317400), First Lieutenant (Corps of Engineers), U.S. Army, for extraordinary heroism in connection with military operations against an armed enemy while serving with Headquarters, 1st Infantry Division, in action against enemy forces on 8 November 1942 in Algeria. First Lieutenant Emery made the supreme sacrifice while attempting single-handedly to eliminate an enemy machine gun nest holding up the advance of his unit at ***** [sic], Algeria. First Lieutenant Emery's intrepid actions, personal bravery and zealous devotion to duty at the cost of his life, exemplify the highest traditions of the military forces of the United States and reflect great credit upon himself, the 1st Infantry Division, and the United States Army.

Emery was buried in Plot H, Row 12, Grave 10, in the North Africa American Cemetery in Carthage, Tunisia.

== Naming ==
Nord-Kaserne, also known as Adolf-Hitler-Kaserne, was renamed Emery Barracks (also called Emery Kaserne) on 18 May, 1953 (HQ USAREUR General Order #42, 18 May, 1953), in honor of 1LT Robert M. Emery of the U.S. Army Corps of Engineers who served with the 1st Infantry Division and was killed in action on 8 November, 1942, near Djebel Mrdajajdo in Algeria. The N-type coastal cargo ship Mira (AK-84) was also renamed the U.S. Army Corps of Engineers Port Repair Ship Robert M. Emery in his honor.

== Closure ==
Emery Barracks was closed in 1990. Since 1992 it has served as the Asylbewerberheim des Freistaats Bayern (English: Asylum-seekers' Home of the Free State of Bavaria), housing up to 450 people from as many as 35 different nations.
