= Nicholas Minue =

Ukrainian American Medal of Honor recipient (1905–1943)

- Born: March 13, 1905; Sedden, Kingdom of Galicia and Lodomeria, Austria-Hungary
- Died: April 28, 1943 (aged 38); Medjez El Bab, Tunisia
- Burial place: North Africa American Cemetery and Memorial, Carthage, Tunisia
- Military career
- Allegiance: United States of America
- Branch: United States Army
- Service years: 1918, 1920-1925 (Navy), 1927–1943 (Army)
- Rank: Private (voluntarily reduced from Sergeant)
- Units: Company A, 1st Battalion, 6th Armored Infantry Regiment 1st Armored Division
- Conflicts: World War II; Operation Torch; Tunisian campaign; Operation Vulcan †
- Awards: Medal of Honor; Bronze Star Medal; Purple Heart; Good Conduct Medal; American Campaign Medal; European-African-Middle Eastern Campaign Medal; World War II Victory Medal; Combat Infantryman Badge

Nicholas Minue (March 13, 1905 – April 28, 1943) was a Ukrainian American and United States Army career veteran who received the Medal of Honor posthumously in World War II. Private Minue with fixed bayonet, singlehandedly assaulted and destroyed several enemy positions while under fire near Medjez El Bab, Tunisia, until he was fatally wounded.

== Biography ==
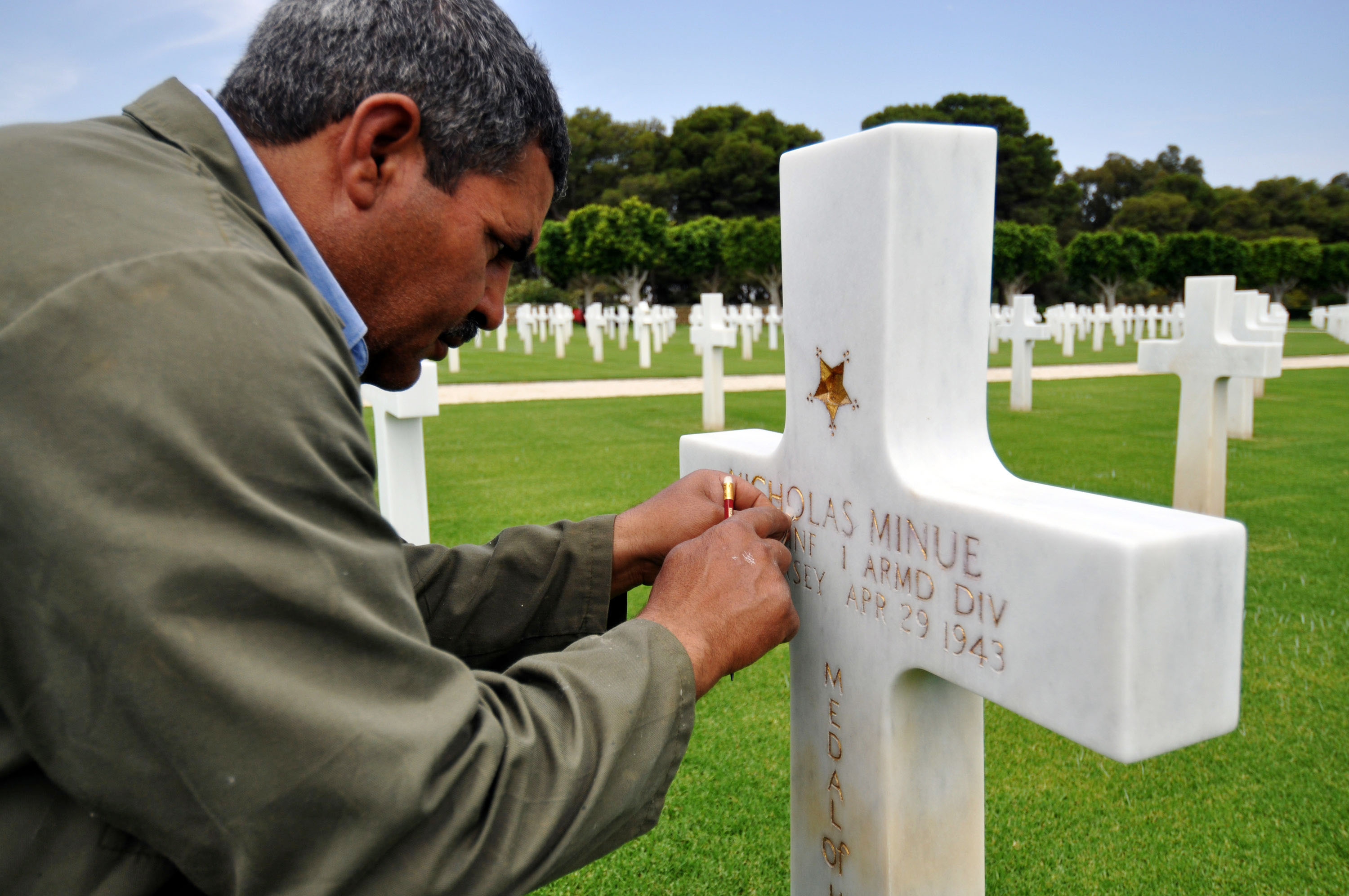
A stonemason refreshes the gold leaf on Minue's grave marker at North Africa American Cemetery before Memorial Day 2010.

Minue was born in Sedden, Kingdom of Galicia and Lodomeria to ethnic Ukrainian parents.

=== Military service ===
Minue enlisted in the United States Army in 1927 having previously served in the navy, from Carteret, New Jersey. He made the Army a career, and held the rank of sergeant when World War II began.

==== World War II ====
Minue wanted to serve overseas in a combat unit during World War II, and to do so, he volunteered to give up his rank of sergeant for the lower rank of private. In December 1942, he was assigned to a rifle platoon of Company A, 1st Battalion, 6th Armored Infantry Regiment in 1942.

Death and burial

Pvt. Minue was killed in action while fighting soldiers of German Field Marshal Rommel's Afrika Korps on April 28, 1943, during Operation Vulcan. He was awarded the Medal of Honor for his actions that day. He is buried in the North Africa American Cemetery and Memorial in Carthage, Tunisia. His grave can be found in Section E, Line 8. Grave 4.

== Medal of Honor citation ==
Rank and organization: Private, U.S. Army, Company A, 6th Armored Infantry, 1st Armored Division. Place and date: Near MedjezelBab, Tunisia, April 28, 1943. Entered service at: Carteret, N.J. Birth: Sedden, Poland. G.O. No.: 24, March 25, 1944.

Citation:

For distinguishing himself conspicuously by gallantry and intrepidity at the loss of his life above and beyond the call of duty in action with the enemy on 28 April 1943, in the vicinity of Majaz al Bab, Tunisia. When the advance of the assault elements of Company A was held up by flanking fire from an enemy machinegun nest, Pvt. Minue voluntarily, alone, and unhesitatingly, with complete disregard of his own welfare, charged the enemy entrenched position with fixed bayonet. Pvt. Minue assaulted the enemy under a withering machinegun and rifle fire, killing approximately 10 enemy machinegunners and riflemen. After completely destroying this position, Pvt. Minue continued forward, routing enemy riflemen from dugout positions until he was fatally wounded. The courage, fearlessness and aggressiveness displayed by Pvt. Minue in the face of inevitable death was unquestionably the factor that gave his company the offensive spirit that was necessary for advancing and driving the enemy from the entire sector.

== Awards and decorations ==

Badge	Combat Infantryman Badge		
1st row	Medal of Honor		
2nd row	Bronze Star Medal	Purple Heart	Army Good Conduct Medal
2nd row	Navy Good Conduct Medal	World War I Victory Medal	American Defense Service Medal
3rd row	American Campaign Medal	European–African–Middle Eastern Campaign Medal with Arrowhead Device and 2 Campaign stars	World War II Victory Medal
Unit awards	Presidential Unit Citation		

== Personal honors ==
Some of Pvt. Minue's personal honors:

- In early 1956, the U.S. Army christened two new 172-foot, 860-ton, passenger and vehicle ferries which were named after two Medal of Honor recipients from the region, the Lt. Samuel S. Coursen and the Private Nicholas Minue. Both boats operated in New York Harbor between Manhattan and the US Army post and US Army headquarters at Fort Jay, Governors Island. Both boats continued in service when Governors Island became a U.S. Coast Guard base in 1966. In 1996, the Minue was declared excess as the Coast Guard closed the base. Sold to a maritime speculator, it is now in decrepit condition in dock in Staten Island New York. This ferryboat appeared in the TV murder mystery More Than Murder.
- Private Nicholas Minue Elementary School, Carteret, New Jersey.
- One of the main roads on Contingency Operating Base Speicher, in Tikrit, Iraq, was named in his honor.
- Minue Drive, East Fort Bliss, Texas.
- Minue Road, Fort Hood, Texas.
- Pvt. Nicholas Minue UAV Post 7, New York City, New York.
- Pvt. Nicholas Minue VFW Star Landing Post 2314, Carteret, New Jersey

== See also ==
- List of Medal of Honor recipients for World War II
