= North Africa American Cemetery and Memorial =

ABMC World War II cemetery

- American Battle Monuments Commission
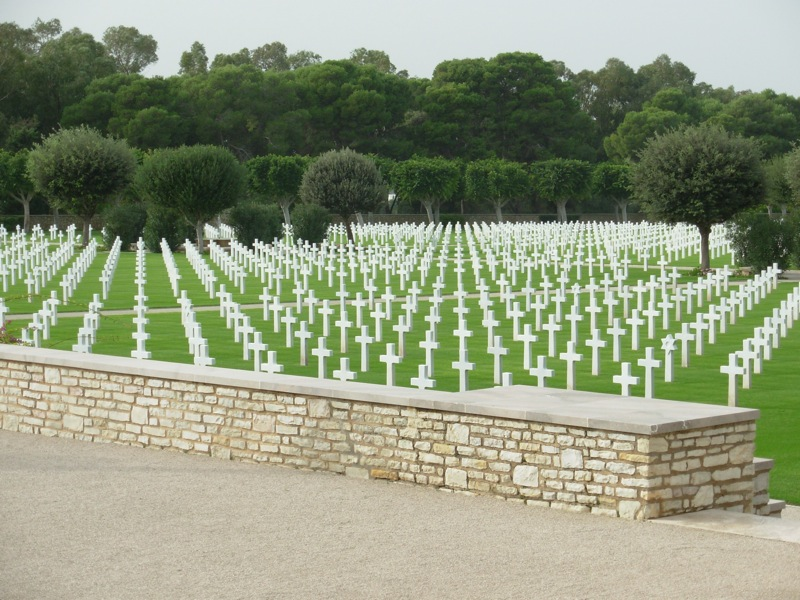
- Grave markers at the cemetery
- Used for those deceased 1943
- Location: 36°51′56″N 10°19′46″E near Carthage, Tunisia
- Total burials: 2,841

Burials by nation
- * United States: 2,841

Burials by war
- * World War II: 2,841

North Africa American Cemetery and Memorial is a Second World War military war grave cemetery, located in the town of Carthage in Tunisia. The cemetery, the only American one in North Africa and dedicated in 1960, contains 2,841 American war dead and covers 27 acres (11 ha). It is administered by the American Battle Monuments Commission.

== Description ==
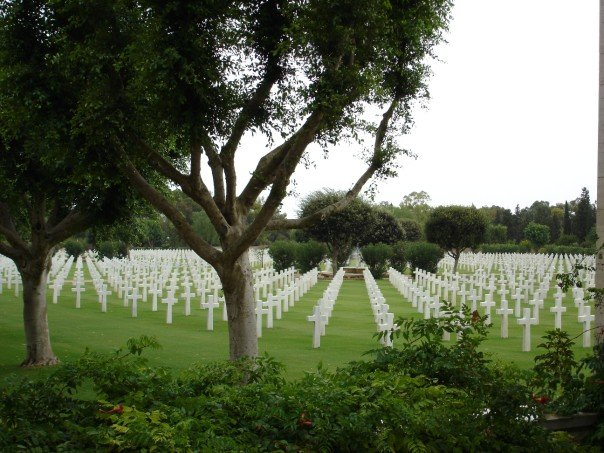
Cemetery view

Headstones are set in straight lines subdivided into nine rectangular plots by wide paths, with decorative pools at their intersections. Along the southeast edge of the burial area, bordering the tree-lined terrace leading to the memorial is the Wall of the Missing. On this wall 3,724 names are engraved. Rosettes mark the names of those since recovered and identified.

The chapel and the memorial court, which contains large maps in mosaic and ceramic depicting the operations and supply activities of American forces across Africa to the Persian Gulf, were designed to harmonize with local architecture. The chapel interior is decorated with polished marble, flags and sculpture.

== Location ==
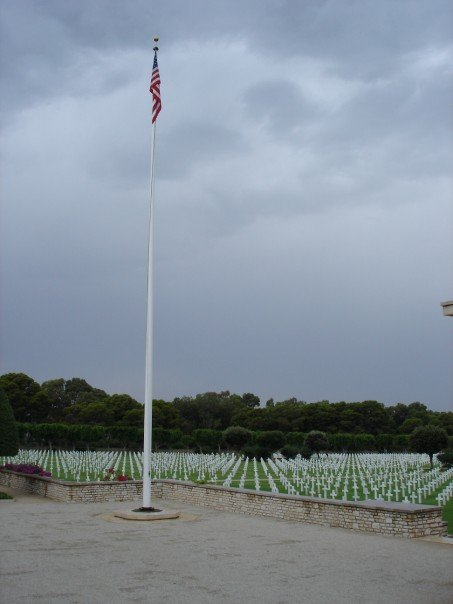
The flagpole and the cemetery

The North Africa American Cemetery is located close to the site of the ancient city of Carthage, Tunisia, destroyed by the Romans in 146 BCE, and lies over part of the site of Roman Carthage. It is near the present town of the same name, 10 miles (16 km) from the city of Tunis.

== Notable interments ==
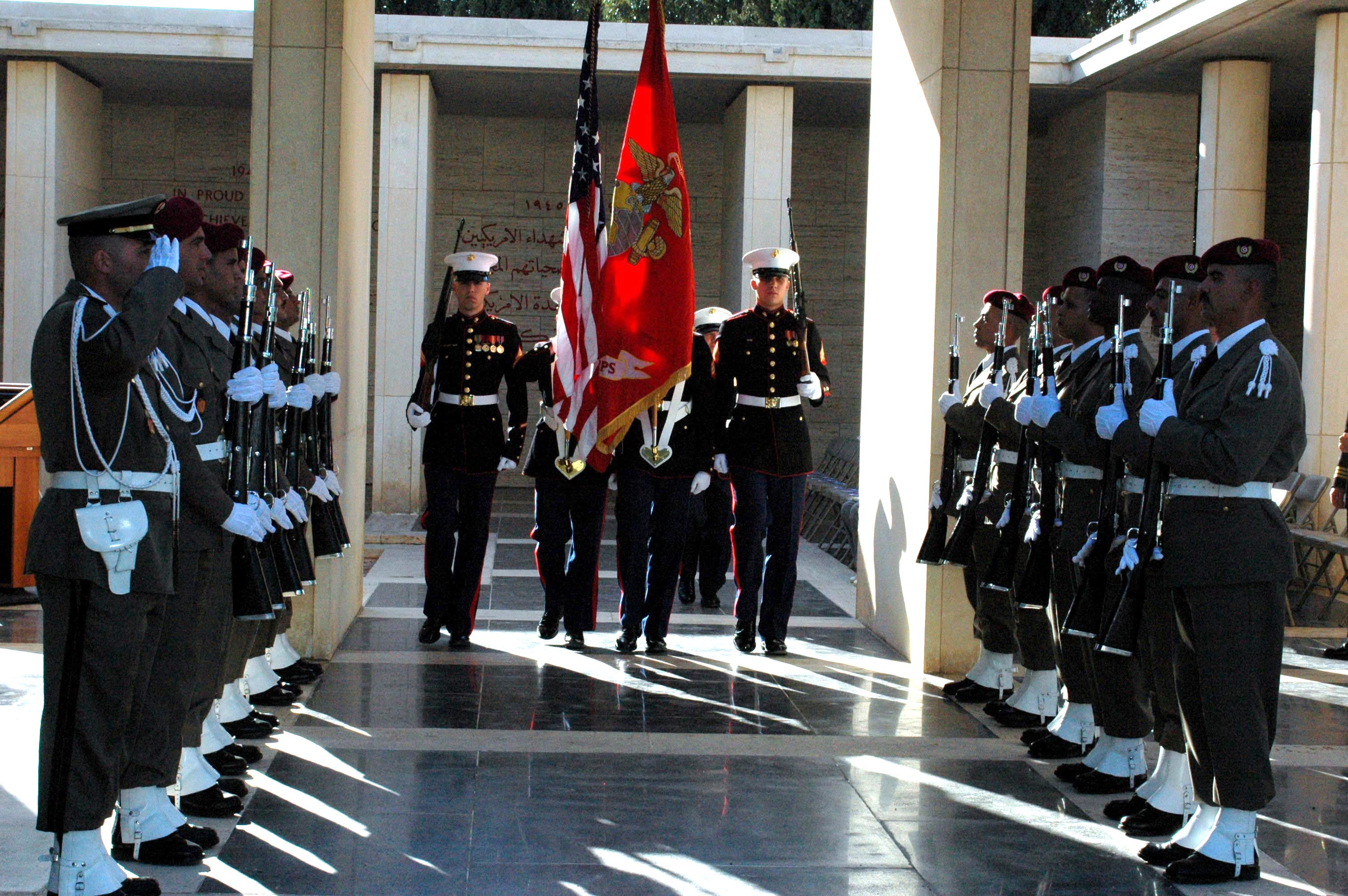
An American & Tunisian honor guard at the cemetery's chapel

- Captain Foy Draper (1911–1943), Gold Medal Olympic sprinter (1936 Olympics) and USAAF pilot
- Private Nicholas Minue (1905–1943), Medal of Honor recipient for his bravery near Majaz al Bab, Tunisia
- First Lieutenant Robert M. Emery (1911–1942), Distinguished Service Cross (posthumous) for his actions near Djebel Mrdajajdo in Algeria
