= Junior N. Van Noy (ship) =

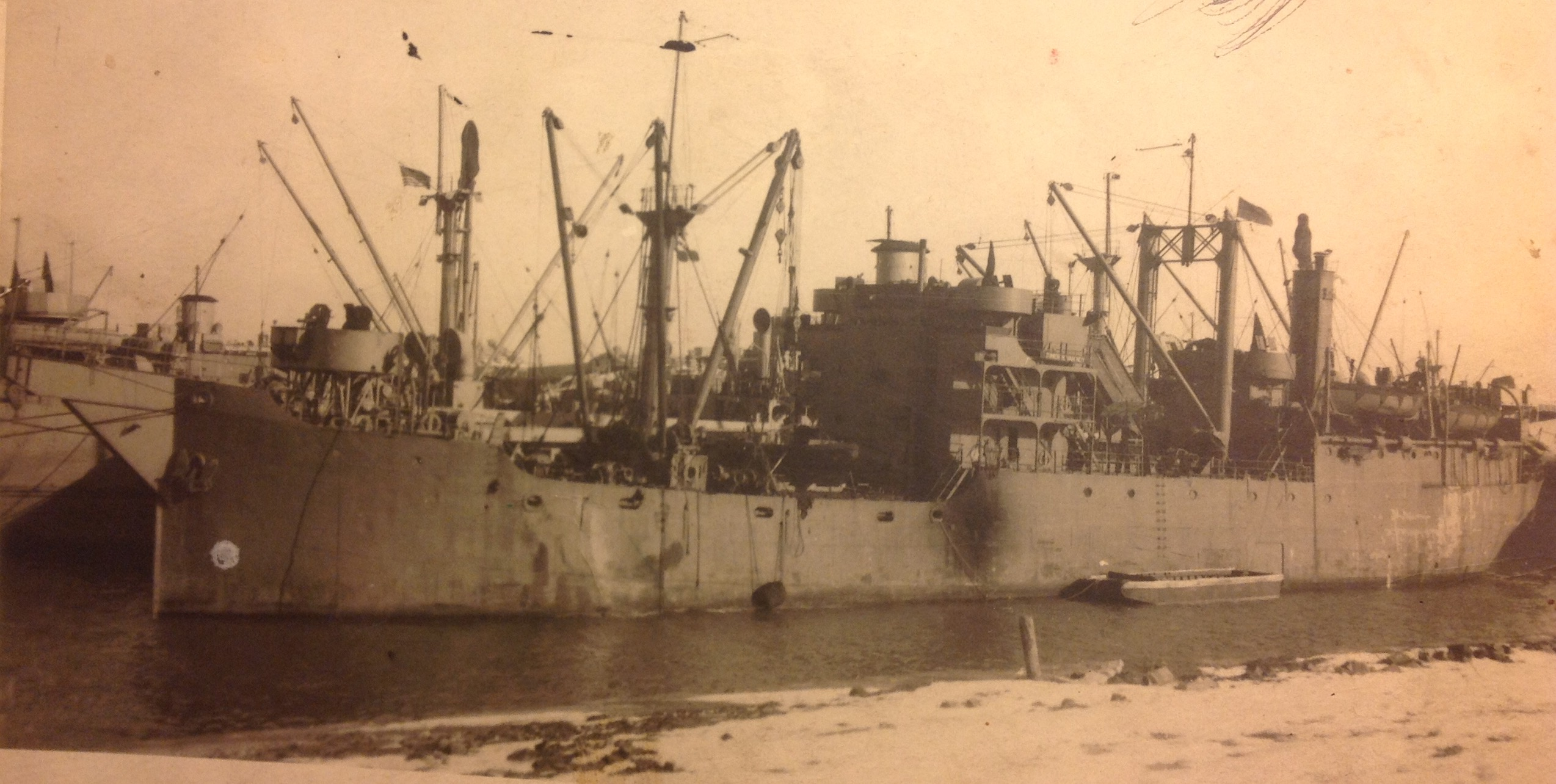

History
- Name: Covena (USSB 1919–1922, Hammond Lumber 1922–1937); Josephine Lawrence (Lawrence Phillips 1937–1941 & Pan Atlantic 1941–1942); Lawrence (Waterman 1942–1943); Junior Van Noy U.S. Army Corps of Engineers port repair ship (1944–1946); Northway U.S. Army, converted to barge 1946; Kathleen Sheridan Eastern Transportation Co.
- Port of registry: U.S.
- Ordered: Emergency Fleet Corporation (EFC) for U.S. Shipping Board
- Builder: Great Lakes Engineering Works, River Rouge Plant, Ecorse, Michigan
- Yard number: 220
- Launched: 1919
- Completed: 1919
- Identification: Official number 217810
- Fate: Sunk at dock at Arthur Kill, near Perth Amboy, N. J., in 1964.
- Notes: Converted to non self propelled barge 1946

General characteristics
- Tonnage: 2,450 GRT, 4,125 DWT
- Length: 253.5
- Beam: 43.5
- Draft: 25
- Propulsion: steam, triple expansion, reciprocating 1,350 HP
- Speed: 10 knots

Junior N. Van Noy was a Great Lakes steamer converted as one of ten U.S. U.S. Army Port Repair ships to be operated by the U.S. Army Corps of Engineers in rehabilitating war damaged ports. The other nine ships were Maritime Commission type N3–M–A1 cargo ship hulls built under U.S. Navy supervision and transferred upon completion or after very brief Navy service to the U.S. Army for conversion to port repair ships.

== Construction and commercial career ==
Covena, yard number 220, official number 217810, was completed in 1919 under United States Shipping Board Merchant Fleet Corporation (EFC) contract for seventeen ships, EFC Design 1060, Laker (a design referred to as "Stemwinders"), at Great Lakes Engineering Works, River Rouge Plant, Ecorse, Michigan. The design was for a bulk carrier with engines aft with dimensions of 253.5 X 43.5 X 25, triple expansion engines, oil or coal fired.

The ship remained with the United States Shipping Board during 1919-1922 and was then operated by Hammond Lumber 1922-1937 as Covena. Transfer to Lawrence Phillips brought a new name, Josephine Lawrence, for operations with that company 1937-1941 and then with Pan Atlantic 1941–1942. When transferred to Waterman the ship operated as the Lawrence from 1942 until allocation by the War Shipping Administration (WSA) to Army in 1943.

== U.S. Army Port Repair Ship ==
The Army acquired the ship through allocation by WSA and named it Junior N. Van Noy after Private Junior Van Noy, recipient posthumously of the Medal of Honor, killed in action 17 October 1943 in New Guinea. All port repair ships were named for Engineers killed in action. Private Van Noy was in an Engineer Boat and Shore Regiment.

=== Conversion ===
The Army had identified the Maritime Commission type N3–M–A1 cargo ship hulls as the candidates most suitable to meet the requirement for port repair ships. There was competition from both the U.S. Navy and the British for the diesel powered version, the N3-M-A1, of this design. The offer of the steam version, the N3-S-A1 was rejected by the Army. During the resulting disputes the Army obtained the Josephine Lawrence by allocation from the WSA.

The conversion of the Josephine Lawrence began 11 September 1943. The U.S. Army Transportation Corps (TC) had the lead in the conversion of the ships to Corps of Engineers specifications and then turned over to the Engineers for operations. The converted ship had been promised by TC for 15 January 1944 almost on the schedule required by the European command. Delays, shortages of materials, workers and intense competition from other requirements pushed that date even further into February and then 19 April 1944. On initial test operation the TC found the generators it had specified were insufficient and replacement was required. The Corps of Engineers crews had been trained ashore separately from the ships and thus had to join the ships to learn the practical details. The Junior N. Van Noy, the first of the port repair ships to be ready, sailed from Mobile, Alabama in late April with an Engineers crew sent from Fort Belvoir to Philadelphia for final preparation before deployment overseas. The crew was an organized, designated Corps of Engineers unit designated as an Engineer Port Repair Ship Crew.

The reference, "Preparing to Reconstruct Ports", notes:

The trip was a trying experience but perhaps more valuable in some ways than formal training. The soldiers quickly turned sea-men. Between Mobile and Key West the crew learned to spit to leeward and talk in terms of decks, bulkheads, and ladders. Morale was not so high, however, among the more experienced officers who knew ships and had to run this one.

Deficiencies in both ship and crew were worked in Philadelphia, Delaware River and Chesapeake Bay and the ship was the first of two to leave for the European Theater of Operations in July, 1944.

=== European Operations ===
Junior Van Noy sailed for the European Theater in late July 1944 from Halifax in Convoy number HXS300 arriving in August. The arrival of the ship is noted in The Corps of Engineers: The War Against Germany: CHAPTER XVI Developing Beaches and Reconstructing Ports:

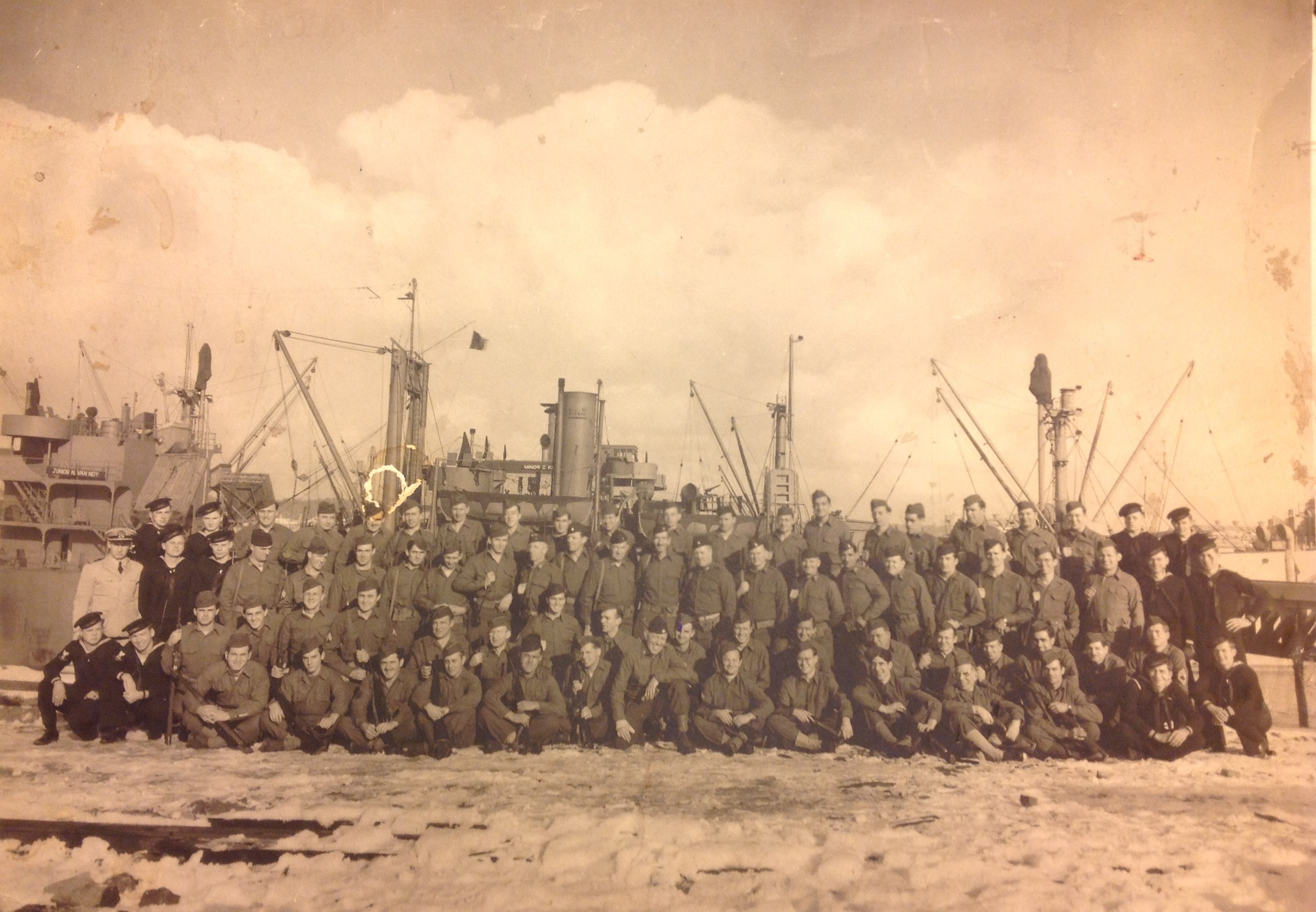
1071st Engineer Port Repair Ship Crew, with the Junior N. Van Noy in the background.

On 10 August the engineers working on the Cherbourg quays saw a new kind of ship steaming into the harbor. She was the Junior N. Van Noy, the first engineer port repair ship sent overseas. A converted Great Lakes steamer displacing only 3,000 tons, the ship had machine shops, storage bins, and heavy salvage equipment aboard. Her decks bristled with derricks and booms for lifting sunken ships and other debris. Manning the ship was the sixty-member 1071st Engineer Port Repair Ship Crew.

At Cherbourg the ship was first under control of the 1056th Engineer Port Construction and Repair Group then passed to the control of the 1055th Engineer Port Construction and Repair Group. The Junior N. Van Noy left Cherbourg 3 October 1944 bound for Le Havre with the 1055th Port Construction and Repair Group.

== Disposal ==
The ship was declared surplus and placed custody of the Maritime Commission 20 August 1947 for disposal, first in the reserve fleet at Brunswick, Georgia then in the James River in Virginia. On 1 July 1949 the ship, converted to a barge in 1946 and not self propelled, was sold to Eastern Transportation Company. Renamed Kathleen Sheridan the barge sank at the dock at Arthur Kill, Perth Amboy, New Jersey in 1964.
