= Penn-Jersey Shipbuilding Corp. =

US New Jersey shipbuilding company

- Founded: 1940
- Defunct: 1945
- Fate: Ceased operations
- Headquarters: Camden, New Jersey

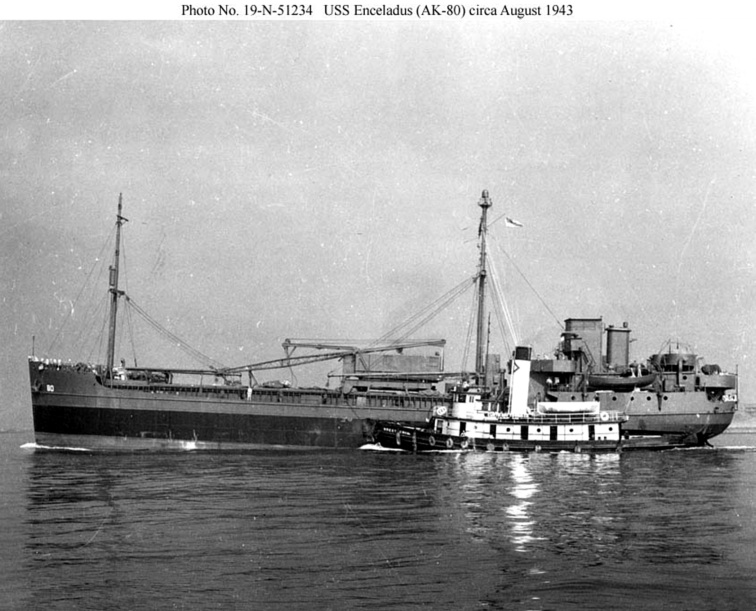
USS Enceladus (AK-80), built at Penn-Jersey Shipbuilding in August 1943 with original Navy configuration. Note Whirley crane that was part of the original N3-M-A1 design.

Penn-Jersey Shipbuilding Corp. of Camden, New Jersey was a shipyard opened in March 1940 to build ships for World War II under the Emergency Shipbuilding Program. The shipyard in the Port of Camden was on Cooper Point at north end of North 5th Street at 39.957309°N 75.117501°W. After building 29 vessels Penn-Jersey Shipbuilding Corp. closed in June 1945 after building its last vessels.

== Ships built ==
Penn-Jersey Shipbuilding Corp. built ships:

- Barracuda for Panama Canal Comm. a Patrol Launch
- Albacore for Panama Canal Comm. Patrol Launch
- Four US Coast Guard Patrol Launches
- General Construction barge
- USS Firm (AM-98) US Navy Minesweeper
- USS Force (AM 99) US Navy Minesweeper
  - Cargo ships 258 foot type N3-M-A1 for United States Maritime Commission:
- Elias D. Knight, became USS Enceladus (AK-80)
- William Lester
- Eben H. Linnell
- Asa Lothrop
- Laughlin McKay
- Oliver R. Mumford, became Media (AK-83)
- William Nott
- John L. Manson
- Nathaniel Matthews
- Josiah Paul, became Nashira (AK-85)
- Sumner Pierce, became Norma (AK-86)
- Moses Pike
- Symmes Potter, became Tucana (AK-88)
- Charles A. Ranlett
  - US Navy 173 foot Submarine chasers:
- PC 1221
- PC 1222, after war converted to a yacht the Gosse
- PC 1223
- PC 1224
  - For Western Maryland Railway two Car Float
- Car Float 21
- Car Float 22

== See also ==
- Wooden boats of World War II
- Bethlehem Elizabethport
- Bethlehem Brooklyn 56th Street
