= USS Hydra (AK-82) =

Cargo ship of the United States Navy

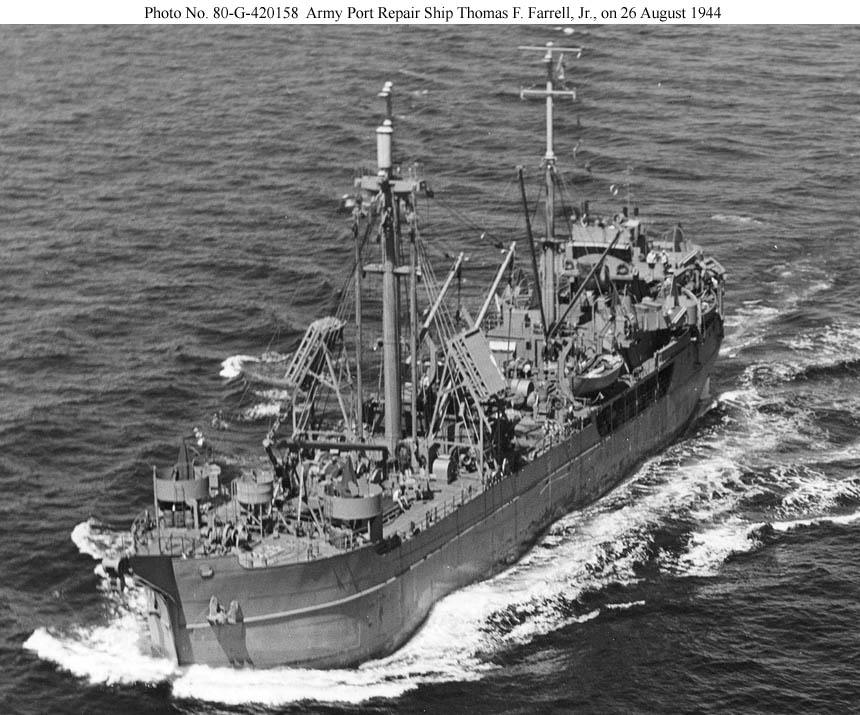
- Post conversion sister ship USAPRS Thomas F. Farrel, Jr. underway off the East Coast of the United States, 26 August 1944. US National Archives photo # 80-G-420158 RG-80-G, a US Navy photo now in the collections of the US National Archives.

History

United States
- Ordered: as N3-M-A1 hull, MC hull 465
- Builder: Penn-Jersey Ship Building Co.
- Laid down: as MV Eben H. Linnell
- Launched: 23 January 1943
- Acquired: 1 January 1943
- Commissioned: as USS Hydra (AK-82) 25 September 1943
- Decommissioned: 19 November 1943 transferred to Army same day
- Out of service: 20 August 1947
- Stricken: date unknown
- Fate: Scrapped

General characteristics
- Displacement: 1,677 t.(lt), 5,202 t.(fl)
- Length: 269 ft 10 in (82.25 m)
- Beam: 42 ft 6 in (12.95 m)
- Draught: 20 ft 9 in (6.32 m)
- Propulsion: Diesel, single shaft, 1,300shp
- Speed: 10 kts.
- Complement: 83
- Armament: one 3 in (76 mm) dual purpose gun mount

USS Hydra (AK-82), ex MV Eben H. Linnell, was an Enceladus-class cargo ship (Note: Only USS Enceladus (AK-80) of the ten-ship Enceladus-class, composed of Maritime Commission N3-M-A1 type small cargo vessels, saw significant naval service. The other nine, except USS Hydra (AK-82), were transferred within months or days of shipyard delivery from the Navy to the Army. Hydra was transferred to the Army shortly after commissioning and trials. The Navy had assumed administration of the contracts for these ships from the Maritime Commission on 1 January 1943 during or before construction so most were only administratively Navy, including names and numbers, during construction.) commissioned by the U.S. Navy for cargo service in World War II. Hydra was in naval service from 1 January through 19 November 1943 before she was transferred to the U.S. Army for conversion to the Engineer Port Repair ship Madison Jordan Manchester.

== Construction ==
Constructed as a Maritime Commission N3-M-A1 type, initially under Maritime Commission contract by Penn-Jersey Ship Building Co., Camden, New Jersey as MV Eben H. Linnell, with the contract being transferred to Navy during construction. The ship was acquired by the Navy 1 January 1943 before launch on 23 January 1943.

== Naval Service ==
The ship was converted for naval service at Bethlehem Steel, Key Highway, Baltimore, with completion on 27 May 1943. Hydra commissioned 25 September 1943, and arrived at Norfolk, Virginia, 1 October to prepare for her shakedown. For the next month she engaged in various operations, including speed trials and target runs in the Chesapeake Bay. She was loading cargo in Norfolk, Virginia upon transfer to the Army and departed in early November for Boston Harbor 5 November to begin the transfer process where she was decommissioned 19 November 1943 and transferred to the Army the same day.

== Army Service ==
Hydra was renamed by the Army as the Engineer Port Repair ship Madison Jordan Manchester after an Engineer officer killed in the war. Conversion began in the second week of December 1943 with delays plaguing the program and scheduled completion delayed until 31 March 1944. Crew training further delayed the ship. Sailing for the European Theater was not until 8 November 1944 from New York in Convoy HX 303.

== Fate ==
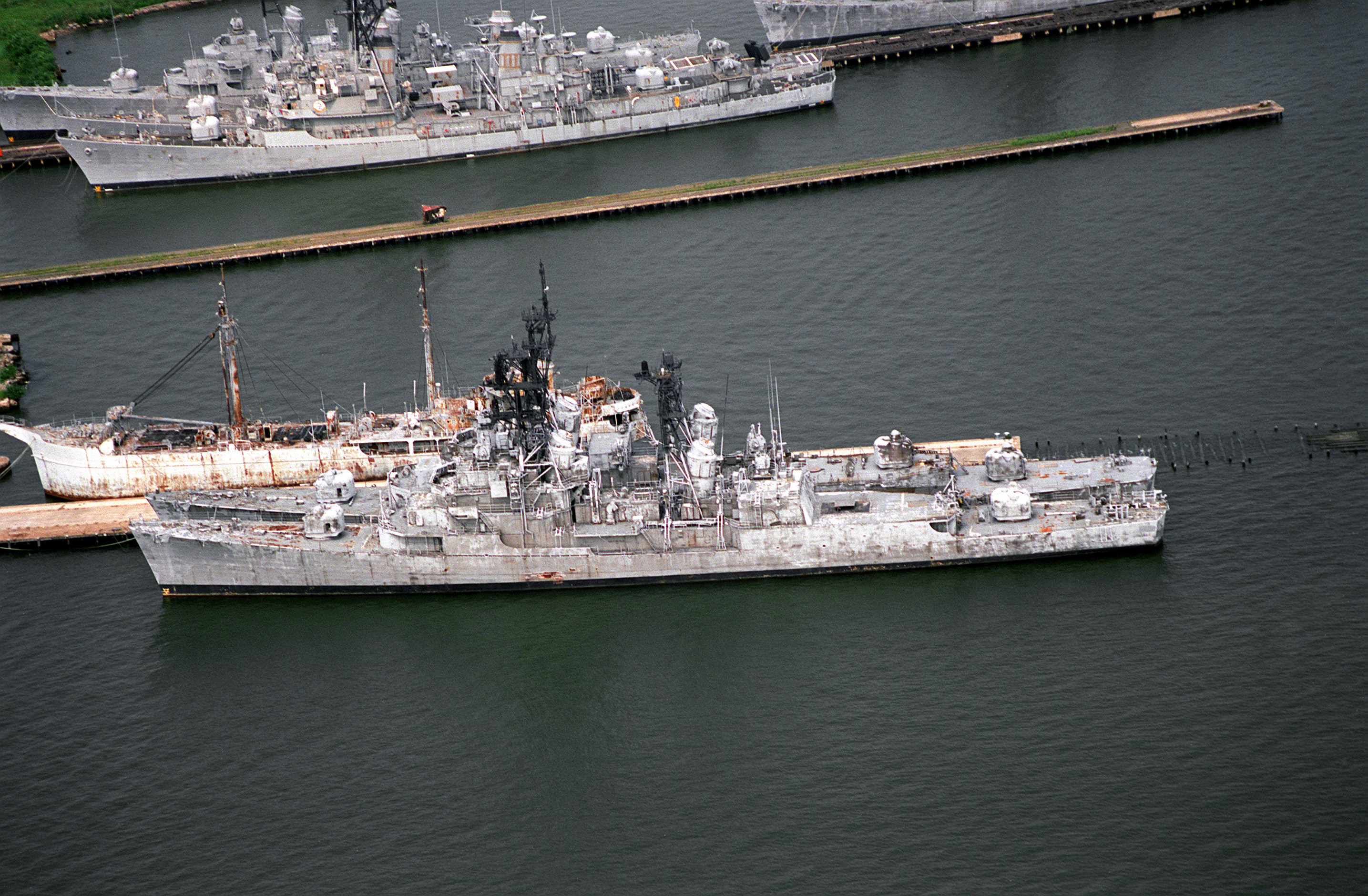
An aerial side view of two Forrest Sherman-class destroyers tied up at the Baltimore Fairfield Terminal awaiting scrapping. Inboard is the destroyer ex-USS Forrest Sherman (DD-931) and outboard is the ex-USS Blandy (DD-943). On the north side of the pier is the former U.S. Army N-3 type port repair ship Madison Jordan Manchester, also scheduled for scrapping.

The ship was returned to the Maritime Commission and arrived in the James River National Defense Reserve Fleet on 20 August 1947. There, the ship was put into use on 15 July 1985 as Fleet Service Craft (SS-27) to support maintenance of the fleet until disposal 24 May 1994. Madison Jordan Manchester was berthed at Fairfield Terminal at Baltimore, Maryland before scrapping there.
