= U.S. Army Engineer Port Repair ship =

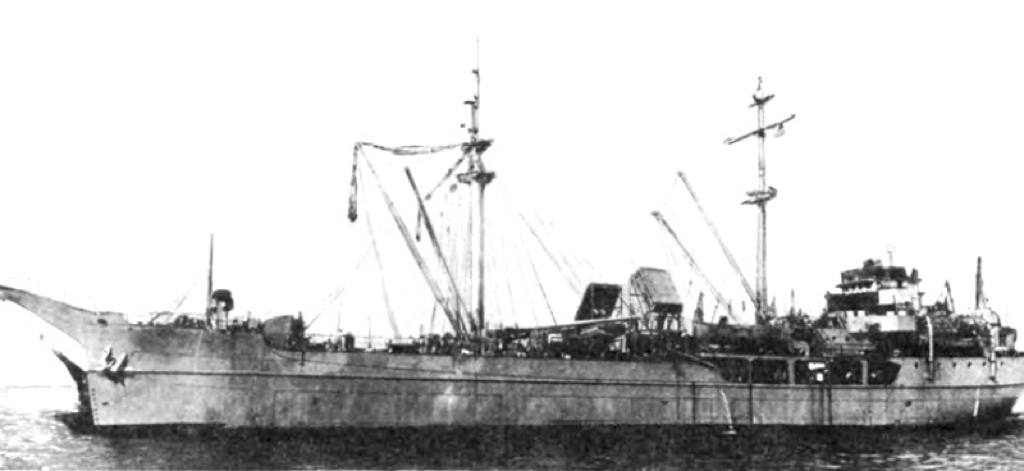
The Engineer Port Repair Ship. illustration from United States Army In World War II-The Technical Services, The Corps Of Engineers: Troops And Equipment; Center Of Military History, United States Army, Washington, D.C., 1988, page 405.

The U.S. Army acquired ten ships during World War II as Engineer Port Repair Ships, also sometimes known as Port Rehabilitation ships, for use by the U.S. Army Corps of Engineers to clear war damaged harbors. The need was anticipated by 1942 for the post invasion recovery of ports in Europe and the Transportation Corps was assigned the responsibility to acquire and modify the ships that would be military crewed under the Corps of Engineers.

== Requirement ==
The European Command had formed a request for port repair ships in 1942. Such a ship had never been required previously as ports were largely undamaged in World War I and had no peacetime technical or economic purpose. Experience in North Africa and particularly in Italy, where the port of Naples was almost completely destroyed and 350 to 400 vessels had been systematically sunk by the Germans, convinced the Allied command under Eisenhower that such vessels were a requirement.

Eisenhower had followed up an original request on 6 December 1942 after the North African experience with a requirement for five vessels of fourteen foot draft or less and about 275 feet in length. The U.S. Army Services of Supply assigned the task to the Transportation Corps (TC). After consideration the TC recommended a design that was originally a coastal transport and of which fourteen were being built under Navy contract. The Army wanted the diesel version, the Maritime Commission type N3-M-A1, while Navy wanted to give up the steam (N3-S-A1) version. At a meeting of the Navy's Munitions Assignments Committee the Army, Navy and Royal Navy all ruled the steam versions as unsuitable. Eventually a clear European requirement for five port repair ships manned by Army Engineers. After considerable dispute during which Navy proposed N3-M-A1 vessels being built for the British, the British objected and the matter was taken to the Combined Chiefs of Staff vessels were obtained and conversions begun.

== Design ==
The ships were all modifications of cargo type vessels that were under construction or just launched. The conversions were to specialized vessels with the machine shops, diver support and heavy lift capacity to clear harbors of wreckage. A distinctive feature of the ships after conversion was the forty ton lift bow horn. They were slightly larger and similar in function and ultimate appearance to the Navy's Salvage Lifting Vessel (ARSD).

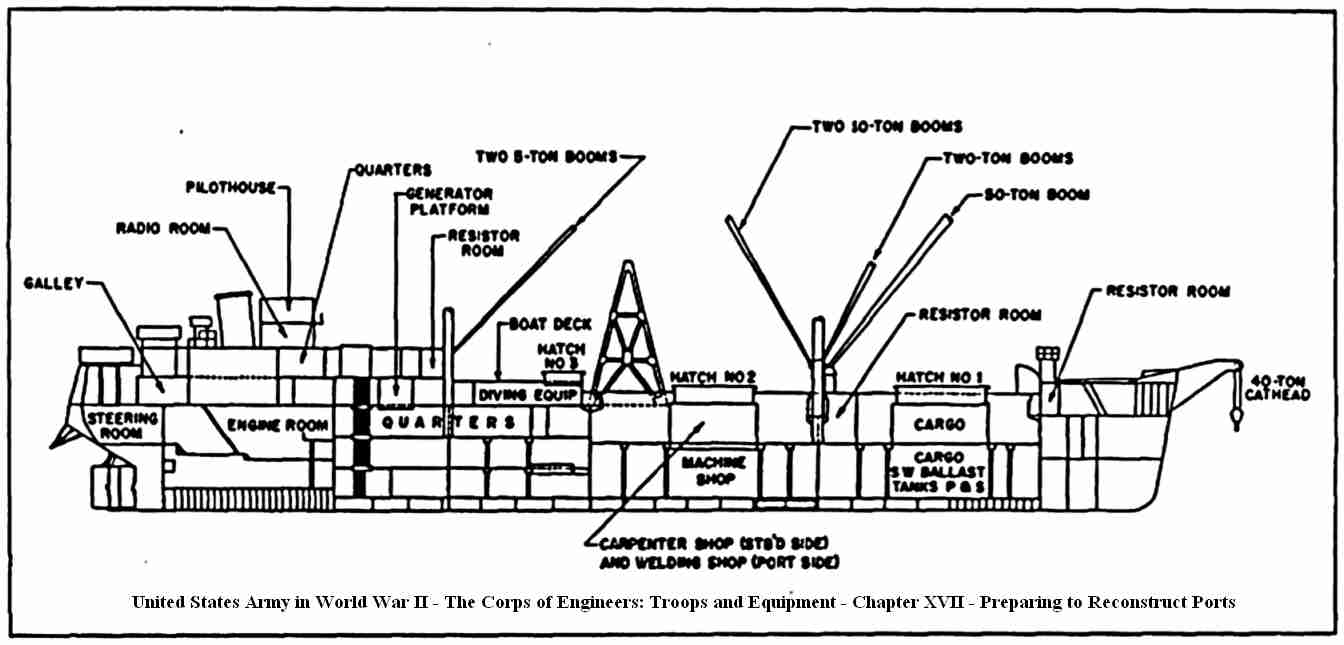
Engineer Port Repair Ship Diagram from United States Army in World War II - The Corps of Engineers: Troops and Equipment - Chapter XVII - Preparing to Reconstruct Ports

== Ships ==
All of the ten ships were cargo type conversions. The N3-M-A1 vessels were diesel powered ships of a coastal cargo design more commonly steam powered. Fourteen of these diesel powered versions of the Maritime Commission N3-S-A1 steam vessels were being built at Penn-Jersey Shipbuilding for the U.S. Navy or Lend Lease under contracts assumed by the Navy from the Maritime Commission effective 1 January 1943. Four hulls had been assigned to the British and five had been allocated to the Navy at the time of the Army's requirement. Ultimately the Army was allocated nine of the ten hulls originally allocated to Navy. The one exception was the ship already in Navy hands, the USS Enceladus (AK-80), that gave its name to a class of following vessels that were Navy only for administrative purposes during construction except for the USS Hydra (AK-82) that was transferred to Army after trials and before actual deployment. These are the remains of the Enceladus class that were in general transferred to Army a matter of weeks or even the day they were delivered to the Navy. Unfavorable experience with the Enceladus was involved in Navy's willingness to give up the rest of the hulls despite a critical need for small, shallow draft naval cargo vessels. None of the nine saw significant naval service before conversion. Some were converted from hulls without superstructure. One vessel was a World War I vintage cargo ship allocated to Army by the War Shipping Administration (WSA).

=== Maritime Commission type N3-M-A1 ===
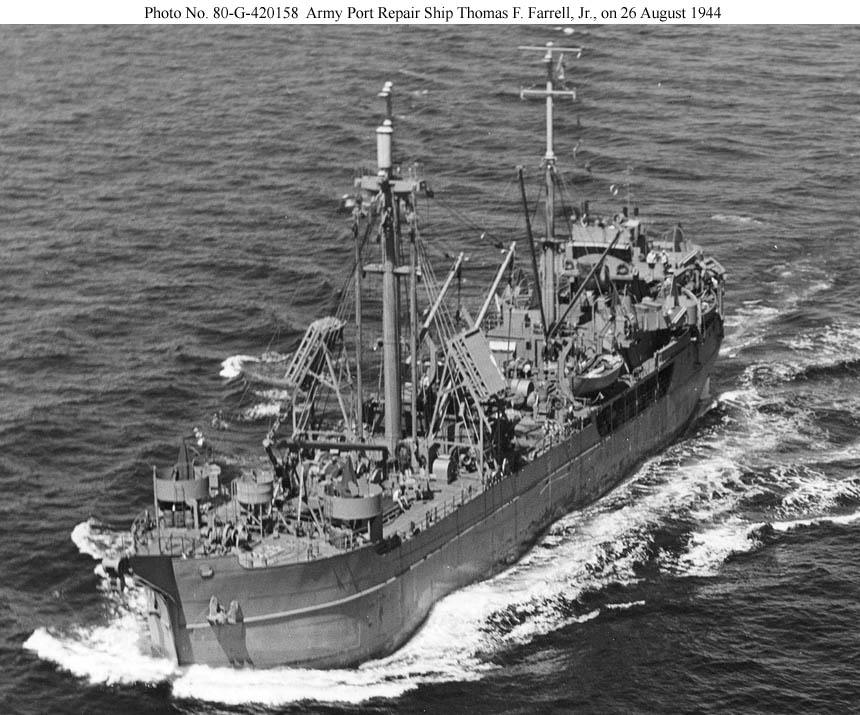
USAPRS Thomas F. Farrel, Jr. underway off the East Coast of the United States, 26 August 1944. US National Archives photo # 80-G-420158 RG-80-G, a US Navy photo now in the collections of the US National Archives.

Nine of the ten ships were Maritime Commission type N3-M-A1 cargo vessel hulls of 2,483 gross tons with a length of 291 feet by beam of 42 feet. Number one and two holds were fifty-six feet long with number three being twenty-eight feet in length. The conversion placed machine, welding and carpenter shops in number two hold along with generators and air compressors supporting engineering work. Number one hold was reserved for construction machinery with number three containing repair stock, portable generators, refrigerated stores and quarters. The ships carried portable salvage equipment, including diver support, five ton capacity crawler crane, other lifting equipment and a pontoon barge. The most notable feature was addition of a forty ton cathead derrick for heavy salvage.

- Arthur C. Ely ex Tucana (AK-88) ex MV Symmes Potter
- Glenn Gerald Griswold ex Media (AK-83) ex MV Oliver R. Mumford
- Henry Wright Hurley ex Norma (AK-86) ex MV Sumner Pierce
- Joe C. Specker ex Vela (AK-89) ex MV Charles A. Ranlett
- Madison Jordan Manchester ex USS Hydra (AK-82) ex MV Eben H. Linnell
- Marvin Lyle Thomas ex MV Moses Pike later USNS Sagitta (T-AK-87)
- Richard R. Arnold ex Nashira (AK-85) ex MV Josiah Paul
- Robert M. Emery ex Mira (AK-84) ex MV William Nott
- Thomas F. Farrel Jr. ex Europa (AT-81) ex MV William Lester

=== WSA allocated ===
The other ship was the World War I vessel SS Josephine Lawrence (ex Covena) built by Great Lakes Engineering Works and allocated to Army by the WSA.

- Junior N. Van Noy (ex Lawrence, ex Josephine Lawrence, ex Covena) a 3,000 ton, 277 feet long vessel with a beam of 43 feet and speed of 10 knots and the first of these ships to arrive overseas.

== Crews ==
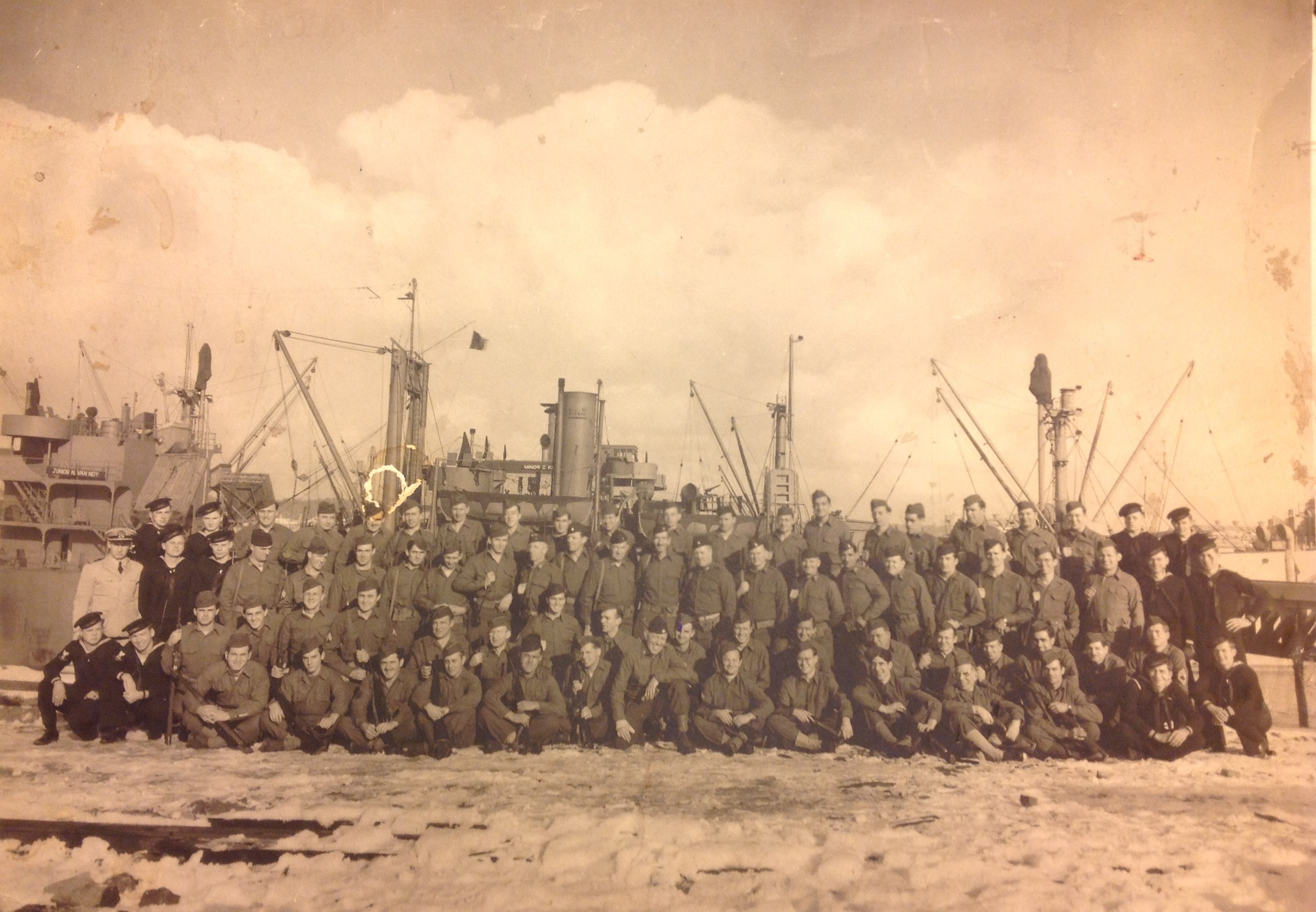
1071st Engineer Port Repair Ship Crew, with the Junior N. Van Noy in the background.

The ships were crewed by Combat Engineers organized into formal Army units, the Engineer Port Repair Ship Crew. The first crew to arrive in the European Theater of Operations aboard the Junior N. Van Noy was the 1071st Engineer Port Repair Ship Crew.

=== Organization ===
The Engineer Field Manual (FM-5-5) states:

f. The engineer port repair ship is divided into a headquarters section and an operating section. It maintains channel markings and other aids for pilots, and removes obstructions from channels or ship berths.

Section VI of FM-5-5 provides evidence the ship was organized as an Army Engineering unit with seamanship training differing in organization from a typical naval or commercial ship. A superseded organization chart found on page 23 of the manual shows an organization of Headquarters, Deck, Engine and Operating sections a bit more typical of a ships organization.

=== Early training difficulties ===
Though the ships were to be managed, operated and crewed by the Corps of Engineers (COE) the Transportation Corps (TC) had primary responsibility for obtaining, managing the shipyard modifications to COE and TC specifications and in initial crew training. The crews assembled on the West Coast in August 1943 under TC jurisdiction where they were put into training in nautical and technical fields. The COE was concerned about the qualifications and training thus establishing two investigative boards in San Francisco and Seattle composed of U.S. Coast Guard, COE and TC personnel to interview each candidate destined for ship deck or engine room operations on knowledge of navigation and seamanship. The results were less than desirable:

The board at San Francisco reported on 4 October that none of the three crews at that port could be trusted with a ship. In fact, there were not enough capable men in all three units to make one qualified crew.

As a result all crews were to be brought to the East Coast and complete training under the jurisdiction of the Chief of Engineers with critical positions filled with personnel from civilian life with shipboard experience. The crews were assembled in late November at Fort Belvoir in Virginia. The candidate specialists were then given specific training in schools on the East Coast with divers training on the salvage of the Normandie in New York.

For a number of reasons the delivery of the converted ships was delayed and the crews could not combine training with actual shipboard experience. This was to cause difficulties until actual sailing for operations.

== Operations ==
Only five of the ten ships, the Junior N. Van Noy, Madison Jordan Manchester, Glenn Gerald Griswold, Thomas F. Farrel and Robert M. Emery made it to Europe in time for significant work. The remaining ships were not operational until 1945. Some of the modifications turned out not to be as useful as anticipated. The distinctive forty ton capacity bow horn in particular was seldom used. Navy salvage units had been operational earlier for heavy lift and the most valuable function of the ships may have been to centralize support, heavy maintenance and facilities for Army Engineers conducting repairs.
