= USS Enceladus =

Cargo ship of the United States Navy

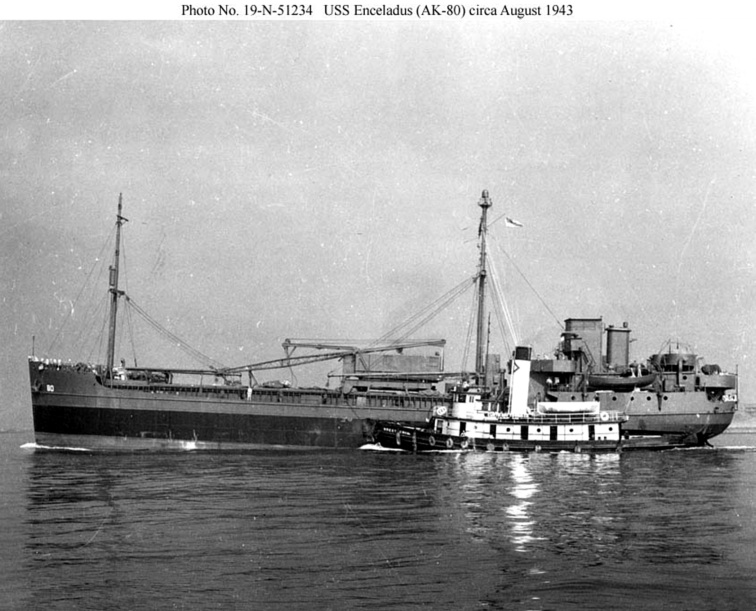
- USS Enceladus (AK-80), August 1943 in original Navy configuration. Note Whirley crane that was part of the original N3-M-A1 design. (Navy Photo No. 19-N-51234 in U.S. National Archives, RG-19-LCM.)

History

United States
- Name: USS Enceladus (AK-80)
- Ordered: as N3-M-A1 hull, MC hull 463
- Builder: Penn-Jersey Shipbuilding Corp.
- Laid down: 14 February 1942, as SS Elias D. Knight
- Launched: 9 October 1942
- Acquired: 18 August 1943
- Commissioned: 18 August 1943
- Decommissioned: 18 December 1945
- Stricken: date unknown
- Fate: Sold in 1964 for non-transportation use

General characteristics
- Displacement: 1,677 t.(lt), 5,202 t.(fl)
- Length: 269 ft 10 in (82.25 m)
- Beam: 42 ft 6 in (12.95 m)
- Draught: 20 ft 9 in (6.32 m)
- Propulsion: Diesel, single shaft, 1,300 shp
- Speed: 10 kn (19 km/h; 12 mph)
- Complement: 83
- Armament: one 3 in (76 mm) dual purpose gun mount

USS Enceladus (AK-80) (launched 1942) was an Enceladus-class cargo ship (Note: Only USS Enceladus (AK-80) of the ten-ship Enceladus-class, composed of Maritime Commission N3-M-A1 type small cargo vessels, saw significant naval service. The other nine, except USS Hydra (AK-82), were transferred within months or days of shipyard delivery from the Navy to the Army. Hydra was transferred to the Army shortly after commissioning and trials. The Navy had assumed administration of the contracts for these ships from the Maritime Commission on 1 January 1943 during or before construction so most were only administratively Navy, including names and numbers, during construction.) commissioned by the U.S. Navy for service in World War II. She was responsible for delivering goods and equipment to locations in the war zone.

Enceladus was built by the Penn Jersey Shipbuilding Co., Camden, New Jersey, in 1942, acquired and commissioned by the Navy on 18 August 1943.

== World War II Pacific Ocean operations ==
During World War II Enceladus operated entirely in the southwest Pacific Ocean, crewed by the U.S. Coast Guard. She shuttled supplies between supply bases which included Noumea, New Caledonia, Tongatapu, Torokina, Bougainville, Emirau, and Guadalcanal. She was occupied with inter-island freight traffic until 4 August 1945 when she arrived at Pearl Harbor. Enceladus was decommissioned on 18 December 1945 and turned over to the Maritime Commission.

== Military awards and honors ==
Enceladus’ crew was eligible for the following medals:

- American Campaign Medal
- Asiatic-Pacific Campaign Medal
- World War II Victory Medal
