= Metomkin =

Metomkin or Metompkin may refer to:

- Metompkin Island, a barrier island off Virginia, United States
- Metompkin, Virginia, a place in the United States
- USS Metomkin, the name of more than one United States Navy ship
