= Alhena (disambiguation) =

Alhena may refer to:

- Alhena (star), the third-brightest object in the constellation of Gemini, also known as Gamma Geminorum
- USS Alhena - an attack cargo ship built in 1941
- Alhena (AKL-38) - a ship built for the United States Army as FS-257 in 1944
