= USS Metomkin =

USS Metomkin has been the name of more than one United States Navy ship, and may refer to:

- USS Metomkin (AVP-47), a seaplane tender that was cancelled in 1943 before construction could begin
- USS Metomkin (AG-136), a cargo ship in commission from 1947 to 1951

== See also ==
- Metompkin Island
