= Alhena (AKL-38) =

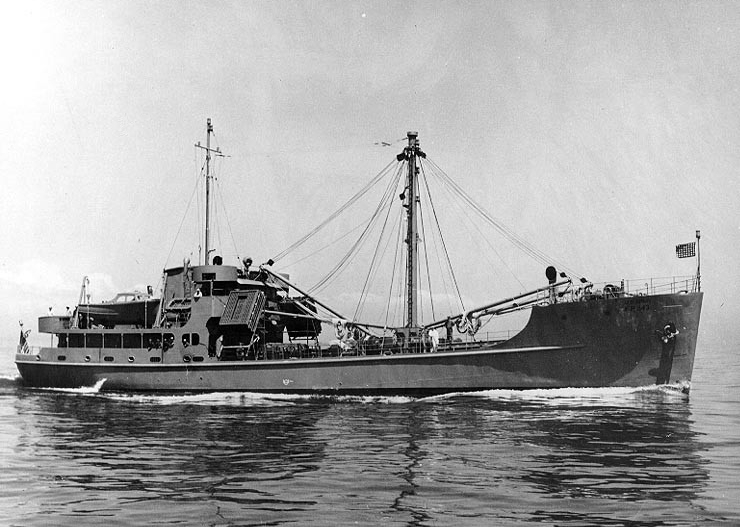
- Similar ship, a Design 381 (Vessel, Supply, Diesel, Steel, 177') FP-343 (FP later designated FS) photographed in 1944. Naval Historical and Heritage Command: Photo #: NH 74691

History

United States
- Name: FS-257 (1944 — 1951); Alhena (Nominal U.S.N. name for loan); Unknown (ROK) (1951 — 1960)
- Namesake: Alhena, the third brightest object in Gemini.
- Builder: Wheeler Shipbuilding, Whitestone, New York (Note: Conflicting information. U.S. Army Ships and Watercraft of World War II (Grover, David; Naval Institute Press, 1987) and Shipbuilding History, show the ship in a block built by Wheeler Shipbuilding, Brooklyn, New York. NavSource has Kewaunee Shipbuilding and Engineering Corp., Kewaunee, WI.)
- Yard number: 71
- Laid down: 1944
- Commissioned: 24 June 1944 (USCG crewed/Army ship)
- Decommissioned: 12 December 1951 (transfer to Navy)
- In service: 1944
- Out of service: 1960
- Stricken: 1 February 1960
- Fate: Sold for scrap, June 1960

General characteristics
- Displacement: 550 tons
- Length: 177 ft (54 m)
- Beam: 33 ft (10 m)
- Draft: 10 ft (3.0 m)
- Propulsion: 2 × 500 hp (370 kW) GM Cleveland Division 6-278A 6-cyl V6 diesel engines, twin screws
- Speed: 12 knots (22 km/h; 14 mph)
- Complement: 42

Alhena (AKL-38) was a Design 381 (Vessel, Supply, Diesel, Steel, 177') built for the United States Army as FS-257. The Army vessel was U.S. Coast Guard crewed, serving in the Southwest Pacific during World War II.

The ship was acquired by the United States Navy 12 December 1951, named Alhena and loaned to the Republic of Korea the same day. She was the second ship of the United States Navy to bear the name but had no U.S. Navy service under the name. The ship was returned from loan January 1960, struck the next month and sold for scrap in June 1960.

== Ship history ==
=== U.S. Army (1944–1951) ===
FS-257 was laid down in 1944 by Wheeler Shipbuilding, Whitestone, New York, yard number 71, for delivery to the United States Army. On 24 June 1944 the U.S. Coast Guard manned freighter was commissioned at New York with Lt. G. P. Hammond, USCG as commanding officer. On 26 June FS-257 departed for the Southwest Pacific operating there through the landings at Leyte. In July 1945 the ship ran aground in the general vicinity of Maripipi island and was assisted off the beach by FS-406. (Note: FS-406, already damaged by a typhoon on 11 September 1945, was further damaged by a typhoon at Okinawa on 16 September. Anchored at Naha the even further damaged ship endured a second Okinawa typhoon 9 October and was damaged to the point the ship was given up as lost. See 1945 Pacific typhoon season.)

=== U.S. Navy/Republic of Korea service (1951–1960) ===
On 12 December 1951, during the Korean War, FS-257 was acquired by the United States Navy, named Alhena, after the third-brightest star in the constellation Gemini, and on the same day loaned to Republic of Korea for service with the Republic of Korea Navy. She left Korean naval service in January 1960, and was returned to U.S. custody shortly thereafter. On 1 February 1960, she was struck from the Naval Register.

=== Fate ===
She was sold for scrap to Hong Kong Rolling Mills, Ltd. in June 1960. The ship is listed among a registry of naval vessels that contained asbestos in her construction.

== See also ==
- FS-255
- USS Camano (AG-130) (FS-256)
