= USNS New Bedford =

Cargo ship of the United States Navy

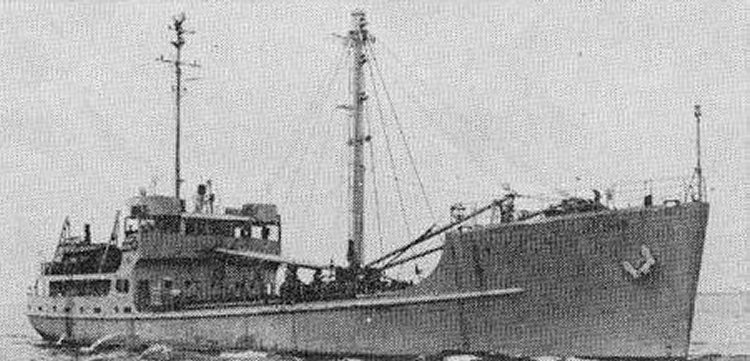
- New Bedford at anchor, c. 1944-current, location Ballard Shipyards

History

United States
- Name: USNS New Bedford
- Namesake: New Bedford, Massachusetts
- Builder: Wheeler Shipbuilding Company
- Laid down: as FS-289 for the U.S. Army (1944)
- Launched: 1945
- Completed: 1945
- Acquired: by the U.S. Navy, July 1, 1950
- Commissioned: July 1, 1950 as USNS New Bedford (IX-308)
- Decommissioned: October 28, 1994
- In service: 1945
- Out of service: 28 October 1994
- Reclassified: AKL-17, June 1950
- Refit: IX-308, USNS New Bedford in 1963
- Stricken: April 4, 1995
- Identification: IMO number: 8644981; MMSI number: 338316000; Callsign: WDF7519
- Fate: Sold, 1996
- Status: Active as fishing vessel

General characteristics
- Class & type: Camano-class cargo ship
- Type: Light Cargo Ship
- Tonnage: 620 tons
- Displacement: 414 tons(lt); 940 tons(fl)
- Length: 177 ft
- Beam: 32 ft
- Draft: 10 ft
- Propulsion: Two 500 hp GM Cleveland Division 6-278A 6-cyl V6 diesel engines, twin screws
- Speed: 12 knots
- Complement: 26 officers and enlisted

USNS New Bedford (FS-289/AKL-17) was a Navy owned Military Sea Transportation Service civilian crewed Camano-class cargo ship originally constructed for the U.S. Army as the coastal freighter FS-289 shortly before the end of World War II.

== U.S. Army ==
Built as the U.S. Army U.S. Army Freight and Supply Ship FS-289 at Wheeler Shipbuilding, Whitestone New York in 1944 she served with a U.S. Coast Guard crew operating in Hawaii during the remainder of the war.

== U.S. Navy ==
Acquired and converted to a Camano-class cargo ship by the US Navy on 1 July 1950 and was placed in service as USNS New Bedford (AKL-17).

New Bedford's shakedown cruise initially took her across the central Pacific Ocean to Midway Islands, Guam and Saipan. Attached to the Service Force, Pacific Fleet, New Bedford carried supplies between Navy bases throughout the central Pacific. The New Bedford is also the sister ship of the ill-fated USS Pueblo, which was captured by the North Koreans in 1968 and whose crew was imprisoned for 11 months.

The ship then served out of the port of New Bedford, Massachusetts servicing the U.S. Air Force Texas Towers with equipment, food, petroleum, oils, and lubricant and other required supplies. The tower's personnel were required to serve one full 365 day tour on the tower during a two-year duty tour but were allowed breaks at Otis Air Force Base on Cape Cod. New Bedford thus carried up to 21 passengers during the supply runs. Cargo capacity was 24 Conex containers, 9 tons of refrigerated cargo, 3,925 cu ft (111.1 m^{3}) of dry cargo below decks, 60,000 US gallons (230,000 L) fuel oil and 16,000 US gallons (61,000 L) of fresh water.

A normal supply trip averaged forty hours but varied on weather conditions, particularly at the tower where approach had to be in conditions allowing closing the tower without collision. Circular currents of from 038 kn (44 mph; 70 km/h) to 1.9 kn (2.2 mph; 3.5 km/h) in the tower's vicinity complicated any approach in order to moor to the tower with two nylon lines and connect hoses to transfer water, fuel for the tower and aviation gas for the tower's helicopter. Cargo and passengers were taken aboard the tower, with its deck 61 ft (18.6 m) feet above the water, by donut sling or cargo nets by the tower's crane. The Air Force nicknamed the ship "Old Faithful."

On 14 January 1961 the ship delivered supplies and stood by the ill-fated Texas Tower 4 as the tower awaited orders to abandon. The order came from the Air Force at four in the afternoon of the 15th and the tower was ready to be abandoned at seven. New Bedford, struggling in the storm herself trying to reach the tower, last heard from the tower at seven-ten with an estimate from the tower's commander that they could hold out until daylight. It was the last message from the tower which was lost with all 28 hands at 7:20pm on January 15, 1961.

The ship was placed out of service in 1963 and then was reclassified Miscellaneous Unclassified, (IX-308) where it was deployed to the Naval Undersea Warfare Center, Keyport, Washington for torpedo testing duty and assigned service-craft status. The (IX-308) served as a Torpedo Test Firing Vessel and during this assignment she steamed over 310,000 nautical miles. She was equipped with both surface and underwater launchers and associated fire control equipment. She supported proofing, acceptance testing and research work on Keyport's ranges since that time.

During these past 31 years, the New Bedford has: 1) fired over 7200 units (torpedoes, targets, etc.); 2) recovered more than 900 units; 3) planted more than 5425 range buoys; 4) retrieved over 4650 range buoys; 5) made server port calls to Vancouver and Nanaimo, British Columbia and two trips to San Diego.

== Inactivation and sale ==
The IX-308's out-of-service ceremony on October 28, 1994, incorporated elements of the vessel's presumed history. The torpedo station people had come to the assumption that this ship, not her sister ship the Hewell, was used in the movie Mr. Roberts. The proceedings were highlighted by audio clips taken directly from the film. Those present heard memorable film quotes just as they had been spoken by the actors in the film so many years ago.

The ceremony was not limited to the ship's film history, but also touched on its long military career. The Mayor of the City of New Bedford, Massachusetts, the Honorable Rosemary Tierney, was in attendance along with retired Navy Captain Frederick R. Purrington.

The out of service ceremony commenced flawlessly, but did not end without one final act of good humor. Code 80's Steve Schultz appeared as Ensign Pulver at the end of the proceedings. He sprinted down the bow of the vessel with a palm tree. Schultz, or rather Pulver, launched the unsuspecting palm over the pier in one final act of defiance as well as in celebration and honor of the New Bedford IX-308.

In total, the USNS New Bedford served for nearly five decades in the Army and Navy. October 28, 1994 finally saw the flag lowered on the vessel, thus ending its military career.

The New Bedford was struck from the Naval Register on 4 April 1995 and was sold by the Defense Reutilization and Marketing Service, for commercial service on 11 June 1996. It was renamed F/V Sea Bird and initially operated as a tuna longliner out of San Diego, California. As of July 2023 it was owned by E&E Foods out of Seattle, WA as F/V Seabird and operated in the Alaskan salmon fishery.

== Awards ==
- Asiatic-Pacific Campaign Medal
- World War II Victory Medal
- National Defense Service Medal with two stars
