= USS Estero (AG-134) =

Cargo ship of the United States Navy

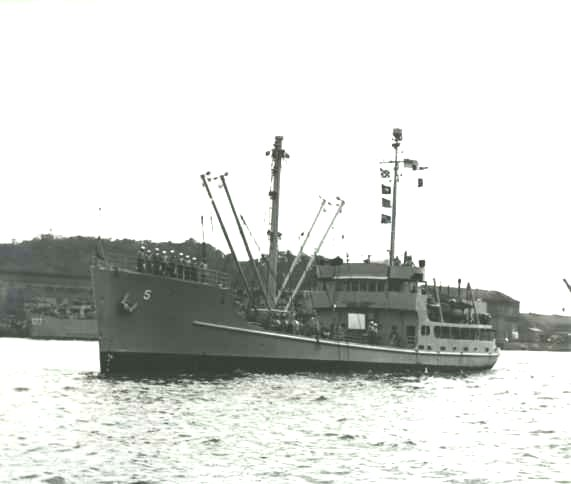
- Estero (AKL-5), underway at Sasebo, Japan, 23 October 1953

History

United States
- Name: USS Estero
- Namesake: Estero Island in Florida
- Acquired: March 1947
- Commissioned: 5 July 1947, as AG-134 (Miscellaneous Auxiliary)
- Decommissioned: 22 January 1960
- Reclassified: AKL-5 (Light Cargo Ship), 31 March 1949
- Stricken: 1 February 1960
- Honours and awards: 7 battle stars (Korea)
- Fate: Sold commercial 1946, scrapped September 1994

General characteristics
- Type: Camano-class cargo ship
- Displacement: 500 long tons (508 t)
- Length: 177 ft (53.9 m)
- Beam: 33 ft (10.1 m)
- Draft: 10 ft (3.0 m)
- Propulsion: 2 × General Motors 6-278A V6 diesel engines, 500 hp (373 kW) each, 2 screws
- Speed: 12 knots (22 km/h; 14 mph)
- Complement: 26
- Armament: None

USS Estero (AG-134/AKL-5) was a Camano-class cargo ship in the United States Navy. She was named after Estero Island off the coast of Florida.

Estero, which originally served with the U.S. Army as USA FS-275, was acquired by the U.S. Navy in March 1947 and commissioned on 5 July.

== Pacific Ocean operations ==
She was employed in logistics support of the administration of the United Nations Trust Territories, calling throughout the Marshalls, Carolines, and Marianas. On 31 March 1949, she was reclassified AKL-5.

== Korean War service ==
At the outbreak of the Korean War, she was fitted out for emergency ammunition carrying service, participating thereafter in the Inchon invasion in September 1950. Early in 1951, she was converted to carry refrigerated cargo, and in September resumed cargo duty bearing supplies to warships until the end of hostilities.

== Vietnam War service ==
From 25 August to 2 September 1954, she made five trips in support of "Operation Passage to Freedom", the evacuation of refugees from North Vietnam. Subsequently, she performed her logistics services for the fleet in the western Pacific, with only brief interludes as in May through July 1957 when she transported an Air Force team which was surveying the habitability of prospective stations in the Sulu Sea.

Note: The year of the Sulu Sea Operation appears to be incorrect (unless there were two). I participated in that operation and I left the ship in July 1956. During the 1956 operation, her crew also performed reconnaissance of strategic access features which earned the ship a Letter of Commendation from the Chief of Naval Operations.

== Formosan Crisis operations ==
During the Formosan crisis in 1957–58, she rendered important support with emergency lifting of ammunition from Japan to Taiwan. Estero shuttled supplies among Korea, Japan, and Hong Kong.

On 22 January 1960, Estero was decommissioned. Her name was stricken from the Navy List on 1 February 1960.

Estero earned seven battle stars in the Korean War.
