= List of World War II vessel types of the United States =

This is a List of World War II vessel types of the United States that were used during World War II. This list includes submarines, battleships, minelayers, oilers, barges, pontoon rafts and other types of water craft, boats and ships. As of 2014 this list is not complete.

== Army ==
Under the Army organization of 1940, the Army Quartermaster was charged with the responsibility of providing the Army with all water transport services except those specifically authorized; for the Corps of Engineers in river and harbor work, for the Coast Artillery Corps in mine planting, and for the Signal Corps in cable laying (the Army had no communication ships at this time). In March 1942, most of the transportation functions of the Army Quartermaster were consolidated into the Transportation Division of the newly created Services of Supply and later that same year, on 31 July, the Transportation Corps was established.

=== Coast Artillery Corps Mine Planter Service ===
The Army Mine Planter Service was responsible for the minefields of the Coast Artillery Corps' coast defenses. The largest vessels of the service were the U.S. Army Mine Planter (USAMP), which was equipped to install mines and associated control cables. Smaller vessels known as "junior mine planters" or "pup planters", were occasionally employed as mine planters, but they mostly served as freight and passenger boats for river and harbor duty with the Harbor Boat Service. In addition to the mine planters, there were distribution box boats, used for servicing the mine-cable distribution boxes and rugged utility boats called motor mine yawls.

==== Mine ships ====
L	Distribution Box Boat
M	Motor Mine Yawl
MP	Mine Planter
JMP	Junior Mine Planter

One example is:

- Wallace F. Randolph (MP-7) (ex FS-70)

=== Signal Corps ===
==== Cable ships ====
BSP	Barge, self-propelled

One example is:

- USASPB Col. William. A. Glassford (BSP-2098)

==== Communication ships ====
Army communications ships in the South West Pacific theater of World War II provided radio relay services and acted as command posts for forward elements ashore.

CS	Communications ship
CSM	Maintenance ship, a CS ship additionally equipped to perform radio repair
CSN	News ship, was used by civilian journalist
CSQ	Quarters ship, a floating dormitory
PCER	Patrol Craft, Escort, Rescue

Surviving examples include:

- PCER-848
- PS Weeroona (1910) (S-195, CSQ-1)

Schooners

- Argosy Lemal (S-6)
- Harold (S-58, CS-3)
- Geoanna (IX-61, TP-249, S-382, CS-1)
- Volador (IX-59, TP-248, S-385, CSM-1)

=== Transportation Corps - Water Division ===
==== South West Pacific Area (SWPA) - Services of Supply (USASOS) ====
Operated in the Southwest Pacific Area.

===== Small Ships Section =====
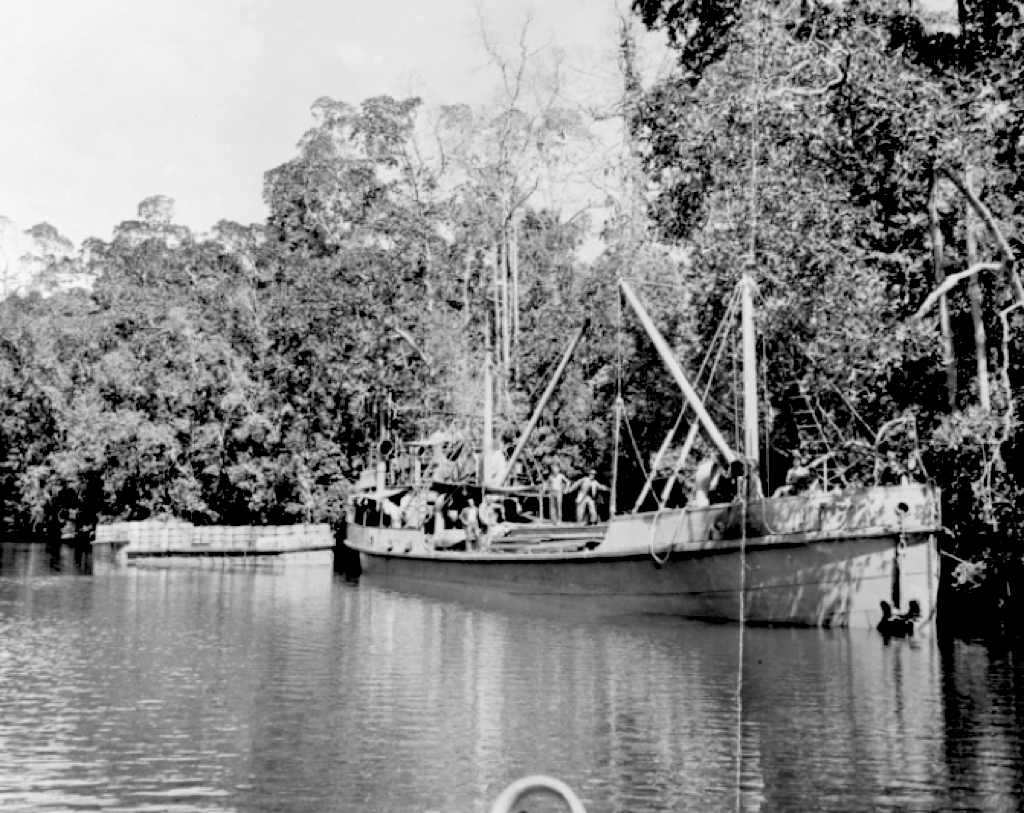
Tassie III (S-77) of the Small Ships Section, United States Army Services of Supply, Southwest Pacific Area (USASOSSWPA) at a hideout at Mubo Salamaua Area, Morobe, New Guinea 1943.

As there was a need for a fleet of shallow-draft vessels that could navigate among coral reefs, use primitive landing places far up the coast of New Guinea, and land along the outlying islands. An "S" fleet under Army control was created using local Australian vessels crewed largely by civilian Australians and New Zealanders. It was a miscellaneous collection of luggers, rusty trawlers, old schooners, launches, ketches, yawls, and yachts.

==== Water Branch - Army Transport Service (ATS) ====
The Army Transport Service (ATS), originating with the Quartermaster Corps in 1898 and continuing into Transportation Corps as a division, operated the Army's large ships, most of which were transports, but ATS also manned the Army's large cable ships.

Troop ships

Troop ships included the following.

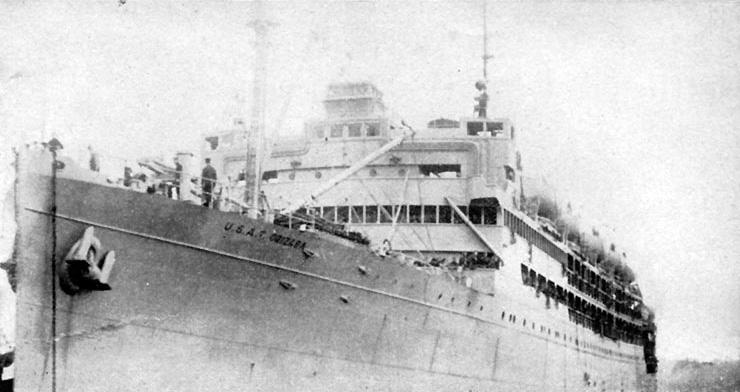
USAT Orizaba in port, 1941

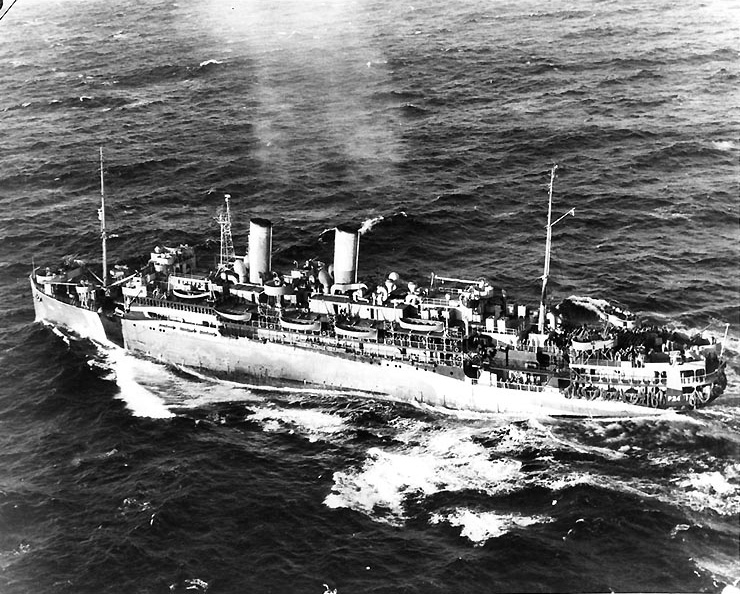
USS Orizaba (AP-24) underway at se, c. 1944

Surviving examples include:

- USAT Agwileon
- USAT George Washington
- USAT Orizaba

Sunk

- USAT Cynthia Olsen (sunk 7 December 1941)
- USAT Meigs
- USAT Liberty
- USAT General John McE. Hyde

Cargo ships over 1,000 tons

Cargo ships moved freight around the world.

==== Harbor Branch - Harbor Boat Service (HBS) ====
FM 55-130 Small Boats and Harbor Craft

Harbor Vessels

The Harbor Craft Company is organized for the purpose of ferrying to shore cargo from freighters and transports arriving in theaters of operation. The vessels may either be riding offshore at anchor in the open sea or more likely, anchored in a harbor. Cargo from the ships is loaded by Transportation Corps port company personnel onto barges. Then tugs, tow boats, or marine tractors propel the barges to the shore for unloading. Any cargo too heavy for the vessel's gear to lift is handled by a 60-ton floating crane.

- B Barge or Lorcha
- BB Balloon Barge
- BBP Balloon Barrage Leader
- BC Cargo Barge (Med. 110'-130')
- BCS Cargo Barge (Sm. 45' - 60')
- BCL Cargo Barge (Large - 210' or more)
- BD Derrick and Crane Barges
- BDP Pontoon Derrick Barge
- BK Knocked-down barge
- BG Gasoline Barge
- BSP Self-propelled Barge
- BW Water Barge
- BTL Truck Lighter
- C Navy Type Launch (Obsolete designation)
- CL Landing Boat
- D Dory and Dinghie
- G Marine Tractor
- HA Hoisting or Retrieving Vessel
- JR Radio Controlled Boat
- J Launch up to 50'
- MT Motor Towboat (Sm. 26')
- MTL Motor Towboat (Large, over 26')
- OB Outboard Launch - Detachable Motor
- OBM Outboard Motor - Stationary Motor
- Q Launch, more than 60'
- R Rowboat
- TKL Tank Lighter
- V Speed Boat
- Y Tanker - 176'

Cargo ships under 1,000 tons

Coastwise and inter-island cargo ships, sometimes known as coastal freighters.

Small Boat Company

The small boat company provided regular coastal and island service to bases in the Aleutian and Pacific Islands to supply food and equipment transported by small coastal and inter-island vessels and water craft that were under 200 feet or under 1,000 gross tons of the following vessel types.

- Ferry
- Tanker
- Water Boat
- Motor Launch
- Seagoing Tug
- Freight-Passenger Vessel

T	tender lighter towing vessel transport boat	Vessel 65' Wood
TP	tug, passenger	Utility Vessel 96' Wood (Design 333) - Harbor Tug
TP	trawler tow boat purse seiner sailing schooner	Freight & Passenger Vessel (Small) - under 100' (plus private vessels refitted for wartime service)
F		Cargo Vessel 99' Steel
FT		Vessel 115' Wood
FP		Freight & Passenger Vessel (Large) - over 100' (plus private vessels refitted for wartime service)
FS	small, 99' and under	Freight and Supply Vessel (F, FT & FP were reclassified FS early in World War II)
FS	medium, 100' to 139'	Freight and Supply Vessel (F, FT & FP were reclassified FS early in World War II)
FS	large, 140' and over	Freight and Supply Vessel (F, FT & FP were reclassified FS early in World War II)

FS-80 to FS-90 were merchant vessels refitted for wartime operation

Built during World War II:

- F-76
- FS-64
- FS-206
- FS-240
- FS-244
- FS-246
- FS-263
- FS-344
- FS-391
- T-57
- T-89
- T-147
- TP-225

QS	Quick Supply Boat: Design 235-C (Boat, Supply, High Speed, Gasoline, Wood, 104'), see P type
ST	Small Tug, under 100'
LT	Large Tug, over 100'

Surviving examples include:

- LT-5 the only surviving Army vessel that participated in the D-Day Normandy landing.
- LT-152
- LT-638

=== Air Corps - Quartermaster Corps (QMC) boat service ===
Late in 1943 all rescue-boat activities were reassigned to the Army Air Forces.

Unit Designation Chronology

1. Air Corps Marine Rescue Service
2. Quartermaster Boat Company, Avn. (note; Avn=Aviation)
3. AAF Emergency Rescue Boat Squadron (ERBS)

==== Rescue Boats ====
Rescue boats included the following.

SG	Swamp Glider
P	Rescue Boat, various sizes (42', 63', 85', 104'). Also referred too as a Crash Boat or Crash Rescue Boat. Design 235 (Boat, Rescue, Gasoline, Wood, 104'), see QS type

=== Corps of Engineers ===
==== Rivers & Harbors Division ====
Reorganized 6 June 1942 as Construction Division - Engineering and Operations branches.

towboat	a powerful small boat designed to pull or push larger vessels
dredge	a vessel equipped for digging out the bed of a water way
snagboat	a vessel equipped for removing obstructions in a water way

Surviving examples include:

- Sergeant Floyd (towboat)
- William M. Black (dredge)
- Montgomery (snagboat)
- WT Preston

==== Troops Division ====
The 1943 Engineer Field Manual described a table of organization and equipment for specialized types of engineering units. These included:

- Engineer Units, Combat, with Army Ground Forces
- Engineer Units, Service, with Army Ground Forces
- Engineer Units with Army Air Forces
- Engineer Units with Army Service Forces
- Port Repair Ship
- Port Construction and Repair group
- Engineer Amphibian Brigades

Port & Harbor Rehabilitation

The engineer Engineer Port Repair ship is equipped with repair facilities that include a heavy crane and a machine shop and maintains channels and ship berths by removing sunken ships and other obstructions. It also maintains channel markings and other aids for pilots. It does needed work on docks and wharves in conjunction with engineer port construction and repair groups.

Port Construction and Repair Group

The primary mission of the engineer port construction and repair group is to make ready for use the facilities of ports of debarkation in a theater of operations. and to perform work involved in improvement or expansion of such ports, exclusive of harbors. Its work is performed in conjunction with engineer port repair ship operations offshore.

The construction platoon consists of a divers' section under the supervision of an officer, as master diver. Enlisted personnel consists of marine divers and divers' attendants. This section does underwater work incident to construction of quay walls, wharves, piers, etc.

Militarized Dredge	3-inch gun turrets (fore and aft), 20-millimeter gun turrets (midship)
Port Repair Ship	workshops, cranes, machine shops, U.S. Army divers' complement

Surviving examples include:

- Junior N. Van Noy, only one of the ten Port Repair Ships that was not a Maritime Commission type N3-M-A1 type conversion.

Near-short units

The Engineer Amphibian Brigade, redesignated in 1943 as Engineer Special Brigade provided personnel and equipment for transporting combat troops from a friendly near shore to a hostile far shore when the distance is not over 100 miles. The brigade resupplies these troops during the early stages of establishing a beachhead. The brigade can transport one division when reinforced by naval LCT boats.

LCM	Landing Craft Mechanized
P	Command Boat (Crash boat 63')

- 2+1/2-ton amphibian trucks,
- command and navigation boats
- tank lighters
- patrol boats
- surf-landing boats

River crossing units

Reconnaissance Boat	small two-man inflatable rubber boat
M-2 Assault Boat	10 man plywood boat that could also be used for infantry support rafts or used in the assembly of an expedient assault boat bridge
Storm Boat	8 man (6+2 crew) hi speed powerboat with a 55 HP Outboard Motor, designed to beach at speed, thus allowing the soldiers on board to "Storm the Shore"
DUKW	A six-wheel-drive amphibious truck
Landing Vehicle Tracked (LVT)	amphibious vehicle
Treadway Bridge	steel treadway laid on pneumatic floats
Ponton bridge	heavy ponton (25 ton) and light ponton (10 ton)
ponton-raft	

Treadway bridge company

A Treadway bridge company is attached to an armored division in river-crossing operations to provide a bridge for heavy vehicles. Equipment included a steel-treadway bridge M1, providing a floating bridge about 1,080 feet long, or a steel-treadway bridge M2, providing a floating bridge about 864 feet long.

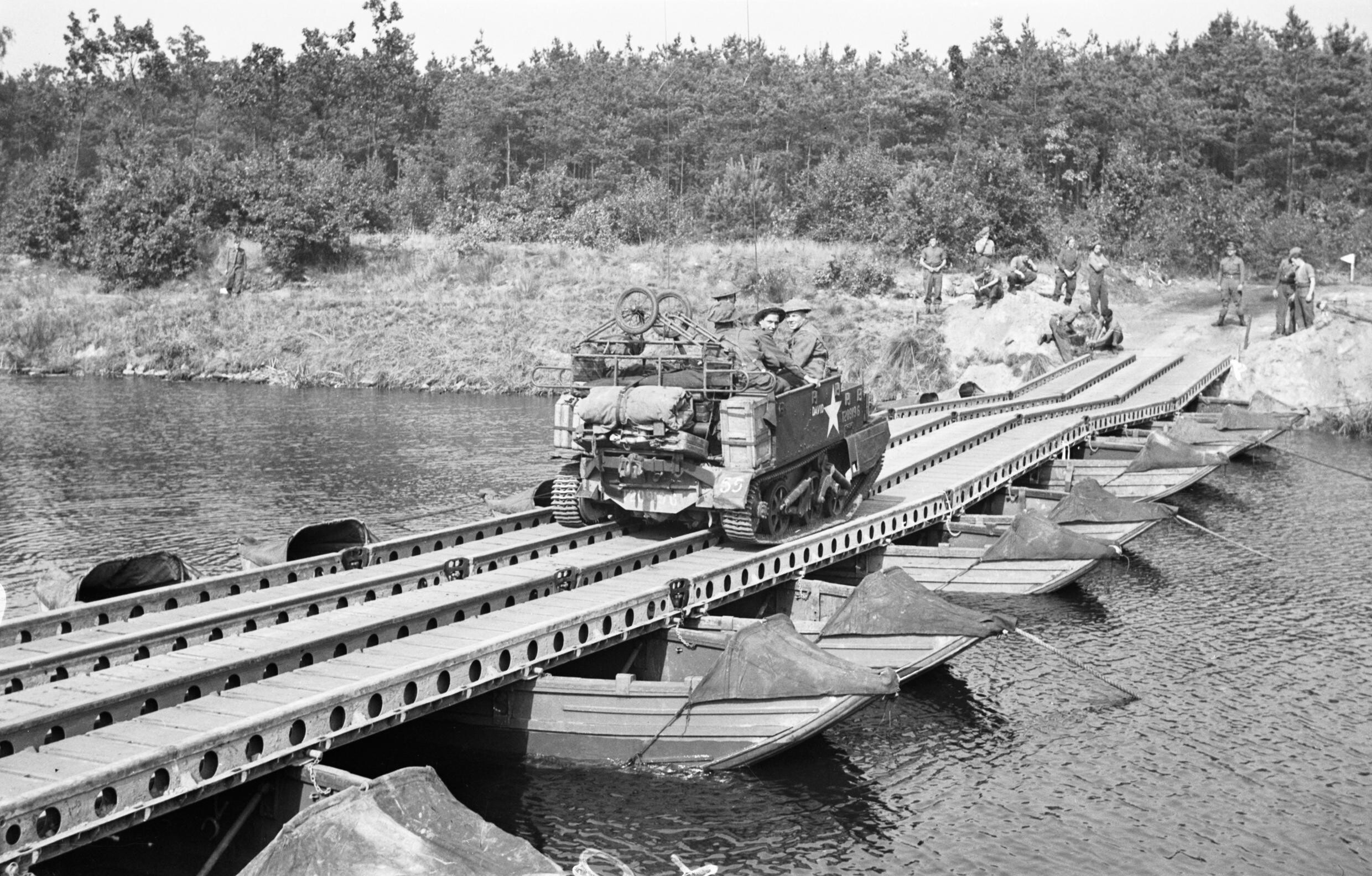
Crossing the Meuse into the Netherlands using a Pontoon Bridge

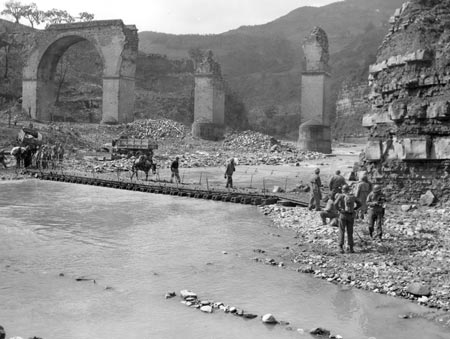
An M1938 portable footbridge

Light ponton company

The company is attached to a division in river-crossing operations to provide bridges and rafts. Equipment included two units of M3 pneumatic bridge equipage or two units of M1938 10-ton ponton bridge equipment.

Their stream-crossing equipment included:

One unit of footbridge, M1938
Four ferry set, No. 1, Infantry Support
Twelve raft, set No. 1, Infantry Support
Seventy assault boats, M2

Heavy ponton battalion

The Heavy ponton battalion was attached to a corps in river-crossing operations to provide bridges and rafts capable of supporting heavier loads. Bridges and rafts are constructed of four units of 25-ton heavy ponton equipment, M1940.

- Airborne Engineer Battalion (pneumatic reconnaissance boats)
- Combat Engineer Battalion

- 15 boat, reconnaissance, pneumatic, canvas, 2-man
- 14 boat, assault, M-2, with paddles and canvas bag

== Maritime Commission vessels ==
Vessels operated by the Maritime Commission included Liberty and Victory Ships.

=== Liberty ship ===
Surviving examples include:

- SS John W. Brown
- SS Jeremiah O'Brien, the only surviving Merchant Marine ship which was in the D-Day armada.

=== Victory ship ===
Surviving examples include:

- SS Kingsport Victory
- SS Simmons Victory (end USS Liberty (AGTR-5))
- SS Lane Victory

== Navy ==
=== Amphibious warfare type ===
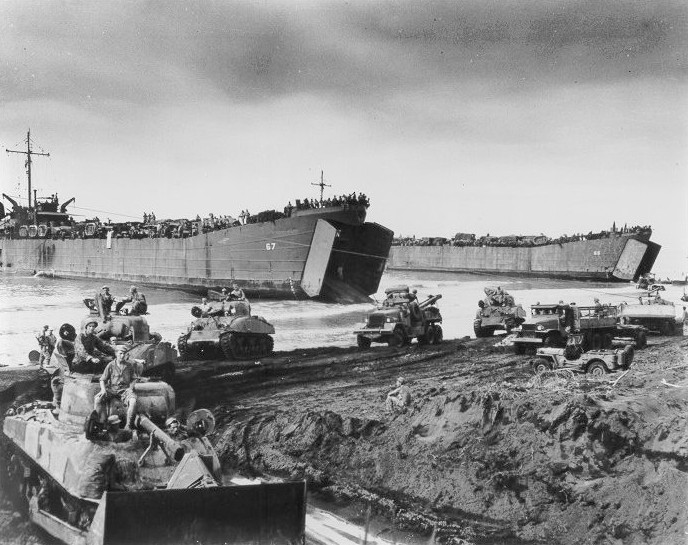
LST disembark M4 Sherman tanks and other vehicles during the invasion of Noemfoor Island, 1944.

- WWII British terminology
- Amphibious Force Flagship
- Landing Ship, Headquarters
- Attack Transport
- Landing Ship, Infantry

Amphibious warfare vessels include all ships with organic capability for amphibious warfare and which have characteristics enabling long duration operations on the high seas. There are two classifications of craft: amphibious warfare ships which are built to cross oceans, and landing craft, which are designed to take troops from ship to shore in an invasion. Some vessels called "landing ships" did not have the capability to off-load troops and supplies onto beaches; they were just transports or command-and-control vessels.

=== Ships ===
- AGC: Amphibious Force Flagship

- class anewed (1969) too, LCC—Amphibious Command Ship

- AKA: Attack Cargo Ship
- APA: Attack Transport
- APD: High speed transport
- LSD: Landing Ship, Dock
- LSM: Landing Ship, Medium

- LSMR or LSM(R)—Landing Ship, Medium (Rocket)

- LST: Landing Ship, Tank

- LSTH or LST(H)—Landing Ship, Tank (Hospital)

- LSV: Landing Ship, Vehicle

Landing Craft

- LCC: Landing Craft, Control
- LCFF, LC(FF): Flotilla Flagship
- LCI, LCIL or LCI(L): Landing Craft, Infantry (Large)

- class anewed (1949) too, LSI—Landing Ship, Infantry
- LCI(G)(M)(R)—Landing Craft, Infantry (Gunboat) (Mortar) (Rocket)

- LCM : Landing Craft, Mechanized
- LCP, LCPL, or LCP(L): Landing Craft, Personnel (Large)
- LCR, LCRS or LCR(S): Landing Craft, Rubber (Small)
- LCR, LCRL or LCR(L): Landing Craft, Rubber (Large)
- LCSS, LCS(S) : Landing Craft, Support (Small), an LCP(L) conversion, fitted with heavy machine guns
- LCS, LCSL or LCS(L): Landing Craft, Support (Large)

- class anewed (1949) too, LSSL—Landing Ship, Support (Large)

- LCT: Landing Craft, Tank

- class anewed (1949) too, LSU—Landing Ship, Utility
- class anewed (1956) too, LCU—Landing Craft, Utility

- LCV: Landing Craft, Vehicle

- LCVP or LCV(P): Landing Craft, Vehicle (Personnel)

- an LCV, fitted with 1/4 inch armor
- LCA—Landing Craft, Assault (British term for LCVP)

=== Other types ===
Aircraft Carriers

Fleet Aircraft Carriers CV
Light Aircraft Carriers CVL
Escort Carriers CVE

Battleships

Battleships BB

Cruisers

Large Cruisers CB
Heavy Cruisers CA
Light Cruisers CL

Destroyers

Destroyers DD
Destroyer Escorts DE

Submarines

Submarines SS

Minesweepers

Minelayers & Coastal Minelayers CM
Light Minelayers DM
Auxiliary Minelayers ACM
Minesweepers AM
Coastal Minesweepers AMc
Fast Minesweepers DMS
Motor Minesweepers YMS

Patrol Craft

Gunboats PG
Converted Yachts PG
Frigates PF
River Gunboats PR
Smaller Converted Yachts PY
Coastal Yachts PYc
Escort Patrol Craft PCE
Eagle Boats PE
Patrol Craft, Sweepers PCS
Motor Gunboats PGM

Submarine Chasers

Submarine Chasers (Steel Hull) PC
Submarine Chasers (Wooden Hull) SC

Motor Torpedo Boats

Motor Torpedo Boats PT
Motor Boat Submarine Chasers PTC

Auxiliaries

Crane Ship AB
Advanced Base Section Dock ABSD
Advanced Base Dock ABD
Destroyer Tenders AD
Ammunition Ships AE
Provision Store Ships AF
Auxiliary Floating Dock AFD
Large Auxiliary Floating Dock (non-self-propelled) AFDB
Small Auxiliary Floating Dock (non-self-propelled) AFDL
Medium Auxiliary Floating Dock (non-self-propelled) AFDM
Miscellaneous Auxiliaries AG
Amphibious Force Command Ships AGC
MTB Tenders AGP
Surveying Ships AGS

Hospital Ships

Hospital Ships AH

Cargo Ships

Cargo Ships AK
Attack Cargo Ships AKA
Net Cargo Ships AKN
General Stores Issue Ships AKS
Cargo Ships and Aircraft Ferries AKV

Net-Laying Ships AN Oilers & Tankers

Oilers AO
Gasoline Tankers AOG

Transports

Transports AP
Attack Transports APA
Self-Propelled Barracks Ships APB
Coastal Transports APc
High-Speed Transports APD
Evacuation Transports APH
Barracks Ships APL
Mechanized Artillery Transport APM
Transport Submarine APS
Aircraft Ferries APV

Repair Ships

Repair Ships AR
Battle-Damage Repair Ships ARB
Auxiliary Repair Dock (Concrete) ARDC
Internal Combustion Engine Repair Ships ARG
Heavy Hull Repair Ships ARH
Landing Craft Repair Ships ARL
Salvage Vessels ARS
Salvage Craft Tenders ARS(T)
Aircraft Repair Ships (Aircraft) ARV(A)
Aircraft Repair Ships (Engine) ARV(E)

Submarine Tenders & Rescue Vessels

Submarine Tenders AS
Submarine Rescue Vessels ASR

Tugboats

Auxiliary Tugs ATA
Fleet Ocean Tugs ATF
Old Ocean Tugs ATO
Rescue Tugs ATR

Seaplane Tenders & Aviation Supply Ships

Seaplane Tenders AV
Catapult Lighter AVC
Seaplane Tenders (Destroyers) AVD
Small Seaplane Tenders AVP
Aviation's Supply Ships AVS

Distilling Ships

Distilling Ships AW

Unclassified Vessels

Unclassified Vessels IX

Yard and District Craft Coast Guard Cutters

Cruising Cutters WPG
Weather Patrol Ships WIX
Weather Patrol Cutters WPC
Icebreakers WAG

== See also ==
- Hull classification symbol
- List of hull classifications
- War Shipping Administration
- United States Maritime Commission
- Services of Supply
- World War II United States Merchant Navy
- South West Pacific Area (command)
