= USS Roque =

Cargo ship of the United States Navy

History

United States
- Name: USS Roque
- Namesake: An island off the coast of Maine
- Builder: Kewaunee Shipbuilding Co., Kewaunee, Wisconsin
- Laid down: date unknown
- Completed: as U.S. Army FS-347, date unknown
- Acquired: by the U.S. Navy, 21 February 1947, at Navy Yard Subic Bay, Philippines
- Commissioned: 2 May 1947 as USS Roque (AG-137) at Apra Harbor, Guam
- Decommissioned: 23 July 1951
- Reclassified: AKL-8, 31 March 1949
- Stricken: date not known
- Identification: IMO number: 7050638
- Fate: Transferred to the U.S. Department of the Interior, 29 January 1952

General characteristics
- Type: Camano-class cargo ship
- Displacement: 550 tons
- Length: 177 ft (54 m)
- Beam: 33 ft (10 m)
- Draft: 10 ft (3.0 m)
- Propulsion: two 500hp GM Cleveland Division 6-278A 6-cyl V6 diesel engines, twin screws
- Speed: 12 knots
- Complement: 42 officers and enlisted
- Armament: not known

USS Roque (AG-137/AKL-8) was a Camano-class cargo ship constructed for the U.S. Army as USA FS-347 shortly before the end of World War II and later acquired by the U.S. Navy in 1947. She was configured as a transport and cargo ship and was assigned to serve the World War II Trust Territories in the Pacific Ocean.

== Constructed at Kewaunee, Wisconsin ==
Roque, built in 1944 by the Kewaunee Ship Building Co., Kewaunee, Wisconsin, for the U.S. Army as freight supply ship FS-347, was acquired by the Navy at Subic Bay, Philippine Islands, 21 February 1947; renamed and reclassified Roque (AG-137) on 3 April 1947; and commissioned at Guam, 2 May 1947.

== Pacific Trust Territory services ==
On 11 June she relieved LSM-437 at Guam. She subsequently steamed on Pacific Ocean logistic and surveillance runs visiting various ports in the Mariana Islands, the Marshall Islands, the Caroline Islands, the Philippines, the Bonin Islands, the Admiralty Islands, and the Hawaiian Islands.

Roque was reclassified AKL-8 on 31 March 1949.

== Transfer to the Interior Department ==
Completing her 4-year naval career, she was decommissioned at Guam 23 July 1951 and loaned to the U.S. Department of the Interior, then struck from the Navy List 29 January 1952 and transferred to the U.S. Department of the Interior for service in the Pacific Trust Territories.

Her subsequent fate is not known.
