= USS Torry =

Cargo ship of the United States Navy

History

United States
- Name: USS Torry
- Namesake: Torry, an island off Lake Okeechobee
- Builder: Ingalls Shipbuilding Corporation, Decatur, Alabama
- Laid down: 1944
- Launched: 1944
- Completed: 1944
- Acquired: 22 February 1947
- Commissioned: 5 July 1947
- In service: 1944
- Reclassified: AKL-11, 31 March 1949
- Stricken: 29 January 1952
- Fate: transferred to Department of the Interior, 29 January 1952

General characteristics
- Class & type: Camano-class cargo ship
- Type: Light Cargo Ship
- Tonnage: 620 GRT
- Displacement: 414 tons(lt); 940 tons(fl)
- Length: 177 ft
- Beam: 32 ft
- Draft: 10 ft
- Propulsion: Two 500 hp GM Cleveland Division 6-278A 6-cyl V6 diesel engines, twin screws
- Speed: 12 knots
- Complement: 26 officers and enlisted

USS Torry (AKL-11) was a Camano-class cargo ship of the United States Navy. During World War II, she previously served as the United States Army Transport FS-394. After being acquired by the United States Navy, the ship was commissioned as USS Torry (AG-140), but was later reclassified as a light cargo ship. On 29 January 1952, she was transferred to the Department of the Interior and was sold to Socony-Mobil in 1961. The ship was successively sold to several companies before becoming a fishing vessel and was scuttled in 2015 off the coast of Delaware as an artificial reef.

== Service history ==
FS-394, a Design 381 coastal freighter of the United States Army, was built during 1944 by Ingalls Shipbuilding and commissioned on 14 December in the same year. She was manned by United States Coast Guard personnel and her first commander was Lieutenant H.J. Whitmore, a Coast Guard reservist. FS-394 operated in the Asiatic-Pacific Theater. On 22 February 1947, she was acquired by the United States Navy at Subic Bay. The ship was named Torry and designated AG-140 on 3 April 1947. Torry was commissioned at Guam on 5 July 1947. After August, she operated in the Mariana Islands and the Caroline Islands, performing logistic duties. On 31 March 1949, she was reclassified as AKL-11.

On 24 July 1951, she was loaned to the Department of the Interior at Guam. The transfer was made permanent and Torry was struck on 29 January 1952. Serving with the Department of the Interior, she provided transport in the Trust Territory of the Pacific Islands. In 1961, she was sold to Socony-Mobil and transferred to American MARC in 1963. She was finally transferred to the Western Offshore Drilling and Exploration Company in 1965. At an unknown date, the ship was sold to Omega Protein and was gutted for use as a menhaden fishing vessel. While a fishing vessel, she was renamed Shearwater. The vessel was sold to the state of Delaware for used as an artificial reef and in 2015 was scuttled off the state's coast by Delaware Department of Natural Resources contractors Coleen Marine. **

  - This is wrong. Shearwater was FS-411 / AG-177.
