= Camano-class cargo ship =

Class of fourteen light cargo ships of the United States Navy

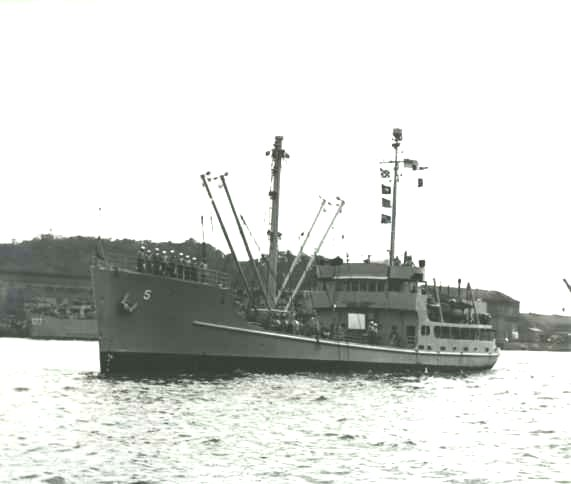
- USS Estero (AKL-5) at Sasebo on 28 October 1953

Class overview
- Name: Camano class
- Operators: United States Navy
- Subclasses: None
- Built: 1944
- Completed: 15

General characteristics
- Type: Light Cargo Ship (AKL)
- Displacement: 520 tons light, 935 tons full
- Length: 177 ft (54 m)
- Beam: 33 ft (10 m)
- Draft: 10 ft (3.0 m)
- Propulsion: 2 x 500 hp (370 kW) GM Cleveland Division 6-278A 6-cyl V6 diesel engines
- Speed: 12 knots (22 km/h; 14 mph)
- Complement: 26

The Camano class was a class of light cargo ships of the United States Navy. The fifteen ships of the class were originally built as Design 381 coastal freighters or Design 427 coastal freighters and were converted to light cargo ships during 1949 and 1950 after acquisition by the United States Navy.

== Ships in class ==
Name	Acquired	Commissioned	Fate
Camano (AKL-1)	16 July 1947	16 July 1947	Unknown
Deal (AKL-2)	2 March 1947	3 August 1947	Sold 18 December 1961
Elba (AKL-3)	14 March 1947	3 July 1947	transferred to Department of the Interior 29 January 1952
Errol (AKL-4)	3 April 1947	9 July 1947	transferred to Department of the Interior 29 January 1952
Estero (AKL-5)	March 1947	5 July 1947	struck 1 February 1960
Jekyl (AKL-6)	22 February 1947	2 May `1947	Sold 18 May 1960
Metomkin (AKL-7)	28 February 1947	16 August 1947	struck 16 January 1952
Roque (AKL-8)	21 February 1947	2 May 1947	struck 29 January 1952
Ryer (AKL-9)	22 February 1947	8 June 1947	struck 1 July 1961; scrapped
Sharps (AKL-10)	March 1947	3 August 1947	struck 20 August 1971, sold to South Korean Navy as Kun San
Torry (AKL-11)	22 February 1947	3 April 1947	struck 29 January 1952
Mark (AKL-12)	30 September 1947	2 December 1947	transferred to Republic of China Navy 1971
Tingles (AKL-13)	September 1947	2 December 1947	struck 1969, renamed MV Ran-Annim, scrapped in 1982
Hewell (AKL-14)	2 February 1948	5 June 1948	struck 1 November 1959
New Bedford (AKL-17)	1 July 1950	1 July 1950	struck 4 April 1995
