= USS Sharps =

Cargo ship of the United States Navy

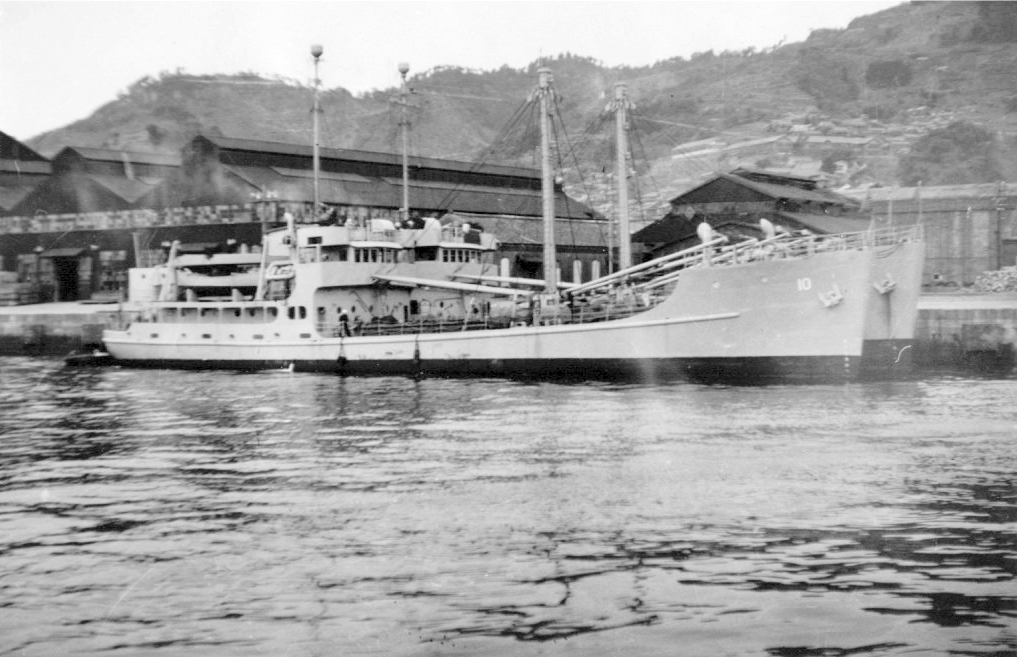
- Sharps docked at Sasebo, Japan, in early 1952

History

United States
- Name: USS Sharps
- Namesake: Sharps Island off the coast of Maryland
- Builder: Ingalls Shipbuilding Corp., Decatur, Alabama
- Completed: date unknown, as U.S. Army FS-385
- Acquired: by the U.S. Navy in March 1947
- Commissioned: 3 August 1947 as USS Sharps (AG-139) at Guam
- Decommissioned: 1955 at Astoria, Oregon
- Reclassified: AKL-10, 31 March 1949
- Stricken: 20 August 1974
- Honours and awards: three battle stars for Korean service
- Fate: Transferred to the South Korean Navy 3 April 1955 as Gunsan (AKL-908)
- Notes: subsequent fate unknown

General characteristics
- Type: Camano-class cargo ship
- Displacement: 520 tons light; 935 tons full load
- Length: 177 ft (54 m)
- Beam: 33 ft (10 m)
- Draft: 10 ft (3.0 m)
- Propulsion: two 500hp GM Cleveland Division 6-278A 6-cyl V6 diesel engines, twin screws
- Speed: 12 knots
- Complement: 26 officers and enlisted

USS Sharps (AG-139/AKL-10) was a Camano-class cargo ship constructed for the U.S. Army as USA FS-385 shortly before the end of World War II and later acquired by the U.S. Navy in 1947. She was configured as a transport and cargo ship and was assigned to serve the World War II Trust Territories in the Pacific Ocean. She later served with distinction in the Korean War.

== Constructed in Decatur, Alabama ==
Sharps (AG-139) was built in 1944 by Ingalls Shipbuilding Corp., Decatur, Alabama; operated by the U.S. Army as a freight supply ship (USA FS-385) in the Pacific Ocean until being transferred to the Navy at Guam in March 1947. She was converted to Navy use and commissioned there on 3 August 1947.

== Trust territory service ==
One of a group of small Army cargo ships transferred to the Navy for use among the Pacific islands, Sharps provided logistic support to the Trust Territories of the Marshall Islands and the Caroline Islands.

In August 1949, Sharps sailed to Pearl Harbor for an overhaul. From there, she steamed to American Samoa. She arrived there on 4 November 1949 and served as station ship for the next 10 months. She returned to Pearl Harbor and served as an ammunition disposal ship until she was overhauled in late 1951.

== Korean War service ==
When the yard work was completed, Sharps stood out of Pearl Harbor and sailed for Sasebo, Japan. She operated out of that port from 3 November 1951 until 17 May 1952, supporting the United Nations' forces in Inchon and Pohang, Korea. Sharps returned to Guam and central Pacific operations until her home port was again changed to Sasebo on 9 August 1954. She operated in Japanese waters until November 1955 when she sailed for Pearl Harbor, en route to the United States.

== Post-war decommissioning ==
Sharps arrived at Astoria, Oregon, on 13 December 1955. In March 1956, she moved to Seattle, Washington; and, on 3 April, she was leased to South Korea as Kun San (AKL-908).

== Honors and awards ==
Sharps received three battle stars for Korean War service:

- UN Summer-Fall Offensive
- Second Korean Winter
- Korean Defense Summer-Fall 1952
