= USS Ryer =

Cargo ship of the United States Navy

History

United States
- Name: USS Ryer
- Namesake: Ryer Island off the coast of California
- Builder: Kewaunee Ship Building Co., Kewaunee, Wisconsin
- Laid down: 1944 in Wisconsin
- Completed: as U.S. Army FS-361, 28 February 1944
- Acquired: by the U.S. Navy, 22 February 1947
- Commissioned: 8 June 1947 as USS Ryer (AG-138)
- Decommissioned: 4 August 1955, at Astoria, Oregon
- Reclassified: AKL-9, 31 March 1949
- Stricken: 1 July 1961
- Home port: Guam
- Identification: IMO number: 6415752
- Honours and awards: six battle stars for service in the Korean War
- Fate: sold, 25 January 1962
- Notes: later known as Ahti, Caldrill 1, and West 1

General characteristics
- Type: Camano-class cargo ship
- Displacement: 520 tons light; 935 tons full load
- Length: 177 ft (54 m)
- Beam: 33 ft (10 m)
- Draft: 10 ft (3.0 m)
- Propulsion: two 500hp GM Cleveland Division 6-278A 6-cyl V6 diesel engines, twin screws
- Speed: 12 knots
- Complement: 26 officers and enlisted

USS Ryer (AG-138/AKL-9) was a Camano-class cargo ship constructed for the U.S. Army as the Freight and Supply Ship USA FS-361 shortly before the end of World War II. On delivery the ship was U.S. Coast Guard crewed and assigned to serve the Southwest Pacific area during the war. The ship was acquired by the U.S. Navy in 1947, configured as a transport and cargo ship, named and was Commissioned, Miscellaneous Auxiliary, USS Ryer (AG-138), 8 June 1947 and reclassified Light Cargo Ship, (AKL-9), 31 March 1949.

After that, it was converted to drill ship Caldrill I, one of the first equipped with dynamic positioning (DP), and to West I as fish processing vessel that on its last trip became part of an insurance fraud by Thomas Edward Utter, described in Trail of the Fox by Lawrence Eric Taylor.

== U.S. Army ==
FS-361 was built in 1944 for the U.S. Army by the Sturgeon Bay Ship Building & Dry Docking Co. of Sturgeon Bay, Wisconsin designated FS-361 on 28 February 1944 and launched September 1944. The ship was Coast Guard crewed and assigned to the Southwest Pacific area during the war.

== U.S. Navy ==
The ship transferred to the Navy 22 February 1947; named Ryer and designated AG-138 on 3 April 1947; and commissioned on 8 June 1947. Redesignated AKL-9 on 31 March 1949, USS Ryer was used by the Navy until the summer of 1950 on logistic support and surveillance missions in the Mariana Islands, the Caroline Islands, the Bonin Islands, and the Marshall Islands. During the Korean War, she carried ammunition between Sasebo, Nagasaki and various Korean ports, including Pusan and Inchon, from September 1950 to September 1951. From Korean duty, the ship returned to logistic support and surveillance duties in Micronesia, with her home port at Guam. She continued this service until returning to the United States for decommissioning.

== Final decommissioning ==
Ryer was placed in commission, in reserve, on 18 June 1955 and out of commission, in reserve, at Astoria, Oregon, on 4 August 1955. At Astoria until struck from the Navy List at San Diego, California, on 1 July 1961, she was delivered to her purchaser, Pacific Tow-Boat & Salvage Co., Long Beach, California, on 25 January 1962.

== Honors and awards ==
Ryer earned six battle stars for service in the Korean War:

- North Korean Aggression
- Communist China Aggression
- Inchon Landing
- First UN Counter-offensive
- Communist China Spring Offensive
- UN Summer-Fall Offensive
