= USS Elba =

Cargo ship of the United States Navy

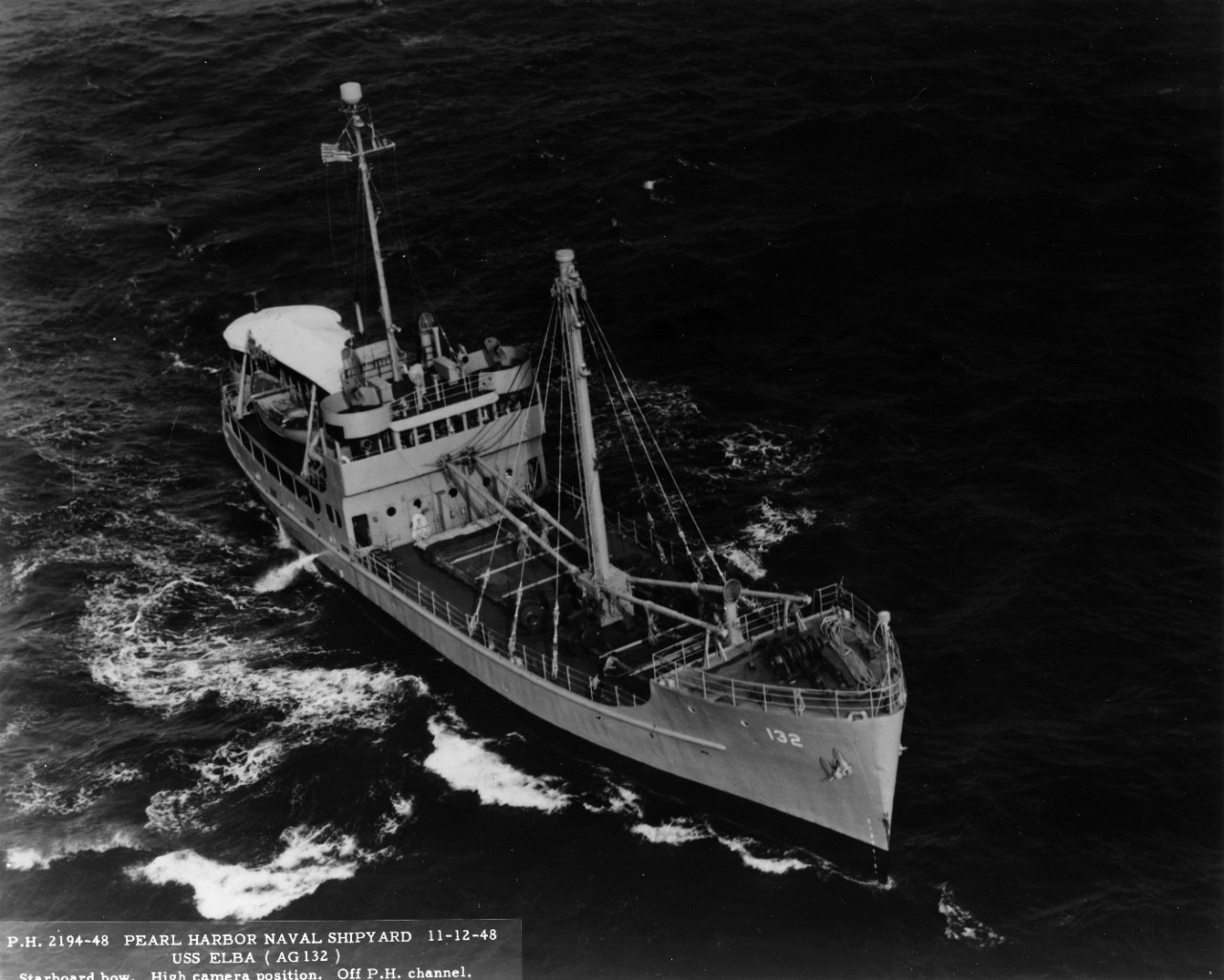
- USS Elba in 1948

History

United States
- Name: USS Elba
- Namesake: Elba Island, off the coast of Georgia
- Builder: Wheeler Shipbuilding Corp., Whitestone, Long Island, New York
- Laid down: date unknown as U.S. Army FS-267 for the U.S. Army
- Launched: date unknown
- Completed: 18 September 1944
- Acquired: by the U.S. Navy, 14 March 1947, at Apra Harbor, Guam
- Commissioned: 3 July 1947 as USS Elba (AG-132)
- Decommissioned: 27 July 1951 at Guam
- Reclassified: AKL-3, 31 March 1949
- Stricken: date unknown
- Fate: Transferred to the U.S. Department of the Interior (date unknown), sold 1957, wrecked 6 August 1962

General characteristics
- Type: Camano-class cargo ship
- Displacement: 550 tons
- Length: 177 ft (54 m)
- Beam: 33 ft (10 m)
- Draft: 10 ft (3.0 m)
- Propulsion: two 500hp GM Cleveland Division 6-278A 6-cyl V6 diesel engines, twin screws
- Speed: 12 knots
- Complement: 42 officers and enlisted
- Armament: not known

USS Elba (AG-132/AKL-3) was a Camano-class cargo ship constructed for the U.S. Army as USA FS-267 shortly before the end of World War II and later acquired by the U.S. Navy in 1947. She was configured as a transport and cargo ship and was assigned to serve the World War II Trust Territories in the Pacific Ocean.

== Built on Long Island, New York ==
Elba (AG-132) was built in 1944 by Wheeler Shipbuilding Corp., Whitestone, Long Island, New York, for the Army as FS-267; acquired by the Navy at Guam 14 March 1947; renamed and commissioned 3 July 1947. She was reclassified AKL-3, 31 March 1949.

== Serving the Pacific Trust Territories ==
From her base at Guam, Elba, during her brief service, steadily carried passengers, mail, cargo and Government officials among the Caroline Islands, the Mariana Islands, the Marshall Islands, and the Palau Islands.

She operated under Commander, Service Division 51. With time out for two brief overhauls at Pearl Harbor, Elba faithfully served the administration of the Pacific Trust Territory in the Marianas, Carolines and Marshalls, even for a time after decommissioning 27 July 1951 at Guam.

== Transferred to Department of the Interior ==
She was transferred 29 January 1952 to the U.S. Department of the Interior. She was struck from the Navy List at an unknown date. She was sold in 1957 for commercial service and wrecked 6 August 1962.
