= USS Errol =

Cargo ship of the United States Navy

History

United States
- Name: USS Errol
- Namesake: An island off the coast of Louisiana
- Builder: Wheeler Shipbuilding Corp., Whitestone, Long Island, New York
- Laid down: date unknown as USA FS-274 for the U.S. Army
- Acquired: by the U.S. Navy, 3 April 1947, at Apra Harbor, Guam
- Commissioned: 9 July 1947 as USS Errol (AG-133) at Guam
- Decommissioned: 31 July 1951
- In service: 31 July 1951 with the U.S. Department of the Interior
- Reclassified: AKL-4, 31 March 1949
- Stricken: unknown date
- Fate: Transferred to the Department of the Interior, 29 January 1952

General characteristics
- Type: Camano-class cargo ship
- Displacement: 550 tons
- Length: 177 ft (54 m)
- Beam: 33 ft (10 m)
- Draft: 10 ft (3.0 m)
- Propulsion: two 500hp GM Cleveland Division 6-278A 6-cyl V6 diesel engines, twin screws
- Speed: 12 knots
- Complement: 42 officers and enlisted
- Armament: not known

USS Errol (AG-133/AKL-4) was a Camano-class cargo ship constructed for the U.S. Army as USA FS-274 shortly before the end of World War II and later acquired by the U.S. Navy in 1947. She was configured as a transport and cargo ship and was assigned to serve the World War II Trust Territories in the Pacific Ocean.

== Built on Long Island, New York ==
Errol (AG-133) was built in 1944 by Wheeler Shipbuilding Corp., Whitestone, Long Island, New York, for the U.S. Army as USAT FS-274; acquired by the Navy 3 April 1947; and commissioned 9 July 1947. She was reclassified AKL-4 on 31 March 1949.

== Service in the Trust Territory of the Pacific ==
Commissioned at Guam, Errol throughout her naval service carried passengers and cargo among American islands and those of the Trust Territory of the Pacific, calling at Guam, Saipan, Tinian, Truk, the Palau Islands, Ulithi, Chichi Jima, Kwajalein, Pagan Island, Agrihan, and smaller islands in the Caroline Islands.

From September to December 1949 she was overhauled at Pearl Harbor, the only interruption to her constant operations in the Pacific.

== Transfer to Department of the Interior ==
She was decommissioned 31 July 1951, and lent to the U.S. Department of the Interior for similar duty the same day. On 29 January 1952 her transfer to the Department of the Interior was made permanent.

Her subsequent fate is not known.
