= USS Jekyl =

Camano-class cargo ship

History

United States
- Name: USS Jekyl
- Namesake: Jekyll Island off the coast of Georgia
- Builder: Wheeler Shipbuilding Corp., Whitestone, Long Island, New York
- Laid down: 1944
- Completed: date unknown, as U.S. Army FS-282
- Acquired: by the U.S. Navy, 22 February 1947, at Apra Harbor, Guam, Mariana Islands
- Commissioned: 2 May 1947 as USS Jekyl (AG-135) at Guam
- Decommissioned: 12 April 1950, at Seattle, Washington
- Reclassified: AKL-6, 31 March 1949
- Stricken: date unknown
- Identification: IMO number: 5043605
- Fate: Sold, 18 May 1960; Wrecked in Argentina as of 2006

General characteristics
- Type: Camano-class cargo ship
- Displacement: 520 tons
- Length: 177 ft (54 m)
- Beam: 33 ft (10 m)
- Draft: 10 ft (3.0 m)
- Propulsion: two 500hp GM Cleveland Division 6-278A 6-cyl V6 diesel engines, twin screws
- Speed: 12 knots
- Complement: 26 officers and enlisted
- Armament: not known

USS Jekyl (AG-135/AKL-6) was a Camano-class cargo ship constructed for the U.S. Army as USA FS-282 shortly before the end of World War II and later acquired by the U.S. Navy in 1947. She was configured as a transport and cargo ship and was assigned post-war to support various island outposts in the Pacific Ocean.

== Built on Long Island, New York ==
Jekyl (AG-135) was built in 1944 by Wheeler Shipbuilding Corp., Long Island, New York, for the U.S. Army and served as USAT FS-282 until being transferred to the Navy at Guam 22 February 1947. She was converted to Navy use and commissioned at Guam 2 May 1947.

== Post-war Pacific Ocean support ==
One of a group of small Army cargo ships transferred to the Navy for use among the Pacific Ocean islands, Jekyl carried ammunition, food, and supplies to various island bases and outposts.

She operated mainly from Kwajalein Atoll, and steamed through the Mariana Islands and the Caroline Islands to Pearl Harbor in support of occupation forces. The ship also transported officials of the civil governments and helped carry native products as America began to restore normal life to the ravaged Pacific.

On 31 March 1949 she was reclassified AKL-6.

== Post-war decommissioning ==
The ship was relieved of her duties in December 1949 and arrived Pearl Harbor on the 15th. From there she steamed to Seattle, Washington, where she decommissioned 12 April 1950, and was placed in reserve at Astoria, Oregon. Jekyl was sold 18 May 1960.

She remained extant for the next several decades carrying various names, including Sea Princess II, Nilo, Betty K IV, and Hope I. As Hope I, she was last spotted as a wreck in Puerto Rosales, Bahía Blanca, Argentina.
