= Metompkin, Virginia =

- Census-designated place
- Location in Accomack County and the state of Virginia.
- Coordinates: 37°46′2″N 75°36′20″W
- Country: United States
- State: Virginia
- County: Accomack
- Elevation: 30 ft (9.1 m)

Population (2020)
  - Total: 490
- Time zone: UTC−5 (Eastern (EST))
  - Summer (DST): UTC−4 (EDT)
- FIPS code: 51-48776
- GNIS feature ID: 2584880

Metompkin is a census-designated place (CDP) in Accomack County, Virginia, United States. Per the 2020 census, the population was 490.

== Geography ==
The CDP lies at an elevation of 30 feet.

== Demographics ==
Historical population
Census	Pop.	Note	%±
2010	551		—
2020	490		−11.1%
U.S. Decennial Census; 2010 2020

Metompkin was first listed as a census designated place in the 2010 U.S. census.

=== 2020 census ===
Metompkin CDP, Virginia – Racial and ethnic composition Note: the US Census treats Hispanic/Latino as an ethnic category. This table excludes Latinos from the racial categories and assigns them to a separate category. Hispanics/Latinos may be of any race.
Race / Ethnicity (NH = Non-Hispanic)	Pop 2010	Pop 2020	% 2010	% 2020
White alone (NH)	43	46	7.80%	9.39%
Black or African American alone (NH)	393	333	71.32%	67.96%
Native American or Alaska Native alone (NH)	0	1	0.00%	0.20%
Asian alone (NH)	1	1	0.18%	0.20%
Pacific Islander alone (NH)	0	0	0.00%	0.00%
Other race alone (NH)	0	0	0.00%	0.00%
Mixed race or Multiracial (NH)	1	11	0.18%	2.24%
Hispanic or Latino (any race)	113	98	20.51%	20.00%
Total	551	490	100.00%	100.00%

== See also ==
- Metompkin Island
