= FS-255 =

WWII Freight and Supply ship

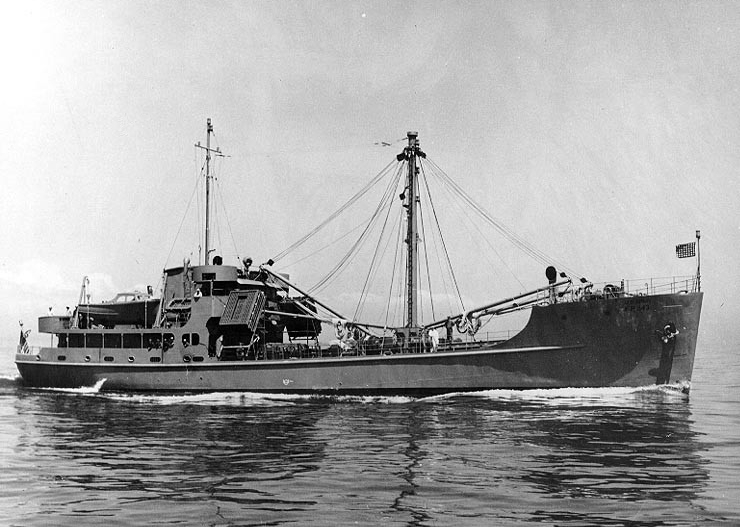
- Similar ship, a Design 381 (Vessel, Supply, Diesel, Steel, 177') FP-343 (FP later designated FS) photographed in 1944. Naval Historical and Heritage Command: Photo #: NH 74691

History

United States
- Name: FS-255
- Operator: United States Army
- Builder: Wheeler Shipbuilding, Whitestone, New York
- Commissioned: 6 June 1944
- Fate: Sunk by torpedo, 11 May 1945, Talomo Bay, Davao Gulf, Mindanao, Philippines

General characteristics
- Class & type: U.S. Army Design 381 (Vessel, Supply, Diesel, Steel, 177') Freight & Supply (FS)
- Tonnage: 560 GRT
- Length: 177 ft (54 m)
- Beam: 32 ft (9.8 m)
- Draft: 14 ft (4.3 m)
- Propulsion: 2 × 500 hp (370 kW) GM Cleveland Division 6-278A 6-cyl V6 diesel engines; 2 × screws
- Speed: 13 knots (24 km/h; 15 mph)
- Crew: 20 enlisted, 4 officers
- Armament: At least one 140mm gun aft.

FS-255 was one of the U.S. Coast Guard-manned U.S. Army Freight and Supply (FS) ships of World War II.

== Construction ==
The ship was a Design 381 coastal ship built at Wheeler Shipbuilding, Whitestone, New York and commissioned at the shipyard on 6 June 1944 with Lieutenant Ludwig Ehlers, USCG as commanding officer. On 3 August 1944 he was succeeded by Lt. Robert F. Maloney, USCGR.

== Service history ==
FS-255 with the Davao Gulf First Re-Supply Echelon was loaded with a cargo of 155-mm ammunition destined for the U.S. Army 24th Infantry Division. She was anchored on the night of 10–11 May 1945 in 17 fathoms (102 ft; 31 m) of water, 1,000 yards (910 m), 140 degrees from the pier at the head of Talomo Bay, Davao Gulf, Mindanao, Philippines with hatches open and about 80 tons of ammunition remaining to be unloaded. At 0030 on 11 May 1945 in rainy weather she was hit on her port quarter in the after crew's compartment by a torpedo.

Lt. George A. Tardif, USCG, the commanding officer, went on deck and ordered all hands checked and a search for injured. The search determined three were injured and two were missing from the crew's quarters and two who had been sleeping in hammocks on the fantail were also missing with large masses of blood found on deck.

The aft bulkhead of the engine rooms was ruptured and the main engines were nearly flooded. The wardroom, galley and mess hall aft were torn apart and impassable. The lifeboat and gig were heavily damaged with sterns blown off and out of their cradles. The ship had buckled between the #2 hatch and bridge with foot-high ridges in deck plating and extending down the ship's side to the water. Ammunition from a gun aft had been blown forward to the forecastle head near the anchor winch. The 140 mm gun was missing.

FS-255 was settling rapidly and two life rafts were launched as LCI-21 was signaled that the ship had been hit. Three minutes after the life rafts had cleared FS-255 rolled over to port and sank at 0050. LCI-21 picked up all survivors ten minutes later. Sixteen of twenty enlisted crew and all four officers survived. FS-255 sunk by IJN 5th Attack unit [Torpedo boats]

== See also ==
- Battle of Mindanao
