= USS Deal =

Cargo ship of the United States Navy

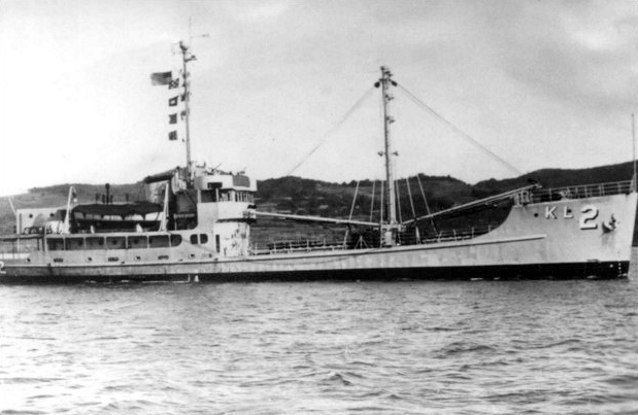
- USS Deal (AKL-2) entering Sasebo harbor, Japan, circa 1954.

History

United States
- Name: USS Deal
- Namesake: Deal Island, Maryland
- Builder: Wheeler Shipbuilding Corp., Whitestone, Long Island, New York
- Laid down: in 1944 as U.S. Army FS-263 for the U.S. Army
- Acquired: by the US Navy, 2 March 1947, at Apra Harbor, Guam
- Commissioned: 3 August 1947 as USS Deal (AG-131)
- Decommissioned: 1955, at Portland, Oregon
- Reclassified: AKL-2, 31 March 1949
- Stricken: date unknown
- Identification: IMO number: 6501393; MMSI number: 367108950; Callsign: WYZ9562
- Fate: Sold, 18 December 1961
- Notes: Deal subsequently operated as a pirate radio station off the coast of England

General characteristics
- Type: Camano-class cargo ship
- Displacement: 550 tons
- Length: 177 ft (54 m)
- Beam: 33 ft (10 m)
- Draft: 10 ft (3.0 m)
- Propulsion: two 500hp GM Cleveland Division 6-278A 6-cyl V6 diesel engines, twin screws
- Speed: 12 knots
- Complement: 42 officers and enlisted
- Armament: not known

USS Deal (AG-131/AKL-2) was constructed for the U.S. Army as U.S. Army FS-263 shortly before the end of World War II and later acquired by the U.S. Navy in 1947. She was configured as a transport and cargo ship, classed by the Navy as a Camano-class cargo ship and operated with the U.S. Pacific Fleet from post-World War II and on through the end of the Korean War.

== Construction ==
FS-263 was a Design 381 (Vessel, Supply, Diesel, Steel, 177') U.S. Army Freight and Supply vessel built in 1944 for the U.S. Army by Wheeler Shipbuilding Corp., Whitestone, Long Island, New York.

== U.S. Army service ==
FS-263 was commissioned at New York on 16 August 1944 with a U.S. Coast Guard crew. The ship departed New York for the Southwest Pacific on 6 September 1944 for operations throughout the war. In August 1945 she was in New Guinea awaiting cargo for the Philippines and during the closing days of the war was in drydock at Finschhafen, New Guinea. After transit to Oro Bay, New Guinea during 15–16 August 1945 inspection revealed a cracked cylinder liner causing her to be drydocked again for repairs. The Coast Guard crew was removed and the ship was decommissioned on 12 October 1945.

== U.S. Navy service ==
The ship was acquired by the Navy 2 March 1947; and commissioned at Guam 3 August 1947. She was first classified as a Miscellaneous Auxiliary (AG) then reclassified as a Light Cargo Ship, AKL-2, 31 March 1949.

=== Pacific Fleet support ===
While based at Guam, Deal carried cargo to the small islands in the Mariana Islands, the Marshall Islands, and the Caroline Islands until arriving at Pearl Harbor 11 August 1949. She conducted cargo operations from this base to the outlying islands of the Hawaiian chain, Palmyra Atoll, and Canton Island until 16 May 1950. She sailed to Kwajalein for a brief period, returning to Pearl Harbor 3 July.

=== Korean War service ===
With the outbreak of hostilities in Korea, Deal got underway from Pearl Harbor 14 September 1950 for Sasebo, Japan, arriving 8 November. She operated as a part of the U.S. 7th Fleet under the control of Commander, Service Squadron 3, in logistics support of the United Nations forces in Korea, and visited other ports in Japan, Formosa, the Pescadores, Okinawa, and the Philippines until 28 February 1955 when she departed Yokosuka for the United States.

=== Inactivation ===
After a short visit to Long Beach, California, she arrived at Astoria Bay 13 April to start inactivation. She was placed out of commission in reserve at Portland, Oregon, 8 September 1955 and sold 18 December 1961.

== Civilian service ==
The further history of the ship's history sees her with the name of Olga Patricia and then Laissez Faire configured as a "pirate" radio ship off Essex in the United Kingdom housing 5 different radio stations from 3 May 1966 until 5 August 1967, then US court cases followed by allegations of "secret" use from 1971 in the Caribbean with the name of Akuarius II. By 1974 the ship had been sold and converted to a menhaden vessel and was named the Earl J. Conrad Junior operating for what is now the Omega Protein company which for many years operated the ship in the Chesapeake Bay area menhaden fishery. It was scrapped 2011.
