= USS Metomkin (AG-136) =

American cargo ship

History

United States
- Name: USS Metomkin
- Namesake: Metomkin Island, a barrier island off the east coast of Virginia
- Builder: John A. Mathis Co., Camden, New Jersey
- Laid down: in 1944
- Completed: as Coastal Freighter U.S. Army FS-316, date not known
- Acquired: by the U.S. Navy, 28 February 1947, at Subic Bay in the Philippines
- Commissioned: 16 August 1947 as USS Metomkin (AG-136) at Apra Harbor, Guam
- Decommissioned: 3 August 1951
- Renamed: Metomkin 3 April 1947
- Reclassified: AKL-7, 31 March 1949
- Stricken: 16 January 1952
- Fate: Transferred to the U.S. Department of the Interior, 3 August 1951, at Guam

General characteristics
- Type: Camano-class cargo ship
- Displacement: 465 tons
- Length: 177 ft (54 m)
- Beam: 32 ft (9.8 m)
- Draft: 10 ft (3.0 m)
- Propulsion: two 500hp GM Cleveland Division 6-278A 6-cyl V6 diesel engines, twin screws
- Speed: 13 knots
- Complement: 26 officers and enlisted
- Armament: two machine guns

USS Metomkin (AG-136/AKL-7) was a Camano-class cargo ship constructed for the U.S. Army as USA FS-316 shortly before the end of World War II and later acquired by the U.S. Navy in 1947. She was configured as a transport and cargo ship and was assigned to serve the World War II Trust Territories in the Pacific Ocean.

== Constructed in Camden, New Jersey ==
The first ship to be so named by the Navy, Metomkin (AG 136) was built by John A. Mathis Co., Camden, New Jersey, in 1944; operated by the Army as a freight supply ship in the Pacific Ocean during and after World War II; acquired by the Navy as FS-316 at Subic Bay, Luzon, 28 February 1947; renamed Metomkin 3 April 1947; and commissioned at Apra Harbor, Guam, 16 August 1947.

== Pacific islands operations ==
Following completion of conversion for Navy use, Metomkin began passenger and cargo shuttle duty in the central and western Pacific. Assigned to the Service Force, Pacific Fleet, she made runs to American bases in the Mariana Islands, the Marshall Islands, and the Caroline Islands.

Operating out of Apra Harbor, she completed numerous runs from the Palau Islands eastward to Pearl Harbor, and during the next 4 years she maintained a busy schedule while transporting military and civilian passengers as well as tons of general cargo. On 31 March 1949 she reclassified as AKL-7.

Metomkin continued her important logistics support duty to military bases in the Pacific until 22 June 1951 when she completed her final run from the Carolines.

== Transfer to Department of Interior ==
She decommissioned at Guam 3 August 1951 and was transferred the same day to the U.S. Department of Interior. Her name was struck from the Navy List 16 January 1952. Her subsequent fate is not known.
