= USS Hewell =

Cargo ship of the United States Navy

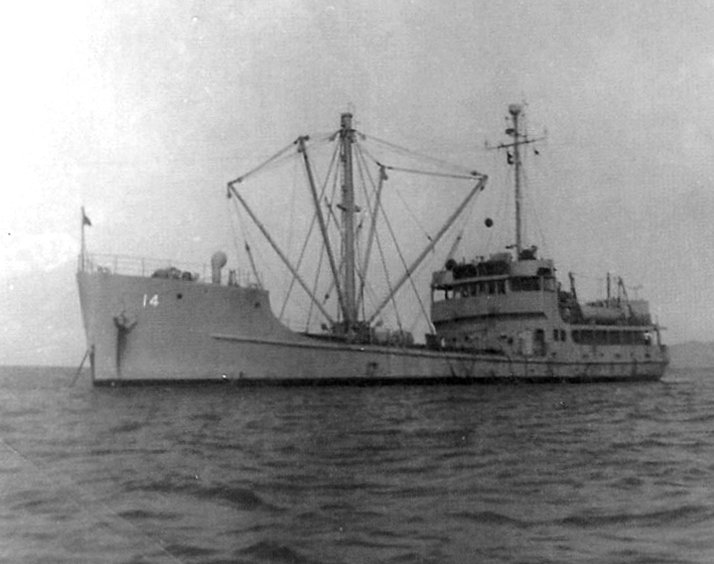
- Hewell (AKL-14) at anchor, c. 1951–53, location unknown

History

United States
- Name: USS Hewell
- Namesake: An island off the coast of Maine
- Builder: United States Concrete Pipe Corp., Los Angeles, California
- Laid down: as FS-391 for the U.S. Army (date unknown)
- Launched: 1944
- Acquired: by the U.S. Navy, 2 February 1948
- Commissioned: 5 June 1948 as USS Hewell (AG-145) at Pearl Harbor
- Decommissioned: 15 March 1955, at Astoria, Oregon
- Reclassified: AKL-14, June 1949
- Stricken: 1 November 1959
- Honours and awards: seven battle stars for Korean service
- Fate: Sold, 2 June 1960, scrapped at Lake Union, Seattle, Washington c. 1973
- Notes: was used in the movie Mister Roberts

General characteristics
- Type: Camano-class cargo ship
- Displacement: 500 tons light; 705 tons full load
- Length: 176 ft
- Beam: 32 ft
- Draft: 14 ft
- Propulsion: two 500 hp GM Cleveland Division 6-278A 6-cyl V6 diesel engines, twin screws
- Speed: 13 knots
- Complement: 26 officers and enlisted
- Armament: Two 0.5 in (12.7 mm)machine guns: One port side and one starboard side of the flying bridge.

USS Hewell (AG-145/AKL-14) was a Camano-class cargo ship constructed for the U.S. Army as FS-391 shortly before the end of World War II. FS-391 operated with a U.S. Coast Guard crew in the Southwest Pacific area. The ship was acquired by the U.S. Navy in 1948. She was configured as a transport and cargo ship and served with the U.S. Pacific Fleet – including highly decorated service during the Korean War – until decommissioned in 1955.

== U.S. Army ==
FS-391, a Design 381 (Vessel, Supply, Diesel, Steel, 177') U.S. Army Freight and Supply vessel, was launched in 1944 by United States Concrete Pipe Corp. of Los Angeles, California and commissioned at Los Angeles on 28 July 1944. She was assigned to and operated in the Southwest Pacific area.

== U.S. Navy ==
FS-391 was acquired by the Navy on 2 February 1948, modified for Naval service and classified as a miscellaneous auxiliary, commissioned as USS Hewell (AG-145) at Pearl Harbor on 5 June 1948.

Hewell's shakedown cruise initially took her across the central Pacific Ocean to Midway Islands, Guam and Saipan. Attached to the Service Force, Pacific Fleet, Hewell carried supplies between Navy bases throughout the central Pacific.

Redesignated a light cargo ship or AKL-14 in June 1949 she continued her duties of transporting cargo among the Pacific Islands, including the Caroline Islands and the Marshall Islands.

=== Korean War operations ===
After the North Korean communist attack on South Korea in June 1950 Hewell shifted her base of operations to Japan in July, from there shuttling supplies and ammunition between Japan, Okinawa and Guam to Korea. The light cargo ship returned to her normal inter-island cargo carrying routine in October, remaining on that duty until August 1951 when she sailed to Pearl Harbor for overhaul.

From November 1951 to March 1953, Hewell transported supplies and ammunition on the shuttle route from Japan and Korea, conducting an unglamorous but vital role in helping to keep UN forces in "beans and bullets". After another overhaul at Yokosuka Japan from 10 April thru 9 June 1953 the light cargo ship resumed supply runs from Japan for the troops in Korea. On 31 July 1953 the ship picked up 200 South Korean Marines in Wonsan for transport to South Korea The end of hostilities in August 1953 did not end her supply missions and Hewell remained on that duty through mid-1954. In June of that year, she made a cruise through the central Pacific island bases before arriving at Pearl Harbor in July.

=== Appearance in Mister Roberts ===
In late August, 1954, Hewell departed Hawaii for Midway Island, mooring at the Naval Base there on 28 August to make an appearance as the USS Reluctant in the Warner Brothers film Mister Roberts (1955), starring Henry Fonda, James Cagney, William Powell and Jack Lemmon. Several scenes were filmed on board Hewell, with underway footage filmed off Midway harbor between 1–16 September. The light cargo ship then sailed back to Hawaii between 24 and 29 September and additional film was shot off Kaneohe Bay between 30 September and 7 October.

Small alterations were made to the ship and a stage set built to create the "palm tree deck" and access to it. The crew in the movie is seen going below into what is actually an FS/AKL hold. Each crew member received a check for $200 and a lighter with Hewell and Mr. Roberts engraved for their appearance.

Occasional claims are made that another ship was the exterior film set for the movie; however, evidence, including the Navy's official Dictionary of American Naval Fighting Ships (DANFS), make clear that Hewell was the ship.

=== Inactivation and sale ===
Shortly thereafter, Hewell sailed east to Astoria, Oregon, remaining there until she decommissioned 15 March 1955 and joined the Columbia River Group, Pacific Reserve Fleet. Hewell remained there until 1 November 1959 when she was stricken from the Navy List and sold to Steve Pickard on 2 June 1960. The ship was scrapped at Lake Union, Seattle, Washington c. 1973.

=== Honors and awards ===
Hewell received seven battle stars for Korean service:

- North Korean Aggression
- Communist China Aggression
- Inchon Landing
- Second Korean Winter
- Korean Defense Summer-Fall 1952
- Third Korean Winter
- Korean Summer-Fall 1953

Hewell also was entitled to display the American Campaign Medal, the Asiatic-Pacific Campaign Medal, the World War II Victory Medal, the National Defense Service Medal, and the United Nations Korea Medal.
