= USS Camano =

Cargo ship of the United States Navy

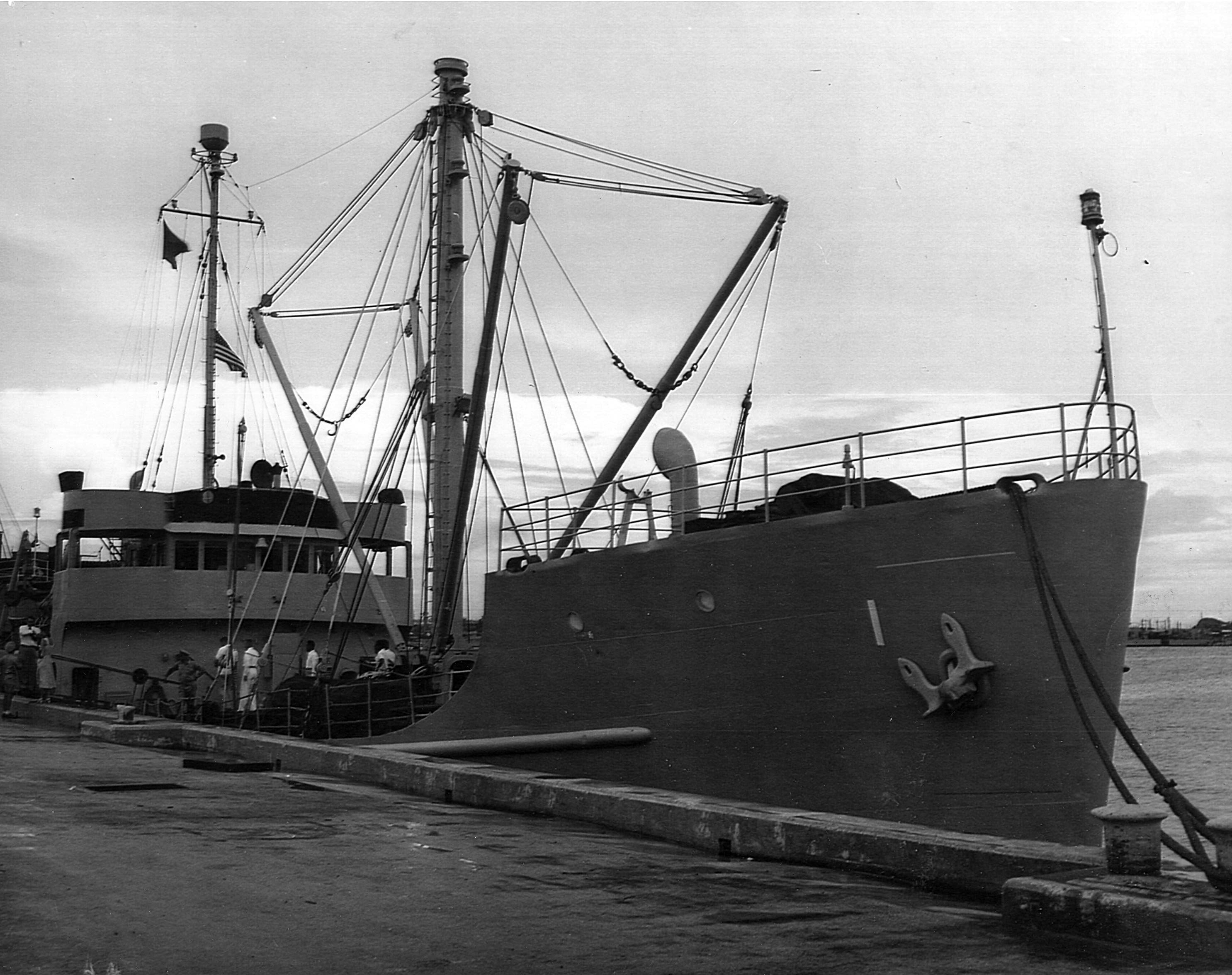
- Camano in 1951

History

United States
- Name: USS Camano
- Namesake: Camano Island in the Puget Sound, Washington
- Builder: Wheeler Shipbuilding Corporation, Whitestone, Long Island, New York
- Laid down: date unknown, as FS-256 for the U.S. Army
- Acquired: by the US Navy, 16 July 1947, at Apra Harbor, Guam, as Miscellaneous Auxiliary
- Commissioned: 16 July 1947 as USS Camano (AG-130)
- Decommissioned: 26 July 1951
- Reclassified: AKL-1, 31 March 1949
- Stricken: date unknown
- Identification: IMO number: 5338634
- Fate: fate unknown

General characteristics
- Type: Camano-class cargo ship
- Displacement: 550 tons
- Length: 177 ft
- Beam: 33 ft
- Draft: 10 ft
- Propulsion: two 500 hp GM Cleveland Division 6-278A 6-cyl V6 diesel engines, twin screws
- Speed: 12 knots
- Complement: 42 officers and enlisted
- Armament: Two 0.5 in (12.7 mm) machines guns, one on Port and one on Starboard side of flying bridge.

USS Camano (AG-130/AKL-1) was an Army Design 381 coastal freighter acquired by the United States Navy 16 July 1947 at Apra Harbor, Guam and became the lead ship of her class of cargo ship. She was configured as a Navy transport and cargo ship and operated with the U.S. Pacific Fleet until 1951, when she was turned over to the U.S. Department of the Interior.

== History ==
FS-256 was constructed as a Design 381 coastal freighter by Wheeler Shipbuilding, Whitestone NY for the U.S. Army as FS-256 in 1944 and delivered in 1945. FS-256 was a Coast Guard-staffed Army vessel until the end of World War II. She left New York 16 June 1944 for the Southwest Pacific. The Army vessel was decommissioned on 14 October 1945.

FS-256 was acquired by the Navy at Apra Harbor, Guam, 16 July 1947; renamed Camano and commissioned the same day. First designated as Miscellaneous Auxiliary with the designation of AG-130 the ship underwent conversion to Navy specifications until 8 October 1947. Camano began cargo and passenger duty out of Guam to the Caroline Islands. She was reclassified as a Light Cargo Ship to become AKL-1, the class lead, on 31 March 1949.

On 2 June 1949 she sailed to Pearl Harbor for overhaul, then resumed duty at Guam on 24 September and remained there, except for another overhaul at Pearl Harbor, until 26 July 1951. On that date, she was decommissioned and transferred to the U.S. Department of the Interior. Camano was returned to the Navy 22 December 1952. She was struck from the Navy List at an unknown date. She then served for an unknown amount of time as a cargo ship. From January 1974 to December 1974, she was named Star 60, and afterwards was named Rio Chagres. Her final fate is not known.
