= Metompkin Island =

Island off the coast of Virginia

Coordinates: 37°45′08″N 75°32′41″W

Metompkin Island (sometimes pluralized, Metompkin Islands, and sometimes Metomkin) is a barrier island off the east coast of Virginia in the United States. It is located in Accomack County. Metompkin Island is highly-migratory, meaning that it is moving over time due to erosion and deposition effects. Because of this movement, the island has at times been one landmass and at others two larger islands with numerous small islets surrounding them.

A proposed United States Navy seaplane tender, USS Metomkin (AVP-47), was to have been named for Metomkin Island, but the ship was cancelled in 1943 before construction could begin. However, a U.S. Navy cargo ship, USS Metomkin (AG-136), in commission from 1947 to 1951, did carry the island's name.

== See also ==
- Metompkin, Virginia
