= Auxiliary floating drydock =

Type of United States Navy drydocks

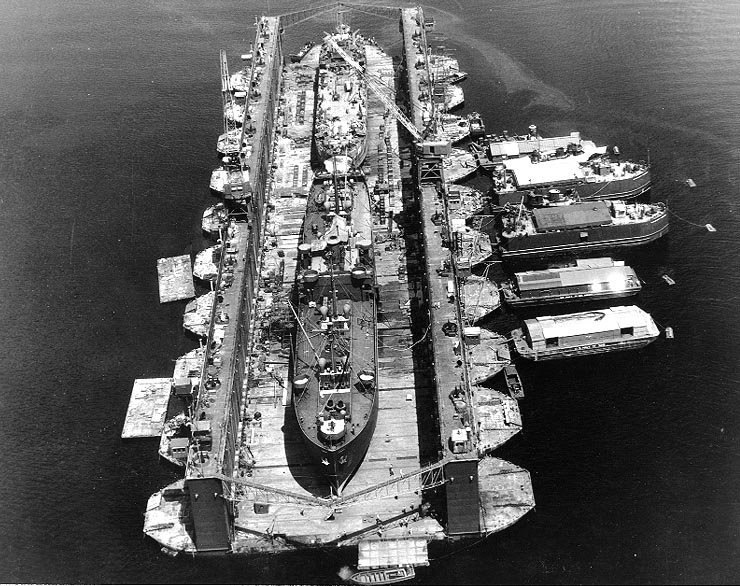
USS Artisan (ABSD-1) with USS Antelope (IX-109) and LST-120 in the dock at Espiritu Santo, New Hebrides Islands, 8 January 1945

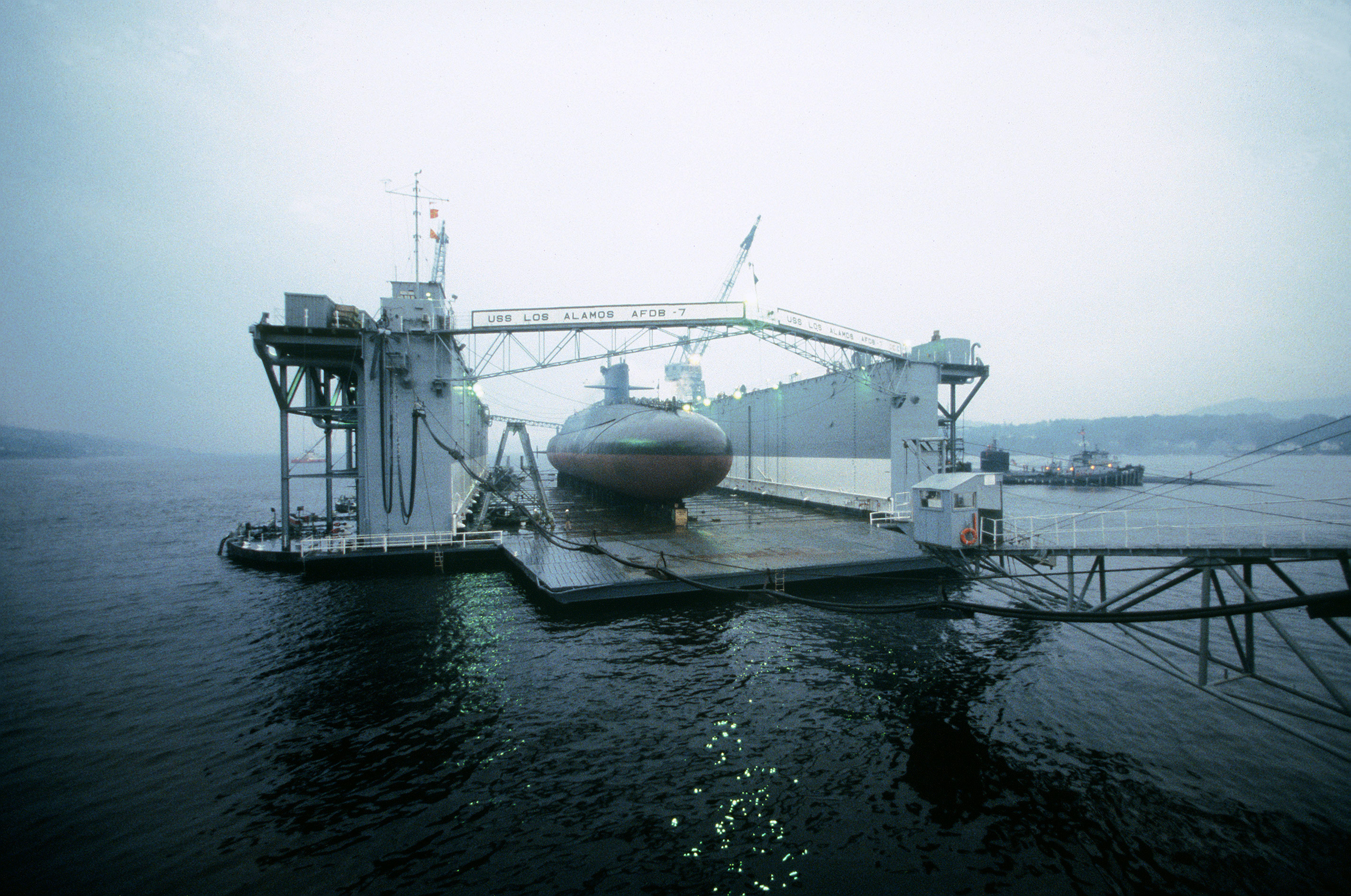
Los Alamos (AFDB-7), with a repaired submarine at Holy Loch, Scotland in 1985

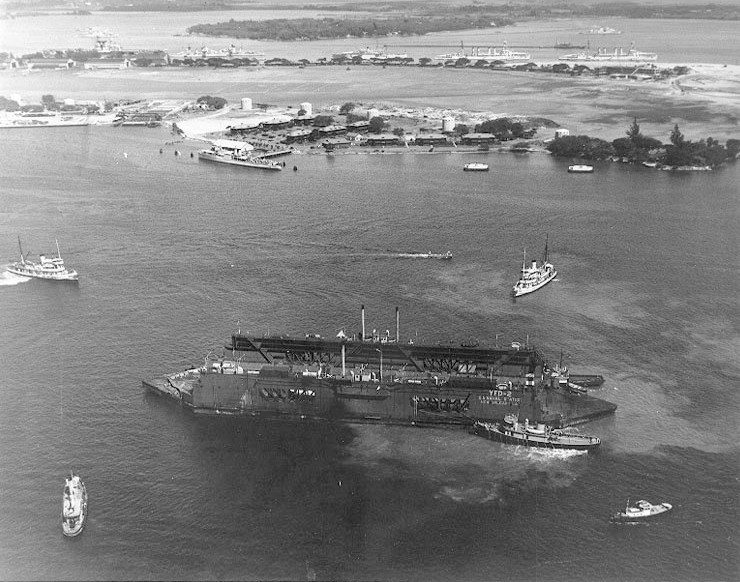
YFD-2 The first Yard Floating Dock built in 1901, arriving Pearl Harbor 23 October 1940 from New Orleans Naval Yard

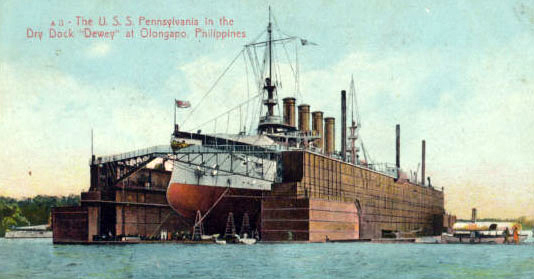
USS Pennsylvania in drydock USS Dewey, the second YFD, c. 1906–1907

A floating drydock is a type of ship repair facility that has been used since at least the early 19th century. It was adopted for widespread use by the US Navy in the early 20th century as a critical element in the Service Force that was being conceived to provide support for the fleet in an expected war with Japan. A floating drydock is generally a trough-shaped construction larger than a ship which incorporates ballast tanks under its floor and in its sidewalls. When a ship needs repair the ballast tanks are flooded, lowering the structure into the water to a depth at which its floor is deeper underwater than the bottom of the ship to be repaired. The ship is then maneuvered into a position between the sidewalls and over the floor of the dock, at which point the tanks are pumped out again, lifting the floor of the structure back out of the water, with the ship perched on a series of supports carefully positioned to match the contour of its underside. This leaves the vessel perched securely out of the water so that work on its underside can be undertaken.

== Concept (U. S. Navy) ==
All ships, but particularly naval vessels in continuous use during wartime, need periodic maintenance (such as cleaning of barnacles and seaweed off of hulls, and repainting) and repairs (of battle damage, or of damage resulting from collisions, groundings, or other types of accident) below the waterline. Such work often requires dry docking. Since before World War I American plans for a Pacific war had called for a movement across the central Pacific by amphibious forces, who would capture strategically placed territories and establish advance bases there. Ultimately, when this string of bases reached points close enough to Japanese home territory, bombing aircraft would be sent to the farthest forward of the bases and used to prosecute war against the Japanese home islands, a task that would require significant logistical support in and of itself. This was an unprecedented type of warfare, because of the lengths of supply lines dictated by the distances involved, and the quantities of supplies that would be necessary to support such a massive offensive so far from home. Ships involved in the advance would require maintenance and repairs. It was recognized at an early date that, to minimize the need to send ships in need of such servicing all the way back to North America, it would make sense to equip these newly established advance bases with the most comprehensive repair facilities that could be set up in faraway locations in short order. The provision of dry docks for these faraway bases was going to be necessary, and in 1920 the Navy began to develop a number of types of floating dry dock, of various sizes, that would be suitable for towing across long distances. Construction of such drydocks was begun on a large scale in 1940.

At the start of World War II, the US Navy had only three steel floating dry docks:

1. YFD-2, built in 1901, was stationed at Pearl Harbor. The destroyer USS Shaw was being repaired in the dock on 7 December 1941 during the attack on the harbor. Both YFD-2 and USS Shaw were repaired, after being hit and damaged in the attack.
2. USS Dewey, built in 1905, had been deployed to the Philippines through most of its career. It was scuttled at Mariveles to prevent its capture by the Japanese. In 1942 Japan raised the Dewey, but it was resunk by US forces.
3. ARD-1, built in 1933, was also at Pearl Harbor. It was a self-sustaining mobile dry dock.

By the end of the war the Navy had either built or acquired from private owners a total of 155 docks of varying types and sizes. Between 1 October 1944 and 17 October 1945, 7,000 ships were repaired in these docks.

== General Characteristics ==
The newly built floating dry docks had lift capacities ranging between 400 and 100,000 tons. While most floating drydocks were made of steel, considerable numbers were made of concrete or timber instead. Timber floating dry docks had lift capacities of anywhere from 400 to 20,000 tons. They were not meant to be towed across the open ocean and were not given a US Navy class designation.

Docks come in different sizes to accommodate ships of different sizes; while most, including the earliest examples, are built as a single unit, the largest, designed to accommodate the largest ships, are too large to be moved across open ocean as a single unit, and are therefore built in sections which can be transported individually and assembled at their work site.

Most floating drydocks had no propulsion system of their own, and therefore had to be towed to their destinations. Most incorporated power stations, ballast pumps, repair shops, and machine shops, and many had cranes. Most incorporated quarters, mess halls, and other accommodations for their own crews, to make them as self-sustaining as possible, and thereby minimize the need for support vessels or additional facilities ashore. Some also had accommodations for crews of the ship under repair, although most of the time the crew of the damaged ship remained on board their own ship while repairs were done.

Most auxiliary floating drydocks were armed with 40 mm and/or 20 mm anti-aircraft guns for defense. Japanese pilots sometimes mistook empty auxiliary floating drydocks for aircraft carriers.

After World War II some auxiliary floating dry docks were sold for private use and others were scrapped.

== List of Types and Docks ==
Myriad designations were applied to the different types of drydock built under this program. Post-war, to rationalize the system of designations, most drydocks were redesignated as Auxiliary Floating Drydocks, with Big (AFDBs), Medium (AFDMs), and Light (or Little; AFDLs) subsets. A few other designations (two Medium Auxiliary Repair Docks [ARDMs], of post-war origin, in active service, and several Auxiliary Repair Docks [ARDs] and Auxiliary Repair Docks, Concrete [ARDCs], sold into private or foreign service and possibly available for U. S. Navy use) are also still in use, for docks that do not quite meet the parameters of any of the AFD categories.

=== Auxiliary Floating Docks, Big (AFDBs) (Previously Advanced Base Sectional Docks (ABSDs)) ===
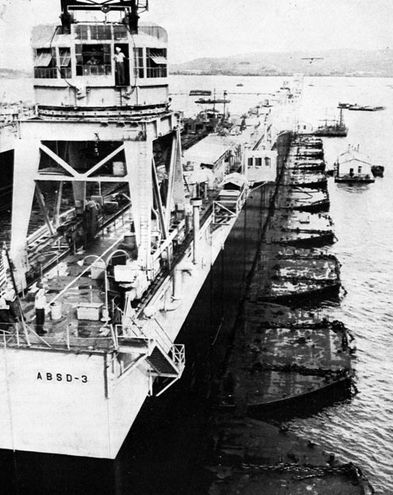
USS AFDB-3 with rail traveling 15-ton crane

The largest floating drydocks built for the Navy during World War II were two classes initially categorized as Advanced Base Sectional Docks (ABSDs). These docks were built in multiple sections for towing to the locations where they would be used; the sections were then assembled, side by side, to produce a single structure capable of accommodating ships nearly 1,000 feet long. Post-war the ABSDs were redesignated as Auxiliary Floating Dry Docks, Big (AFDBs).

The larger of the two classes, of which three (ABSD-1 through ABSD-3) were built, were made up of ten individual sections, oval-shaped pontoons that measured 256 feet (78 m) in length (from the tip of one roughly semicircular end to the other) and 80 feet (24.4 m) in width. The pontoons were 28 feet (8.5 m) thick (deep), with plating roughly 5 1/2 inches (14 cm) thick forming the upper and lower surfaces. Each pontoon incorporated 12 flotation tanks within its structure, flanking a 36-foot (11-m) wide, 80-foot (24.3-m) long vacant space, which contained accommodations for enlisted personnel on an upper floor, and storage compartments beneath, running widthwise across its center. Each pontoon supported two sidewalls, 80 feet (24.3 m) long (spanning the width of the pontoon), 55 feet (16.7 m) high, and 20 feet (6.1 m) thick. The sidewalls were spaced 137 feet, 6 inches (42 m) apart (inner surface to inner surface), with their outer edges at roughly the points where the curves of the semicircular ends began. The sidewalls could be folded down, to lie across the center of the pontoon, and then the whole segment could be towed, with the rounded ends fore and aft, at a reasonable speed. Fittings for anti-aircraft guns were located on the outer sides of the walls, so that such weapons could be mounted on top while the section was being towed. The crew generally travelled aboard the dock sections.

Upon reaching the destination the walls were raised and the pontoons joined together, side by side, with the semicircular ends of each pontoon projecting out beyond the walls, adding to lateral stability. Assembled, the core of the structure was 827 feet (252 m) long (80 feet [24 m] for each pontoon, with 3-foot [1-m] gaps left between each unit and the one next to it). Sources report that a 50-foot (15-m) long section of some sort was appended to each end of the assembled structure, giving an overall 927-foot (283-m) length to the structure; no readily available source gives a clear idea of what these extensions amounted to, although photos suggest that they may have been shelf-like structures that did not extend down even to the water's surface, much less supply any buoyancy. Flooding of ballast tanks incorporated into the pontoons could lower the deck to a depth of some 49 feet (15 m) below surface, so that a ship to be worked on could be maneuvered into a position over the pontoons and between the walls, with the ballast tanks then being pumped out, raising the pontoons back to the surface and leaving the ship perched atop carefully arrayed blocks set up on the pontoons' upper surfaces.

The smaller class of ABSD, of which four (ABSD 4 through 7) were built, was structured similarly to the larger class, but incorporated only seven pontoons, each 240 feet (73 m) long and 100 feet (30.5 m) wide, with 49-foot (15-m) high, 18-foot (5.5-m) thick sidewalls spaced 120 feet (36.5 m) apart (internal surface to internal surface). The decks of these structures could be submerged to a depth of approximately 44 feet (13.4 m) below surface. Overall length of the assembled dock was approximately 820 feet (250 m).

AFDBs had crews of 600 to 1,000 men. They were equipped with fresh-water distilling plants and, perched on a rail atop one of the sidewalls, a 15-ton-capacity crane with an 85-foot (26-m) reach. To pump water from the ballast tanks, on each section there were two 24-inch (61 cm) discharge pumps, each of which could pump 15,000 US gallons (57,000 L) per minute, powered by a steam plant. For electricity, there were two 350-kw diesel AC generators on each section, producing 3-phase 60-cycle power at 440 volts. Each section could store 65,000 US gallons (250,000 L) of fuel oil to supply the ships under repair. Crews lived in barracks ships, called APLs, that docked next to the AFDB, as didtwo or more support bargess.

- USS Artisan (ABSD-1) (A-J), built by Everett-Pacific and others
- USS AFDB-2 (A-J), built by Mare Island Naval Shipyard in Vallejo, California (E, F, H & I in use)
- USS AFDB-3 (A-I), saw fighting action in Guam, and was sold to Croatia in 2000.
- USS AFDB-4 (A-G), built by Mare Island Naval Ship Yard (NSY). Attacked by air on April 27, 1945. Partially sunk 1989 as a reef.
- USS AFDB-5 (A-G), built by Chicago Bridge in Morgan City, Louisiana. Scrapped in 1997.
- USS AFDB-6 (A-G), built by Mare Island NSY. Scrapped 1976.
- USS Los Alamos (AFDB-7) (A-G), built by Chicago Bridge. Sold to a private shipyard in 1995.

Post WW2

- AFDB-8 Machinist, built by Seebeckwerft in Germany. Sold to Guam in 1997.
- AFDB-9 (A-B), built by Sun Shipbuilding in Chester, Pennsylvania. Sold to private owners in Galveston in 1985.

=== Auxiliary Floating Docks, Medium (AFDM)(previously Yard Floating Docks (YFDs)) ===
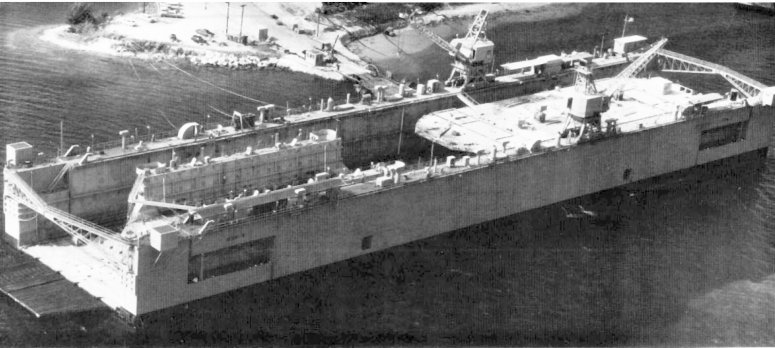
USS Richland (YFD-64)

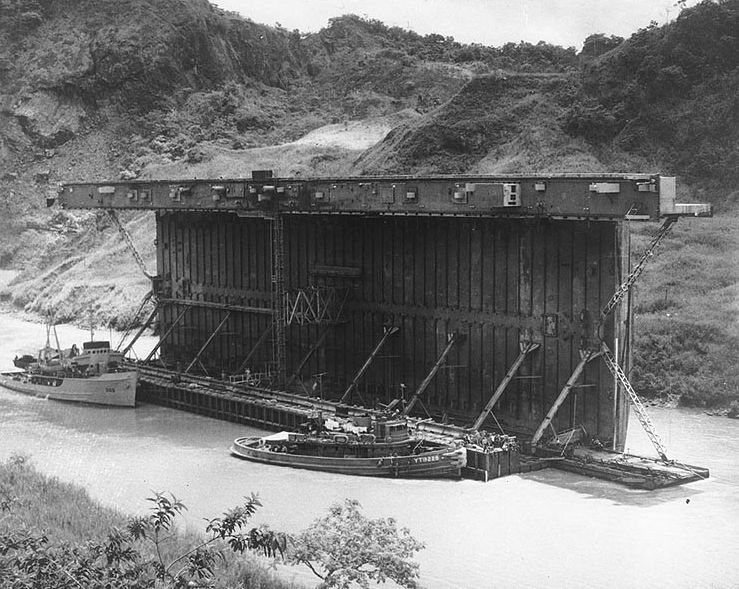
YFD-6 center section floated through the Panama Canal on its side. Towed by USS Alarka (YTB-229) (center) and USS Umpqua (ATA-209) (left) in 1945. Navy SeaBees turned it on its side with many pontoons to fit through the canal

More than half of all floating drydocks built for the United States Navy were initially classified as Yard Floating Docks (YFDs). This term was a catch-all, and did not describe any particular type of dock: docks with lifting capacities ranging from 400 to 20,000 tons, made of metal, concrete, or wood, were all designated under this category. Post-war, however, 14 large units with relatively uniform characteristics were redesignated as Auxiliary Floating Docks, Medium (AFDM). These docks were all of metal construction, and were constructed in three sections, a large central section with shorter sections appended to each end. They displace between 6,800 and 8,000 tons and measure between 528 and 622 ft (161 and 190 m) in length. Their structures incorporate 16 ballast tanks, and have lift capacities of c.18,000 tons, sufficient to lift a cruiser or nuclear submarine. They are equipped with two 7 1/2-ton cranes, mounted on the upper edges of the two side walls. In wartime they were armed with two 40 mm and four 20 mm guns. Unlike most YFDs, these docks were relatively transportable.

- USS AFDM-1 Chicago Bridge, YFD 3. Was floated through the Panama Canal on it side, and scrapped in 1986.
- USS AFDM-2 Alabama DD, YFD 4. Sold to private users in 1999.
- USS AFDM-3 Chicago Bridge, through the Panama Canal on it side to Naval Base Trinidad, YFD 6. Sold to private users.
- USS AFDM-4 Chicago Bridge, YFD 10. Sold to private users in 1948.
- USS Resourceful (AFDM-5) Everett-Pacific, YFD 21. Sold to private users in 1999.
- USS Competent (AFDM-6) Everett-Pacific, YFD 62. Sold to private users in 1997.
- USS Sustain (AFDM-7) Everett-Pacific, YFD 63. Leased to BAE Systems Southeast Shipyards in 1997.
- USS Richland (AFDM-8) Chicago Bridge, YFD 64, scrapped in 2016
- USS AFDM-9 Chicago Bridge, YFD 65. Sold to private users in 1989.
- USS Resolute (AFDM-10) Chicago Bridge, YFD 67. Destroyed in 1947.
- USS AFDM-11 Chicago Bridge, YFD 68. Sold to private users in 2004.
- USS AFDM-12 – Kaiser Shipyards in Vancouver, Washington, YFD 69. Scrapped in 1990.
- USS AFDM-13 – See YFD 70 Columbia Const. in Vancouver, WA. Sold to private users in 1969.
- USS Steadfast (AFDM-14)
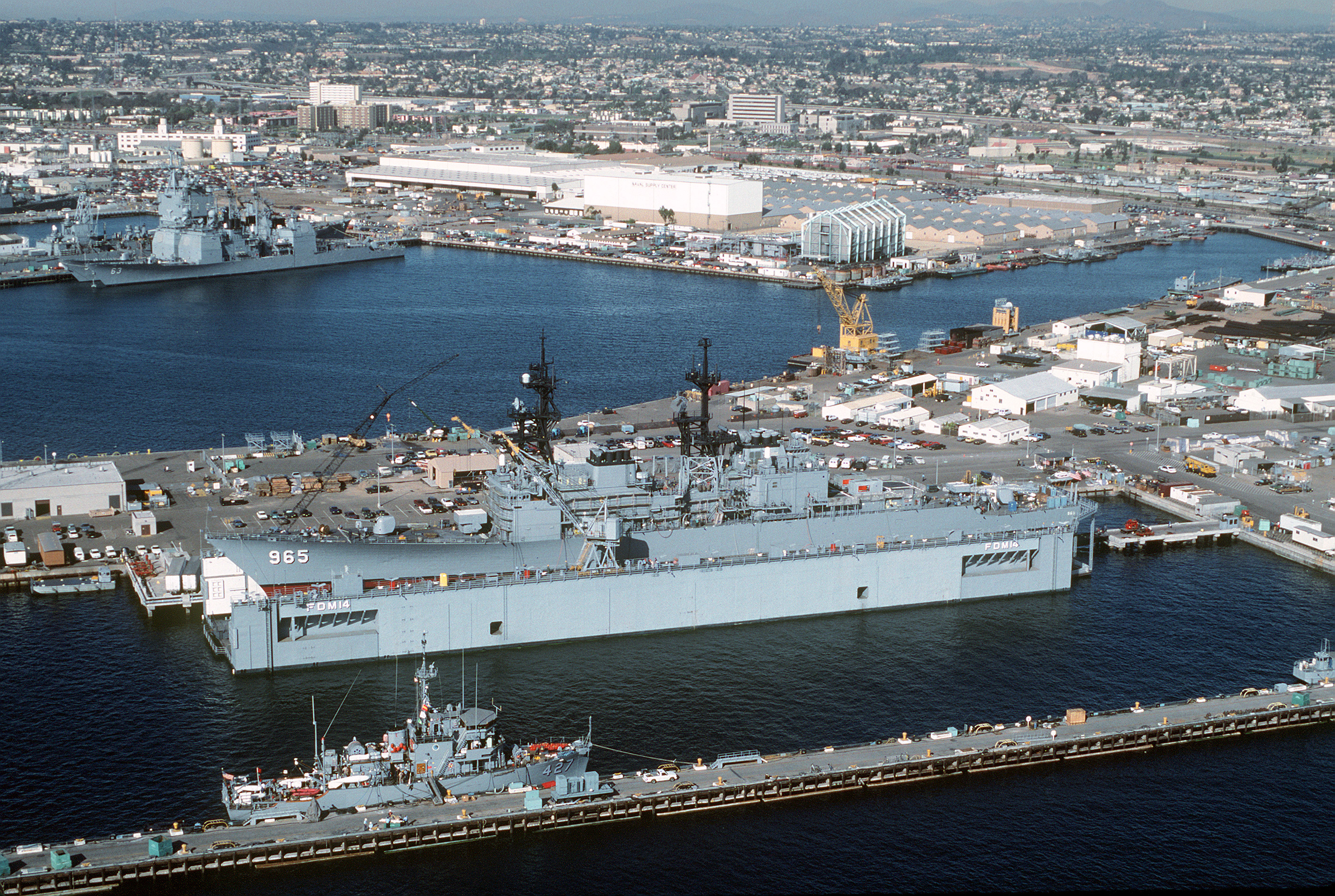
  USS Kinkaid (DD-965) in floating drydock Steadfast
  Pollock-Stockton in Stockton, California, YFD 71. Sold to private users in 1998.

=== Auxiliary Floating Docks, Little (AFDLs)(previously Auxiliary Floating Docks (AFDs) and Auxiliary Repair Docks (ARDs)) ===
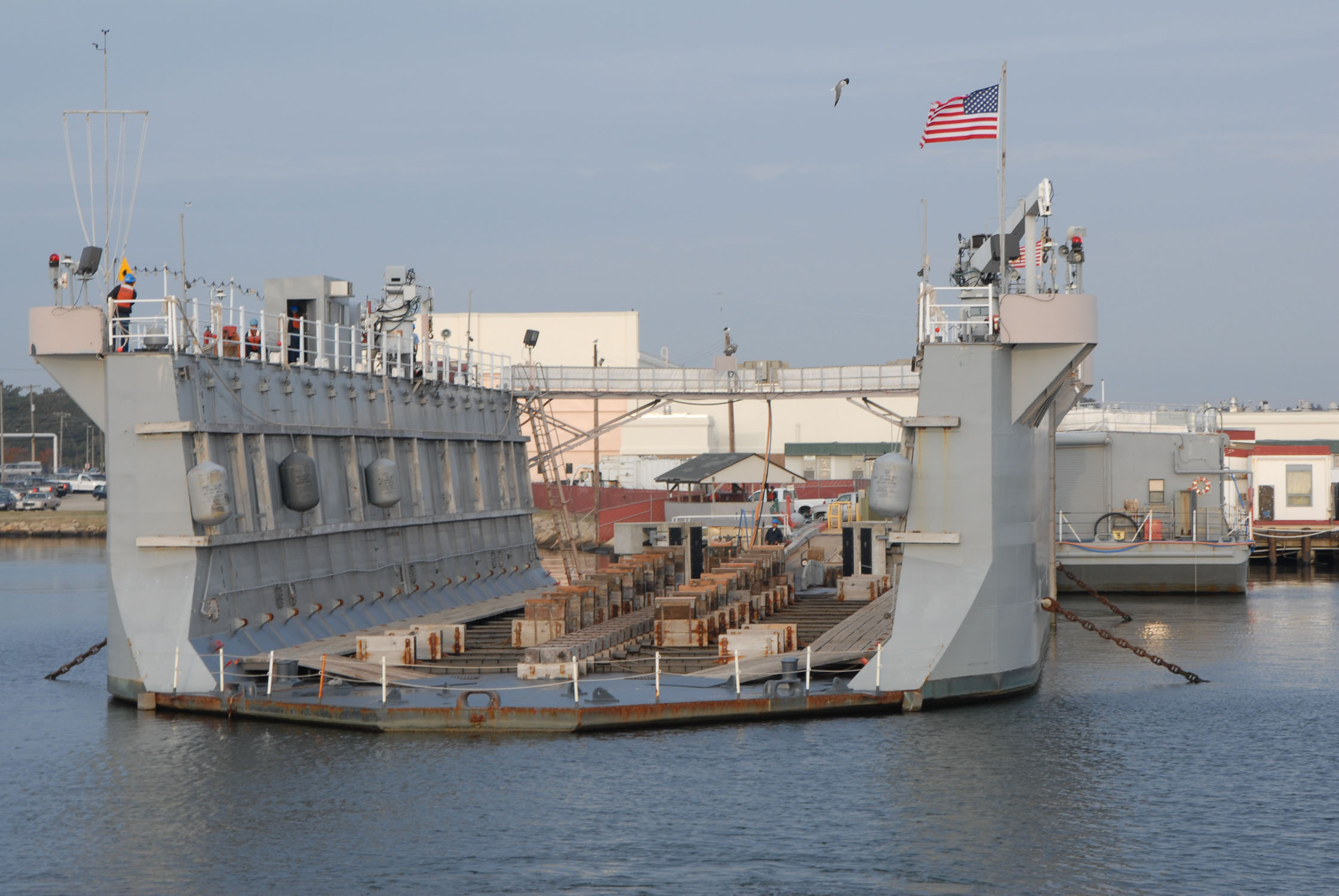
USS Dynamic (AFD-6) at Virginia Beach, Va. on Nov. 2, 2006

==== Auxiliary Floating Docks (AFDs)/Auxiliary Floating Docks, Lengthened (AFDLs) ====
The term Auxiliary Floating Dock (AFD) was initially applied to small, single-unit docks, 200 ft (61 m) long, with a beam of 64 ft (20 m) and a draft of 14.5 ft (4.4 m) over the blocks when submerged. Open at both ends, they were capable of lifting vessels displacing no more than 1000 tons, such as minesweepers, patrol vessels, and yard utility vessels. When slightly larger vessels began to be built (notably destroyer-escorts), it was decided to take five of the AFDs (AFD-7, AFD-12, AFD-22, AFD-23, and AFD-26) and lengthen them by 88 feet (26.8 m), raising displacement to 1,200 tons and lifting capacity to 1,900 tons. These five docks became known as Auxiliary Floating Docks, Lengthened (AFDLs). All these vessels were self-contained, carrying their own power generating equipment, and were assigned crews of 60.

Somewhat confusingly, all AFDs and AFDLs were reclassified as AFDLs, now meaning "Auxiliary Floating Docks, Little" (AFDL), in 1946.

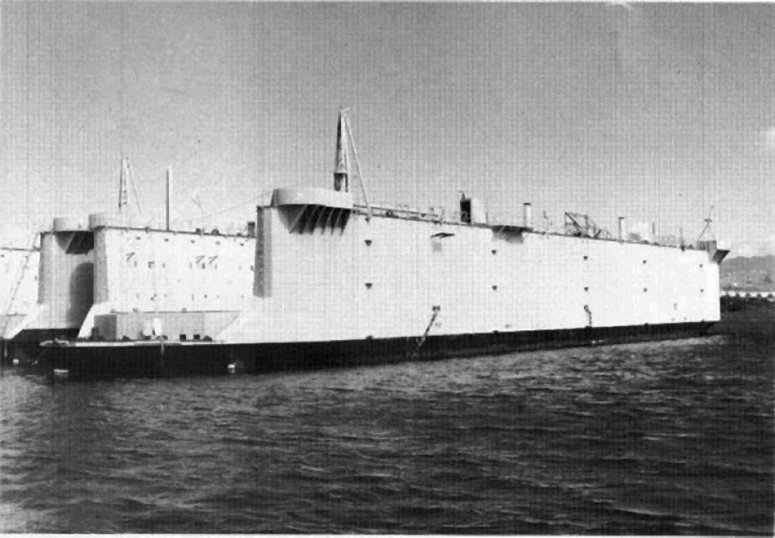
USS Adept (AFD-23)

- USS Endeavor AFD-1/AFDL-1 By Chicago Bridge
- USS AFD-2 By Chicago Bridge
- USS AFD-3/AFDL-3 By Chicago Bridge
- USS AFD-4/AFDL-4 By Chicago Bridge
- USS AFD-5/AFDL-5 By Chicago Bridge
- USS Dynamic (AFD-6)/AFDL-6 By Chicago Bridge
- USS Ability (AFD-7)/AFDL-7 By Chicago Bridge
- USS AFD-8/AFDL-8 By Chicago Bridge
- USS AFD-9/AFDL-9 By Chicago Bridge, stationed at Naval Base Noumea
- USS AFD-10/AFDL-10 By Chicago Bridge
- USS AFD-11/AFDL-11 By Chicago Bridge
- USS AFD-12/AFDL-12
- USS AFD-13/AFDL-13 Typhoon Ida Sank off of Okinawa, Japan on 16 September 1945.
- USS AFD-14/AFDL-14 served Espiritu Santo.
- USS AFD-15/AFDL-15 served at Enewetak Atoll
- USS AFD-16/AFDL-16
- USS AFD-17/AFDL-17 served at Kwajalein Atoll
- USS AFD-18/AFDL-18
- USS AFD-19/AFDL-19 By The Auchter Company served in Dunstaffnage a Scottish village, sold moved to Jacksonville, Florida
- USS AFD-20/AFDL-20 By Auchter Company served American Samoa
- USS AFD-21/AFDL-21 By Auchter Company
- USS AFD-22/AFDL-22 By Auchter Company
- USS Adept (AFD-23)/AFDL-23 Auchter Company
- USS AFD-24/AFDL-24 By Doullot & Ewin in Mobile, Alabama
- USS AFD-25/AFDL-25 By Doullot & Ewin
- USS AFD-26/AFDL-26 By Doullot & Ewin
- USS AFD-27/AFDL-27 By Doullot & Ewin
- USS AFD-28/AFDL-28 By Doullot & Ewin
- USS AFD-29/AFDL – AFDL-29 By Doullot & Ewin
- USS AFD-30/AFDL-30 By Foundation Co. Scrapped in 1979.
- USS AFD-31/AFDL-31 By Foundation Co. Later YFD 83. To US Coast Guard 1947. After war moved to Singapore.
- USS AFD-32/AFDL-32 By Foundation Co.
- USS AFD-33/AFDL-33 By Foundation Co. To Peru 1959 as AFD 106. Active.
- For AFDL-34 to AFDL-46 see: Auxiliary Repair Dock, Concrete

==== Auxiliary Repair Docks (ARDs) ====
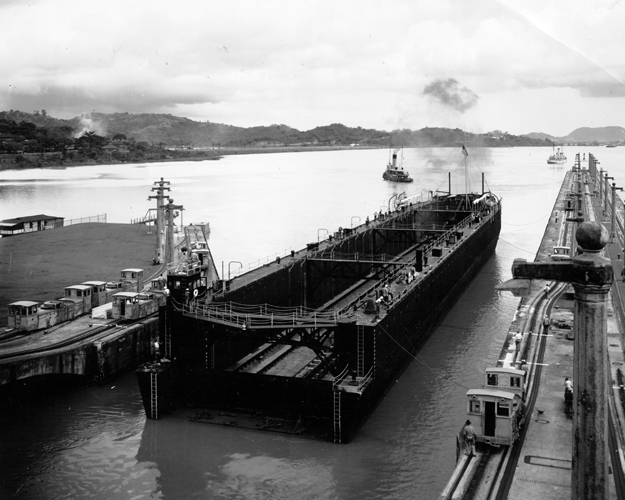
USS ARD-1 under tow by USS Bridge 28 October 1934

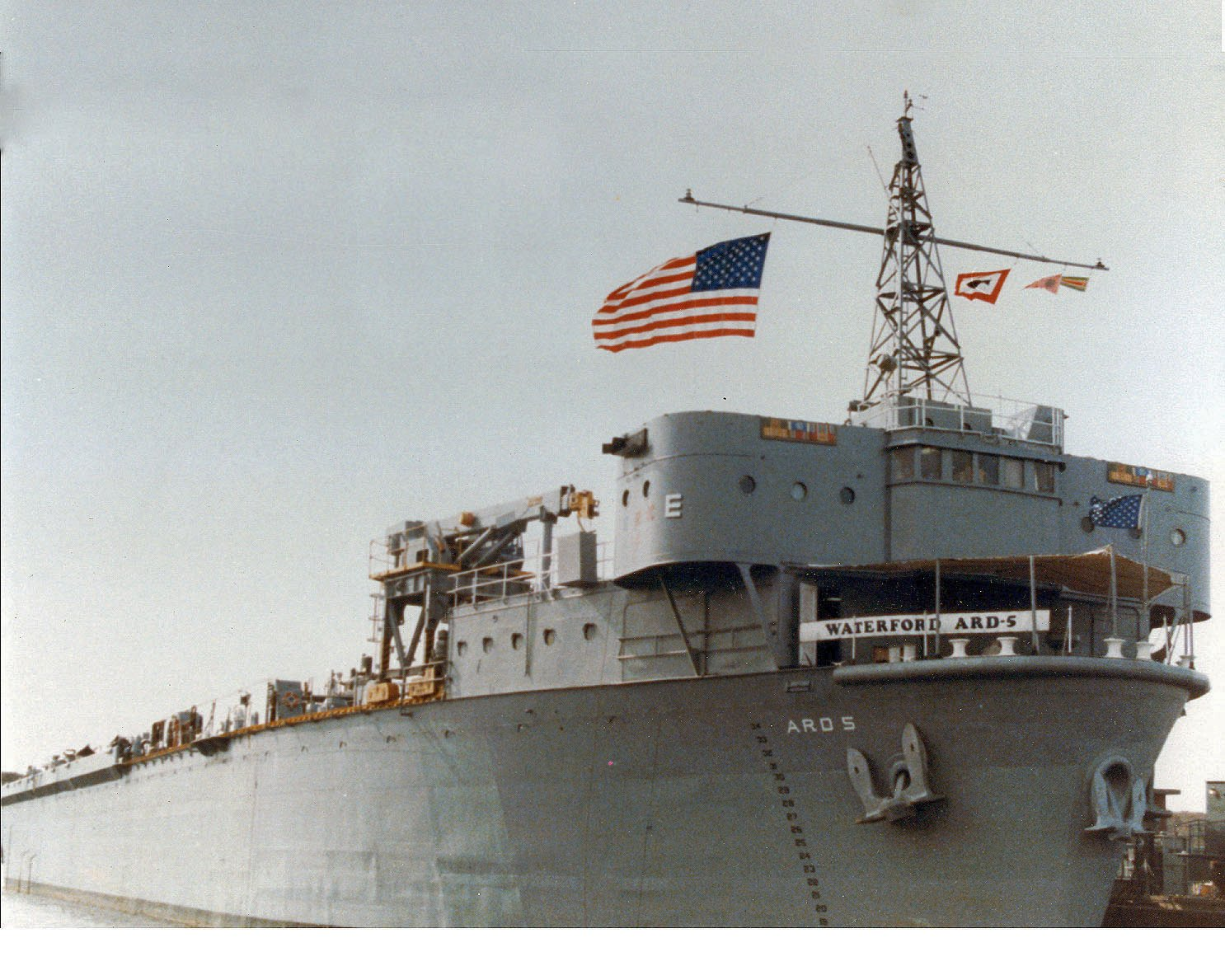
USS Waterford (ARD-5)

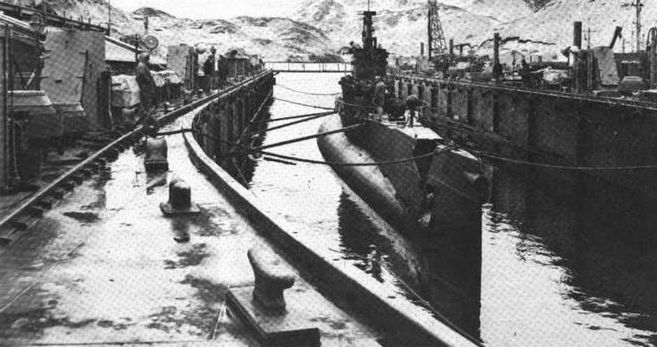
ARD-6 submerged at Dutch Harbor, Alaska with Sub USS S-46 for repair 1944

Auxiliary Repair Docks (ARDs) are eminently towable structures, with enclosed, ship-like bows and rudders at the stern to improve their towing characteristics. Their sterns are open, to allow vessels to be worked on to be taken aboard. They measure (external dimensions, with some variance between different subclasses) 483 ft (147 m) in length and 71 ft (22 m) in beam, displace 4,800 tons, and draw 5 ft (1.5 m) when the ballast tanks are empty; their usable (internal) space measures 413 feet by 49 feet 4 inches, and they can be submerged to a depth of 21 feet above the top of the blocks on which ships being serviced are perched. With a nominal lifting capacity of 3,500 tons they were, during the war, appropriate for use in repairing destroyers, submarines, Landing Ship, Tanks (LSTs), and other small- to medium-sized vessels. The docks were armed with two single Oerlikon 20 mm cannons for anti-aircraft work. They have two five-ton-capacity cranes perched atop their side walls. A stowage barge is assigned as an auxiliary to the dock. The crew consists of 6 officers and 125 enlisted men. All ARDs were built by Pacific Bridge Company of Alameda, California.

- USS ARD-1 Displacement of 2,200 tons. Built in 1933. Only one in class.
- USS ARD-2 stationed at Naval Base Noumea Sold in 1963.
- USS ARD-3 Sold in 1999.
- USS ARD-4 Sold in 1961.
  - ARD-2-class 410 ft (120 m) long, 49 ft 4 in (15.04 m) wide, ARD-5 to 11:
- USS Waterford (ARD-5)
- USS ARD-6 Sold in 1961.
- USS West Milton (ARD-7) Scrapped in 1992.
- USS ARD-8 Sold in 1961.
- USS ARD-9 Sold 1977
- USS ARD-10 Sold, scrapped in 2014
- USS ARD-11 Sold 1977
  - ARD-2-class wide: 410 ft (120 m), 49 ft 4 in (15.04 m) to 59 ft 3 in (18.06 m) wide, ARD 12 to 32:
- USS ARD-12 Sold in 1987.
- USS ARD-13 Sold in 1977.
- USS ARD-14 Sold in 1980.
- USS ARD-15 Sold in 1971.
- USS ARD-16 By Pacific Bridge. Sold and moved to Mobile, AL.
- USS ARD-17 Sold in 1971.
- USS Endurance ARD-18 ARDM 3. Laid up at Charleston Naval Shipyard.
- USS Oak Ridge ARD-19 ARDM 1. To United States Coast Guard in 2002.
- USS White Sands ARD-20 By Pacific Bridge Co., (changed to AGDS-1). Sold in 1974.
- USS ARD-21 Reserve
- USS Windsor (ARD-22) Sold in 1976
- USS ARD-23 Transferred to Argentine Navy in 1961, redesignated ARA Y-1. Sold in 1991
- USS ARD-24 Sold in 1982.
- USS ARD-25 Sold in 1973.
- USS Alamogordo ARD-26 Sold in 2000.
- USS ARD-27 Scrapped in 1974.
- USS ARD-28 Sold and renamed Capitan Rodriguez Zamora.
- USS Arco (ARD-29) Sold to Iran in 1971.
- USS San Onfre (ARD-30) By Pacific Bridge Co.
- USS ARD-31 To US Air Force in 1974.
- USS ARD-32 Sold in 1960.
- USS ARD-33 By Dravo Corp. Renamed AFDL 47 Reliance.

=== Medium Auxiliary Repair Docks (ARDMs) ===
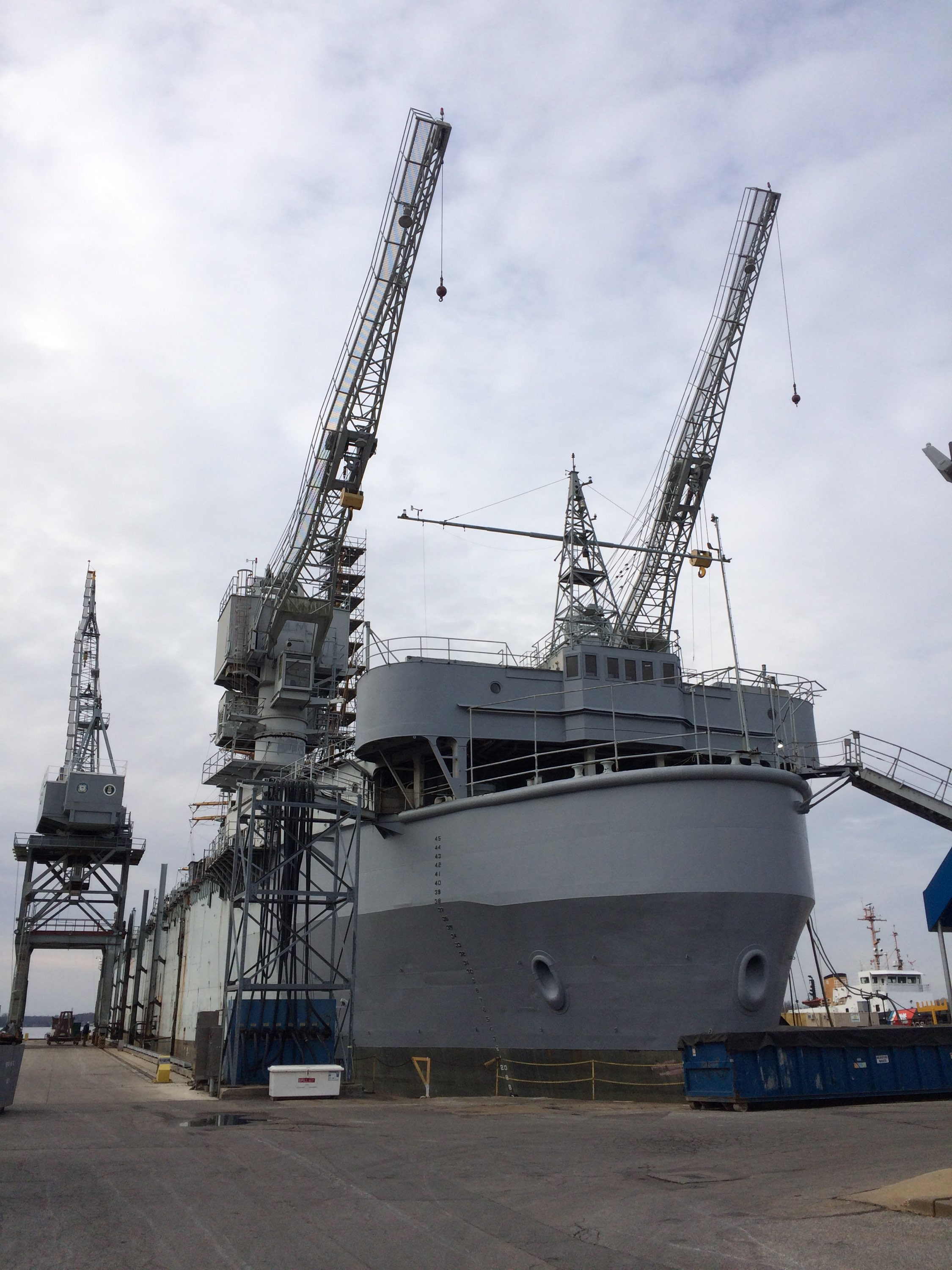
USS Oak Ridge (ARDM-1)

Three Auxiliary Repair Docks (ARDs) built during World War II were rebuilt post-war, being lengthened by 50 feet (15 m) and having their sidewalls raised slightly in height. These were reclassified as Medium Auxiliary Repair Dry Docks (ARDMs). Two additional docks in this category were built in 1977 and 1983, respectively.

- USS Oak Ridge (originally ARD-19) by Pacific Bridge Company. Lengthened, becoming ARDM-1, 1963. Now in US Coast Guard.
  - USS Alamogordo (originally ARD-26) by Pacific Bridge, Lengthened, becoming ARDM-2, 1965. Now in Ecuador.
  - USS Endurance (ARD-18) by Pacific Bridge, Lengthened, becoming ARDM-3, 1967-68. Now in South America.
  - Post WW2
  - USS Shippingport (ARDM-4) by Bethlehem Steel, US Navy Active.
  - USS Arco (ARDM-5) by Todd Pacific Shipyards in Seattle WA, US Navy Active.

=== Auxiliary Repair Docks, Concrete (ARDCs) ===
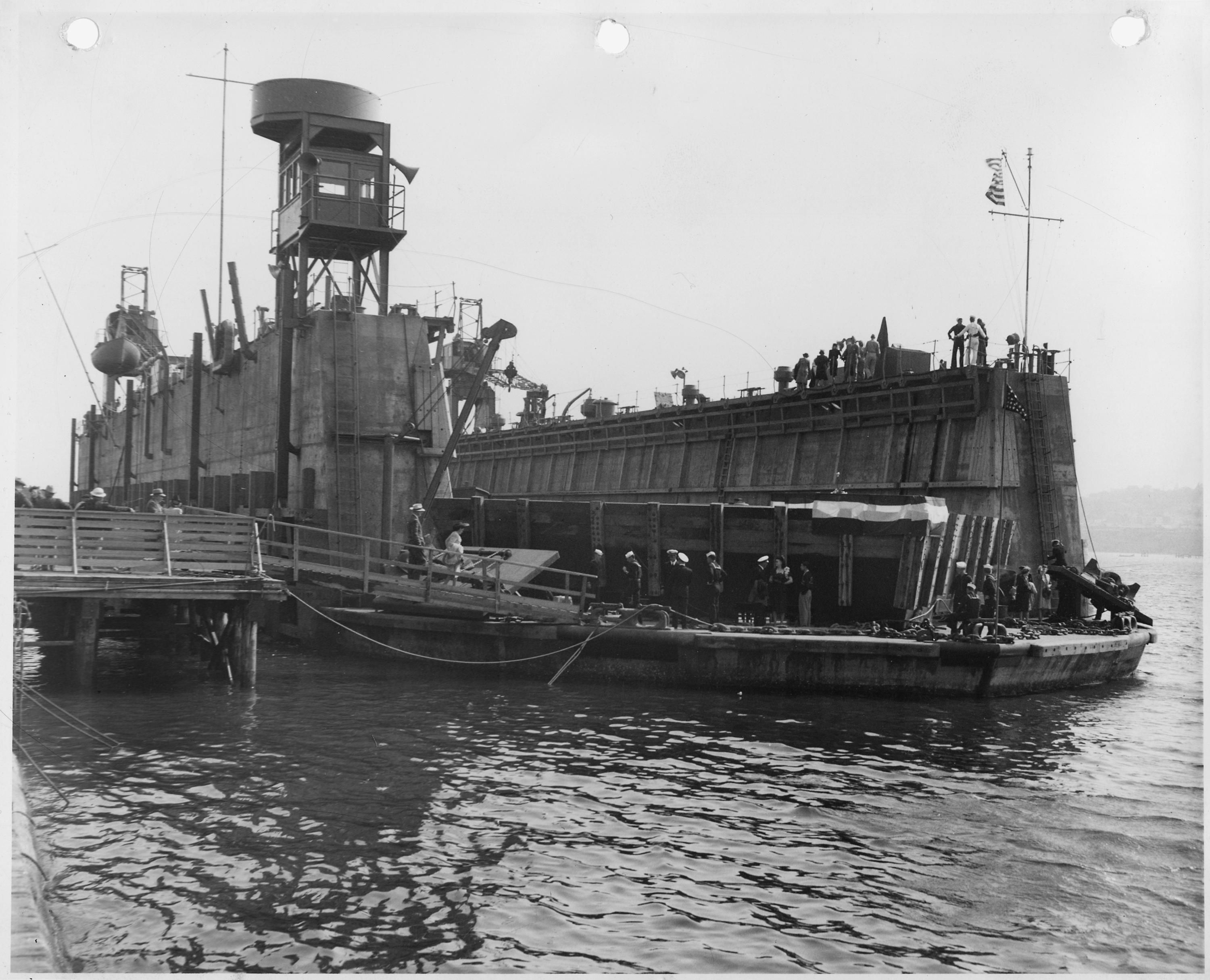
ARDC-13, An Auxiliary Repair Dock, Concrete

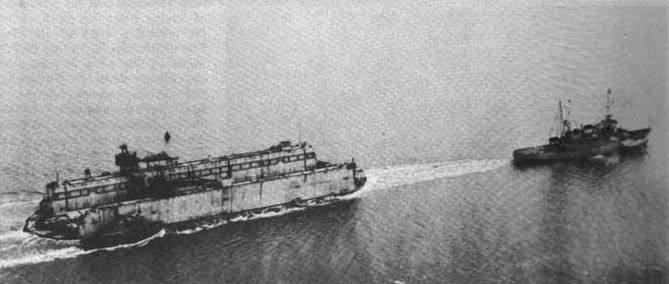
Auxiliary Repair Dock, Concrete under tow

Auxiliary Repair Docks, Concrete were mobile (towable) dry docks made of concrete, due to the shortage of steel during World War II. Somewhat smaller than metal ARDs, ARDCs measured 389 ft (119 m) in length, 84 ft (26 m) in width, and 40 ft (12 m) in depth. ARDCs had crews of five officers and 84 enlisted men. The first ARDC had a built-in diesel power supply, while the remainder relied on outside power sources. All were equipped with a 5-ton crane with a 42 ft (13 m) reach. Eight were built at Wilmington, North Carolina, and five at San Pedro in Los Angeles, California.

- ARDC 1 – Changed to AFDL-34. Sold to Taiwan in 1959 Han Jih.
- ARDC 2 – Changed to AFDL-35. Scrapped in 1974.
- ARDC 3 – Changed to AFDL-36. Sold to Taiwan in 1947 Hay Tan. Scuttled in 2000.
- ARDC 4 – Changed to AFDL-37. Scrapped in 1981.
- ARDC 5 – Changed to AFDL-38. Placed out of service, date unknown. Final Disposition, transferred to San Francisco Maritime National Historical Park and leased to Bay Ship and Yacht shipyard at Alameda, CA.
- ARDC 6 – Changed to AFDL-39. Sold to Brazil in 1980 Cidade de Natal.
- ARDC 7 – Changed to AFDL-40. Sold to the Philippines in 1990.
- ARDC 8 – Changed to AFDL-41. Sold in 1983 to North Florida Shipyard
- ARDC 9 – Changed to AFDL-42. Sold to Hurley Marine Works in 1945. Scrapped in 1975.
- ARDC 10 – Changed to AFDL-43. Scrapped in 1979.
- ARDC 11 – Changed to AFDL-44. Sold to the Philippines in 1969.
- ARDC 12 – Changed to AFDL-45. Sold to Todd Seattle 1945. Sold 1981 to Puglia Engineering.
- ARDC-13 – Changed to AFDL-46. Destroyed at Bikini in 1946.

=== Yard Floating Docks (YFDs) ===
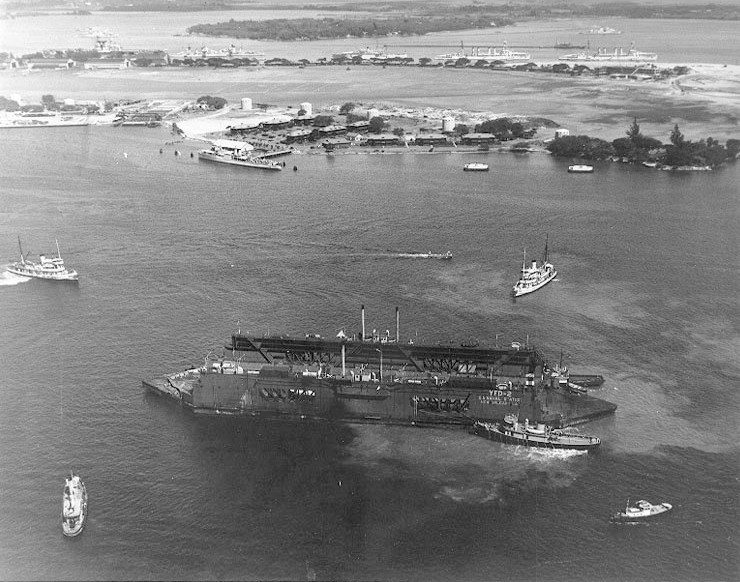
YFD-2 The first Yard Floating Dock built in 1901, arriving Pearl Harbor 23 Oct. 1940 from New Orleans Naval Yard

The designation "Yard Floating Dock" (YFD) was used for floating docks of a variety of sizes and types, built mostly for harbor or shipyard use. YFDs normally had little to no crew space and were serviced from shore. Some Auxiliary Repair Docks were converted to YFDs. Types of YFDs included: 400-ton concrete docks; 1,000-ton, 3,000-ton and 5,000-ton wooden docks; wooden sectional docks with 7,000 to 20,000 ton lifting capacities; and three-piece self-docking steel sectional docks (whose individual sections could be docked for repairs within a shortened dock made from the rest) with 14,000 to 18,000 ton lifting capacities. Fourteen YFDs were redesignated as Auxiliary Floating Docks, Medium (see above) after World War II.

- USS Dewey (YFD-1) Built in 1905.
- USS YFD-2 Built in 1901. Damaged in the attack at Pearl Harbor on 7 December 1941 and then repaired.
- USS Richland (YFD-64)
- USS YFD-67. A medium auxiliary floating dry dock. Retired in 2003.
- USS YFD-3
- USS YFD-4
- USS YFD-5
- USS YFD-6
- USS YFD-7
- USS YFD-8
- USS YFD-9
- USS YFD-10
- USS YFD-11
- USS YFD-12
- USS YFD-13
- USS YFD-14
- USS YFD-15
- USS YFD-16
- USS YFD-17
- USS YFD-18
- USS YFD-19
- USS YFD-20
- USS YFD-21
- USS YFD-22
- USS YFD-23
- USS YFD-24
- USS YFD-25
- USS YFD-26
- USS YFD-27
- USS YFD-28
- USS YFD-29
- USS YFD-30
- USS YFD-31
- USS YFD-32
- USS YFD-33
- USS YFD-34
- USS YFD-35
- USS YFD-36
- USS YFD-37
- USS YFD-38
- USS YFD-39
- USS YFD-40
- USS YFD-41
- USS YFD-42
- USS YFD-43
- USS YFD-44
- USS YFD-45
- USS YFD-46
- USS YFD-47
- USS YFD-48
- USS YFD-49
- USS YFD-50
- USS YFD-51
- USS YFD-52
- USS YFD-53
- USS YFD-54
- USS YFD-55
- USS YFD-56
- USS YFD-57
- USS YFD-58
- USS YFD-59
- USS YFD-60
- USS YFD-61
- USS YFD-62
- USS YFD-63
- USS YFD-64
- USS YFD-65
- USS YFD-66
- USS YFD-67
- USS YFD-68
- USS YFD-69
- USS YFD-70
- USS YFD-71
- USS YFD-72
- USS YFD-73
- USS YFD-74
- USS YFD-75
- USS YFD-76
- USS YFD-77
- USS YFD-78
- USS YFD-79
- USS YFD-80
- USS YFD-81
- USS YFD-82

== Image gallery ==
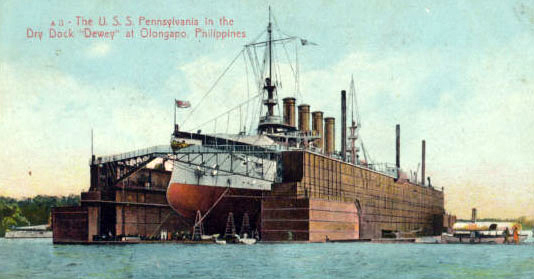
USS Pennsylvania (ACR-4) in dry dock Dewey, c. 1906–1907

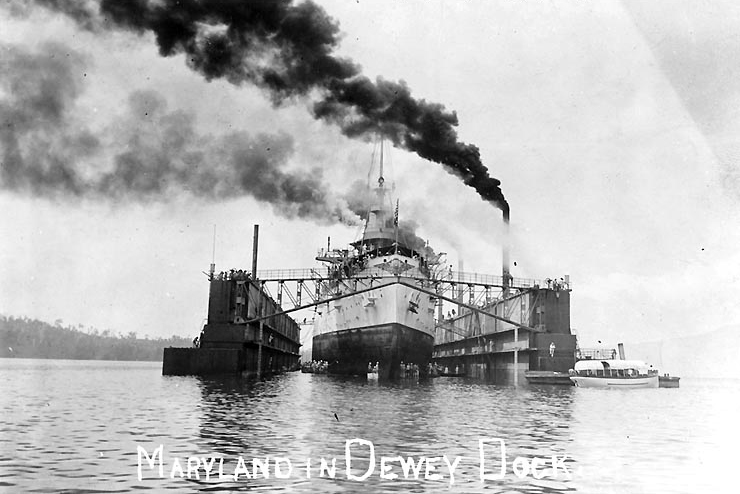
USS Maryland (ACR-8) in dry dock Dewey, c. 1907

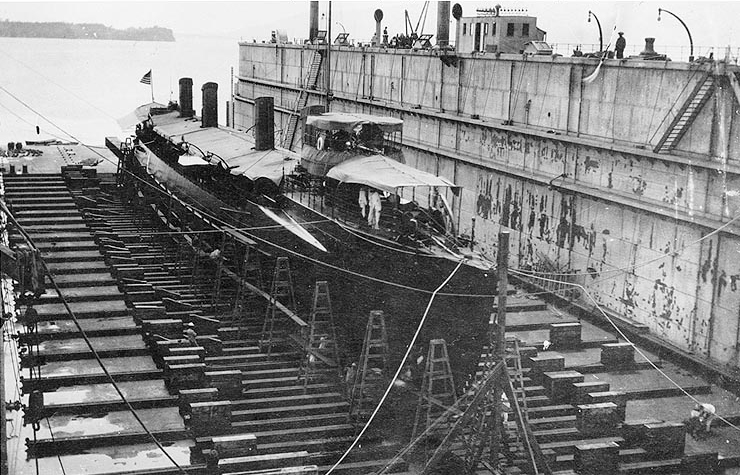
USS Chauncey (DD-3) in dry dock Dewey, c. 1910

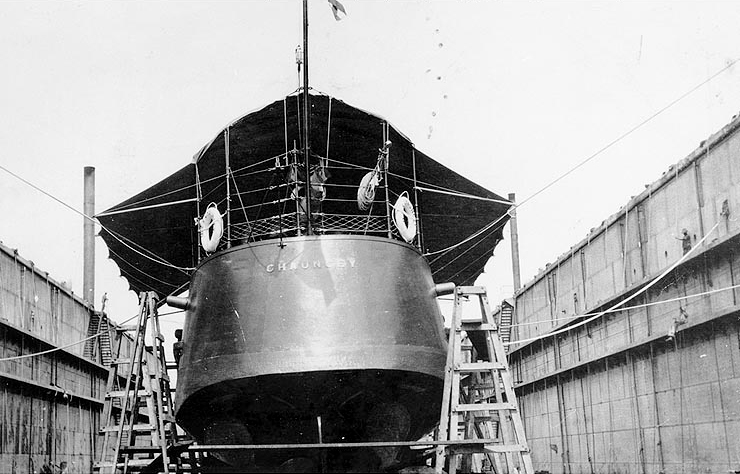
USS Chauncey (DD-3) in dry dock Dewey, stern view, c. 1910

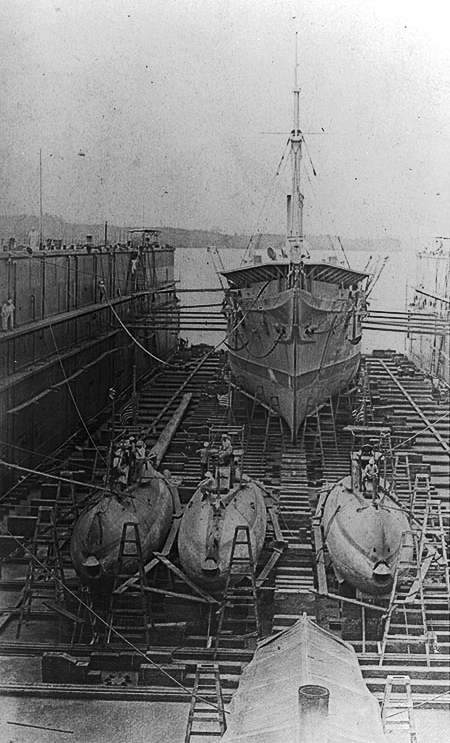
US Navy submarines in dry dock Dewey, c. 1912

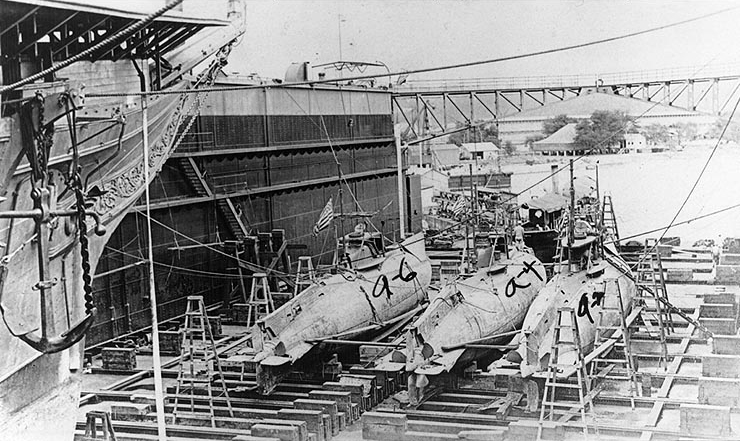
US Navy submarines in dry dock Dewey, c. 1912

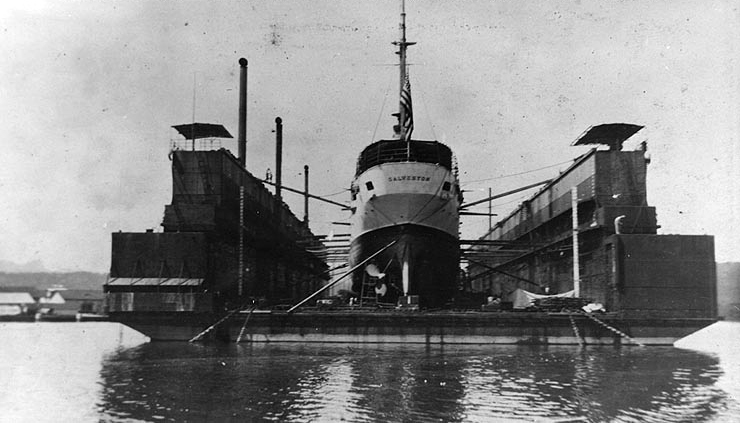
USS Galveston (CL-19) in dry dock Dewey, c. 1916

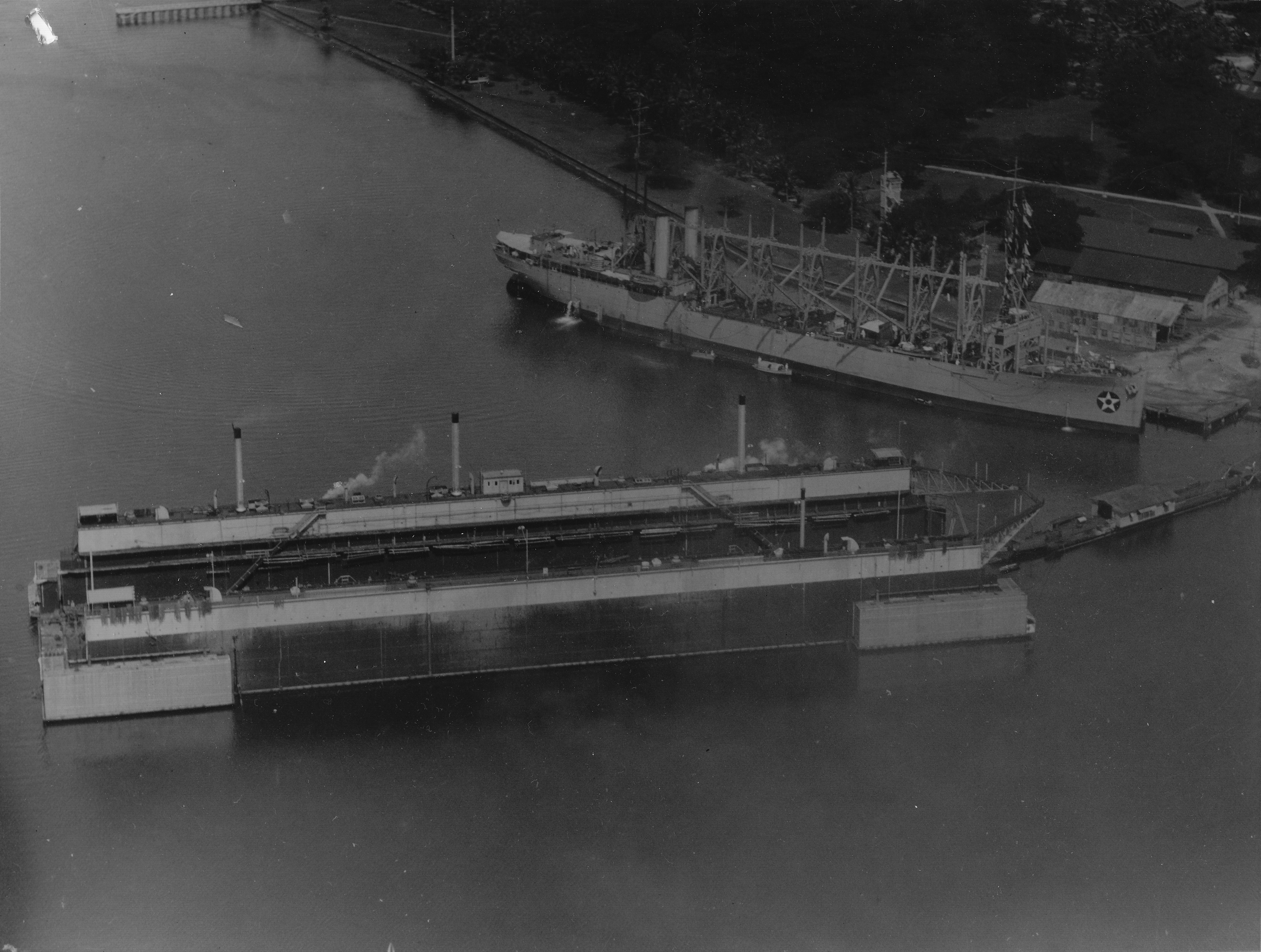
Aerial view of dry dock Dewey with USS Jason (AV-2) nearby, October 1928

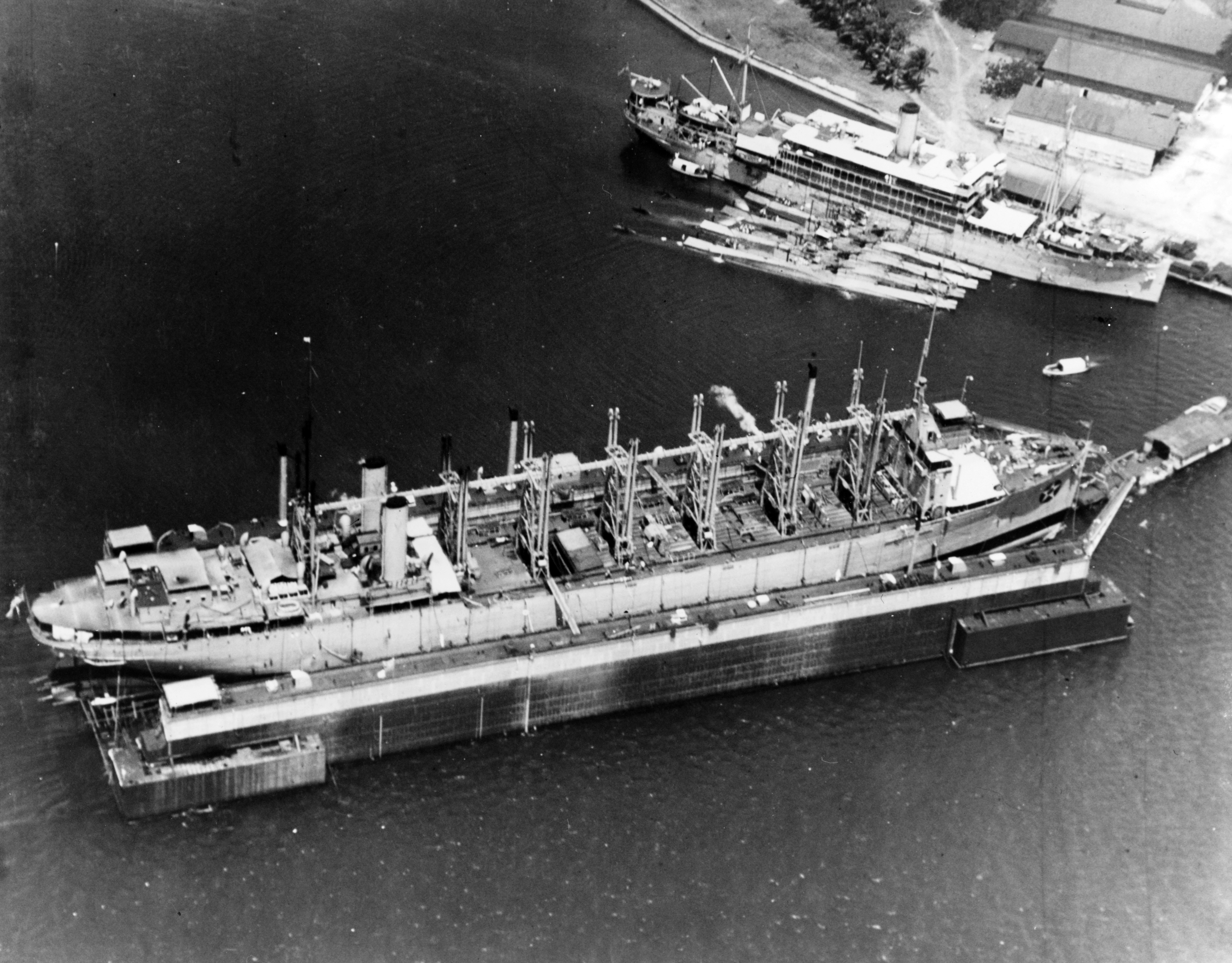
Aerial view of USS Jason (AV-2) in dry dock Dewey, 8 March 1932

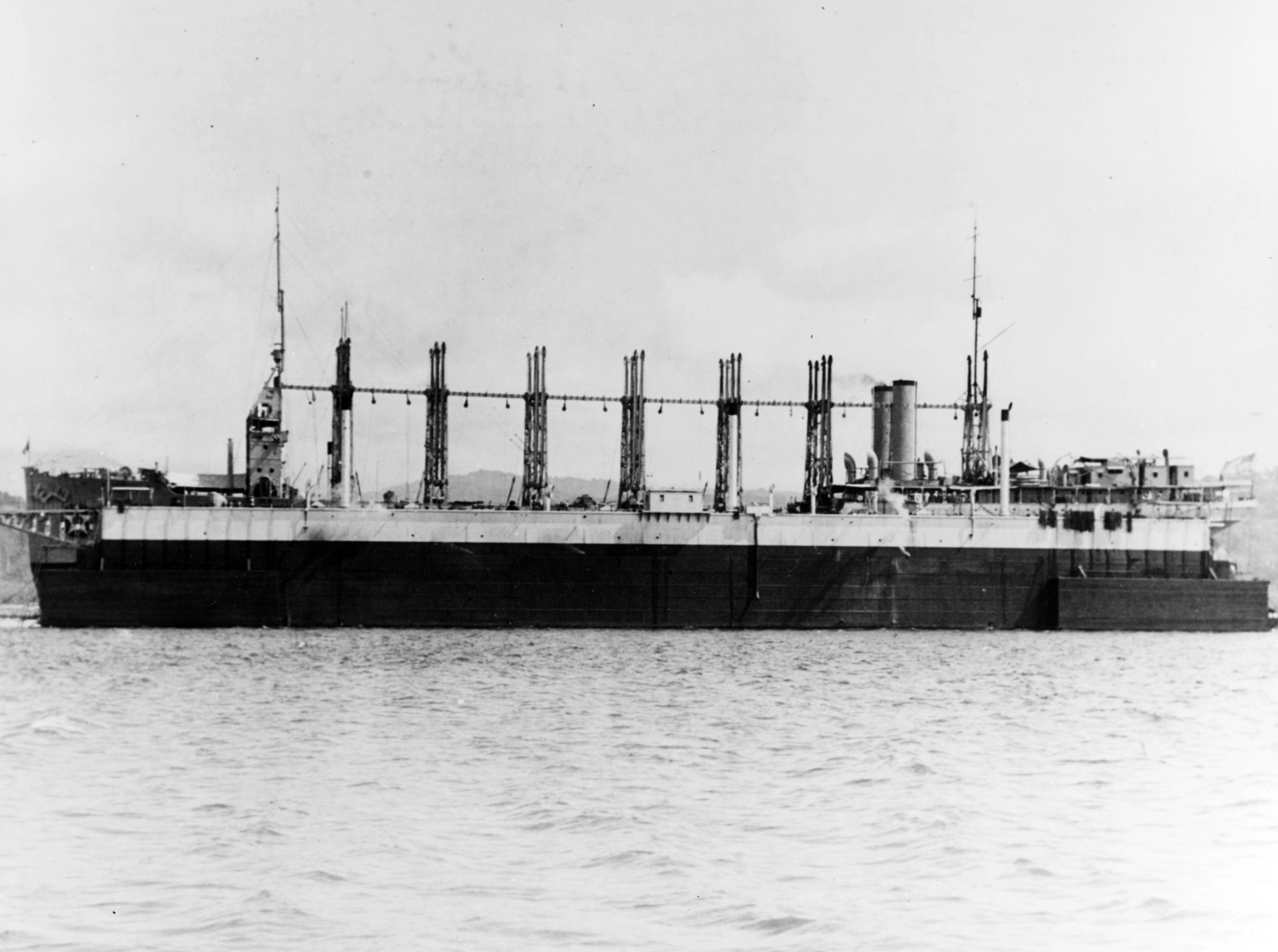
Side view of USS Jason (AV-2) in dry dock Dewey, 9 March 1932

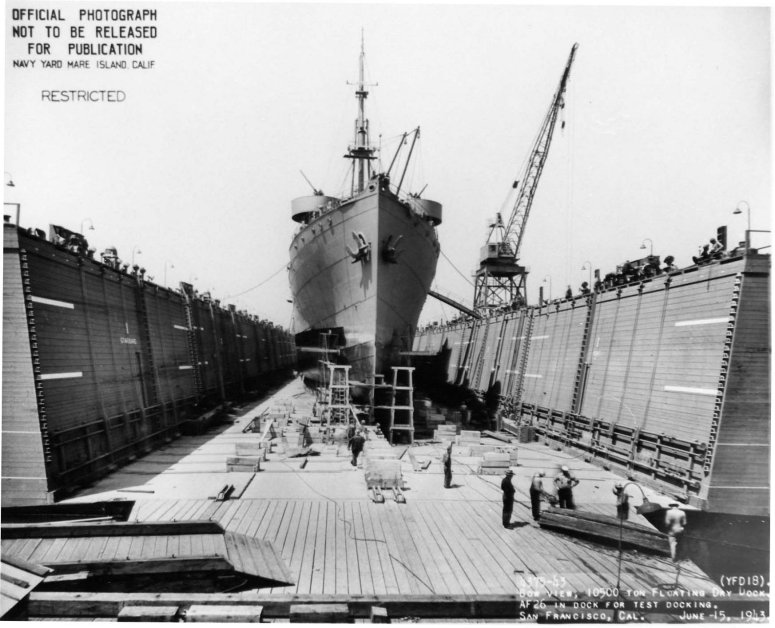
USS Octans (AF-26) in YFD-18 at San Francisco on 15 June 1943

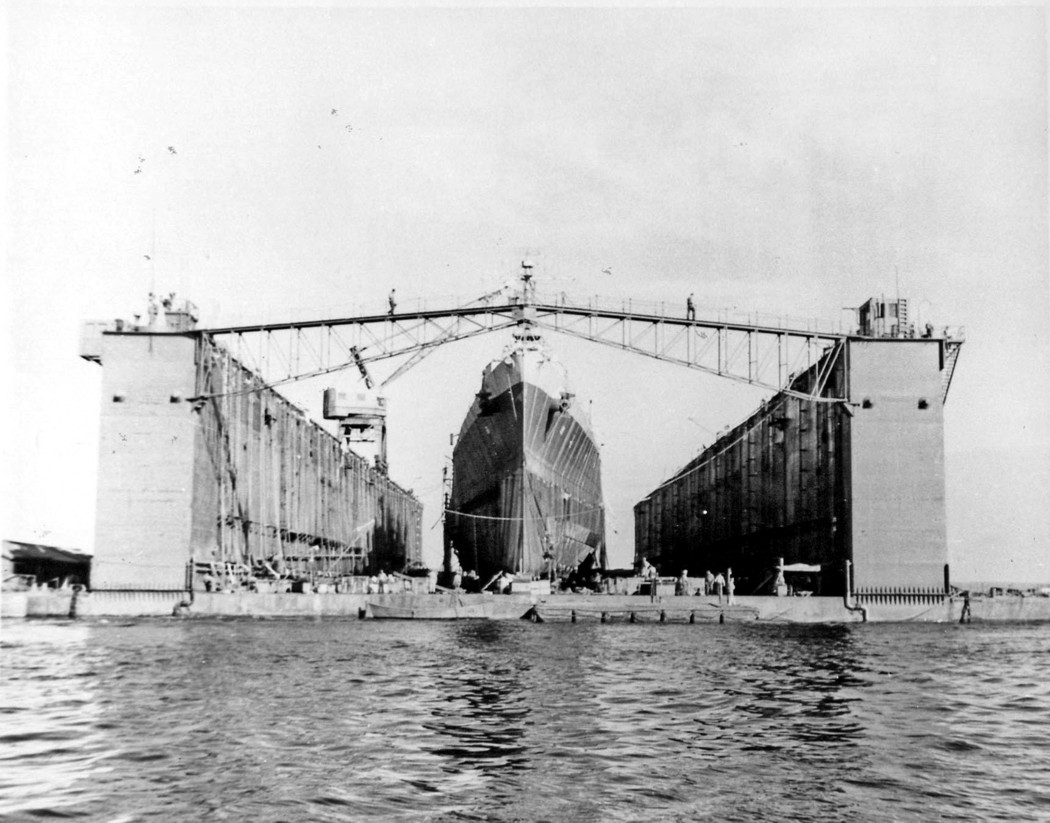
Cruiser Columbia (CL-56) docked in Artisan (ABSD-1) at Espiritu Santo in January 1944

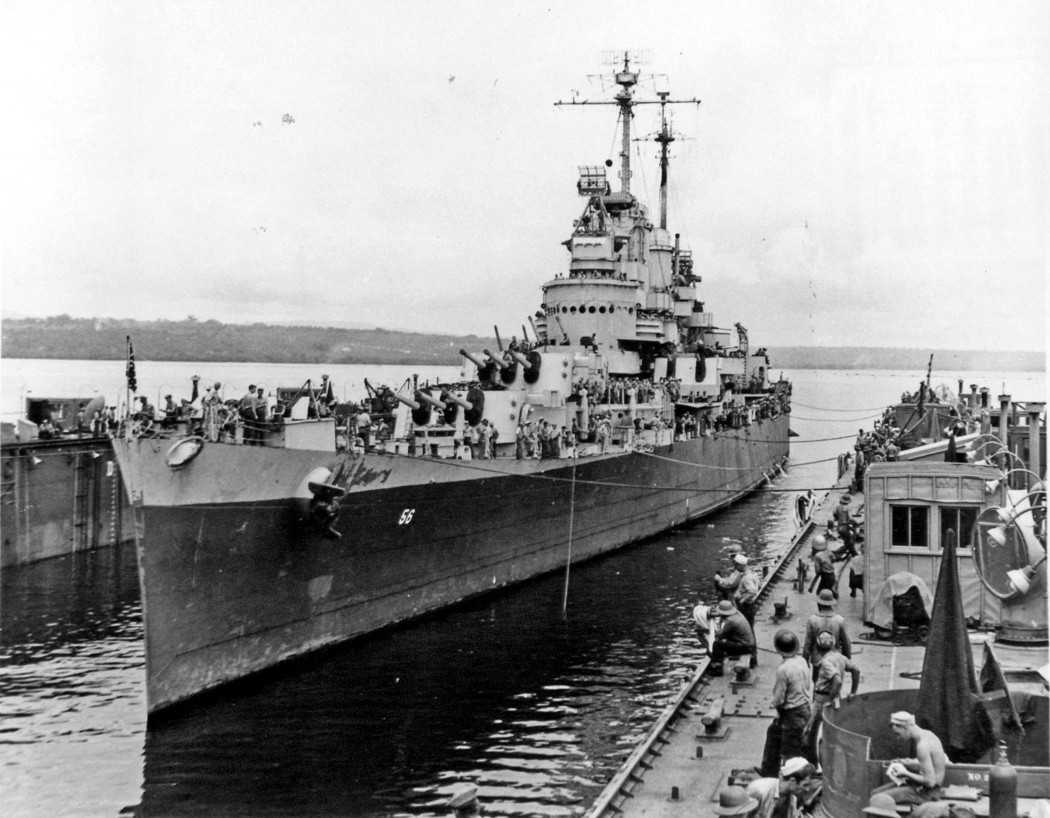
Columbia docked in Artisan ABSD-1 at Espiritu Santo in January 1944

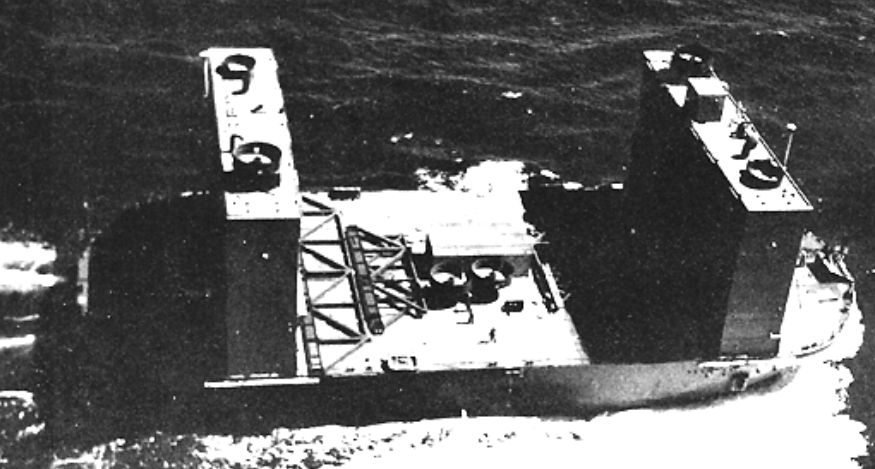
One Advance Base Sectional Dock (ABSD) section under tow with float wings up in 1944

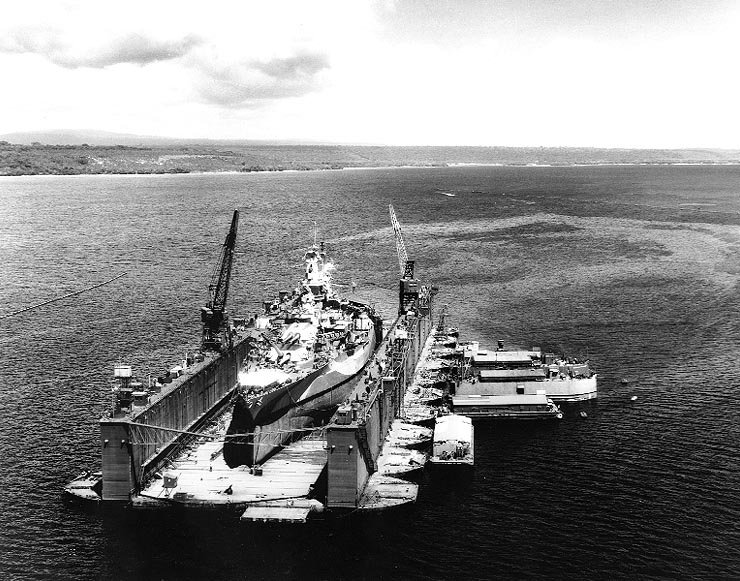
AFDB-1 with USS West Virginia (BB-48) high and dry in the dock November 1944

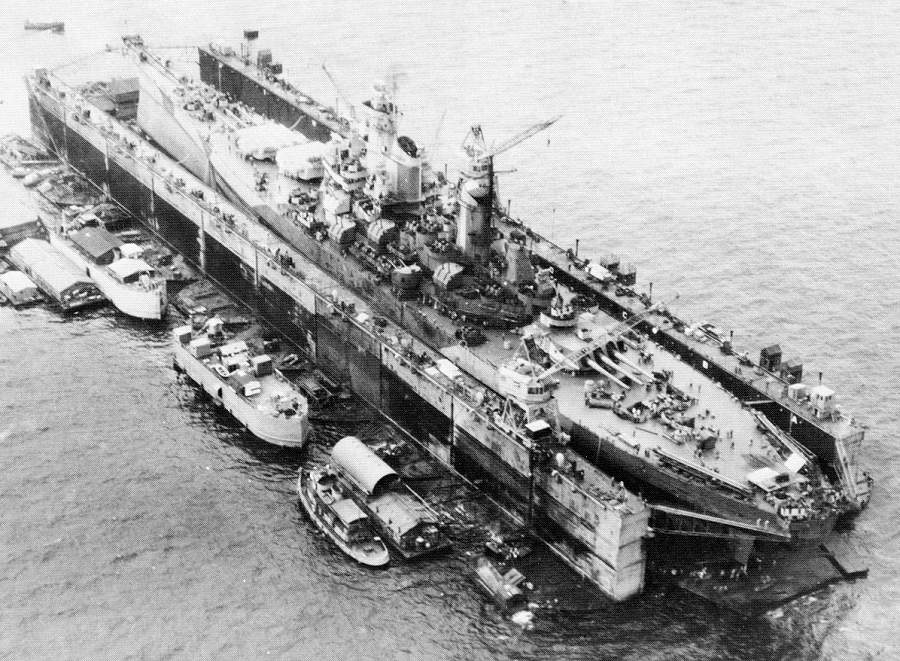
USS Iowa (BB-61) floating in dry dock at Manus Island, Admiralty Islands, 28 December 1944

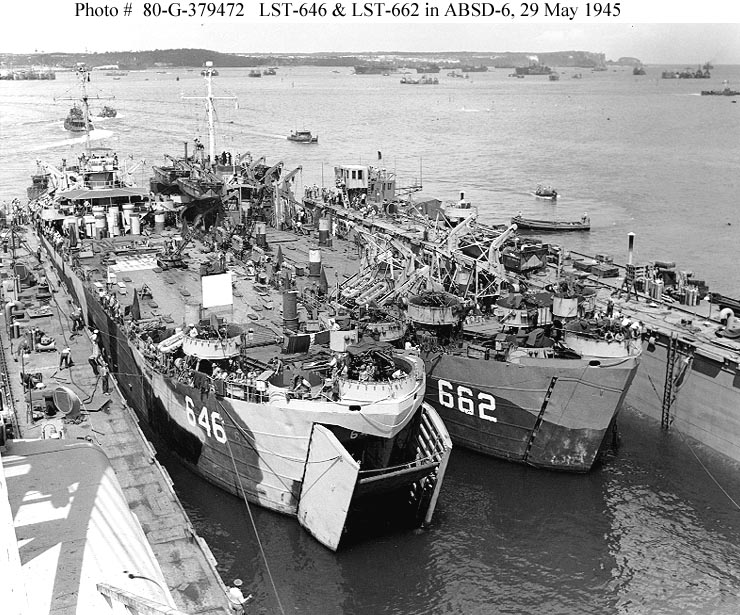
USS LST-646 and USS LST-662 in ABSD-6, in Apra Harbor, Guam, 29 May 1945

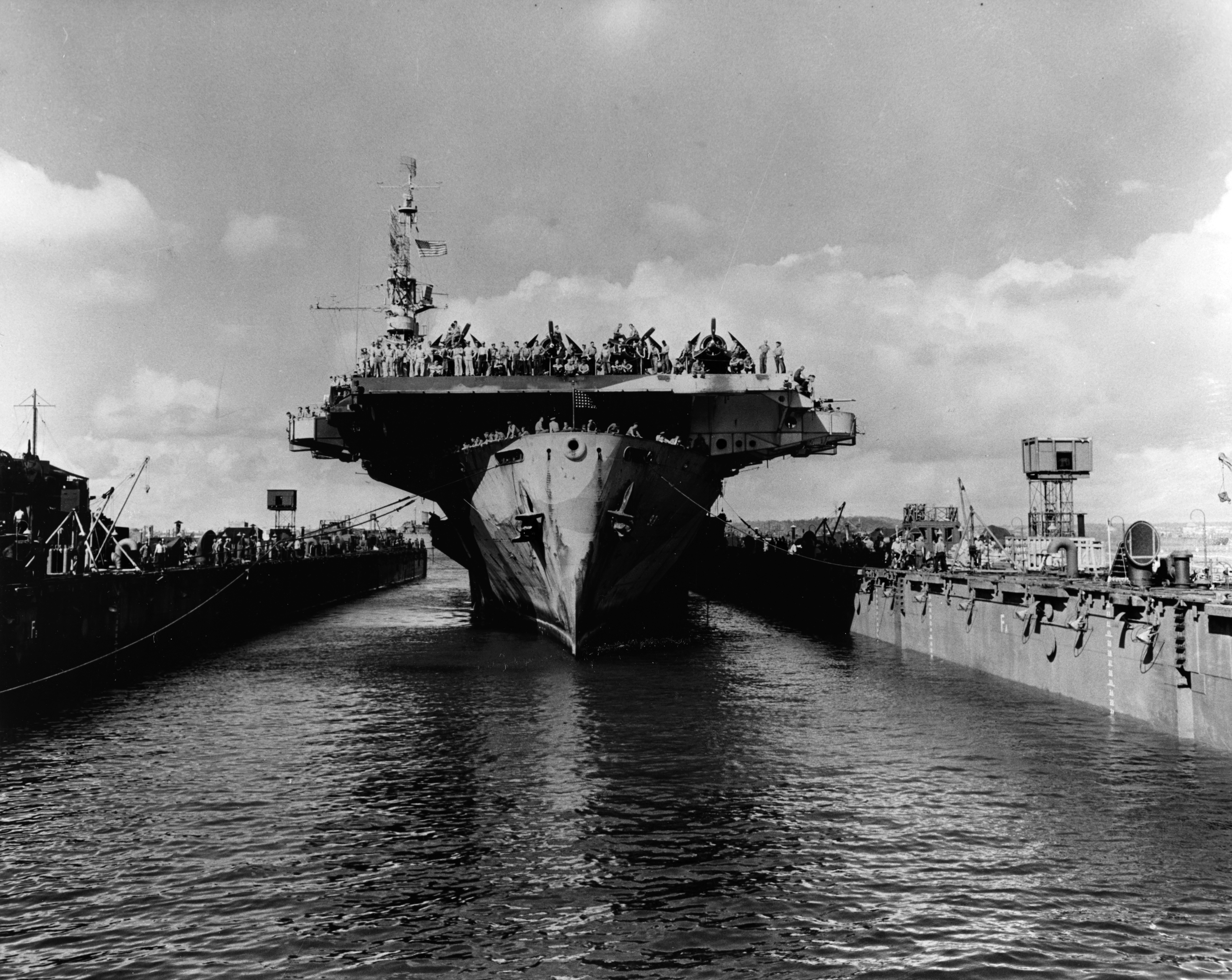
USS Makin Island (CVE-93) halfway into USS ABSD-6, at Guam, 8 June 1945

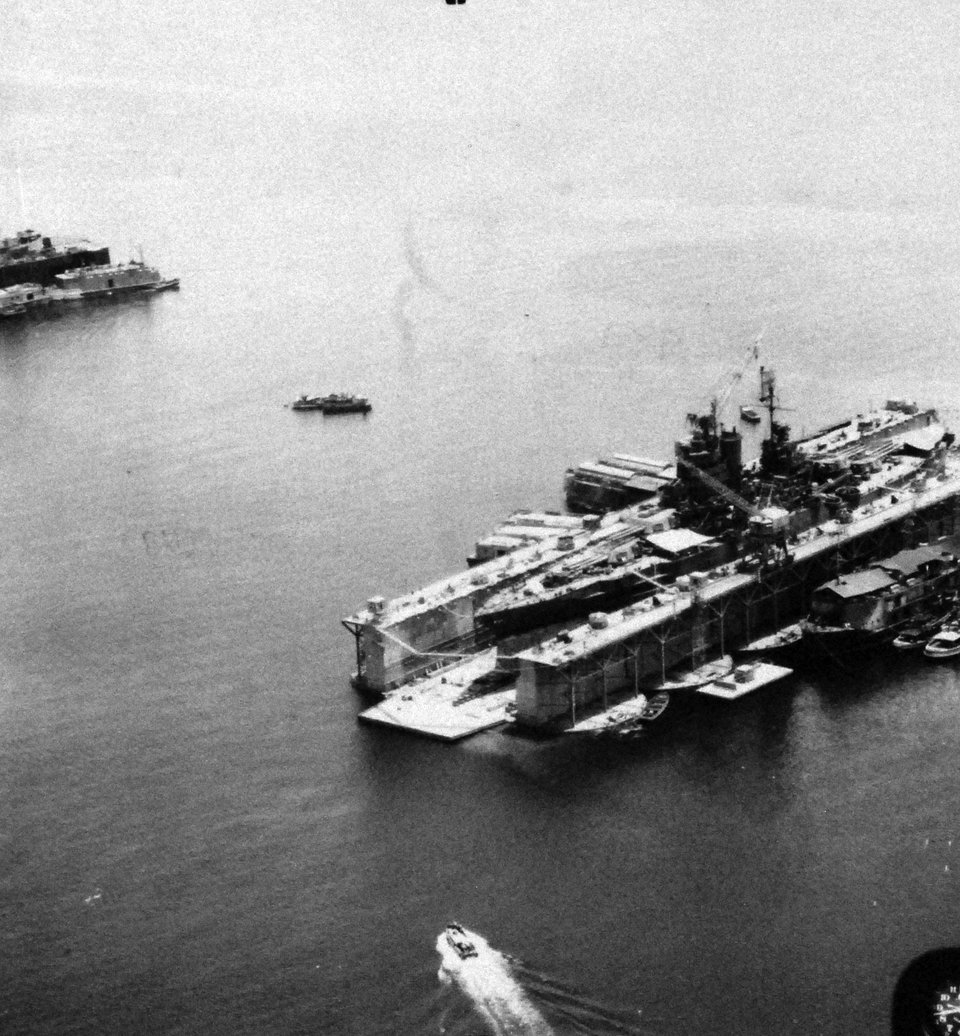
USS ABSD-5 at Manicani Island, Philippines repairing USS Mississippi in July 1945

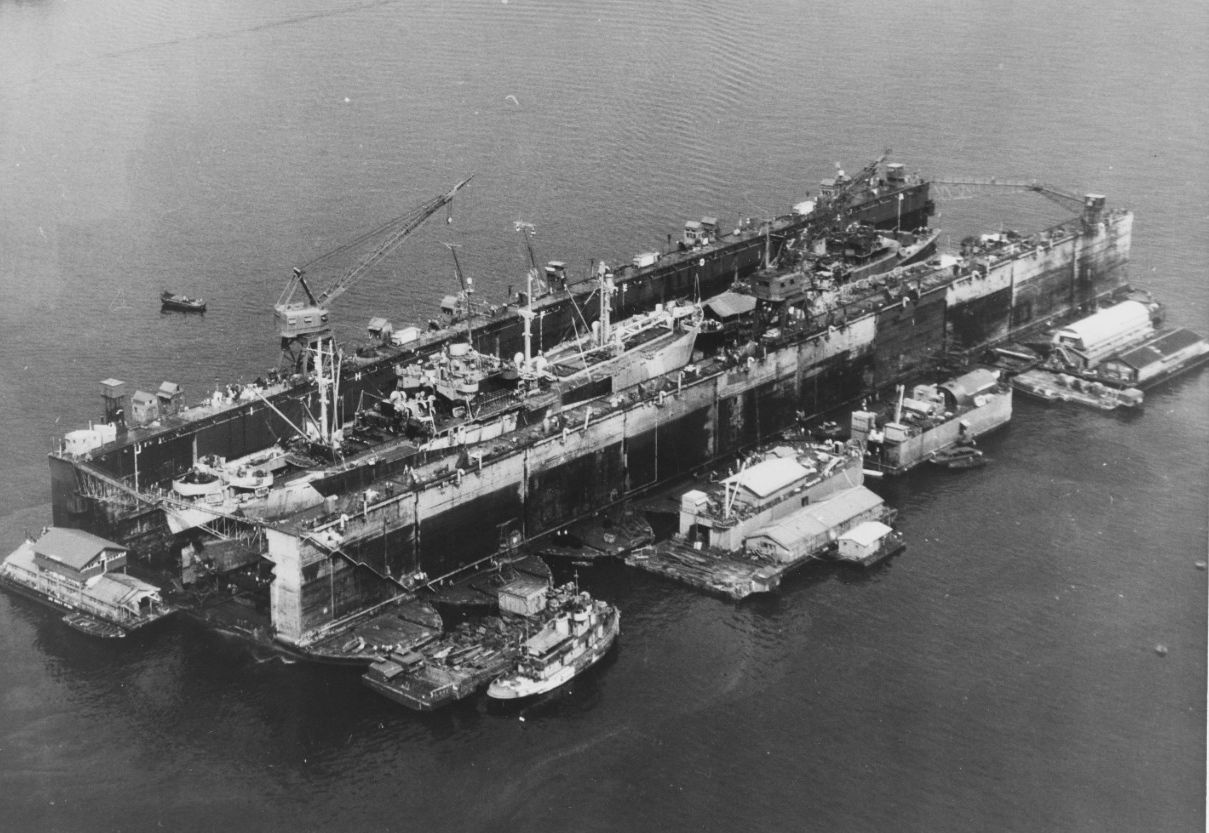
USS AFDB-2 at Seeadler Harbor in 1945

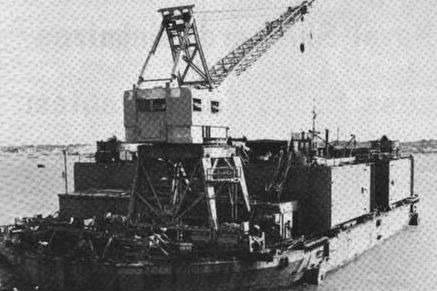
ABSD-6''s Section D and one crane under tow to Guam. Pontoons are folded down to reduce wind resistance and lower center of gravity

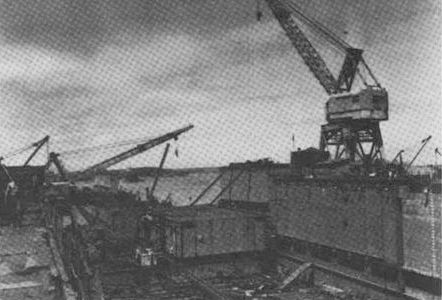
USS ABSD-6 being assembled at Apra Harbor, Guam in 1945

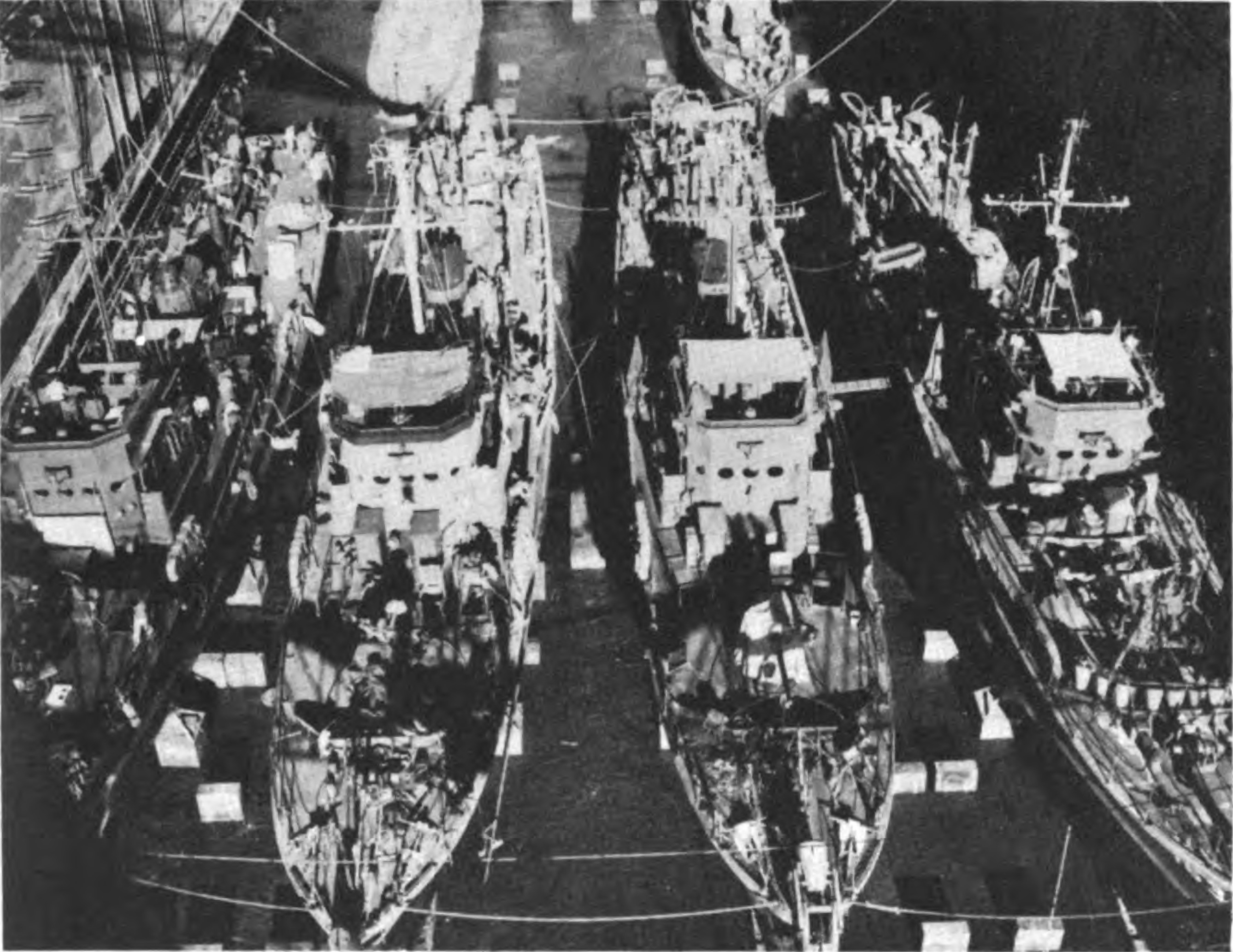
ABSD-3 repairing small ships (likely Admirable-class minesweepers or PCE-842-class patrol craft) at the same time at Guam in 1945

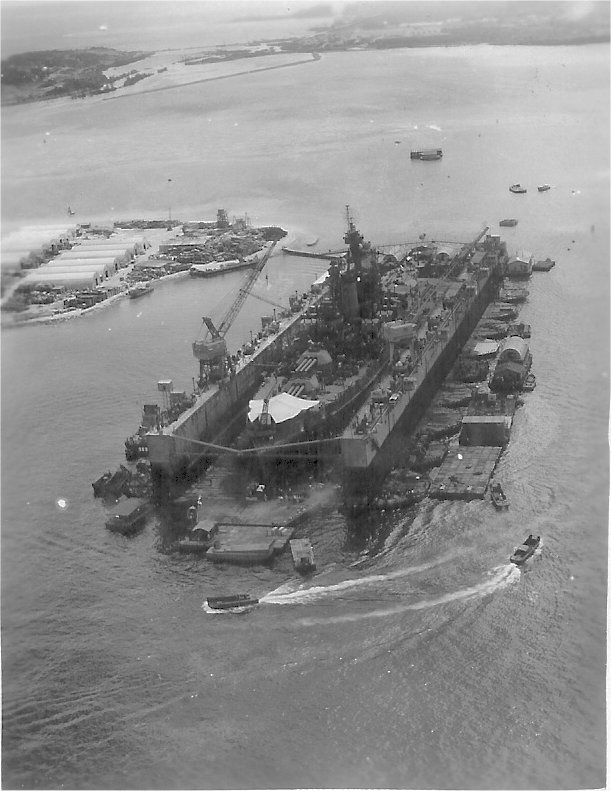
USS ABSD-3 at Guam ca. September 1945 repairing USS Pennsylvania (BB-38), to the rear right of ABSD-3 is the land base that supported the ABSD-6 and ABSD-3 crews

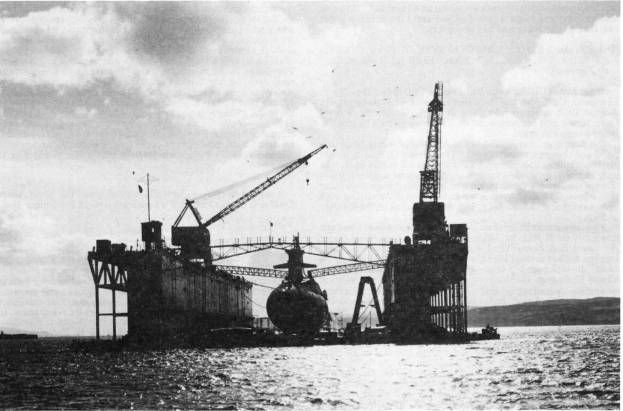
USS Abraham Lincoln (SSBN-602) in USS AFDB-7 at Holy Loch, Scotland, on 19 March 1963

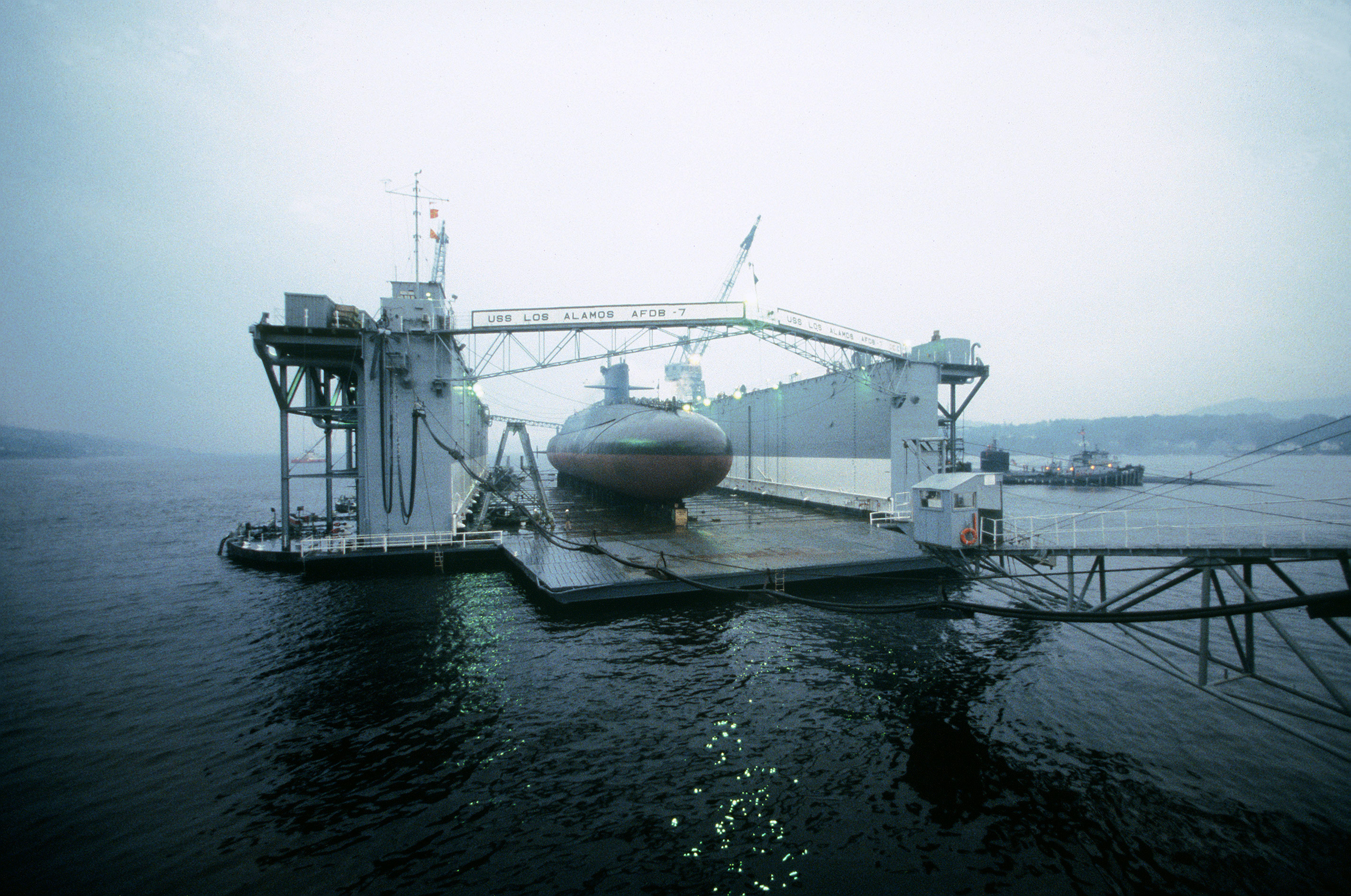
Los Alamos (AFDB-7) at Holy Loch, Scotland, on 1 December 1985

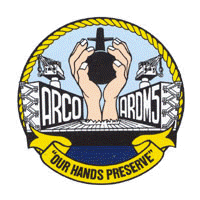
Official crest of Arco (ARDM-5)

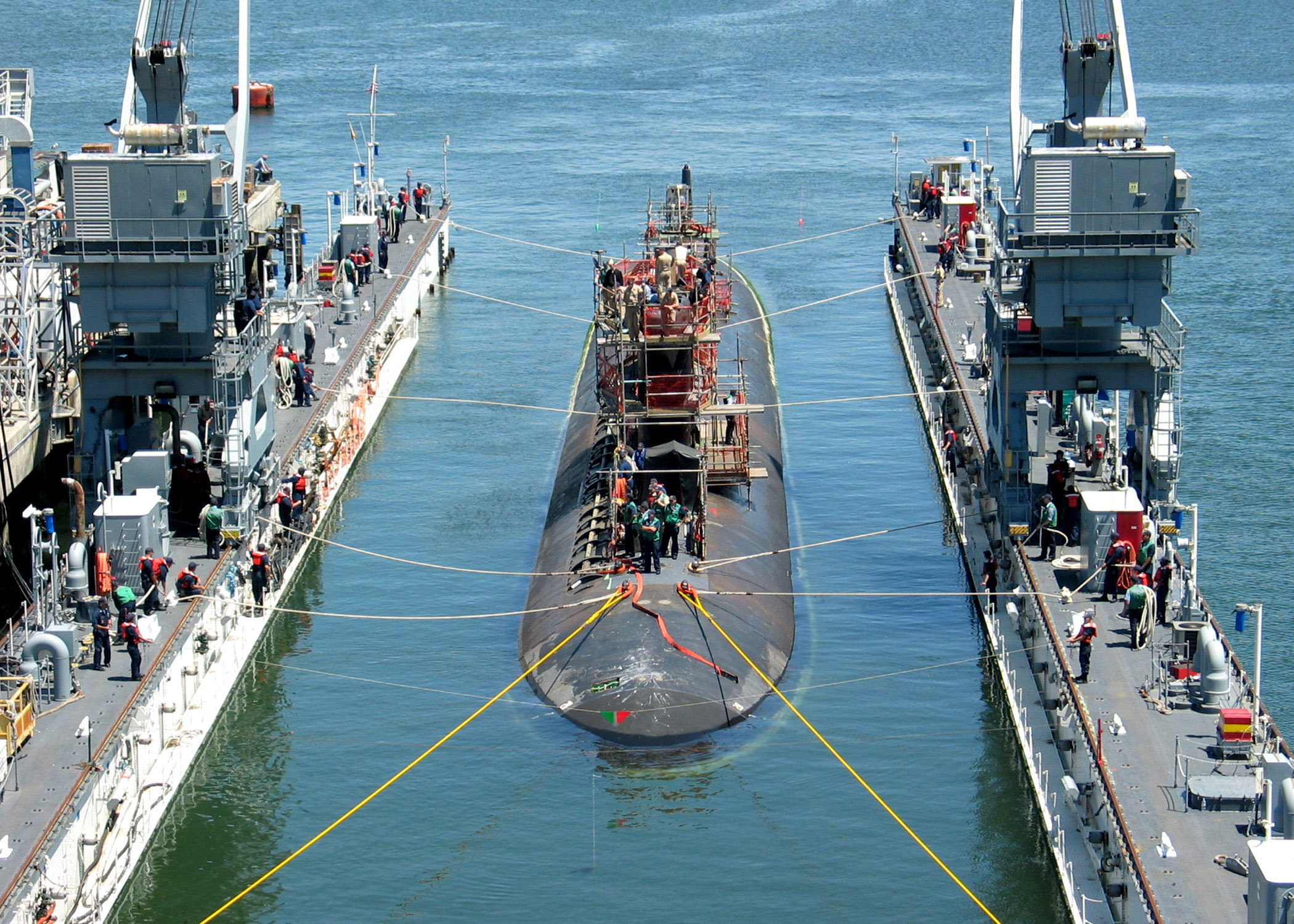
USS Asheville (SSN-758) enters the floating dry dock of Arco (ARDM-5) for scheduled maintenance at Naval Base Point Loma, California, on 25 April 2007

== See also ==
- Dry dock
- Heavy-lift ship
- Hughes Mining Barge
- PD-50 Russia's largest floating dry dock.
- Semi-submersible naval vessel
- Semi-submersible platform
- List of auxiliaries of the United States Navy § Auxiliary floating drydock
- List of yard and district craft of the United States Navy § Yard Floating Drydocks (YFD)
