= USS Richland (YFD-64) =

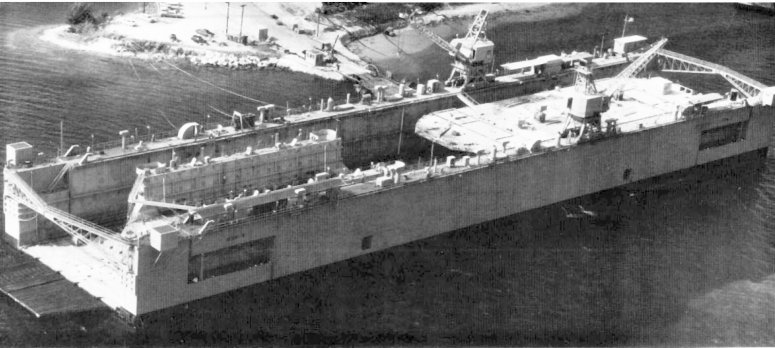

History

United States
- Name: Richland
- Namesake: named for the city of Richland, Washington, site of the Hanford atomic energy research and production plant
- Builder: Chicago Building & Iron Co., Eureka, California
- Laid down: date unknown
- Launched: date unknown
- Commissioned: 28 November 1944, as USS YFD-64
- Decommissioned: 8 June 1946, at Guam
- In service: 1 January 1947
- Out of service: c. 22 August 1997
- Renamed: Richland, 6 April 1968
- Reclassified: AFDM-8, 1 August 1946
- Stricken: 22 August 1997
- Fate: transferred to the local redevelopment authority in Guam on 6 April 1999.

History

Guam
- Name: Richland
- Owner: Local Redevelopment Authority of Guam
- Operator: Guam Shipyard
- Acquired: 6 April 1999
- Fate: Acquired by Harbor Star Maritime Service Inc. and being towed to the Philippines since 28 January 2016.

General characteristics
- Type: AFDM-3-class medium auxiliary floating drydock
- Displacement: 8,000 tons
- Length: 622 ft (190 m)
- Beam: 124 ft (38 m)
- Draft: 6 ft (1.8 m)
- Propulsion: no engine; must be towed
- Speed: varied with tow conditions
- Complement: 4 Officers, 146 Enlisted
- Armament: during the war: two 40 mm and four 20 mm machine guns

USS Richland (YFD-64/AFDM-8) is an AFDM-3-class medium auxiliary floating drydock built in California for the U.S. Navy. Originally named USS YFD-64, she was towed to the Philippines and Guam where she served until war's end.

In 1946 she was placed back into service to support submarine maintenance at Guam for the next forty years.

== History ==
=== United States Navy ===
==== Construction ====
The second ship to be so named by the Navy, Richland (AFDM-8) was built by the Chicago Building & Iron Co., Eureka, California, and commissioned as YFD-64 on 28 November 1944.

==== World War II ====
Drydock YFD-64 remained on the west coast until 15 December 1944 when she was towed to Pearl Harbor. On 25 January 1945 she was towed into Eniwetok and then on to Ulithi. She was next towed to San Pedro Bay where she worked until November when she was towed to Guam. She decommissioned there on 8 June 1946.

==== Post-war reactivation and service ====
YFD-64 was redesignated AFDM-8 on 1 August 1946, placed in service at Guam on 1 January 1947. The floating drydock supported Fleet Ballistic Missile submarine maintenance at Guam for over forty years. She was named Richland on 6 April 1968.

=== Dispositioning at end of service ===
The drydock was struck from the Navy List on 22 August 1997 and transferred to the local redevelopment authority in Guam on 6 April 1999.

=== Transfer to the Philippines ===
After its service with the U.S. Navy, Richland became an asset owned by Guam Shipyard. The drydock was reportedly bought from Guam Shipyard in January 2016 to an undisclosed buyer. Richland was then moved to the Philippines. On January 28, 2016, local tugboats and the 467-ton Philippine tug Rhocas began moving the drydock an operation that would take several days.

It was later reported that Philippine maritime service provider Harbor Star Shipping Services bought the floating drydock, and was also providing the towing from Guam to the Philippines.

October 2017 Currently waiting for repair, in RRYD, yacht and ship repair, AFAB, Mariveles, Bataan. Coincidentally is same location for the Zero KM Bataan Death March Marker

== Honors and awards ==
Qualified Richland personnel were eligible for the following:

- American Campaign Medal
- Asiatic-Pacific Campaign Medal
- World War II Victory Medal
- National Defense Service Medal
