= ARDC-13 =

Floating drydock of the United States Navy

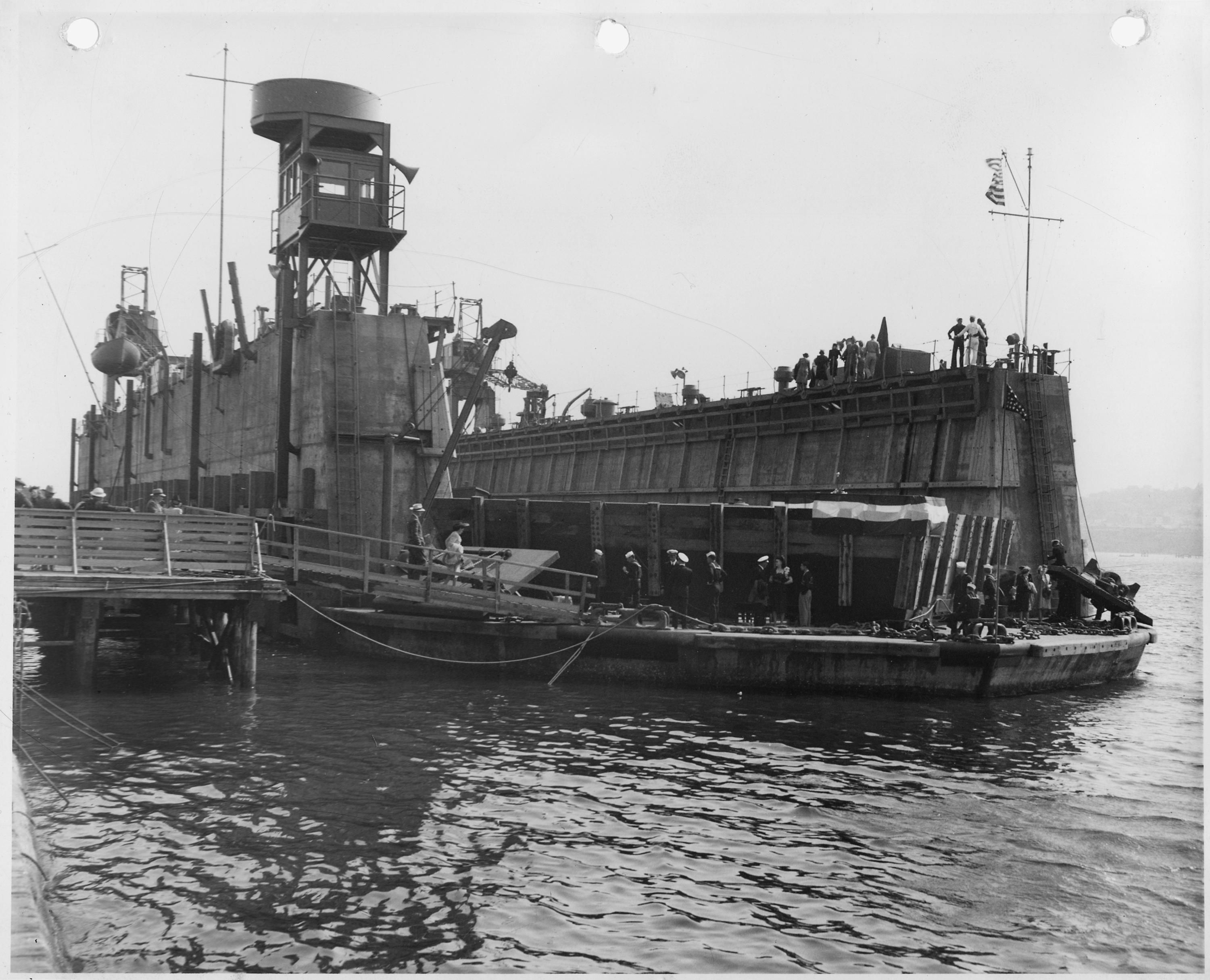
ARDC-13

The ARDC-13 was a 2800-ton auxiliary floating drydock used for testing during the Able and Baker nuclear weapon tests of Operation Crossroads in the Bikini Atoll. It was used to determine the effects of the atomic bomb phenomena on land-based concrete structures. The final report on ARDC-13 was part of a final supplementary report to the Commander Joint Task Force One. The ARDC-13 was built by the Haddock Company of Pasadena, California, in March 1946 under contract Noy-11999. It was 84 feet by 389 feet with a depth of 14 feet. Two wingwalls, both 26 feet high and 306 feet long, were mounted on top of the ARDC-13. Steel frames were built within the wingwalls for extra support. The wingwalls consisted of transverse frames and both water and non-watertight bulkheads. The ARDC-13 was important for confirming that water-front structures needed to be designed to withstand severe waves and flooding as ports are considered a good target for bombs.

== Test A (Test Able) ==
Test Able (or test A)was performed on July 1, 1946, as a part of Operation Crossroads. The test caused cracking and derangement of interior furnishing within the ARDC-13 at eight-hundred and forty yards away from the blast. However, the dock retained its structural shape. There was charring of the port side fenders and the outboard face of the port wall was lightly charred as well. All walkways and other timber on the dock was heavily charred or destroyed. The dock was cleared radiologically on July 4, 1946, and repaired to prepare for test B. The dock was re-positioned on July 13, 1946, using four twenty-four thousand pound anchors and readied for Test Baker.

== Williams Day Rehearsal of Test Baker ==
The Williams Day Rehearsal of Test Baker was conducted using four M-46 flash bombs mounted on top of the starboard wing wall.

== Test B (Test Baker) ==
Test B (or Test Baker) was conducted on July 24, 1946, as part of Operation Crossroads and the test resulted in no considerable damage to the concrete vessels, however, it was noted that the test worsened previous cracking from test A. The ARDC-13 showed radiation levels seventy times that of the allowed tolerance eight days after the test at twelve-hundred and fifty yards from the blast. The radiology contamination only allowed the personnel between sixteen and thirty minutes per day aboard the dry dock.

The ARDC-13 capsized to port on August 4, 1946, due to excessive flooding. The Director of Ship Material recommended that the dry dock be sunk. The ARDC-13 was sunk using demolition charges at 1735 on August 6, 1946.
