= USS LST-662 =

1944 LST-542-class tank landing ship

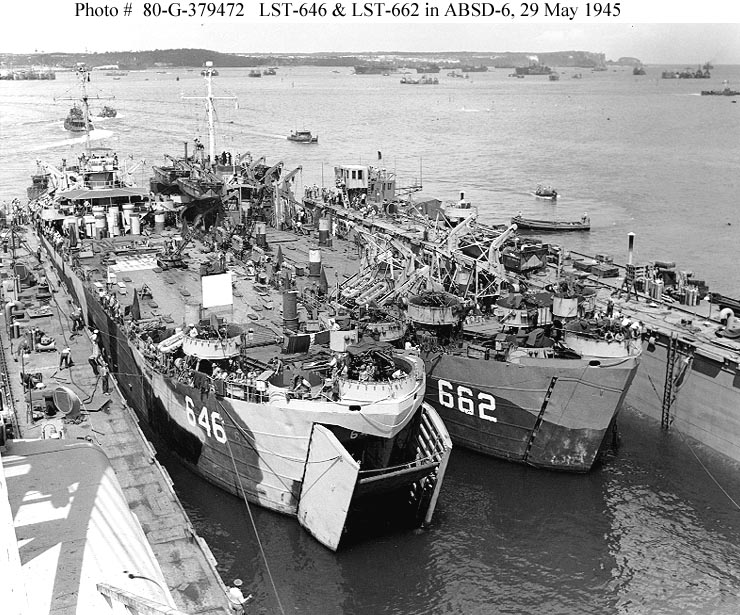
- USS LST-662 in drydock, Guam, 29 May 1945

History

United States
- Name: USS LST-662
- Builder: American Bridge Company; Ambridge, Pennsylvania
- Laid down: 14 January 1944
- Launched: 5 April 1944
- Sponsored by: Miss Louise Leahy
- Commissioned: 2 May 1944
- Decommissioned: 19 December 1945
- Stricken: 8 January 1946
- Honors and awards: 3 battle stars, World War II
- Fate: Sold for commercial use, 25 June 1946

General characteristics
- Class & type: LST-542-class tank landing ship
- Displacement: 1,780 tons (light); 3,640 tons
- Length: 328 ft (100.0 m)
- Beam: 50 ft (15.2 m)
- Draft: 2 ft 4 in (0.71 m) fwd; 7 ft 6 in (2.29 m) aft (unloaded); 8 feet 2 inches (2.49 m) fwd; 14 feet 1 inch (4.29 m) aft (full load)
- Propulsion: Two General Motors 12-567 diesel engines, two shafts
- Speed: 10.8 knots (20.0 km/h) (max); 9 knots (17 km/h) (econ)
- Troops: 140 officers and enlisted
- Complement: 8–10 officers, 100–115 enlisted
- Armament: 8 × 40 mm AA guns; 12 × 20 mm AA guns

USS LST-662 was an LST-542-class tank landing ship built for the United States Navy in World War II. Like most ships of her class, she was not named and properly known only by her designation.

During World War II, LST-662 was assigned to the Asiatic-Pacific theater and participated in the following operations:

- Battle of Peleliu, September and October 1944
- Zambales-Subic Bay, January 1945
- Battle of Okinawa, April 1945

Following the war, LST-662 was decommissioned on 19 December 1945 and struck from the Navy List on 8 January 1946. On 25 June 1946, the ship was sold to Arctic Circle Exploration, Inc., of Seattle, Washington.

LST-662 earned three battle stars for World War II service.

== Photo gallery ==
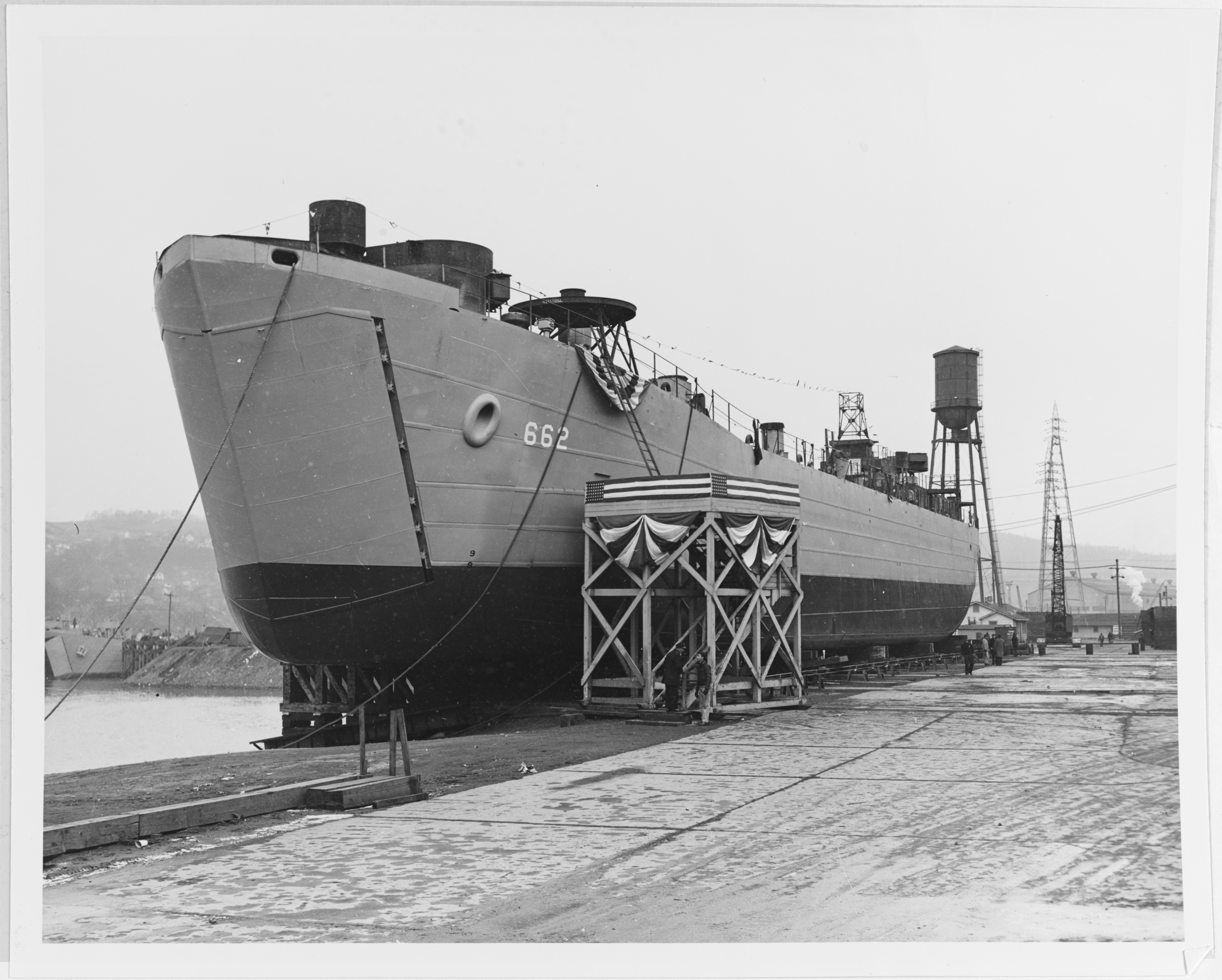
LST-662 ready for launching ceremony

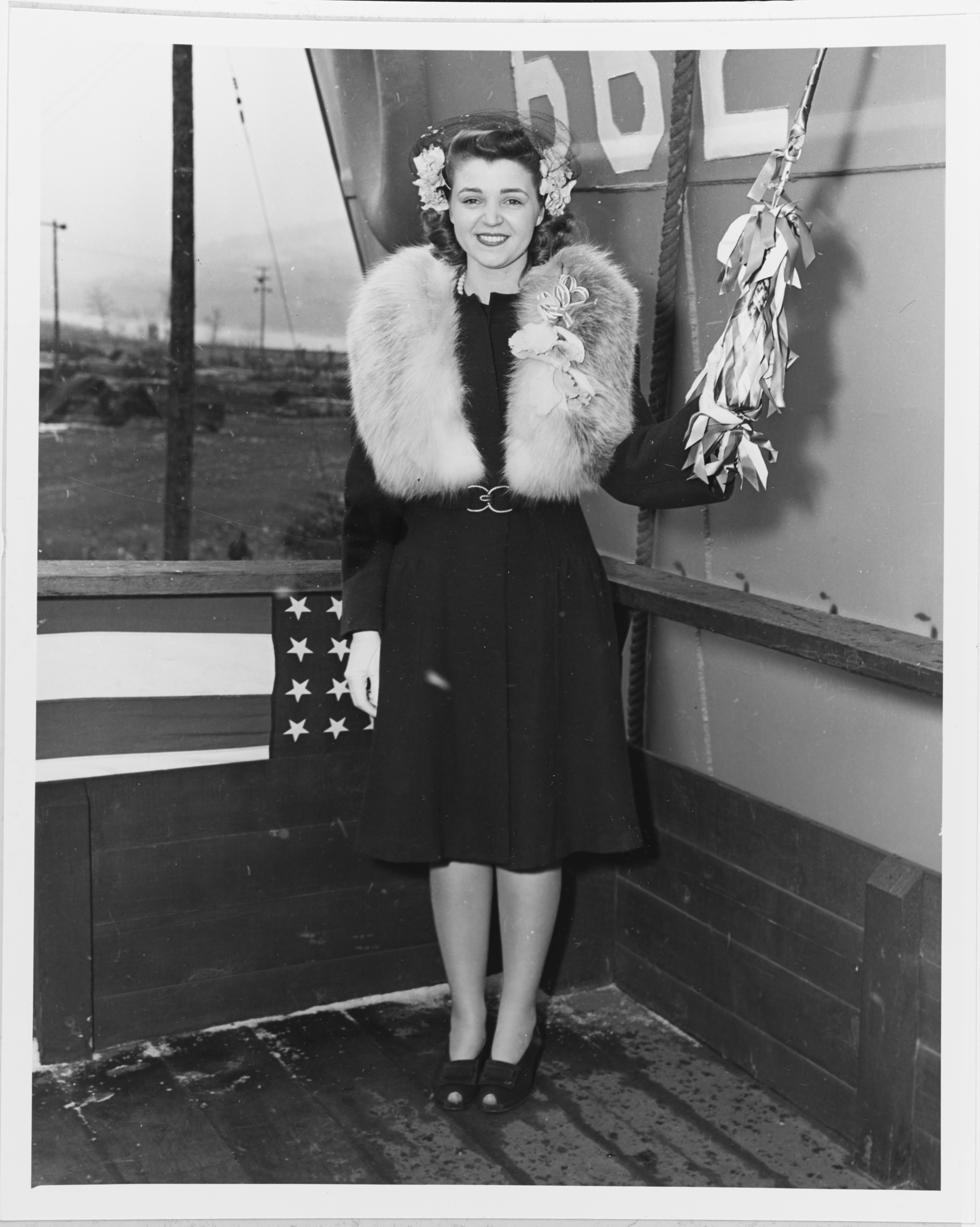
Miss Louise Leahy poses with the christening bottle

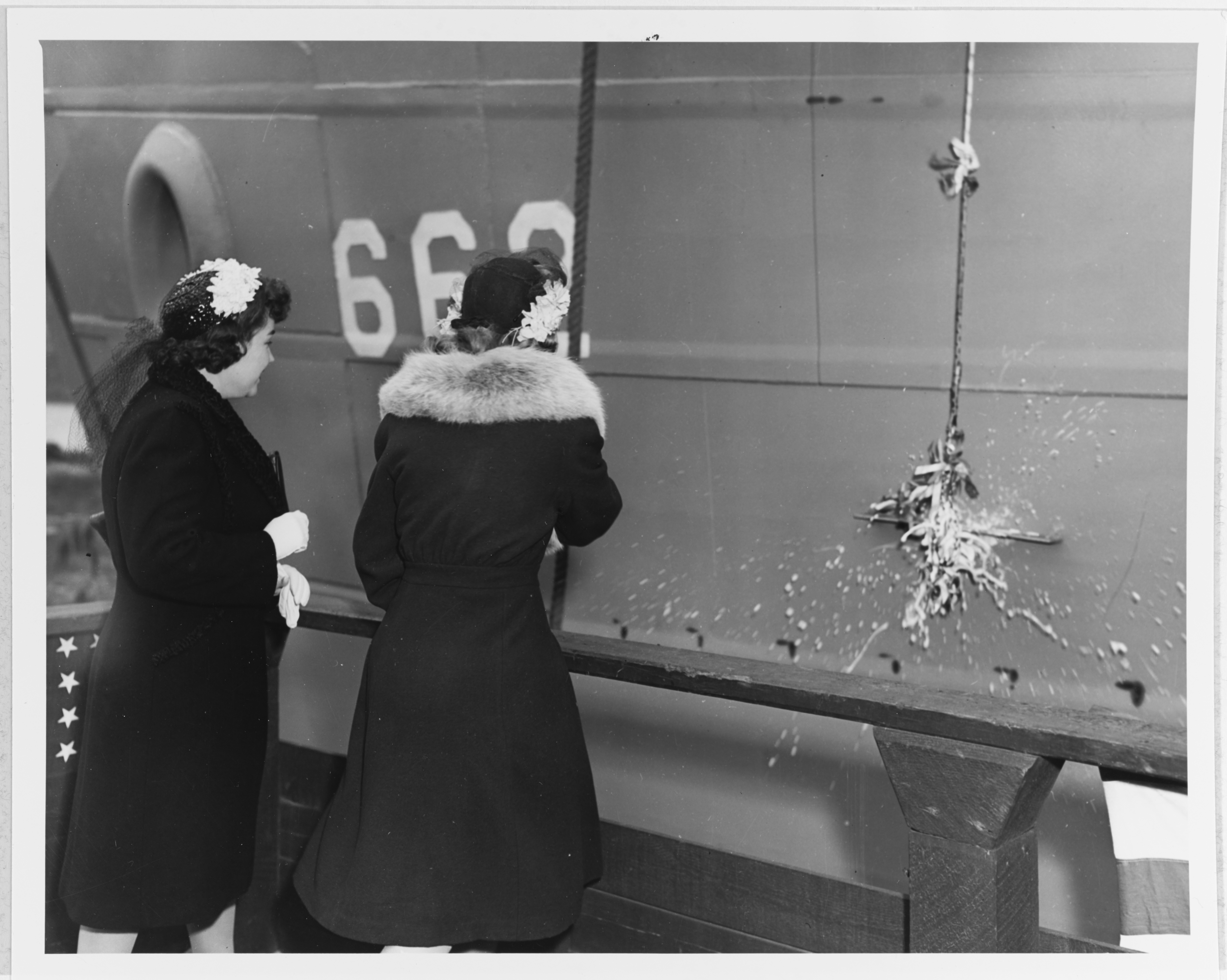
Miss Louise Leahy christens LST-662

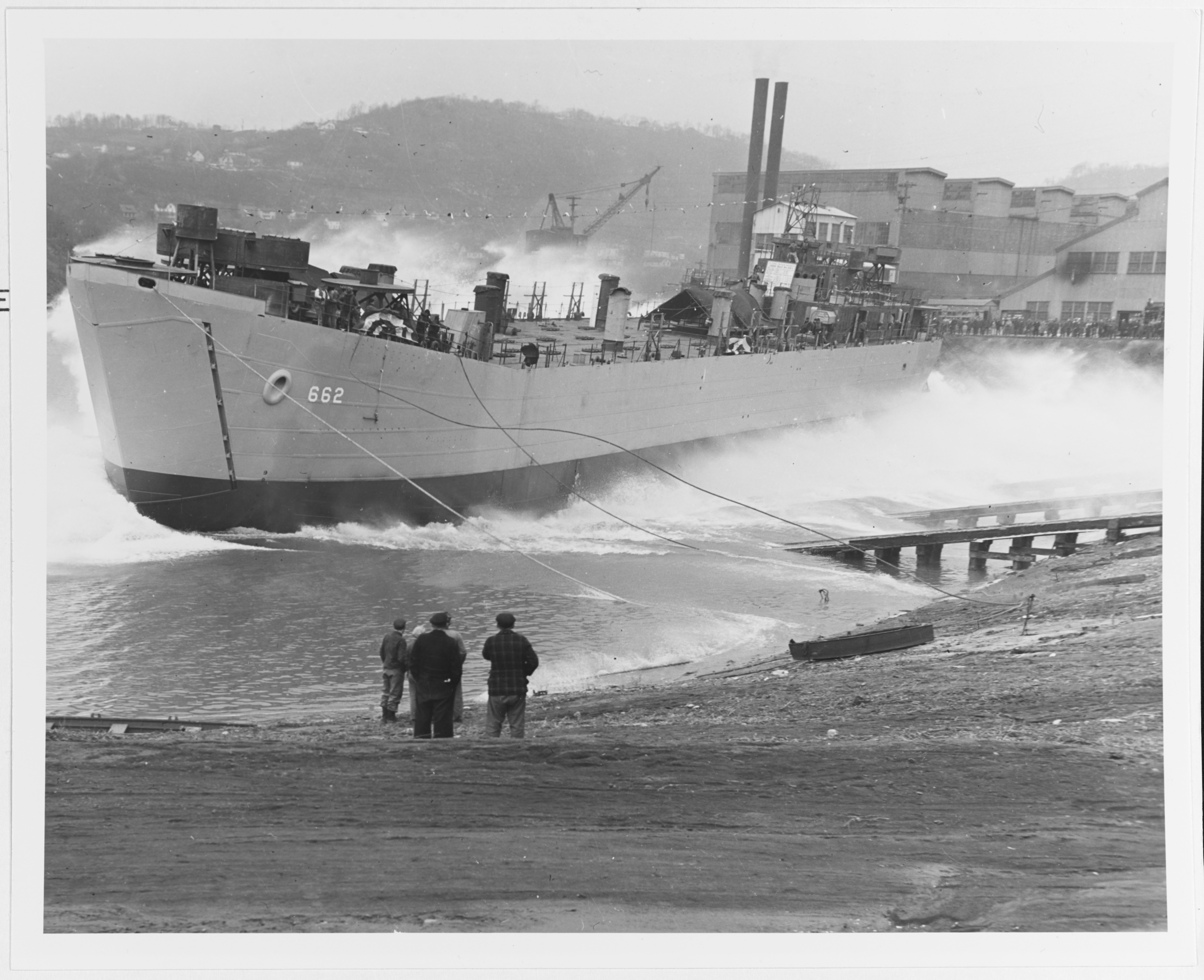
LST-662 slides into the Ohio River

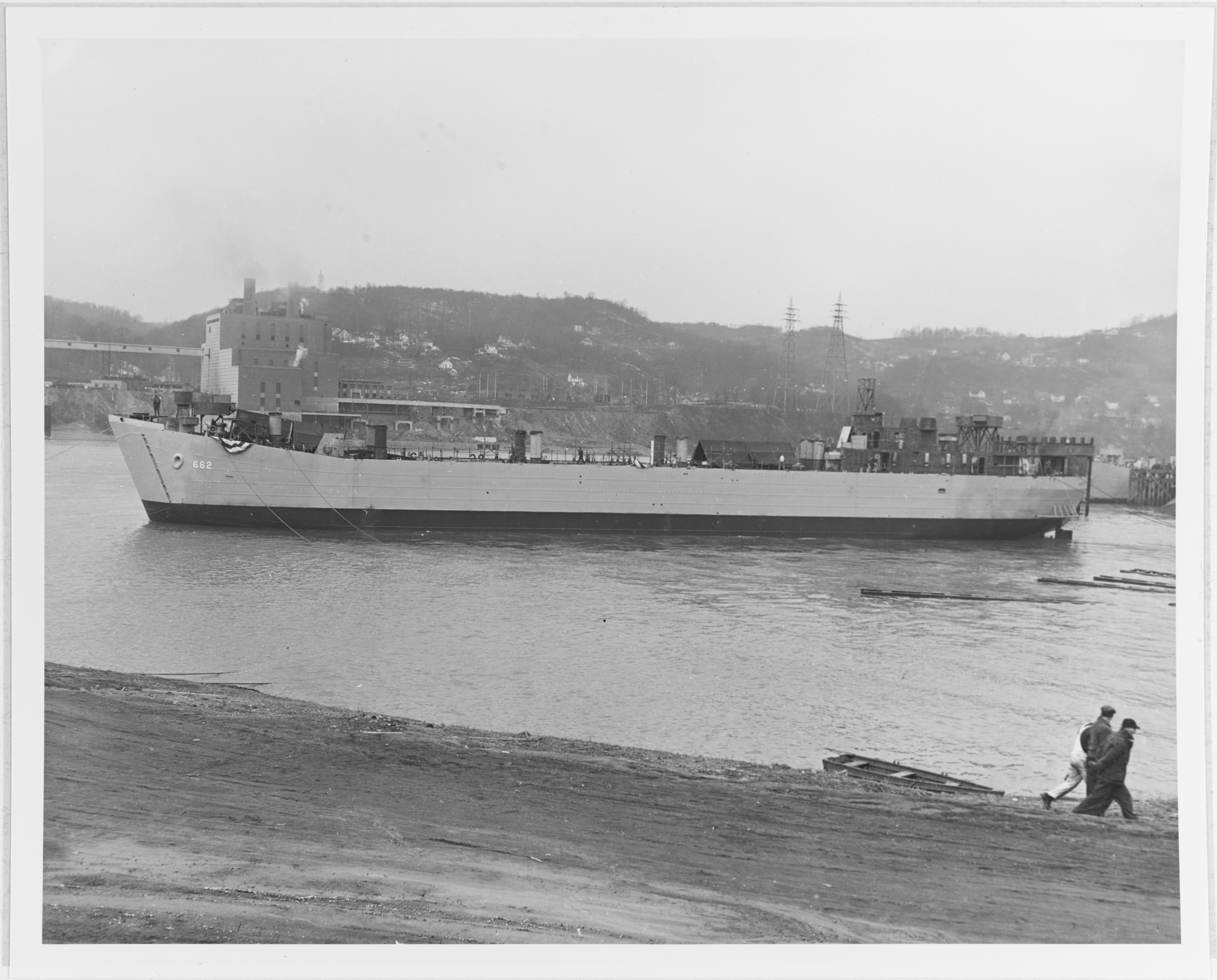
USS LST-662 afloat just after launching
