= USS ARD-9 =

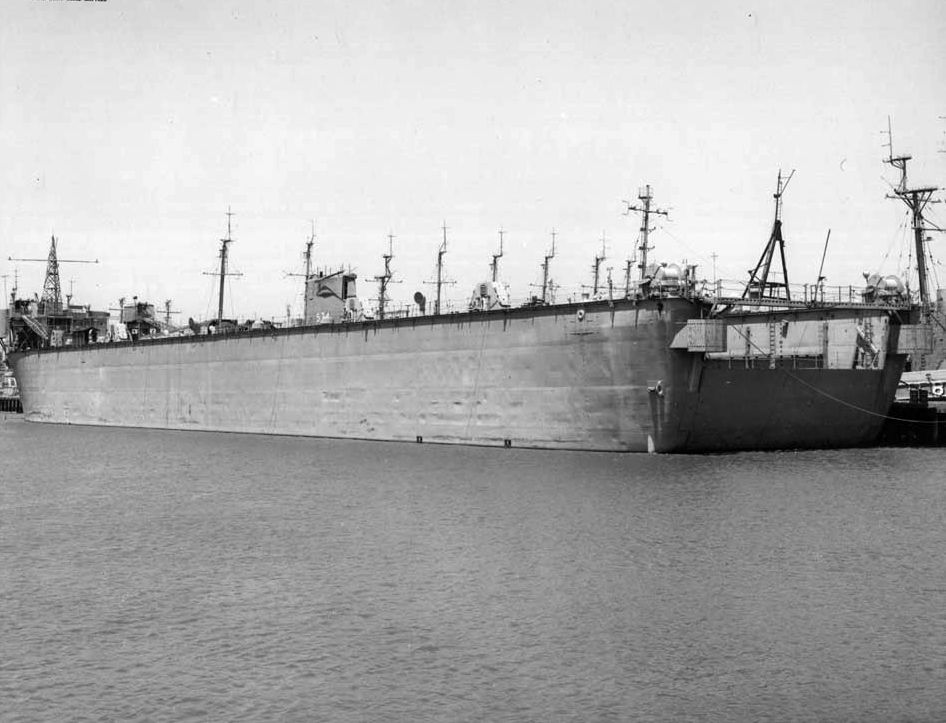
- USS ARD-9's sister ship USS ARD-10 at Mare Island Navy Yard

History

United States
- Name: USS ARD-9
- Builder: Pacific Bridge Company
- Commissioned: 23 September 1943
- Fate: Transferred to the Republic of China, October 1967
- Stricken: 15 April 1976

Taiwan
- Name: ROCS Wo Fu (ARDS-5)
- Acquired: October 1968
- Decommissioned: 1 November 2013
- Fate: Broken up, 2014

General characteristics
- Class & type: ARD-2-class auxiliary repair dock
- Displacement: 4,200 tons (light)
- Length: 482 ft 7 in (147.09 m)
- Beam: 71 ft (22 m)
- Draft: 5 ft (1.5 m)
- Complement: 131
- Armament: 2 x 20 mm

USS ARD-9 was an auxiliary repair dock serving with the United States Navy during World War II as Auxiliary floating drydock. Built by the Pacific Bridge Company.

ARD-9 was commissioned at Alameda, California on 25 September 1943, towed to San Francisco Bay, and anchored near the Floating Drydock Training Center at Tiburon, California. She had 5 dockings before leaving the United States.

ARD-9 left the US on 12 December 1943 in a convoy of 5 ships: An AK ship, the Navy tug USS Yuma towing the USS ARD-10, and the Metamora, a Merchant Marine tug towing the ARD-9. At sea, the ship headed SSW and crossed the equator at 151 degrees and 50 minutes. She was 56 days at sea without seeing land. As the convoy entered the Coral Sea it was given an escort by an Australian corvette. The ARD-10 then left the convoy and went on to Fremantle. ARD-9 anchored at Naval Base Milne Bay, in Milne Bay, New Guinea on 6 February 1944.

She was sold to the Republic of China in 1976, where she served as Wo Fu (ARDS-5).

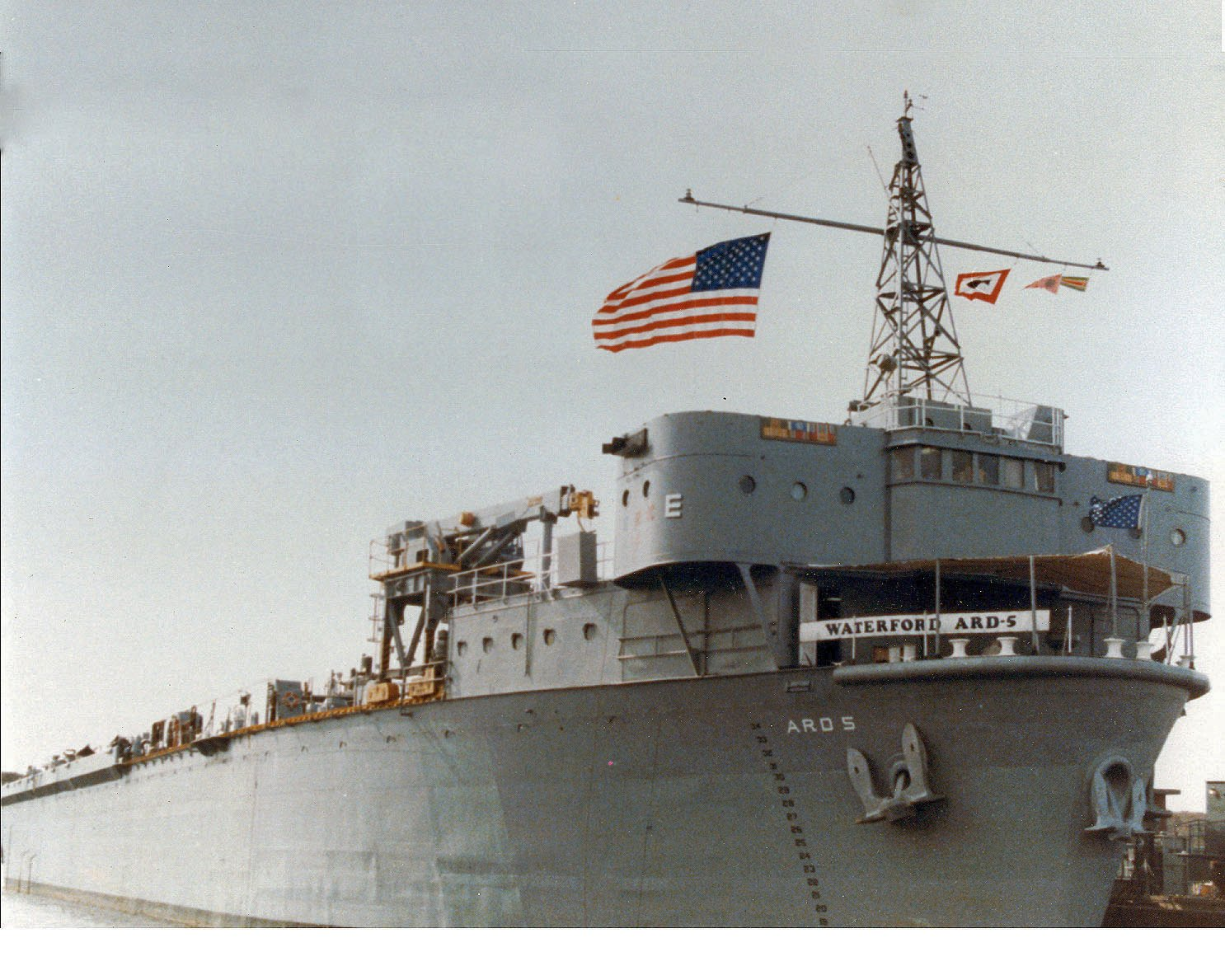
ARD-9 sister ship USS Waterford (ARD-5)
