= Auxiliary repair dock =

Floating drydock

An auxiliary repair dock (ARD) is a type of floating drydock employed by the U.S. Navy, especially during World War II. The Navy commissioned 33 ARD vessels: ARD-1 through ARD-33. ARDs were self-sustaining in World War II. ARDs have a rudder to help in tow moving, making ARDs very mobile, and have a bow to cut through waves. ARDs have a stern that can be opened or closed. The stern can be closed with bottom-hinged flap gate, operated by hydraulic rams. This stern gate can be lowered for ship entrance into the submerged dock, and then closed to keep out waves. ARDs were built by the Pacific Bridge Company, in Alameda, California.

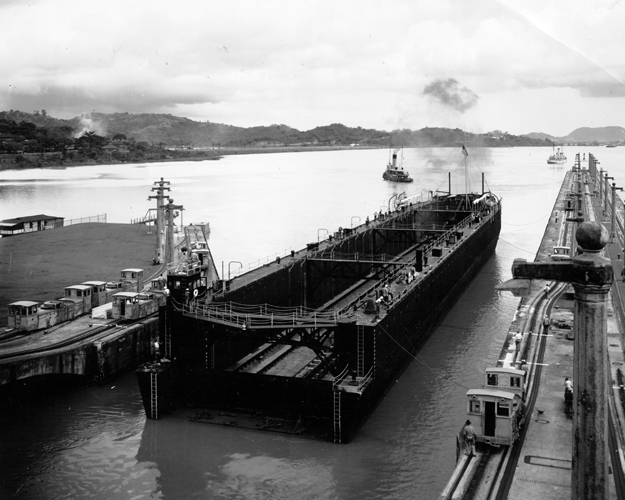
USS ARD-1 under tow by USS Bridge 28 October 1934.

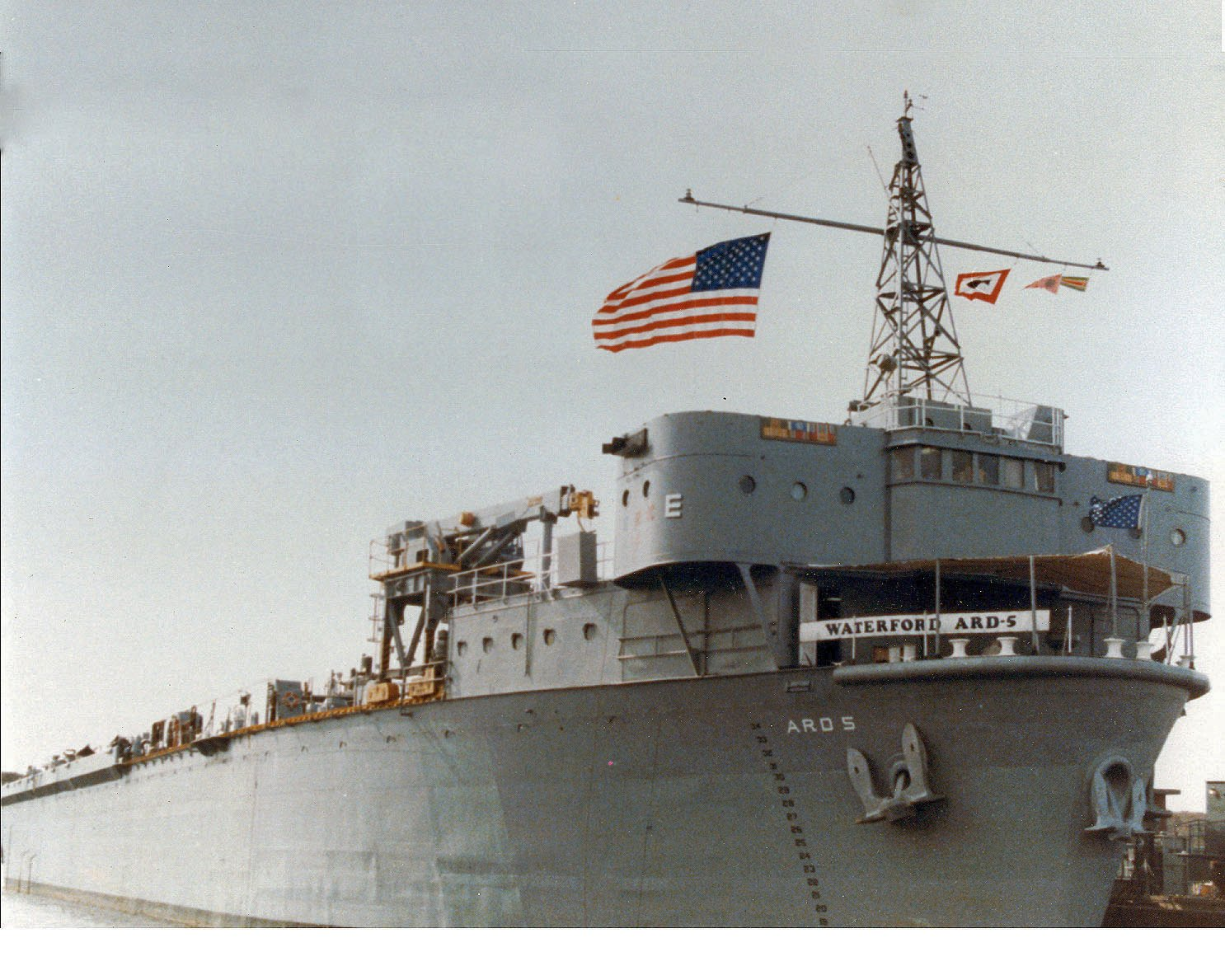
USS Waterford (ARD-5)

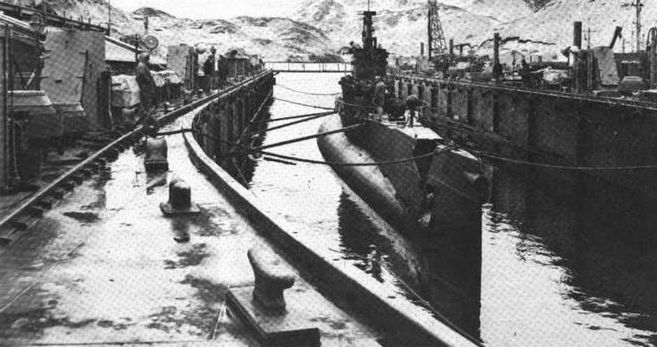
ARD-6 submerged at Dutch Harbor Alaska with Sub USS S-46 for repair 1944

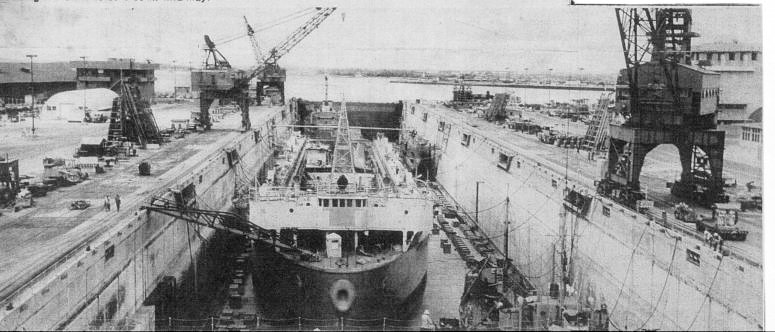
USS Arco (ARD-29) a land drydocked at Naval Shipyard Pearl Harbor in Drydock Number Four for repairs in April 1951.

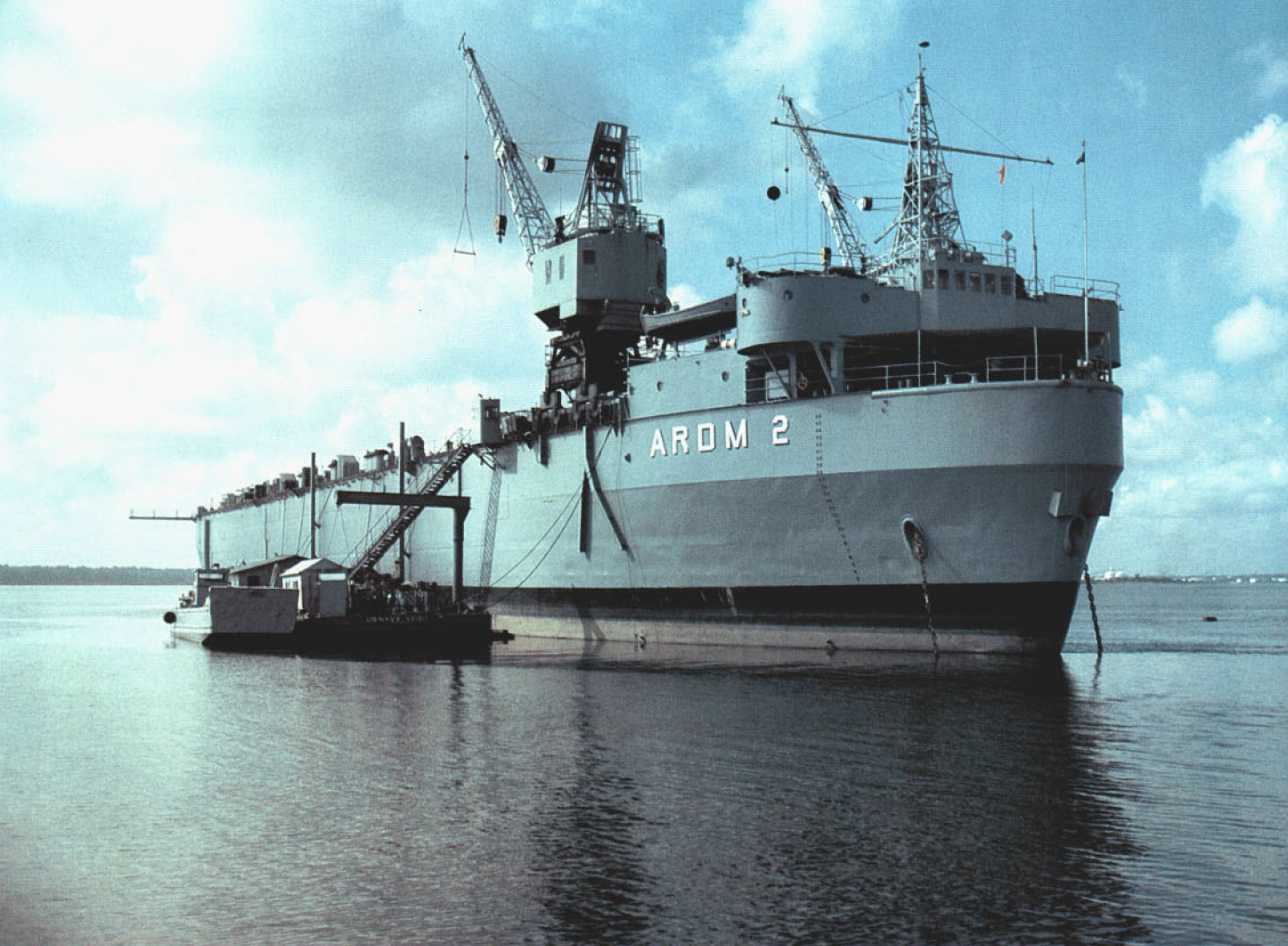
USS Alamogordo (ARDM-2) at anchor on the Cooper River, Charleston, SC

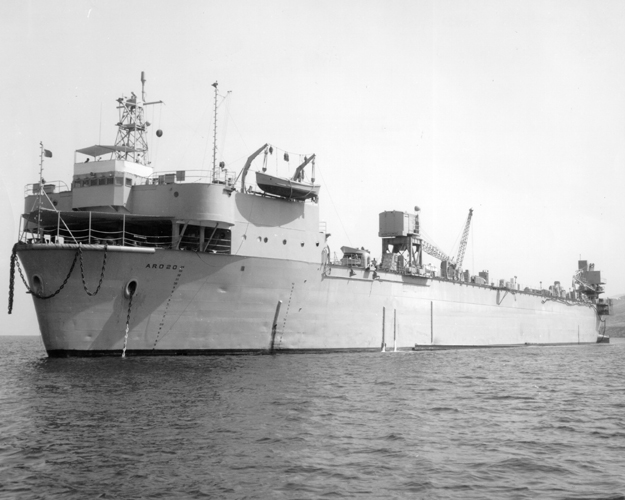
USS White Sands (ARD-20)

== Primary use ==
The Auxiliary repair dock was a type of Auxiliary floating drydock, which could, by design, provide drydock facilities to damaged Navy vessels. Floating drydocks of this type were approximately 500-foot (150 m) long and weighted about 5,000 tons. The first auxiliary repair dock was the USS ARD-1, built by the Pacific Bridge Company and completed in September 1934. ARD-1 was 393 feet and 6 inches (119.94 m) long, and could lift 2200 tons. ARD-1 was so successful that 30 ARDs were built, most completed between 1942 and 1944. ARD-2 and the next five ARD docks were larger at 3500 tons. and 485'8" (148.0m) long. ARD-1 was taken to a forward Naval base at Kerama Retto, Okinawa Island, to repair the many ships damaged by kamikaze attacks. ARD-1 made many temporary repairs to get ships back into action. Many other ARDs joined ARD-1 in this important task. This minimized the time ships were out of action for repairs.

== Drydock facility ==
Floating drydocks, both ARDs and some other types, are capable of flooding themselves to partially submerge underwater, opening up a stern door to permit a damaged vessel to enter. Once the damaged vessel was above the floating drydock, the door was closed and water was pumped out of the floating drydock, permitting repair work to be performed on the damaged vessel. Such work in battle areas was often of a temporary nature, primarily to return the damaged vessel to seaworthy condition.

Once the damaged vessel was sufficiently repaired, the floating drydock was flooded, the door opened, and the repaired vessel allowed to depart for further duty or assignment.

== Personnel capabilities ==
While the damaged vessel was being repaired, the drydock was capable of providing the crew of the damaged ship with temporary necessities, such as meals, laundry, some supplies, and, in a limited number of cases, berthing for crew members. (When possible, the crew of the damaged ship remained on their ship while structural repair was being accomplished.)

== Ships in class ==
- USS ARD-1 (displacement of 2200 tons) (Built in 1933) (only one in class)
- USS ARD-2 sold in 1963
- USS ARD-3 sold 1999
- USS ARD-4 sold 1961
  - ARD-2-class 410 feet long, 49 feet, 4 inches wide, ARD-5 to 11:
- USS Waterford (ARD-5)
- USS ARD-6 sold 1961
- USS West Milton (ARD-7) Scrapped in 1992
- USS ARD-8 sold 1961
- USS ARD-9 sold 1977
- USS ARD-10 sold, scrapped in 2014
- USS ARD-11 sold 1977
  - ARD-2-class wide: 410 feet long, 49 feet, 4 inches 59 feet, 3 inches wide, ARD 12 to 32:
- USS ARD-12 sold 1987
- USS ARD-13 sold 1977
- USS ARD-14 sold 1980
- USS ARD-15 sold 1971
- USS ARD-16 by Pacific Bridge, sold moved to Mobile AL
- USS ARD-17 sold 1971
- USS Endurance ARD-18 ARDM 3, laid up at Charleston Naval Shipyard
- USS Oak Ridge ARD-19 ARDM 1, to United States Coast Guard in 2002
- USS White Sands ARD-20 by Pacific Bridge Co., (changed to AGDS-1), sold 1974
- USS ARD-21 reserve
- USS Windsor (ARD-22) sold 1976
- USS ARD-23 sold 1992
- USS ARD-24 sold 1982
- USS ARD-25 sold 1973
- USS Alamogordo ARD-26 sold 2000
- USS ARD-27 Scrapped in 1974
- USS ARD-28 sold renamed Capitan Rodriguez Zamora
- USS Arco ARD-29 sold to Iran 1971
- USS San Onfre (ARD-30) by Pacific Bridge Co.
- USS ARD-31 To US Air Force in 1974
- USS ARD-32 sold 1960
- USS ARD-33 (By Dravo Corp.) renamed AFDL 47 Reliance

== See also ==
- Drydock
- Semi-submersible
