= USS Arco =

Two ships of the United States Navy have been named Arco for Arco, Idaho.

- USS Arco (ARD-29) was an auxiliary repair dock, originally named USS ARD-29, later loaned, then sold, to Iran.
- Arco (ARDM-5) is an ARDM-1-class floating dry dock, currently in service.
