= ARDM =

ARDM may refer to:

- ArDM or Argon Dark Matter Experiment, a particle physics experiment
- U.S. Hull classification symbol for Medium Auxiliary Repair Docks
  - ARDM-1
  - ARDM-2
  - ARDM-3
  - ARDM-4
  - ARDM-5
