= USS ARD-1 =

WWII American auxiliary repair dock

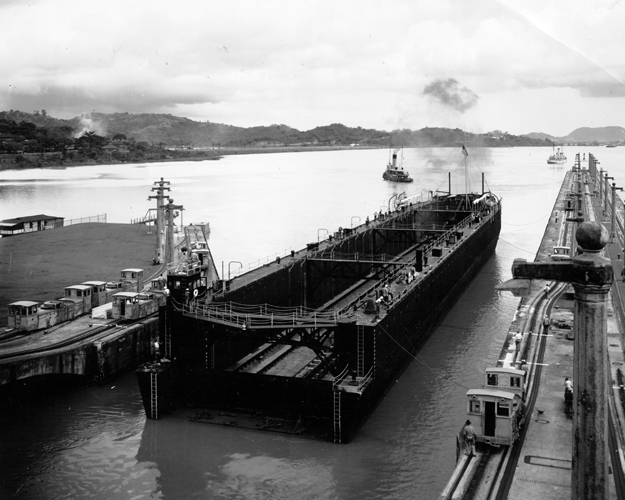
- USS ARD-1 under tow by USS Bridge 28 October 1934.

History

United States
- Name: USS ARD-1
- Builder: Pacific Bridge Company
- Laid down: 1933
- Launched: September 1934
- Commissioned: 19 December 1935

General characteristics
- Class & type: ARD-1-class auxiliary repair dock
- Displacement: 2,200 tons (light)
- Length: 393 ft 6 in (119.94 m)
- Propulsion: none, towed
- Complement: 131
- Notes: First ARD - Auxiliary Repair Dock

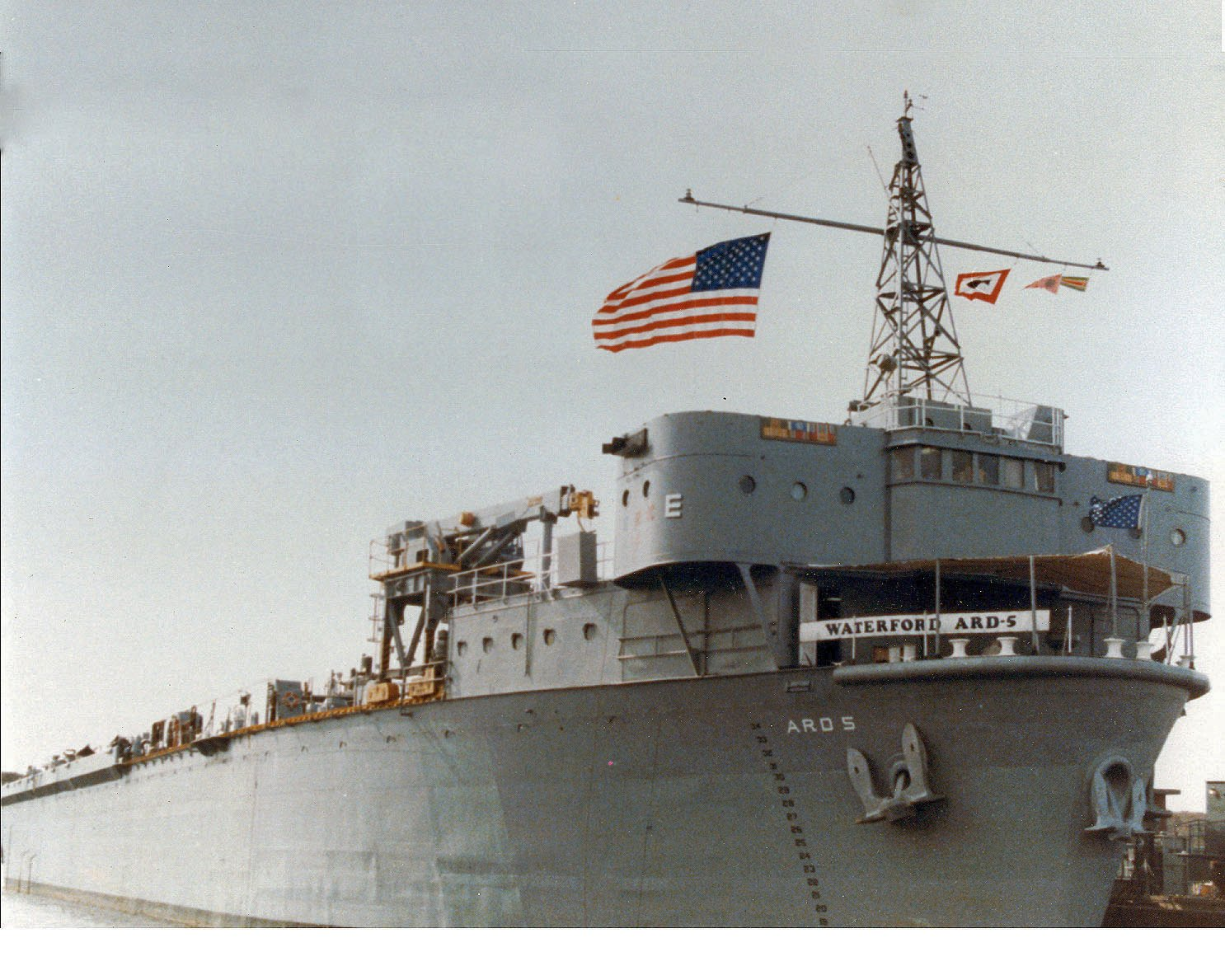
ARD-1 larger sister ship the USS Waterford (ARD-5)

USS ARD-1 was an auxiliary repair dock serving with the United States Navy during World War II as Auxiliary floating drydock. ARD-1 was built by the Pacific Bridge Company and completed in September 1934. ARD-1 was commissioned at Alameda, California on 19 December 1935 then towed to San Diego, California. ARD-1 was the first in her class of self-sustaining, ship hull shape ship repair docks. ARD-1 was able to repair ships in a Naval fleet in remote locations.

== Background and design ==
USS ARD-1 was the third steel floating drydock built for the US Navy. The first two were the YFD-2 built in 1901 and the USS Dewey built in 1905. While these two floating drydocks worked very well, they proved to be not very mobile. Both proved to be difficult to tow, as both lacked bows to cut though waves. A new design was needed, or as it turned out an older design made new. In the past wood ships hulls with no interior were used to drydock smaller ships that could fit into the drydock ship. This design, but with a steel ship hull, was needed. The repair dock would have new modern steel ballast pontoons tanks that could be flooded with water to submerge the dock or pumped dry to raise a ship in need of repair. Between 1920 and 1930, the US Navy Bureau of Yards and Docks made numerous studies of various types of mobile docks of both signal unit and sectional types. The best was a one-piece dock, ship-shaped in form, with a molded closed bow and a stern that could be opened or closed. The stern could be closed with bottom-hinged flap gate, that was operated by hydraulic rams. This stern gate could lowered for ship entrance into the submerged dock and then closed to keep out wave. ARD-1 did not need a completely calm bay to operate. The new ARD-1 would be self-sustaining and have a rudder to help in tow moving, making ARD-1 very mobile. The ARD was raised by pumping water out of the ballast compartments and the main ship basin. ARDs would be equipped with a diesel-electric power plant, a pumping plant, repair shops, and crew's accommodations. ARD-1 was the first drydock that was self-sustaining enough to join a fleet into remote waters. ARD-1 could lift ships of up to 2200 tons, thus repair small crafts, tugs, small destroyers and small submarines. The design was so good that 30 ARDs docks were built, most completed between 1942 and 1944. The need to repair large ships and subs meant the following ARDs were designed somewhat larger. Other improvements also were made from what was learned from ARD-1. ARDs were deployed throughout the world during the World War II.

== USS ARD-1 World War II ==
ARD-1 was towed to Naval Base San Diego for testing in 1936. There one of ships repaired was the USS Aylwin (DD-355) a 1,375 tons 341 ft 3 in (104.01 m) long Farragut-class destroyer was repaired in 1938. The ARD-1 was next towed to Pearl Harbor, there ARD-1 demonstrating its effectiveness.

A few of the ships repaired in ARD-1:

- USS Pyro (AE-24) a Nitro-class ammunition ship was repaired.
- USS Monssen (DD-436) (DD-436)repaired on 31 March 1942
- USS Safeguard (ARS-25) was repaired.
- USS Spectacle (AM-305) was repaired after kamikaze attack on 22 May 1945. ARD-1 was taken to a forward Naval base at Kerama Retto, Okinawa Island to repair the many ships damaged by kamikaze attacks. ARD-1 made many temporarily repairs to get ships back into action. Many other ARDs joined ARD-1 in this important task. This minimized the time ships were out of action for repairs.

== Post War ==
On 21 October 1946 ARD-1 was decommissioned and moved back to the United States. In 1950s ARD-1 was towed to the Portsmouth Naval Shipyard near the city of Portsmouth, New Hampshire, and used for the repairing of small submarines.
