= USS Ruchamkin =

Crosley-class high-speed transport

Coordinates: 4.949041°N 73.963528°W

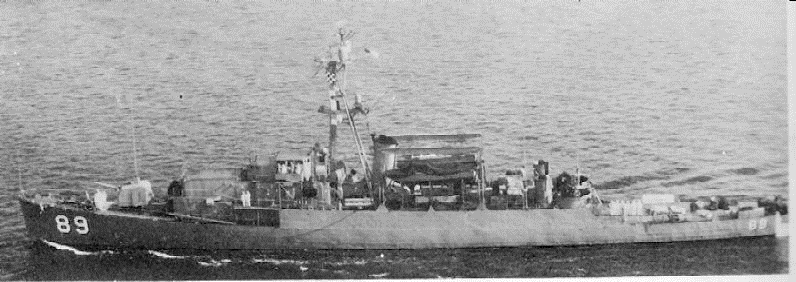
- USS Ruchamkin ca. 1965

History

United States
- Name: USS Ruchamkin
- Namesake: Seymour D. Ruchamkin
- Builder: Philadelphia Navy Yard, Philadelphia; Duane Shipbuilding Corporation
- Laid down: 14 February 1944 as Rudderow-class destroyer escort
- Launched: 15 June 1944
- Sponsored by: Mrs. Mary Ruchamkin
- Identification: DE-228
- Commissioned: 16 September 1945
- Decommissioned: 27 February 1946
- Reclassified: APD-89, 17 July 1944
- Recommissioned: 9 March 1951
- Decommissioned: 13 August 1957
- Recommissioned: 18 November 1961
- Reclassified: LPR-89, 1 January 1969
- Decommissioned: 24 November 1969
- Stricken: 31 October 1977
- Honors and awards: Navy Unit Commendation for 1965 Dominican crisis
- Fate: Transferred to Colombia, 24 November 1969

Colombia
- Name: ARC Córdoba
- Acquired: 24 November 1969
- Stricken: 1980
- Identification: DT-15
- Status: Museum ship at Jaime Duque Park

General characteristics
- Class & type: Crosley-class high speed transport
- Displacement: 2,130 long tons (2,164 t) full
- Length: 306 ft (93 m)
- Beam: 37 ft (11 m)
- Draft: 12 ft 7 in (3.84 m)
- Speed: 23 knots (43 km/h; 26 mph)
- Troops: 162
- Complement: 204
- Armament: 1 × 5-inch/38 caliber gun (127 mm); 6 × 40 mm guns; 6 × 20 mm guns; 2 × depth charge tracks
- Notes: 2 mark 37 torpedo tubes

USS Ruchamkin (APD-89), ex-DE-228, later LPR-89, was a United States Navy high-speed transport in commission from 1945 to 1946, from 1951 to 1957, and from 1961 to 1969. She subsequently served as ARC Córdoba (DT 15) in the Colombian Navy, until 1980; although scrapped, her hull and superstructure were re-erected in a leisure park near Bogotá.

== Namesake ==
Seymour David Ruchamkin was born on 8 March 1912 in New York City. He graduated from UCLA in 1940 and shortly thereafter, on 13 July 1940, enlisted in the United States Naval Reserve. Appointed midshipman on 16 September 1940, he attended the United States Naval Reserve Midshipman School at Northwestern University in Evanston, Illinois, and reported to the destroyer USS Cushing on 24 January 1941.

On 13 November 1942, Lieutenant, junior grade, Ruchamkin was killed in action against Imperial Japanese Navy forces in Ironbottom Sound off Savo Island in the Solomon Islands during the Naval Battle of Guadalcanal. He was posthumously awarded the Navy Cross.

== Construction and commissioning ==
Ruchamkin was laid down as the Rudderow-class destroyer escort USS Ruchamkin (DE-228) on 14 February 1944 by the Philadelphia Navy Yard at Philadelphia, Pennsylvania, and was launched on 15 June 1944, sponsored by Mrs. Mary Ruchamkin. The ship was reclassified as a Crosley-class high-speed transport and redesignated APD-89 on 17 July 1944. After conversion to her new role by the Duane Shipbuilding Corporation, she was commissioned on 16 September 1945.

== First period in commission, 1945–1946 ==
After shakedown, Ruchamkin engaged in training exercises off the United States East Coast and in the Caribbean. She was decommissioned at Green Cove Springs, Florida, on 27 February 1946 and placed in reserve there on the St. Johns River in the Florida Group of the Atlantic Reserve Fleet.

== Second period in commission, 1951–1957 ==
After five years of inactivity, Ruchamkin was recommissioned on 9 March 1951. Based at Naval Amphibious Base Little Creek in Virginia Beach, Virginia, she participated in amphibious warfare training operations off Puerto Rico during the summer and autumn of 1951, then, in January 1952, departed Norfolk, Virginia, for her first Mediterranean deployment with the United States Sixth Fleet.

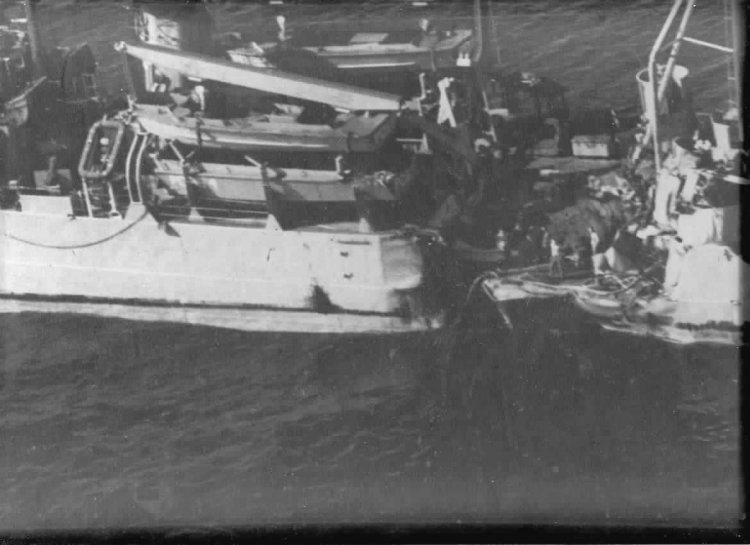
Damage to Ruchamkin after her 14 November 1952 collision with the merchant tanker Washington.

Further amphibious exercises off the U.S. East Coast followed her return from Sixth Fleet duty, and, in August 1952, she conducted her first midshipman training cruise. Three months later, on 14 November 1952, while involved in fleet exercises off the Virginia Capes, she collided with the merchant tanker Washington. Hit portside in the troop compartment area, Ruchamkin lost seven of the troops embarked for the exercise.

After repairs at Norfolk and refresher training off Cuba during April 1953, Ruchamkin resumed amphibious training duties. For the next year, she trained with United States Marines off the Virginia Capes and the Carolina capes and off Puerto Rico. In July 1954, she conducted another Naval Reserve Officer Training Corps midshipman training cruise.

Ruchamkin departed Norfolk on 5 January 1955 bound for the United States West Coast. She transited the Panama Canal and on 23 January 1955 arrived at San Diego, California. For the next three months she participated in amphibious training exercises with units of the United States Pacific Fleet.

In early May 1955, Ruchamkin retransited the Panama Canal and steamed for her new home port, Boston, Massachusetts. She arrived there on 27 May 1955, assumed duties as a United States Naval Reserve training ship, and for two years trained naval reservists of the 1st Naval District in port and at sea on weekend, two-week, and month-long cruises.

Designated for inactivation in the spring of 1957, Ruchamkin was decommissioned on 13 August 1957 and berthed at Boston in reserve.

== Third period in commission, 1961–1969 ==
Ruchamkin was ordered reactivated in August 1961 to increase the U.S. Navy's troop lift capacity during the Berlin Crisis of 1961. Recommissioned on 18 November 1961 and assigned to Amphibious Squadron 10, she completed shakedown and repairs and in April 1962 participated in a demonstration landing for President John F. Kennedy and subsequent antisubmarine warfare and amphibious exercises in Puerto Rican waters.

Based again at Little Creek, Ruchamkin returned to a schedule of U.S. East Coast and Caribbean exercises, the latter usually of two to three months' duration.

In November 1963, Ruchamkin's schedule was interrupted for Fleet Rehabilitation and Modernization (FRAM) at the Norfolk Shipbuilding and Drydock Company. The FRAM II overhaul was completed in June 1964, and she resumed her duties as primary control vessel in ship-to-shore amphibious movements, transport for underwater demolition teams and beach reconnaissance personnel, and antisubmarine warfare screening unit.

In October 1964, Ruchamkin moved east to the coast of Spain, where she controlled the major portion of ship-to-shore movement during Operation Steel Pike I, the largest amphibious exercise since World War II. In November 1964 she returned to Little Creek and resumed amphibious and antisubmarine warfare exercises along the U.S. East Coast and in the Caribbean.

In late April and early May 1965, Ruchamkin was called on to assist in the evacuation of civilians from the strife-torn Dominican Republic to San Juan, Puerto Rico. She then returned to the western coast of Hispaniola for patrol and hydrographic survey duties. For her work during the Dominican Crisis, she was awarded the Navy Unit Commendation.

During the summer of 1965, Ruchamkin returned to a more normal schedule of exercises, but, from February to April 1966, interrupted those operations to act as primary support ship for four fleet ballistic missile submarines which were test firing Polaris submarine-launched ballistic missiles off the Florida coast.

In October 1966, Hurricane Inez interrupted Caribbean exercises and Ruchamkin, assigned to relief operations, distributed food supplies to survivors in Haiti.

During 1967 and into 1968, Ruchamkin continued her operations in the western Atlantic Ocean. Then on 27 July 1968, she headed east for a four-month deployment in the Mediterranean. There until the end of November 1968, she conducted hydrographic surveys along the coasts of southern Europe and North Africa. She was reassigned to Amphibious Squadron 6 while deployed to the Mediterranean.

Ruchamkin was reclassified as an "amphibious transport, small", and redesignated LPR-89 on 1 January 1969. After Caribbean exercises in February and March 1969, Ruchamkin was assigned to support search operations being conducted by auxiliary repair dock USS White Sands, fleet ocean tug USS Apache, and the deep-diving bathyscaphe Trieste II off the Azores for the sunken nuclear submarine USS Scorpion. In late August 1969, she moved north, conducted hydrographic survey operations in the North Sea until 20 October 1969, then headed back to Little Creek.

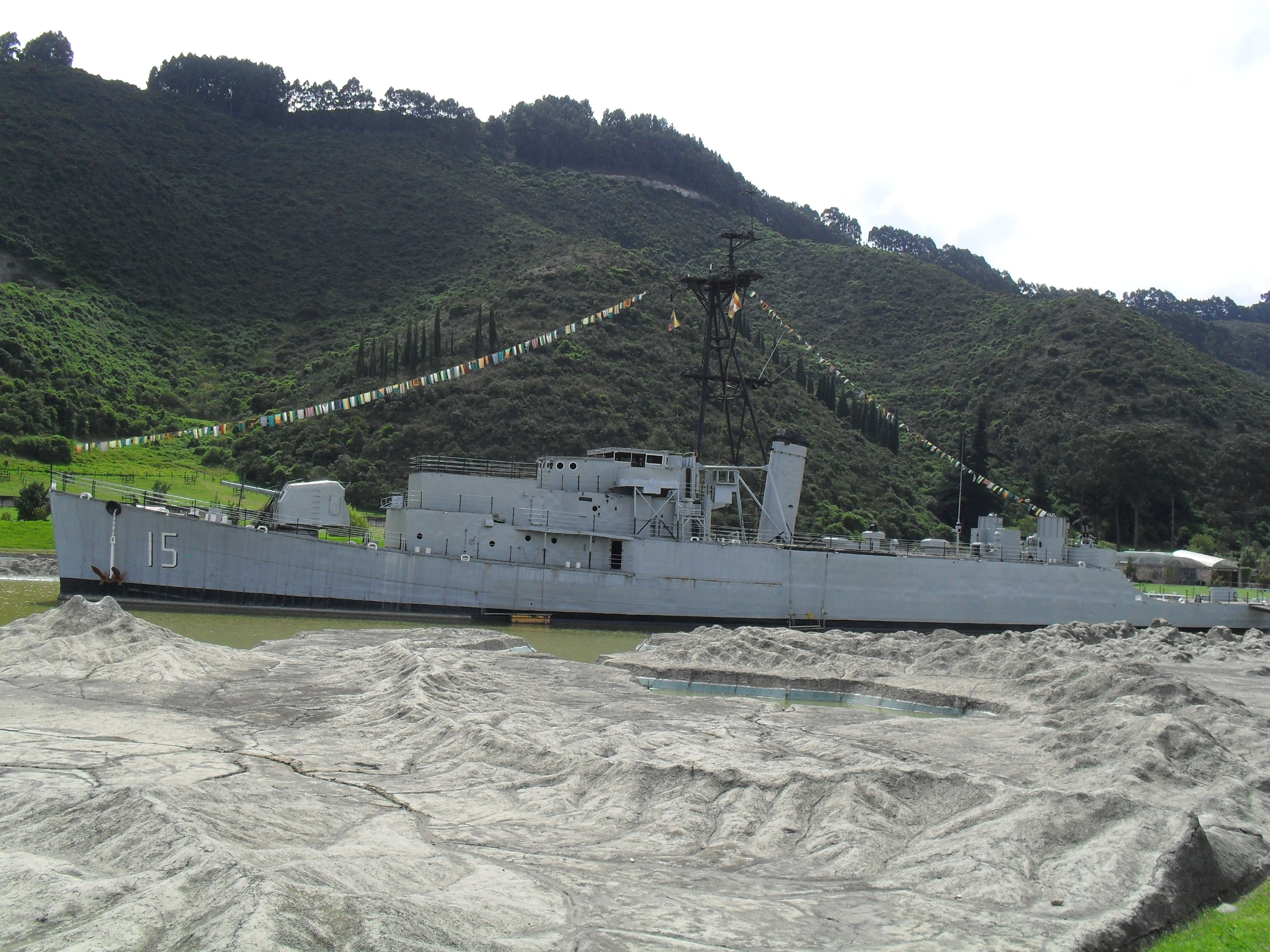
ARC Córdoba, ex USS Ruchamkin on exhibition in Jaime Duque Park, Tocancipá, Colombia

== Final decommissioning and disposal ==
Ruchamkin was decommissioned at Little Creek on 24 November 1969 for immediate foreign transfer. She eventually was stricken from the Naval Vessel Register on 31 October 1977.

== Colombian Navy service ==
Ruchamkin was turned over to Colombia under the terms of the Military Assistance Program on 24 November 1969, the day of her final U.S. Navy decommissioning. She was commissioned in the Colombian Navy the same day as ARC Córdoba (DT-15) and served until retirement in 1980. She subsequently was scrapped, although Córdoba's hull and superstructure were saved and re-erected at the Jaime Duque amusement park at Tocancipá, near Bogotá.
