= USS Apache (ATF-67) =

Tugboat of the United States Navy

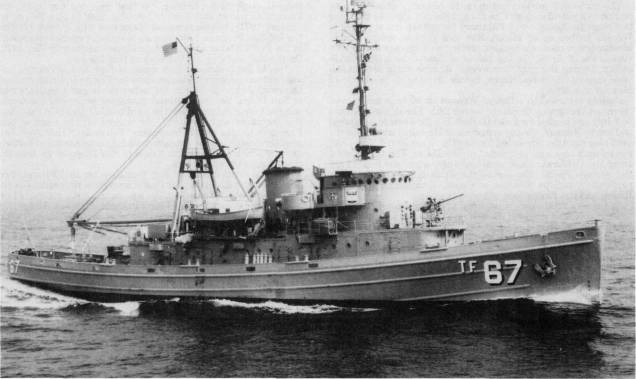
- USS Apache underway off Southern California on 31 August 1964

History

United States
- Name: USS Apache
- Namesake: Apache
- Builder: Charleston Shipbuilding and Drydock Company, Charleston, South Carolina
- Laid down: 8 November 1941
- Launched: 8 May 1942
- Sponsored by: Mrs. G. E. Baker
- Commissioned: 12 December 1942
- Reclassified: ATF-67, 15 May 1944
- Decommissioned: 3 December 1946
- Recommissioned: 20 July 1951
- Decommissioned: 27 February 1974
- Stricken: 30 March 1974
- Honors and awards: World War II: 5 battle stars; 1 Navy Unit Commendation; Korean War: 2 battle stars; Vietnam War: 1 campaign star; 1 Navy Unit Commendation; 1 Meritorious Unit Commendation
- Fate: Sold to Republic of China, 1 June 1974, currently Active.

History

Taiwan
- Name: ROCS Ta Wan (ATF-551)
- Acquired: 1 June 1974
- Status: Active

General characteristics
- Class & type: Navajo-class fleet tug
- Displacement: 1,235 long tons (1,255 t) light; 1,674 long tons (1,701 t) full load
- Length: 205 ft (62 m)
- Beam: 38 ft 6 in (11.73 m)
- Draft: 15 ft 4 in (4.67 m)
- Depth of hold: 3,600 shaft horsepower (4.8 megawatts)
- Propulsion: Diesel-electric: Four General Motors 12-278A diesel engines driving four General Electric generators and three General Motors 3-268A auxiliary services engines, single screw
- Speed: 16.5 knots (30.6 km/h; 19.0 mph)
- Complement: 85
- Armament: 1 × 3 in (76 mm) gun mount; 2 × twin 40 mm gun mounts; 2 × single 20 mm gun mounts

USS Apache (AT-67/ATF-67) was a Navajo-class fleet tug, later fleet ocean tug, in commission in the United States Navy from 1942 to 1946 and from 1951 to 1974. She saw service in World War II, the Korean War, and the Vietnam War.

== Construction and commissioning ==
Apache was laid down by the Charleston Shipbuilding and Drydock Company at Charleston, South Carolina, on 8 November 1941 and launched on 8 May 1942; sponsored by Mrs. G. E. Baker. The ship was commissioned as fleet tug USS Apache (AT-67) on 12 December 1942.

== First period in commission, 1942–1946 ==
=== World War II ===
After commissioning, Apache spent the next six weeks training out of Portsmouth, Virginia, and Key West, Florida. In February 1943, she departed Norfolk, Virginia, bound for San Diego, California, where she spent two months engaged in towing operations before departing on 8 May 1943 for New Caledonia. Apache reached Nouméa, New Caledonia, in mid-June 1943 and worked from Nouméa through mid-October 1943, towing and salvaging vessels at Nouméa, Funafuti, and Espiritu Santo.

On 26 October 1943, Apache got underway as part of Task Force 31 for the invasion of Bougainville in the Solomon Islands. The amphibious landings began on 1 November 1943, and Apache supported the Bougainville campaign by assisting grounded vessels to withdraw from the beaches.

Between December 1943 and March 1944, Apache operated throughout the Solomon Islands area. On 17 March 1944, she joined Task Group 31.2 for an assault on Emirau Island in the Bismarck Archipelago and, after completing that assignment, arrived at Guadalcanal on 4 April 1944.

On 15 May 1944, Apache was reclassified as a fleet ocean tug and redesignated ATF-67.

Apache joined Task Group 53.1 on 4 June 1944 to assist in the invasion of Saipan. The force reached the staging area near Kwajalein on 8 June 1944 and departed for the Mariana Islands on 12 June 1944. The invasion of Guam was postponed due to the Battle of the Philippine Sea, and Task Group 53.1 returned to Eniwetok on 28 June 1944. In mid-July 1944, Apache headed back to the Marianas and took part in the preinvasion bombardment of Guam and, after the landings, helped to clear amphibious warfare vessels from the beach. On 21 July 1944, Apache screened the transport area off Guam.

Apache left Guam on 3 August 1944 and served in the Tulagi area for two weeks before beginning repairs alongside a repair ship at Nouméa on 20 August 1944. She operated out of Nouméa through late September 1944 and departed for Auckland, New Zealand, on 23 October 1944. After a brief rest and recreation period at Auckland, Apache returned to Nouméa on 8 November 1944 and operated there for more than a month. On 12 December 1944, she got underway for Hollandia, New Guinea. After two days in port there, she departed for Leyte in the Philippine Islands, and operated there through the end of 1944.

Apache rendezvoused with Task Group 77.6 on 2 January 1945 to take part in the invasion of Lingayen Gulf on Luzon and, for the next few days, she worked under frequent Japanese air attacks. On 5 January 1945, she was attacked by numerous Japanese planes and claimed to have shot down four. One of the planes crashed into Apache's radar mast and exploded off her port bow. Three of her crewmen were wounded, and Apache herself sustained minor material damage, but remained in operation with the task group. On 13 January 1945, she steamed to the aid of escort aircraft carrier USS Salamaua (CVE-96), which had been damaged by a Japanese kamikaze suicide plane, and shepherded Salamaua to Leyte. From there, Apache proceeded to Seeadler Harbor at Manus Island in the Admiralty Islands for repairs.

Apache got underway once again on 24 February 1945, bound for Ulithi Atoll and, for the next two months, operated from Ulithi. On 7 May 1945, Apache took two ships in tow and returned to Leyte. On 21 May 1945, she pushed on toward the Admiralty Islands and departed Manus on 24 May 1945, bound for Hawaii. Apache reached Pearl Harbor, Territory of Hawaii, on 16 June 1945. On 17 June 1945, she departed Pearl Harbor on an independent voyage to San Francisco, California. Upon her arrival, she proceeded to the United Engineering Company at Alameda, California, for repairs.

Her repairs complete, Apache began refresher training at San Pedro, California, on 13 August 1945. On 15 August 1945, the surrender of Japan brought World War II to an end.

=== Postwar ===
In September 1945, Apache reported to San Diego for duty. Until November 1946, she operated along the U.S. West Coast.

On 3 December 1946, Apache was decommissioned and placed in reserve with the Columbia River group of the Pacific Reserve Fleet.

=== World War II honors and awards ===
Apache received five battle stars for her World War II service, for:

- Treasury-Bougainville operation: Occupation and defense of Cape Torokina, 1 November to 15 December 1943
- Consolidation of Solomon Islands: Consolidation of the northern Solomon Islands, December 1943 to March 1944
- Bismarck Archipelago operation: Emirau Island, 17 March 1944
- Marianas operation: Capture and occupation of Guam, mid-July to 3 August 1944
- Luzon operation: Lingayen Gulf landings, 4 January 1945

Apache also received a Navy Unit Commendation for her service with the Salvage, Fire Fighting, and Rescue Unit, Service Force, United States Seventh Fleet in Philippine Islands area, 6 January to 15 February 1945.

== Second period in commission, 1951–1974 ==
=== Recommissioning and early duties ===
Due to the need to expand the fleet caused by 25 June 1950 outbreak of the Korean War, Apache was recommissioned on 20 July 1951. Following a few months of operations on the U.S. West Coast, she was ordered to the Far East and arrived in Sasebo, Japan, in early December 1951.

=== Korean War service ===
On 17 December 1951, Apache sailed to Wonsan, Korea, where she relieved fleet ocean tug USS Yuma (ATF-94) as the area salvage and rescue vessel. Apache also laid buoys in the harbors of Wonsan and Hungnam, Korea, before returning to Sasebo on 4 January 1952.

Apache's next mission began on 18 January 1952, when she took station as a patrol ship off Cho Do and Sok To, Korea. She returned to Yokosuka, Japan, on 19 February 1952 for upkeep but was back in Wonsan harbor on 20 March 1952. She took part in several shore-bombardment missions besides serving as a salvage and rescue vessel. On 12 April 1952, she put in at Sasebo briefly for repairs. During the next four weeks, she made several salvage runs to Cheju Do, Korea, before arriving at Sasebo on 12 May 1952 for repairs.

Apache returned to action at Wonsan on 16 June 1952 and served there until returning to Sasebo on 28 June 1952, ending her Korean War service.

==== Korean War honors and awards ====
Apache received two battle stars for her Korean War service, for:

- Second Korean Winter: 19 December 1951 to 4 January 1952; 19 January to 18 February 1952; 20 March to 13 April 1952; and 26 to 28 April 1952
- Korean Defense Summer-Fall 1952: 9 to 12 May 1952; 16 to 28 June 1952

=== Peacetime service, 1953–1965 ===
Apache departed Japan on 2 July 1952 and headed for Pearl Harbor. But for a tow to Kwajalein and one to Midway Atoll, Apache remained in Hawaiian waters until 4 May 1953, when she departed for Seattle, Washington, where she picked up a tow. She then proceeded to San Diego. She worked along the California coast until mid-July 1953, when she headed for the Western Pacific. She served there through the end of 1954, performing various missions at Guam, Kwajalein, Eniwetok, Bikini Atoll, and the Philippines.

In January 1955, Apache returned to the U.S. West Coast, reaching San Francisco on 14 January 1955. However, she got underway for the Far East on 17 March 1955, reached Yokosuka on 21 May 1955, and began operations with Naval Forces, Far East. Although her home port was changed to San Diego in January 1956, she remained in the Western Pacific through early 1960, serving as a tow ship and occasionally taking part in search and rescue missions.

Early in 1960, Apache returned to San Diego for a six-month overhaul. Then, in December 1960, after several months of service at San Diego, she headed back toward the Western Pacific. She paused at Pearl Harbor and Guam before reaching Sasebo in February 1961. Shortly thereafter, she shifted to Subic Bay at Luzon in the Philippines, and operated from that base into April 1961, when she departed for Kwajalein and Pearl Harbor. On 11 May 1961, she left Hawaii and proceeded to San Diego. Through the rest of 1961 and early 1962, Apache once again conducted coastal towing operations along the U.S. West Coast.

On 7 May 1962, Apache entered the Campbell Machine Company shipyard at San Diego for overhaul and remained there until 18 July 1962, when she commenced refresher training. In early September 1962, she got underway for the Far East. During her tour there, she served in the Philippines, at Okinawa, at Hong Kong, and in Japan before departing Sasebo on 6 January 1963 and setting a course for Pearl Harbor. She proceeded from there to San Diego and spent the next few months in post-deployment standdown and local operations.

Apache continued her pattern of U.S. West Coast operations and Western Pacific deployments during 1964 and 1965.

=== Vietnam War service ===
Late in 1965, Apache made her first Western Pacific cruise involving Vietnam War service which began with U.S. Seventh Fleet operations on Yankee Station off the Vietnamese coast. In early February 1966, she escorted the destroyer USS Brinkley Bass to Subic Bay following Brinkley Bass's collision with guided-missile destroyer USS Waddell in the South China Sea.

After brief service at Da Nang, South Vietnam, Apache proceeded to Hong Kong and Kaohsiung, Taiwan, for rest and recreation. She next carried out one more tow from Subic Bay to Da Nang before leaving Vietnam on 4 March 1966 and heading home. The tug stopped en route at Pearl Harbor before reaching San Diego on 1 April 1966.

==== Vietnam War honors and awards ====
Apache received one campaign star for her Vietnam War service, for:

- Vietnamese Counteroffensive: 4 January to 6 February 1966 and 3 to 5 March 1966

She also received a Navy Unit Commendation and a Meritorious Unit Commendation for her service in the Vietnam War.

=== Support to bathyscaphe Trieste II and other duties, 1966–1974 ===
Apache operated along the California coast through the rest of 1966 and the first eight months of 1967. In September 1967, she was reassigned to Submarine Flotilla 1 to support the operations of the bathyscaphe Trieste II. Apache's new role involved towing the bathyscaphe whenever required.

On 23 October 1967, Apache began a series of tests and trials off San Clemente Island, California, in conjunction with Trieste II. Apache devoted January and February 1968 to providing services for Fleet Training Group, San Diego, but in early March 1968 she resumed her duties with Trieste II.

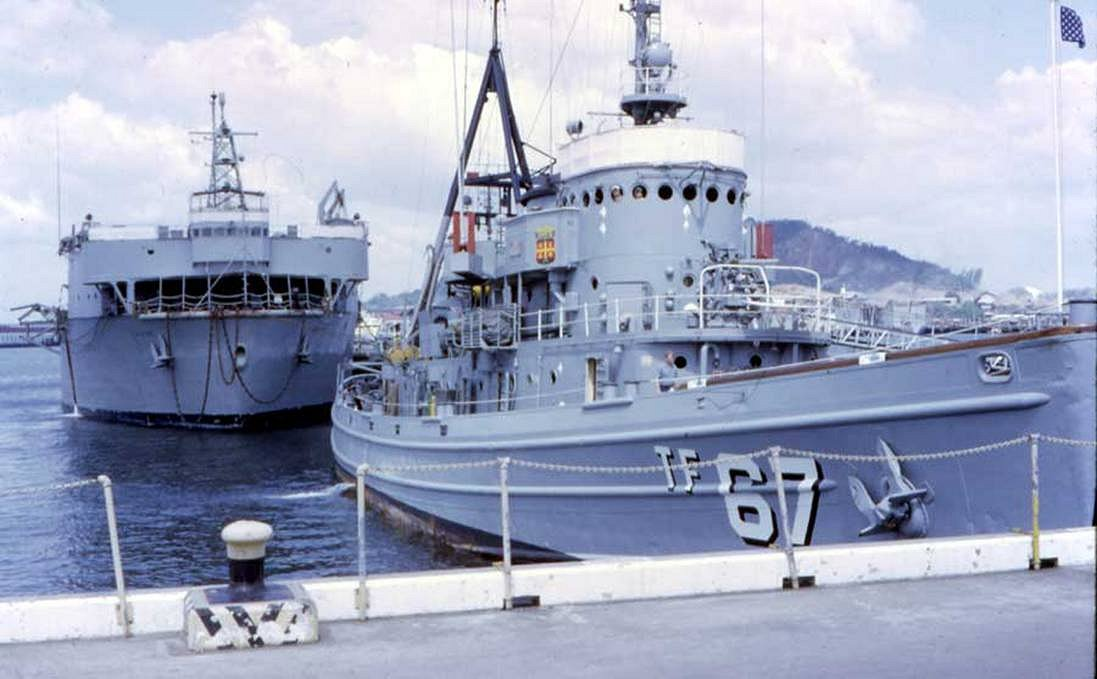
Apache moored ahead of auxiliary repair dock USS White Sands (ARD-20), carrying the bathyscaphe Trieste II, at the Panama Canal Zone ca. 28 February 1969. Apache was towing White Sands to the Atlantic to employ Trieste II in a search for the sunken nuclear submarine USS Scorpion (SSN-589) off the Azores.

On 3 February 1969, Apache got underway from San Diego towing the auxiliary repair dock USS White Sands (ARD-20), which was carrying Trieste II, bound for the Atlantic to employ Trieste II in investigating the 1968 loss of the nuclear submarine USS Scorpion (SSN-589). They reached the Azores on 21 May 1969, where they were joined by the high-speed transport USS Ruchamkin (APD-89), which had been assigned to support them. From 2 June 1969 until 2 August 1969, Apache, White Sands, and Ruchamkin maintained station near Trieste II while the bathyscaphe investigated the remains of Scorpion.

On 7 August 1969, Apache took White Sands, again carrying Trieste II, under tow and, parting company with Ruchamkin, began the long voyage back to San Diego, which they reached on 7 October 1969. Upon her return, Apache began preparations for an extensive overhaul, and she entered the yards at San Diego on 15 December 1969.

After this work was completed in mid-April 1970, Apache held refresher training until late June 1970 and then carried out local operations through 25 September 1970, when she got underway for Panama to escort the submarine USS Dolphin (AGSS-55) back to San Diego. In January 1971, Apache resumed operations with Trieste II.

Apache left San Diego on 5 October 1971 for a series of special operations in the Pearl Harbor area which continued until early May 1972. On 23 May 1972, Apache arrived back at San Diego.

Apache Tuesday 13 December 1972 The Apache celebrated its 30 Birthday. There was a party at the EL Cortez Hotel in San Diego, CA.

Apache got underway once again in June 1972 and alternated salvage operations with towing services for Trieste II. She continued this routine through March 1973 when she began a repair period at San Diego. Several material casualties prolonged the work, and Apache did not leave the shipyard until 21 May 1973, when she sailed with Trieste II for waters off the coast of San Francisco to take part in Operation Teleprobe. However, bad weather postponed the operation, and Apache sustained further damage which forced her to return to San Diego on 23 June 1973 for three weeks of repair work.

Apache arrived in San Francisco on 18 July 1973 and, on 20 July 1973, got underway for Hawaiian waters to resume Operation Teleprobe. The operation was successfully completed on 30 July 1973, and Apache arrived back in San Diego on 8 August 1973 for more local operations.

Apache made her last tow as an active U.S. Navy ship on 31 January 1974, when she delivered the frigate USS Sterett (DLG-31) to Long Beach, California.

== Decommissioning and Sale to the Republic of China ==
On 27 February 1974, Apache was decommissioned from the US Navy. Her name was stricken from the Naval Vessel Register on 30 March 1974. Apache was sold under the Security Assistance Program to the Republic of China on 1 June 1974. Renamed ROCS Ta Wan (ATF-551), she entered service with the Republic of China Navy.
