= Pacific Bridge Company =

Former American engineering and construction company

Coordinates: 37.77752°N 122.25436°W

- Industry: Engineering; Construction
- Founded: 1869; 157 years ago
- Founder: William Henry Gorrill
- Headquarters: Portland, Oregon and Alameda, California
- Key people: William Henry Gorrill; Gorill Swigert; Charles F. Swigert; William Swigert; H. C. Campbell; Philip Hart
- Products: Bridges, ships and barges
- Services: Iron and Steel Construction

Pacific Bridge Company was a large engineering and construction company. During World War II, Pacific Bridge Company of Alameda, California was selected to build US Navy Auxiliary Repair Docks (ARD) a type of Auxiliary floating drydock and Type B ship barges. The company was instrumental during the salvage of the Pacific Fleet in Pearl Harbor.

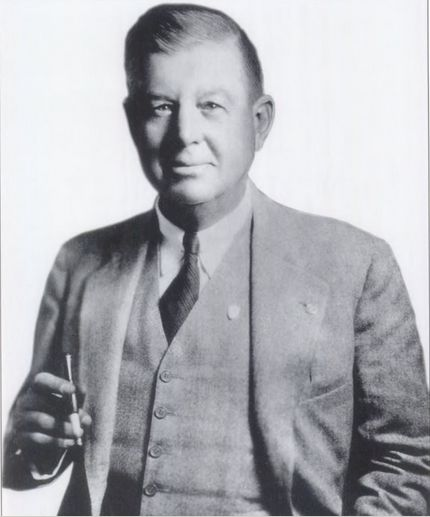
Charles F. Swigert 1913, President of The Pacific Bridge Company for over 40 years

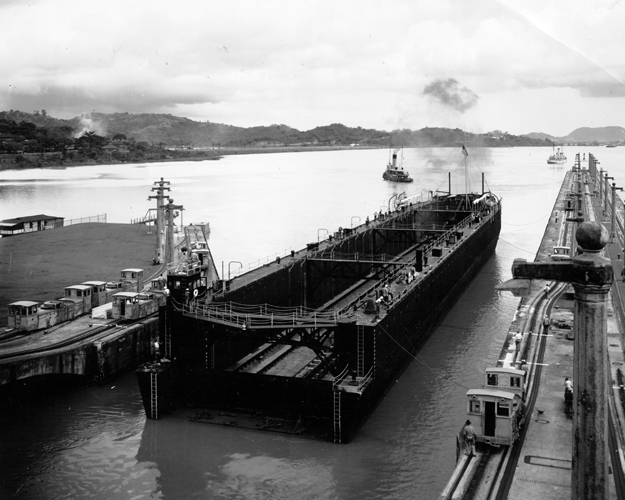
Pacific Bridge Company's USS ARD-1 under tow by USS Bridge 28 October 1934.

== History ==
The Pacific Bridge Company was founded by William Henry Gorrill in 1869. In 1942 The Pacific Bridge Company was chosen to build ships, because of their reputation and skills, particularly welding. Since the coastal shipyards were busy building large vessels for the war effort, such as aircraft carriers, battleships, cruisers and destroyers, there was no alternative but to use other builders, like Bridge builders for the production of small and medium ships. Pacific Bridge Company built the first nine N3-S-A1, Type N3 ship cargo ship sent to Britain in 1943. The type N3 ships were a Maritime Commission small coastal cargo ship designed to meet urgent World War II shipping needs. Two of the N3 ships were completed and ready in a record-breaking 22 days, A crew of 480 men worked on the ship. The SS Samuel Very was one of these ships. Two N3 ships were built at the same time in the two drydocks at the Alameda Shipyard. The Alameda Shipyard had two traveling cranes to move parts.

Henry J. Kaiser's had the Pacific Bridge Company join as one of Kaiser's "Group of Six" construction companies that help build the Hoover Dam, due to Pacific Bridge's expertise. Pacific Bridge also brought its capital into the large project The shipbuilding yard was on the Oakland Alameda estuary. Some residential homes near Clement Avenue and Chestnut Street were purchased and taken down or moved to be part of the Emergency Shipbuilding Program. The Pacific Bridge Company was a contractor to the US Navy to build the ships. The shipyard was to the West of the General Engineering & Dry Dock Company. The land for the shipyard was purchased by the Navy from 24 March to 7 July 1942. The Pacific Bridge Company Oakland Alameda yard discontinued shipbuilding after World War 2, continued manufacturing until 1969. In 1969 the yard was sold for redevelopment and today is the Alameda Marina. The Alameda Marina also has a commercial shipyard, ship maintenance facilities, industrial space, storage, and office buildings. Part of the shipyard became the Naval and Marine Corps Reserve Center in 1949. The Site had several training buildings that provided training on ship systems. On January 21, 2016 demolition started of the Pacific Bridge Company workshop building on Clement Ave. The land will be used for a new condominium complex.

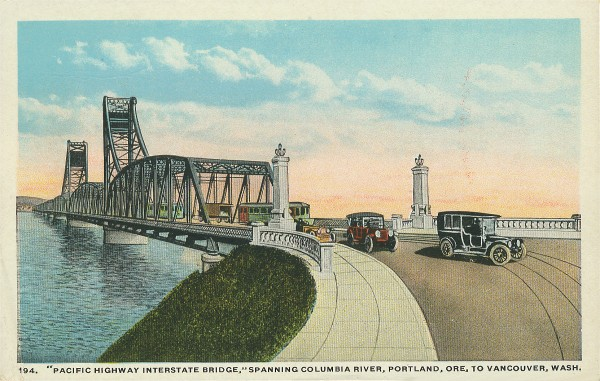
Portland Interstate Bridge Postcard showing streetcar tracks, period autos, built by the Pacific Bridge Company

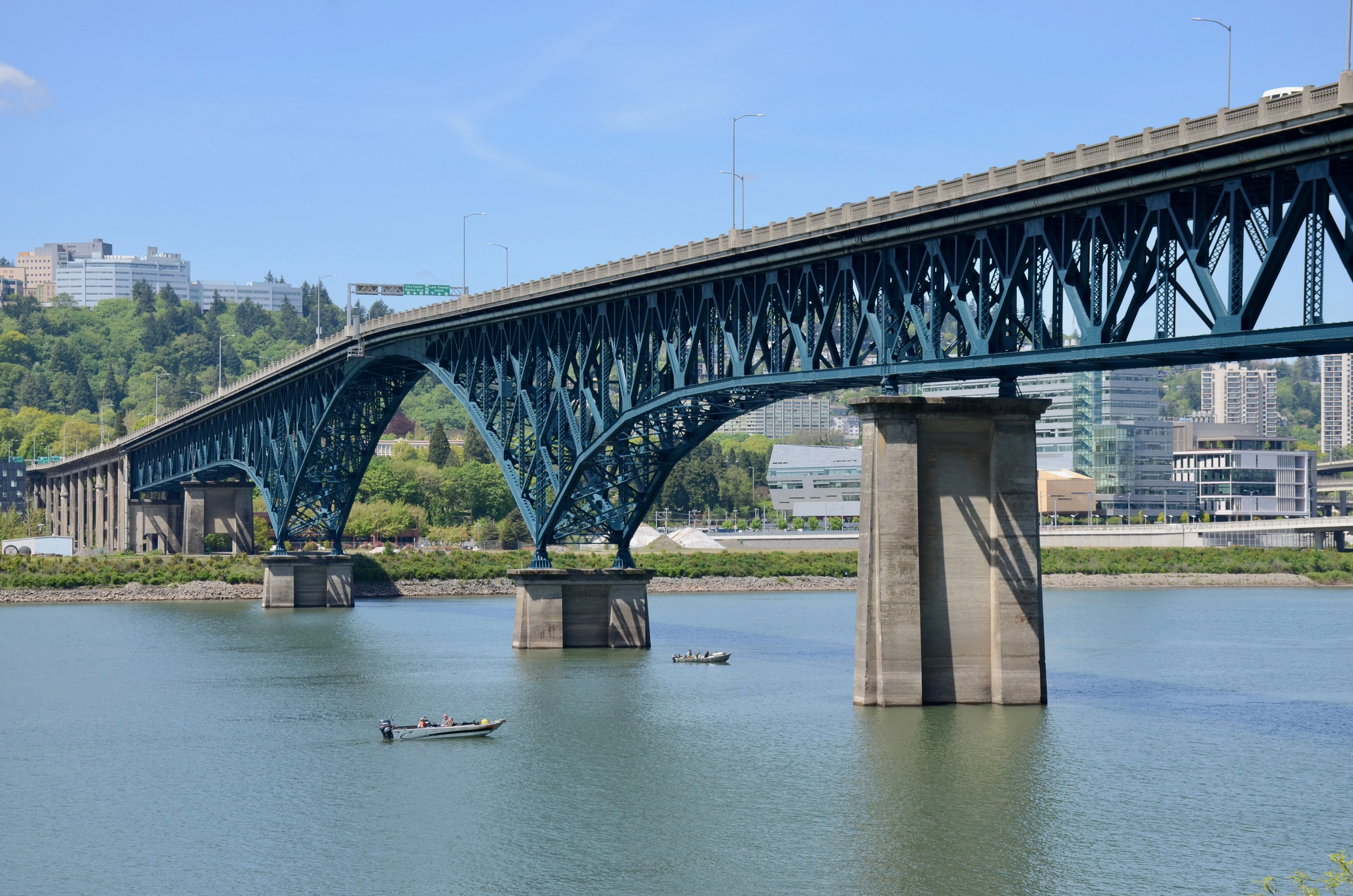
Pacific Bridge was among the contractors who worked on building the Ross Island Bridge, in Portland

Before ship building, Pacific Bridge Company built bridges in both the San Francisco Bay Area and Portland, Oregon. Pacific Bridge Company built 10 bridges over the Willamette River near Portland. To provide stone for project Pacific Bridge Company purchased The McBain Stone Quarry from the estate of James McBain, in Klickitat County, Washington near the Klickitat River in 1922.

== William Henry Gorrill ==
In 1869 William Henry Gorrill founded the Pacific Bridge Company. Pacific Bridge Company was incorporated on March 29, 1872. W. H. Gorrill was President; C. F. Lucas was vice-president and C. H. Gorrill was Secretary and Treasurer. William Henry Gorrill was born in 1841. William Henry Gorrill was an Ohio attorney, who was told to go west for his health, due to his tuberculosis and turned from law to building bridges. William came to California in 1870. William Henry Gorrill's wife was Katharine B Gorrill, they had one daughter, Marion H Gorrill and a son William H. Gorrill born in Oakland in 1872. William Henry Gorrill died in 1874. His son William H. became an attorney in Berkeley and for a short time professor at the University of California, Berkeley. William H. died in Berkeley on 20 Dec. 1961.

== Swigert family ==
Charles F. Swigert and H. C. Campbell purchased Pacific Bridge Company in the 1890s from William Henry Gorrill. Charles F. Swigert had been working at Pacific Bridge since 1881. Charles F. Swigert became and was President of The Pacific Bridge Company for over 40 years. H. C. Campbell became the Sec. In 1887 Charles F. Swigert and Mr. Campbell built the City and Suburban railway, which they operated until 1905. In 1005 they sold it to the Portland Railway, Light and Power Company. At the time of the sale it had eighty miles of single track. Charles F. Swigert also helped build the Lyle and Goldendale Railroad, later sold to the Northern Pacific Railway. Charles F. Swigert turned the company over to his son Gorill Swigert. Gorill Swigert turned the company over to his son William Swigert. Charles F. Swigert and his wife Rena Bliss Goodnough Swigert had three children: Charles F. Swigert, Jr., was vice president and manager of the Electric Steel Foundry Company; Ernest G., sales manager for Electric Steel Foundry and is married and has two children: Nannie and Ernest G., Jr.; and W. G., a director of the Pacific Bridge Company, and is married and has three children: Phyllis, W. G., Jr., and Juliette. H. C. Campbell built large bridges on the East coast before coming out west. H. C. Campbell was part of The Willamette Iron Bridge Company which failed to build the Willamette Bridge, but became part of the Pacific Bridge Company which built the Willamette Bridge.

Philip Hart was President of The Pacific Bridge Company in the 1930s-1940s and was president at the building of the Tacoma Narrows Bridge completed in 1940. Was on United Airlines Flight 6, a DC-3, that crashed landed in water a mile off the coast of Point Reyes, CA while flying from Seattle to San Francisco on November 28, 1938. The DC-3 was in a storm and ran out of fuel. There were five fatalities: the first officer, stewardess, and three passengers including Philip Hart.

== Bridges and piers built ==
A few of the many built:

- Morrison Bridges
- Burnside Bridge 1926
- Interstate Bridge 1916-1958
- Ross Island Bridge 1926 (one of several contributing contractors, but not the main contractor)
- Shepperd's Dell Bridge 1914
- Multnomah Creek Bridge 1920
- Latourell Creek Bridge 1914
- Felton Covered Bridge 1892
- California Powder Works Bridge 1872
- Aliso Road Covered Bridge, Boyle Heights, 1873
- St. Johns Bridge
- Tacoma Narrows Bridge 1940 that failed, (note design team was headed by Clark Eldridge, a bridge engineer with the Washington State Department of Highways, not Pacific Bridge)
- Willamette River Bridge, original 1888, replaced by new Oregon City Bridge
- Bridal Veil Falls Bridge
- Farm Island Bridge in 1875 in Alameda.
- Rockport Suspension Bridge, 1876
- Old Oregon City Suspension Bridge, 1888
- Longview Bridge 1928 now called the Lewis and Clark Bridge.
- Fort Flagler batteries, 1897
- Santa Cruz Railroad Bridges, 1874
- Snake River Bridge at Burbank burns, 1921
- Bridges for the Monterey Felton & Pescadero Railroad, part of South Pacific Coast Railroad, 1885
- New Allen Street Bridge, 1923, replace the Allen Street Bridge disaster
- Burnside Bridge
- Ten metal truss bridges were shipped to Hawaii in In 1884
- Red Bank Creek Bridge
- Part of the Hoover Dam, bridge building and underwater foundations
- Part of the Golden Gate Bridge project, awarded contract for San Francisco Tower Pier and Fender, Marin Tower Pier for $2,935,000.

== Pearl Harbor salvage ==
Pacific Bridge Company was awarded a contract from the Navy to salvage the sunken ships at Pearl Harbor after the attack on Pearl Harbor. Pacific Bridge divers worked many hours to save ships and lives. The salvage and raising of the USS Oklahoma (BB-37), USS Utah (BB-31) and USS West Virginia (BB-48) was given to Pacific Bridge.

== Ships built from 1942 to 1944 ==
=== N3-S-A1 cargo ships ===
- SS Charles H. Salter, wrecked and lost off Iceland 1946
- SS Cyrus Sears, sold: kidby 1951, Borgfred 1951, Lise 1954, Aura 1955, Fernando 1960, Fata Morgana 1962, Giannis 1963), sank 1964
- SS Benjamin Sherburn, sold Winga 1949, Rilda 1952, Raed 1968, scrapped 1972
- SS Samuel V. Shreve, sold Jura 1949, Barcelona 1957, foundered 1963
- SS Reuben Snow, sold Beechland 1949, Teresa Cosulich 1951, Agia Varvara 1963, exploded and sank 1968
- SS Caleb Sprague, torpedoed and sunk by German motor torpedo boats on January 31, 1944, off Beachy Head
- SS Benjamin Tay, sold Benue 1951, Anglo 1952, Lindvang 1965, Danaos 1969, Veta 1974, Agios Favourios III 1975, scrapped 1980
- SS Charles Treadwell, sold Dundrum Bay 1950, Esito 1952, Sandra 1953, West Indies 1953, Esito 1954, wrecked 1964
- SS Samuel Very, sold Angusloch 1951, Changsung 1953, scrapped 1985

=== Type B ship barges ===
Freight Barges YFN were not self-propelled, but towed to place. A YFN could carry a load of 550 long tons. YFN were used near shore and had a steel hull. They worked in harbors, rivers and other protected waters. They were 110 feet long, with a 32-foot beam and a maximum draft of 8 feet. Pacific Bridge built 27 YFN Freight Barges in 1943. Pacific Bridge also built 90 of the 138-ton barges, these smaller barges were sometimes called lighters, they were 110-foot-long, some were covered workshops, due to their simple and well-built construction some are still in service today.

- YFN 576 to YFN 603.

=== Medium Auxiliary Repair Docks (ARDM) ===
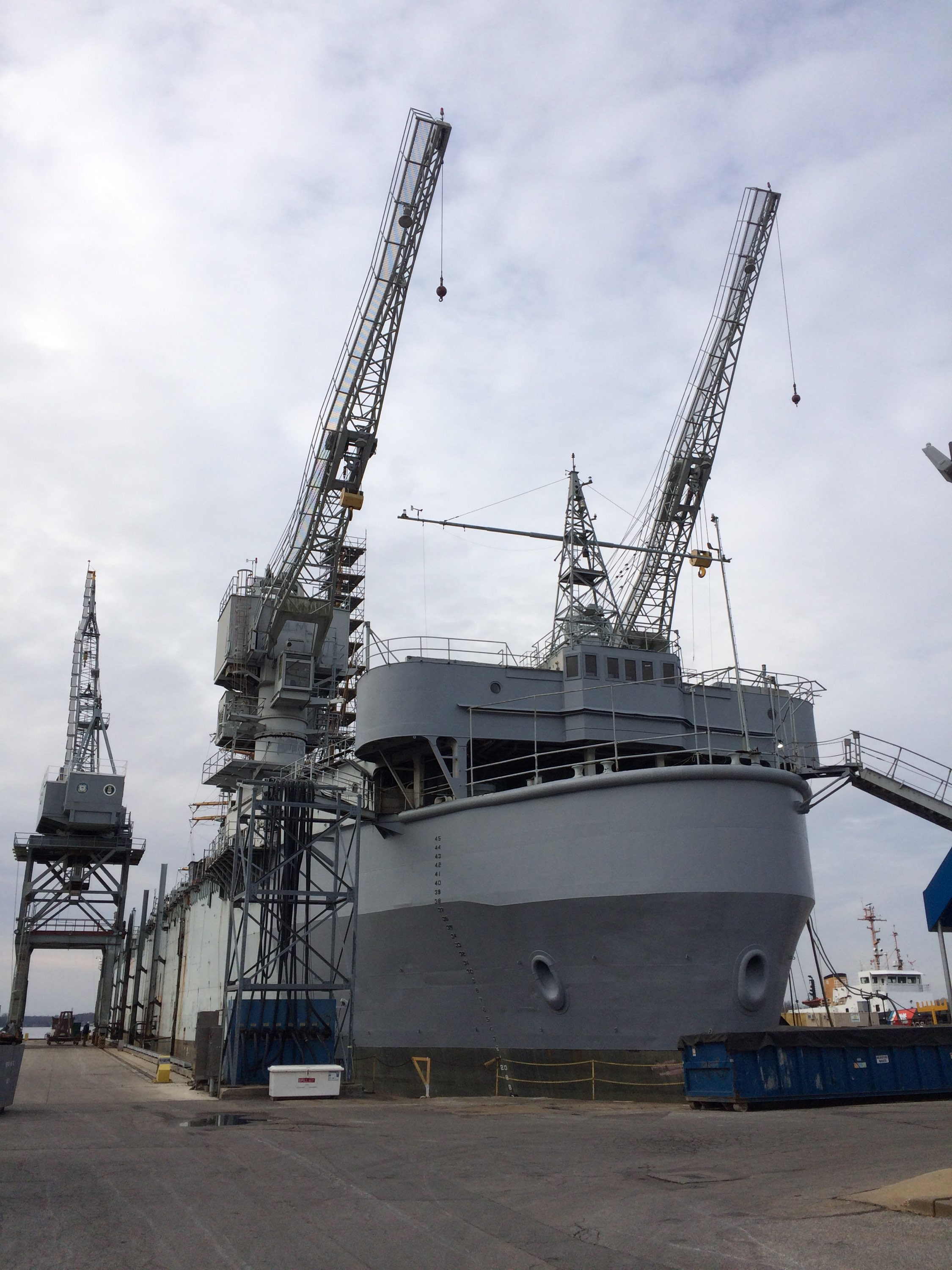
USS Oak Ridge (ARDM-1)

Auxiliary repair dock Mobile (ARDM) are 5,200 tons and are 489 feet long. ARD had a ship form hull and lifting capacity of 3,500 tons. ARDM were used to repair destroyers, submarines, and small auxiliaries. ARDM has a crew of 130 to 160 men.

- USS Oak Ridge (ARDM-1) Now US Coast Guard
- USS Almagordo (ARDM-2) Now in Ecuador
- USS Endurance (ARDM-3) Now in South America

=== Auxiliary Repair Docks (ARD) ===
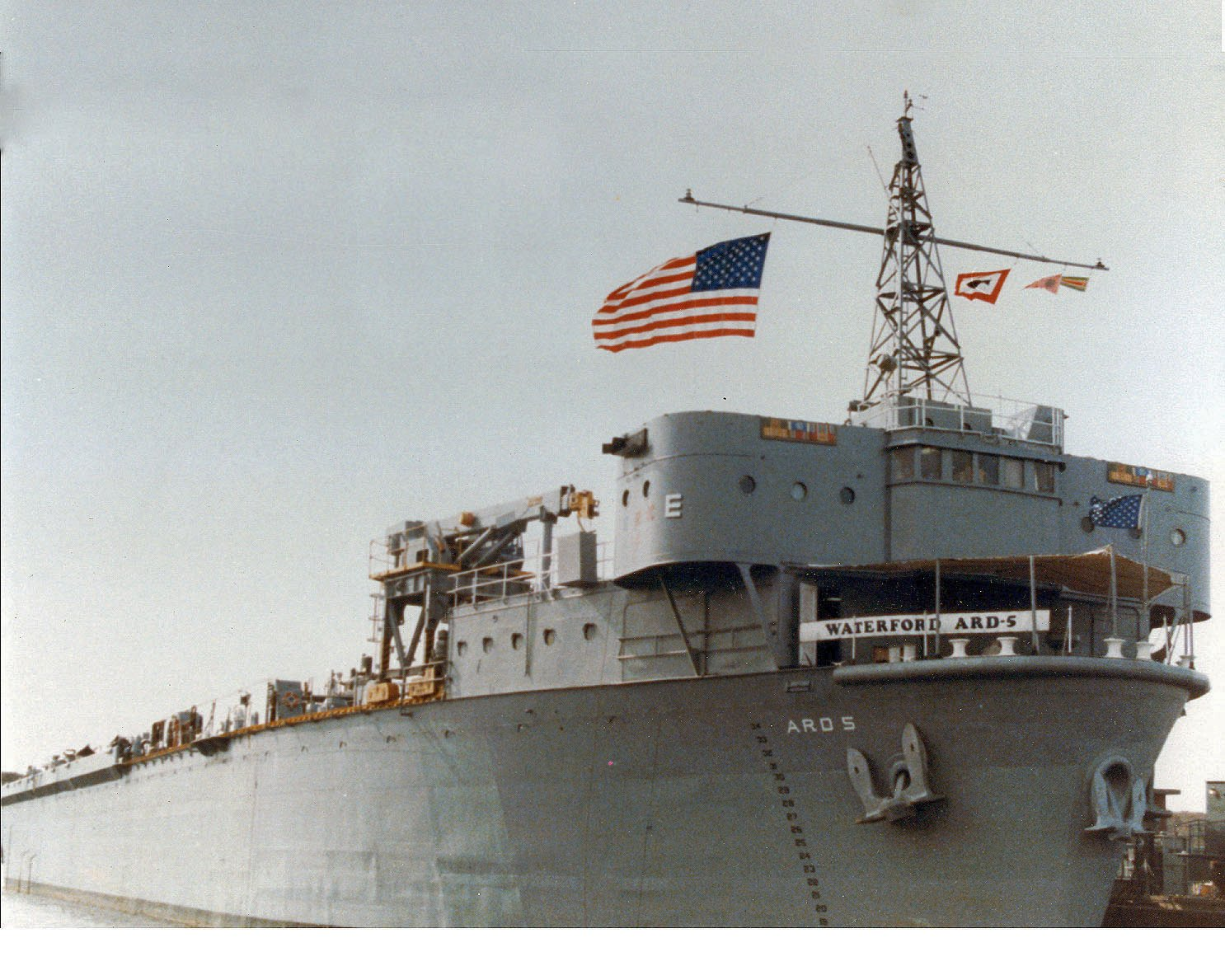
Pacific Bridge's USS Waterford (ARD-5)

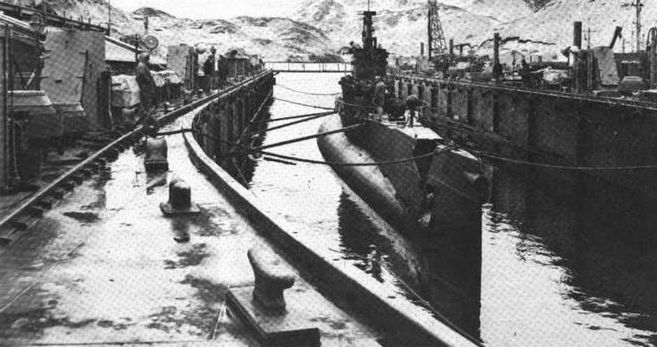
Pacific Bridge's ARD-6 submerged at Dutch Harbor Alaska with Sub USS S-46 for repair 1944

Built by Pacific Bridge in Alameda CA and are 483 feet long, beam of 71 Feet, and draft of 5 Feet. Ship displacement 4,800 tons. Crew complement 6 Officers and 125 Enlisted. Armament of two single Oerlikon 20 mm cannon. ARD had a crew of 100 to 160 men. ARD have a bow and are sea worthy. They are self-sustaining with rudders to help in tow moving and have two cranes with a 5-ton capacity. Normal also had stowage barge for extra space. Used to repair destroyers and submarines. Class 2 could repair Landing Ship, Tank (LST). The stern of ship is open to have the ship in need of repair enter.

- USS ARD-1 (displacement of 2200 tons) (Built in 1933) (only one in class)
- USS ARD-2 sold in 1963
- USS ARD-3 sold 1999
- USS ARD-4 sold 1961
  - ARD-2-class 410 feet long, 49 feet, 4 inches wide, ARD-5 to 11:
- USS Waterford (ARD-5)
- USS ARD-6 sold 1961
- USS West Milton (ARD-7) Scrapped in 1992
- USS ARD-8 sold 1961
- USS ARD-9 sold 1977
- USS ARD-10 sold, scrapped in 2014
- USS ARD-11 sold 1977
  - ARD-2-class wide: 410 feet long, 49 feet, 4 inches 59 feet, 3 inches wide, ARD 12 to 32:
- USS ARD-12 sold 1987
- USS ARD-13 sold 1977
- USS ARD-14 sold 1980
- USS ARD-15 sold 1971
- USS ARD-16 by Pacific Bridge, sold moved to Mobile AL
- USS ARD-17 sold 1971
- USS Endurance ARD-18 ARDM 3, laid up at Charleston Naval Shipyard
- USS Oak Ridge ARD-19 ARDM 1, to United States Coast Guard in 2002
- USS White Sands ARD-20 by Pacific Bridge Co., (changed to AGDS-1), sold 1974
- USS ARD-21 reserve
- USS Windsor (ARD-22) sold 1976
- USS ARD-23 sold 1992
- USS ARD-24 sold 1982
- USS ARD-25 sold 1973
- USS Alamogordo ARD-26 sold 2000
- USS ARD-27 Scrapped in 1974
- USS ARD-28 sold renamed Capitan Rodriguez Zamora
- USS Arco ARD-29 sold to Iran 1971
- USS San Onfre (ARD-30) by Pacific Bridge Co.
- USS ARD-31 To US Air Force in 1974
- USS ARD-32 sold 1960
- USS ARD-33 (By Dravo Corp.) renamed AFDL 47 Reliance

== See also ==
- California during World War II
- Maritime history of California
- Wooden boats of World War 2
