= Charles F. Swigert =

American businessperson

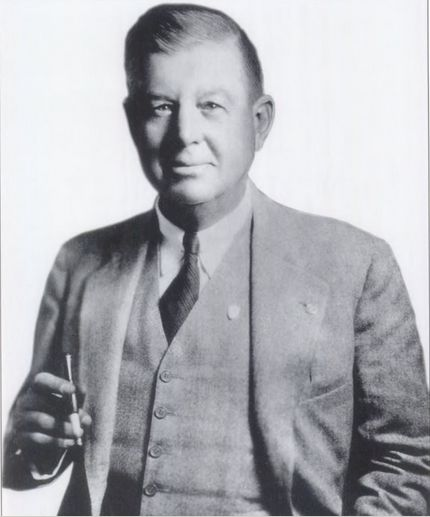
- Born: December 1, 1863; Bowling Green, Ohio
- Died: June 23, 1935 (aged 71); San Francisco, California
- Resting place: River View Cemetery
- Occupation: Businessperson
- Known for: President of Pacific Bridge Company
- Spouse: Rena Bliss Goodnough
- Children: 3

Charles F. Swigert was an American businessperson and president of the Pacific Bridge Company. The Oregon Encyclopedia describes him as a "street railway magnate". Willamette Week described Swigert as "a prominent turn-of-the-century Portland businessman who, among other things, headed the Port of Portland, served on the Chamber of Commerce, built the Morrison Bridge and, with his son Ernest, laid the groundwork for two phenomenally successful Oregon manufacturing companies, ESCO and Hyster".

== Early life ==
Charles F. Swigert was born on 1 December 1863.

== Family ==
Swigert and Rena Bliss Goodnough Swigert (1865–1958) were married and had three children. Charles F. Swigert, Jr., was vice president and manager of the Electric Steel Foundry Company; Ernest G. Swigert, sales manager for Electric Steel Foundry; and W. G., a director of the Pacific Bridge Company.
