= USS White Sands =

American floating dry dock

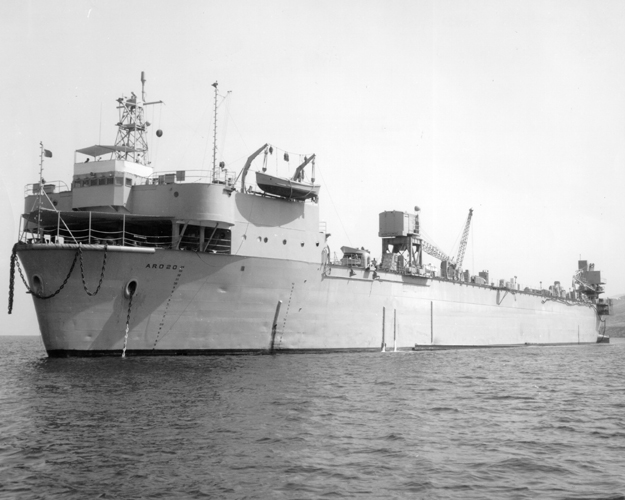
- ARD 20

History

United States
- Name: USS ARD-20 (until 1966); USS ARD(BS)-20 (1966–1968); USS White Sands (from 1968)
- Namesake: The White Sands region of New Mexico
- Builder: Pacific Bridge Company, Alameda, California
- Laid down: 20 December 1943
- Launched: early 1944
- In service: 31 March 1944
- Out of service: 7 October 1947
- In service: 14 September 1966
- Out of service: late summer 1974
- Renamed: From ARD-20 to ARD(BS)-20 14 September 1966; White Sands 9 March 1968
- Reclassified: From auxiliary repair dock (ARD-20) to bathyscaphe support auxiliary repair dock (ARD(BS)-20) 14 September 1966; Auxiliary repair dock (ARD-20) 9 March 1968; auxiliary deep submergence support ship (AGDS-1) 1 August 1973
- Stricken: September 1974
- Fate: Struck from US Navy Register 1974
- Status: In Use as Floating Drydock, Seattle, WA

General characteristics
- Class & type: ARD-12-class auxiliary repair dock
- Displacement: 5,200 long tons (5,283 t)
- Length: 291 ft 8 in (88.90 m)
- Beam: 81 ft (25 m)
- Draft: 6 ft (1.8 m); 32 ft 10 in (10.01 m) submerged
- Propulsion: None
- Complement: 112

USS White Sands (ARD-20), ex-USS ARD-20, ex-USS ARD(BS)-20, later AGDS-1, was a United States Navy auxiliary repair dock in service from 1944 to 1947 and from 1966 to 1974 and an Auxiliary floating drydock.

== Construction and commissioning ==
ARD-20 was laid down on 20 December 1943 by the Pacific Bridge Company at Alameda, California, and was launched early in 1944. She was placed in service on 31 March 1944 with Lieutenant Commander Gutav Jones, USNR, as officer-in-charge.

== First period in service, 1944–1947 ==
After training at the Drydock Training Center at Tiburon, California, ARD-20 departed San Francisco Bay on 11 June 1944 under tow by the merchant ship SS Stratford Point. She stopped briefly at Espiritu Santo in the New Hebrides Islands before arriving at her assigned base, Seeadler Harbor, at Manus Island in the Admiralty Islands, on 12 August 1944. As a unit of the United States Seventh Fleet's Service Squadron 3, ARD-20 repaired battle-damaged ships at Manus for the next eight months.

On 16 April 1945, the tug USS ATA-170 towed ARD-20 out of Seeadler Harbor and set a course for Morotai Island, located just north of Halmahera in the northern Molucca Islands. The two vessels arrived at Morotai on 29 April 1945. ARD-20 conducted repairs at Morotai until 24 July 1945, when she was towed to the repair base at Manicani Island, located near Samar in the Philippine Islands, where she spent 19 months.

ARD-20 departed Manicani on 25 February 1947, under tow by the merchant ship SS Robert Eden, and arrived in Apra Harbor, Guam, on 9 March 1947. Later in 1946, the merchant ship SS Robert Hartley towed her by way of Pearl Harbor, Territory of Hawaii, to San Pedro, California, where the two vessels arrived on 11 September 1947.

ARD-20 was placed out of service on 7 October 1947 and berthed with the San Pedro Group, Pacific Reserve Fleet.

== Second period in service, 1966–1974 ==
Eighteen years later, in October 1965, ARD-20 was moved to the Long Beach Naval Shipyard at Terminal Island, California, where work began on her modernization and conversion into a bathyscaphe support ship. Reclassified as a bathyscaphe support auxiliary repair dock (ARD(BS)), she was placed in service on 14 September 1966 as USS ARD(BS)-20 and assigned to the Submarine Force, United States Pacific Fleet, to conduct Chief of Naval Operations-sponsored research projects related to deep submergence vehicles and their operation.

On 9 March 1968, ARD(BS)-20 was named USS White Sands, and her hull designation was shortened back to ARD-20.

From 1968, White Sands conducted tests with the bathyscaphe Trieste II in various open ocean environments. Those tests took place near the Undersea Weapons Center near San Clemente Island off California. The White Sands also participated in the recovery of a KH-9 Hexagon payload lost at sea.

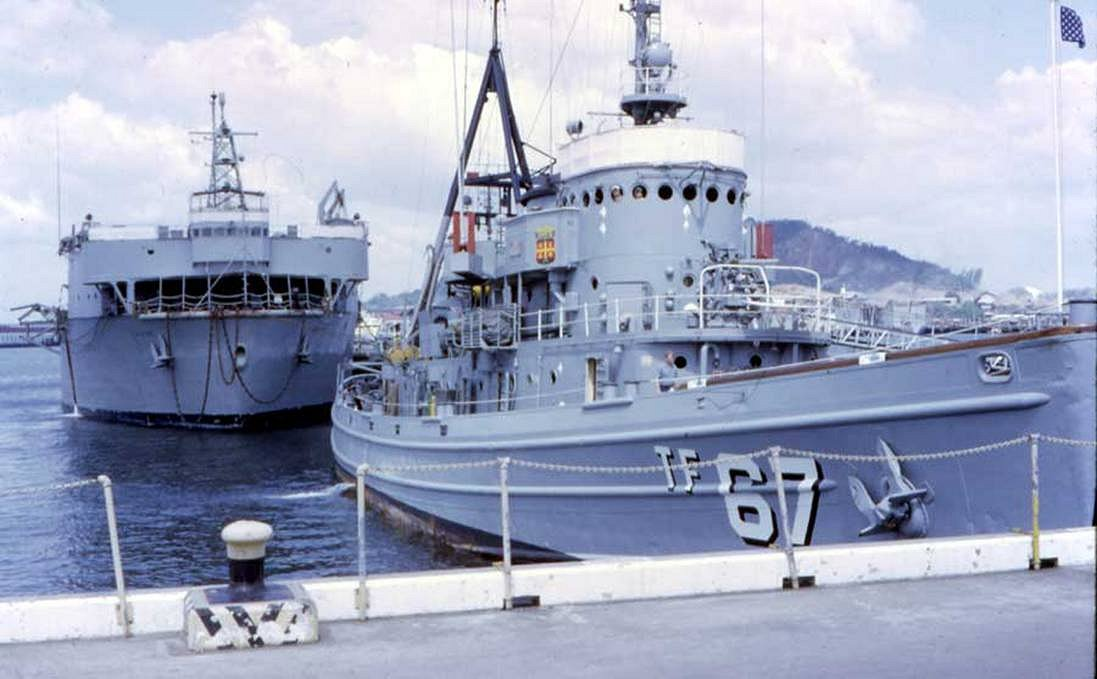
USS White Sands, carrying the bathyscaphe Trieste II, moored behind the fleet ocean tug USS Apache (ATF-67) at the Panama Canal Zone ca. 28 February 1969. Apache was towing White Sands to the Atlantic to search for the sunken nuclear submarine USS Scorpion (SSN-589) off the Azores.

In February 1969, White Sands, carrying Trieste II, departed the United States West Coast, towed by the fleet ocean tug USS Apache (ATF-67) to participate in the search for the nuclear submarine USS Scorpion (SSN-589)—which had been lost in the Atlantic Ocean near the Azores in 1968—employing Trieste II and supported by Apache and the high-speed transport USS Ruchamkin (APD-89). White Sands concluded her part in the Scorpion assignment early in August 1969 and was towed, via the Panama Canal, to San Diego, California, where she arrived on 7 October 1969.

At San Diego, White Sands resumed her research assignment with deep submergence vehicles. On 1 August 1973, she was reclassified an auxiliary deep submergence support ship and redesignated AGDS-1.

== Final disposition ==
Late in the summer of 1974, White Sands was placed out of service. Her name was struck from the Naval Vessel Register in September 1974, and she was to be sold for scrapping. Instead, she was purchased by Seattle-based Marine Power and Equipment to be used in the construction of barges for the US Navy. The company elected to move her into Seattle's Lake Union, where she would then be used as a permanent dry dock in fresh water.

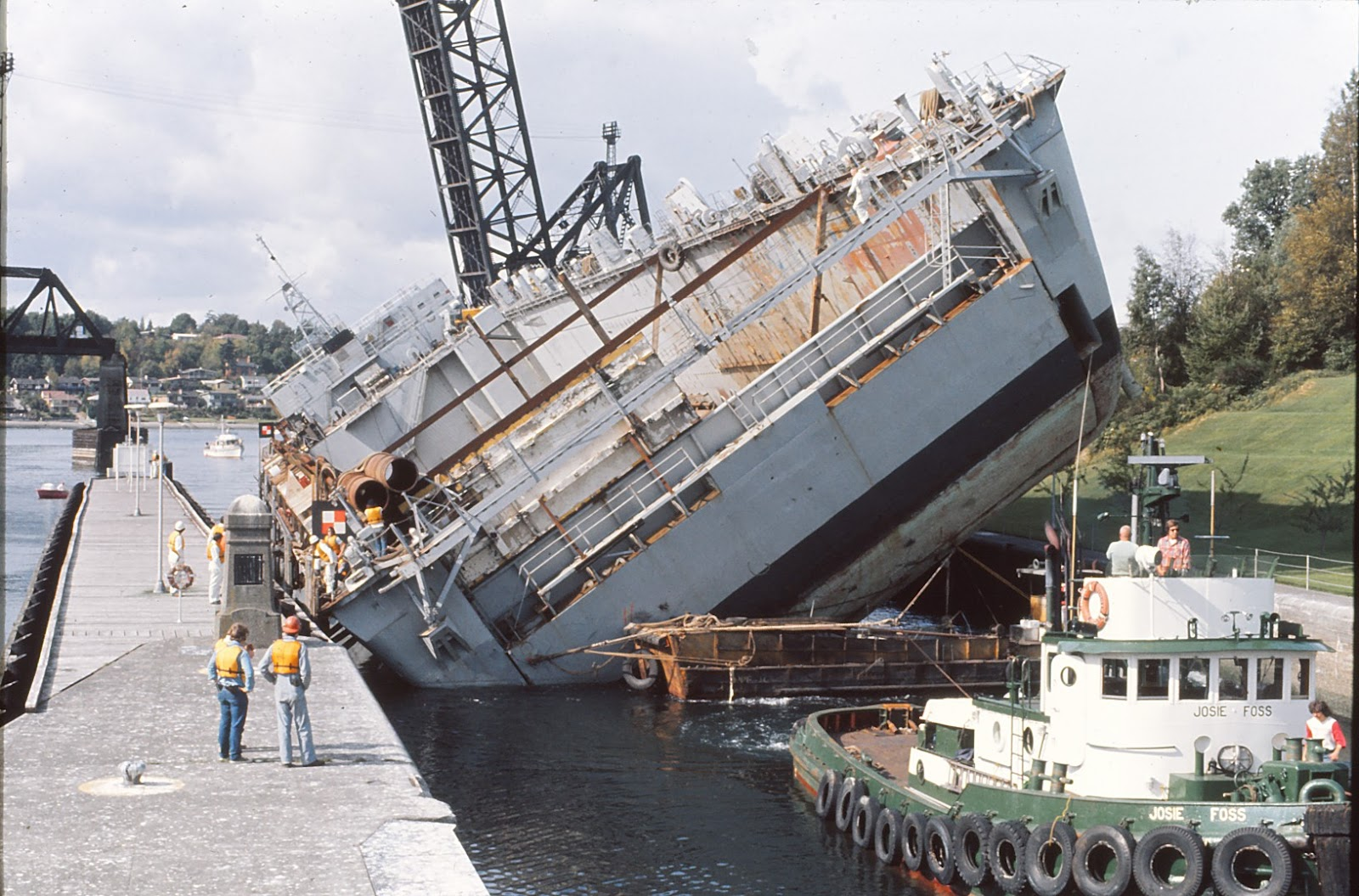
USS White Sands traversing Seattle's Ballard Locks on her side, 4 October 1975.

To reach her permanent home, however, required passing through the 80-foot wide Hiram Chittenden Locks in Ballard - a difficult accomplishment for a vessel with an 81-foot beam. In cooperation with the US Army Corps of Engineers, operators of the locks, a plan was devised to turn the White Sands partially on her side and then send her through. To accomplish this, one side of the ship was ballasted with water and weighted down with 51 concrete blocks and 17 stacks of steel plates, weighing almost 1226 short tons, while the other side - raised 38 degrees in the air - was supported by two air-filled barges cabled to the ship's superstructure.

Adding to the difficulty of this engineering feat, it was determined that the passage could only be attempted at the highest tide. Should the ship be delayed for a few moments, her bottom would no longer clear the side of the locks. Attempting such a transit was incredibly risky: even today, the locks support a substantial amount of commercial traffic. Had the tide subsided before she completed the transit, engineers had already decided there was only one other option: quickly cut her into pieces and scrap her.

A first attempt failed when one of the supporting barges broke free and shot across the canal. The barge was retrieved and reattached, and on the following day, 4 October 1975, the second attempt was a success. She was gently pulled into position in the locks by tugboats, and transited the locks at high tide.

The White Sands remains the largest vessel ever to transit the Ballard Locks, and is still in use as a dry dock at Lake Union Drydock Co. in Seattle, WA. She is visible on maps of Lake Union, in the southeast corner of the lake. She remains largely intact; only the front part of her superstructure has been cut off so she can sit flush with her moorings.
