= USS Arco (ARD-29) =

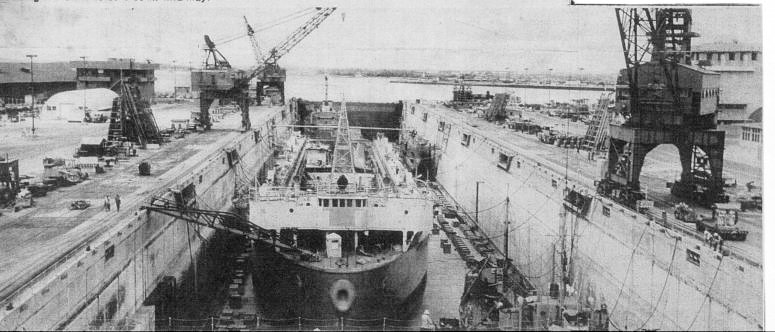
- USS ARD-29 a land drydocked at Naval Shipyard Pearl Harbor in Drydock Number Four for repairs in April 1951.

History

United States
- Name: USS ARD-29
- Builder: Pacific Bridge Company Alameda, California
- Commissioned: 23 June 1945
- Decommissioned: 1 November 1971
- Renamed: Arco (28 March 1967)
- Fate: transferred to Iran, 1 November 1971
- Stricken: 15 September 1976

Iran
- Name: FD-4
- Acquired: 1 November 1971
- Status: ship in active service

General characteristics
- Class & type: ARD-12-class auxiliary repair dock
- Displacement: 5,200 tons (light)
- Length: 492 ft (150 m)
- Beam: 81 ft (25 m)
- Draft: 6 ft (1.8 m)
- Armament: 2 x 20 mm

USS ARD-29 was an auxiliary repair dock that served with the United States Navy during World War II as an Auxiliary floating drydock. In 1967, the ship was renamed Arco, and in the 1970s the vessel was first loaned, and later sold, to Iran.

== Service history ==
ARD-29 was placed in service at San Diego, California on 1 July 1944 and was employed by the Navy at the Naval Repair Base at San Diego during the latter part of 1944 and the beginning of 1945. Early in 1945, the drydock began to receive modifications at the Kaiser Cargo yard at Richmond, California, in preparation for assignment to advanced bases in the Pacific. She was placed in commission on 23 June 1945.

ARD-29 visited Everett, Washington, for about a month before getting underway for the Central Pacific on 22 July. She stopped en route at Kwajalein in the Marshall Islands to change tugs and then continued on to the Marianas on 24 August under tow by USS Wateree. The floating drydock arrived at Guam on 2 September and operated there and later at Okinawa until late in 1946 when she was transferred to Pearl Harbor. ARD-29 provided repair services to Pacific Fleet ships at Pearl Harbor until the beginning of 1959. At that time, she was towed back to Guam where she served out the last 12 years of her Navy career. During this assignment, she was named Arco on 28 March 1967. On 1 November 1971, Arco was loaned to the Imperial Iranian Navy. On 15 September 1976, her name was struck from the Navy list and she was sold to Iran on 1 March 1977.

As of the end of 2007, she was still on the active list of the Iranian Navy as Drydock No. 400.
