= USS ARD-17 =

WW II navy dry dock in California, US

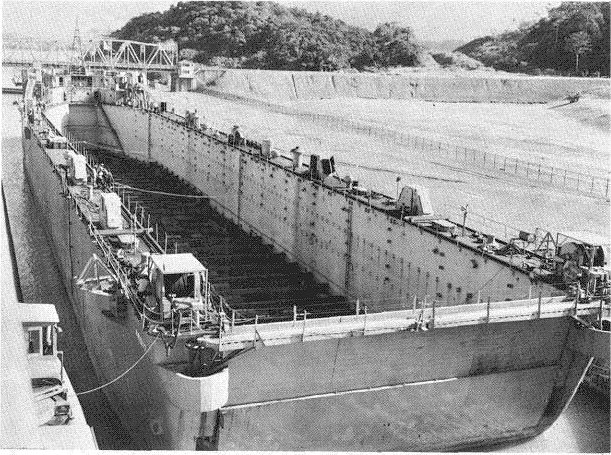
- USS ARD-17 in the Panama Canal on her way to Ecuadorian Navy at Rodman Naval Station Canal Zone.

History

United States
- Name: ARD-17
- Builder: Pacific Bridge Company, Alameda, California
- Stricken: 1 December 1977
- Fate: Sold to Ecuador, 1 December 1977

History

Ecuador
- Name: Amazonas (DF 81)
- Acquired: 1 December 1977

General characteristics
- Class & type: ARD-12-class floating dry dock
- Displacement: 5200 tons
- Length: 492 ft (150 m)
- Beam: 81 ft (25 m)
- Draft: 6 ft (1.8 m)
- Propulsion: None

USS ARD-17 was an ARD-12-class floating dry dock built for the U.S. Navy during World War II as an Auxiliary floating drydock. Like most of the ships of her class, she was not named but known only by her designation.

== History ==
ARD-17 was built at Pacific Bridge Company in Alameda, California and delivered to the Navy in early 1944.

In July and August 1944, ARD-17 served a support role in the liberation of Guam.

In late September 1944, USS Zuni (ATF-95) towed ARD-17 from Guam to Palau. On 30 November 1944 ARD-17 was damaged by a near miss from a Japanese bomber while anchored at Naval Base Kossol Roads, Palau.

In February 1945, ARD-17 and sister ship ARD-16 were at Leyte Gulf servicing ships returning from Iwo Jima and preparing for Okinawa.

After the war, she eventually was returned to the United States, and for a time was laid up as part of the Atlantic Reserve Fleet at Naval Shipyard at Boston, Massachusetts.

On 1 December 1977, ARD-17 was stricken from the Naval Vessel Register, and sold the same day to Ecuador under the Security Assistance Program. Renamed Amazonas (DF-81), her current fate is unknown.
