= USS ARD-10 =

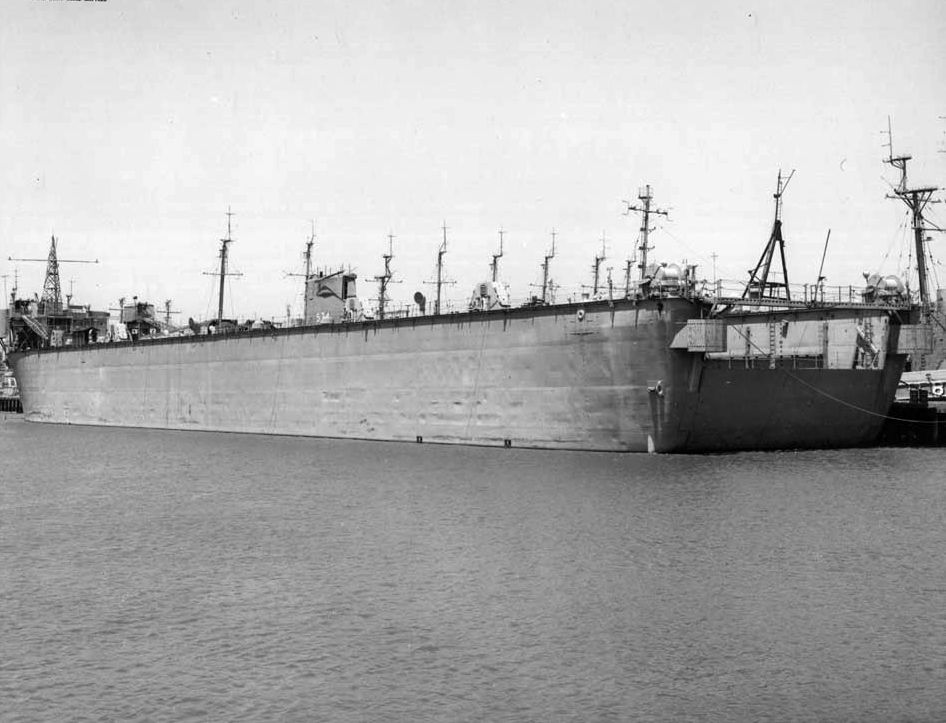
- USS ARD-10 at Mare Island Navy Yard, with a submarine in her dock

History

United States
- Name: USS ARD-10
- Builder: Pacific Bridge Company
- Commissioned: October 1943
- Stricken: July 1972
- Fate: Sold to private interests

General characteristics
- Class & type: ARD-2-class auxiliary repair dock
- Displacement: 4,200 tons (light)
- Length: 482 ft 7 in (147.09 m)
- Beam: 71 ft (22 m)
- Draft: 5 ft (1.5 m)
- Complement: 131
- Armament: 2 x 20 mm

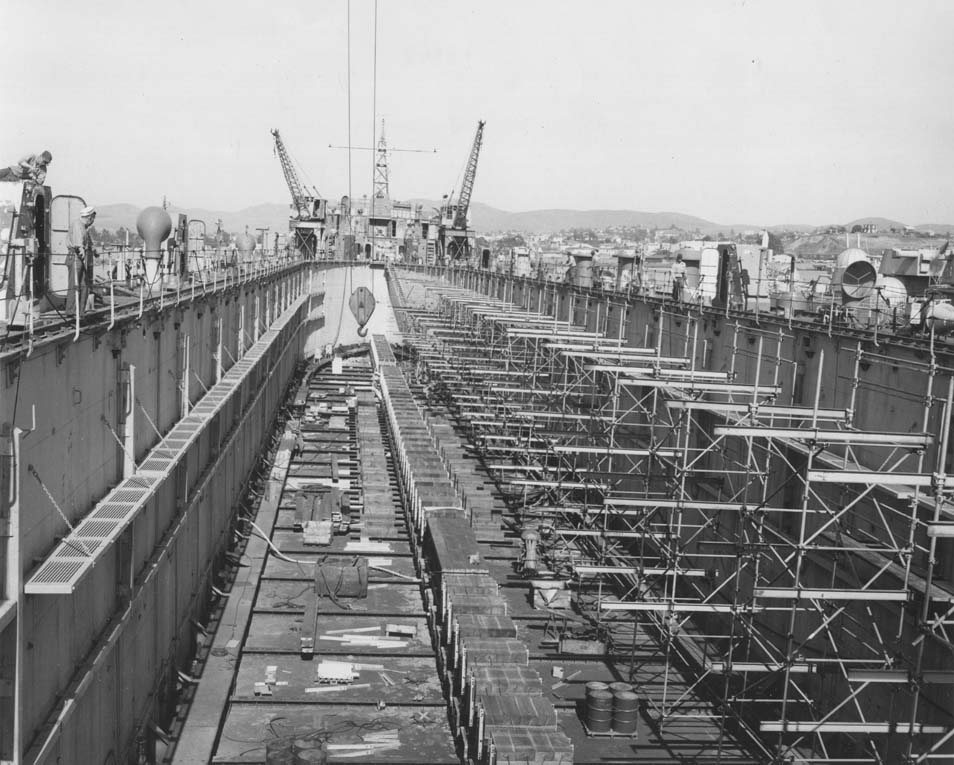
USS ARD-10 receiving a new paint job at Mare Island Naval Shipyard, Vallejo, CA.

USS ARD-10 was an auxiliary repair dock in the service of the United States Navy in World War II as an auxiliary floating drydock, built by Pacific Bridge Company. As was common with other auxiliary repair docks, the ship was only known by her designation and was not otherwise named.

ARD-10 was commissioned in Alameda, California in October 1943. She was towed by Yuma from San Francisco, California on 12 December 1943 first to Sydney, Australia and then on to Melbourne on 1 February 1944. Yuma and ARD-10 finally arrived at Fremantle, Western Australia, on 6 March 1944. There ARD-10 served the submarine base until end of the war.

ARD-10 returned to the United States after in 1946. She was stricken from US Navy service in July 1972 and subsequently sold to Bendershipbuilding Repair Co. of Mexico. As of 6 February 2013 the ship was still operational.

ARD-10 was a member of the ARD-2 class of Auxiliary Repair Drydocks (ARD). The ARD-2 class of drydocks dates to early World War II and were towed to where they were required, generally forward area anchorages. Five of the 7 ARD-2-class drydocks built are still in existence in foreign navies. The 486-foot-long (148 m) ARD could handle World War II-era ships up to destroyer size.
