= USS Alamogordo =

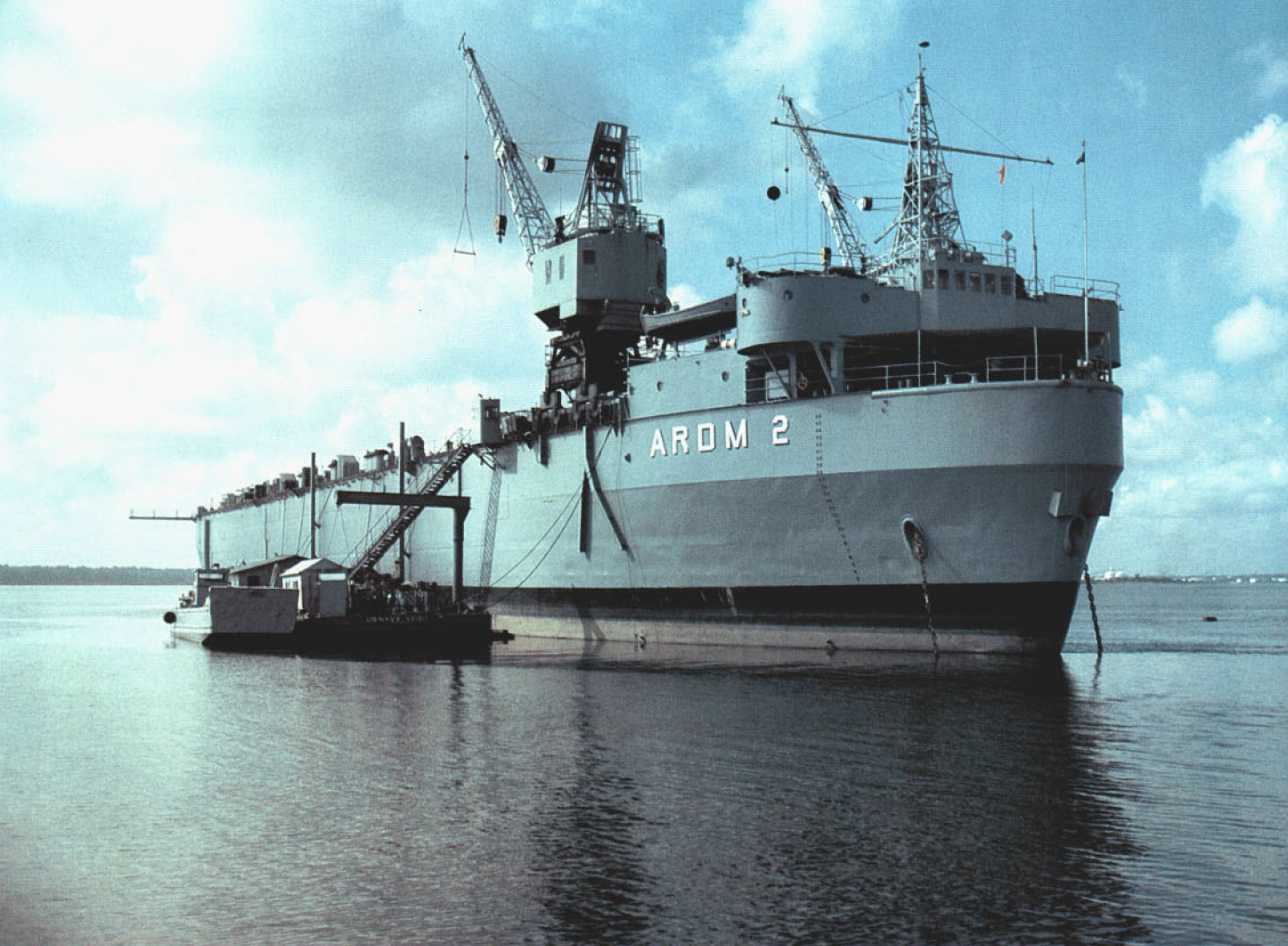
- USS Alamogordo (ARDM-2) at anchor on the Cooper River, Charleston, SC, date unknown.

History

United States
- Name: USS ARD-26
- Builder: Pacific Bridge Company, Alameda, CA
- Commissioned: 5 June 1944
- Decommissioned: October 1962
- Refit: Converted to an Auxiliary Repair Dry Dock, Medium (ARDM) at Bethlehem Steel Corp, Baltimore, MD
- Renamed: Alamogordo (ARDM-2), 22 March 1965
- Namesake: Alamogordo, New Mexico
- In service: 3 August 1965
- Stricken: 23 November 1993
- Fate: Transferred to Ecuador, 18 December 2000

History

Ecuador
- Acquired: 18 December 2000

General characteristics (as built)
- Class & type: ARD-12-class floating dry dock
- Displacement: 5,200 tons
- Length: 491 ft 8 in (149.86 m)
- Beam: 81 ft (24.7 m)
- Draft: 33 ft 3 in (10.13 m)
- Complement: 120
- Armament: 2 × 40 mm AA guns; 2 × 20 mm AA guns

General characteristics (as refit)
- Class & type: ARDM-1-class floating dry dock
- Length: 536 ft 1 in (163.40 m)

Alamogordo (ARDM-2) — a non-self-propelled United States Navy Auxiliary floating drydock completed in 1944 at Oakland, California, by the Pacific Bridge Company as ARD-26 — was commissioned on 15 June 1944. The floating dry dock completed outfitting at Oakland and training at Tiburon, CA, between mid-June and late August. On 3 September, she was taken in tow for the voyage west. En route to the Marianas, the dry dock made layovers of ten and seven days respectively at Pearl Harbor and Eniwetok. She arrived at Guam on 24 October and reported for duty with Service Squadron 11 (ServRon 11). Not long thereafter, however, she was assigned temporarily to ServRon 10.

During her more than eight months at Guam, ARD-26 repaired warships damaged in the Leyte, Luzon, and Okinawa campaigns. While carrying out that mission, she reported to several different organizational entities, including ServRon 12, ServRon 10, and Naval Operating Base (NOB), Guam. In the second week in July 1945, the floating dry dock was towed to the Ryukyus where she transported equipment between various locations around Okinawa and docked warships for repairs. Her duty at Okinawa lasted until mid-August at which time she headed back to the Marianas. ARD-26 resumed her repair duties at Guam on 22 August 1945 and remained so employed for the next 17 years. In the latter part of 1962, the dry dock was towed back to the west coast of the United States. She was placed out of service in October 1962 and was berthed with the San Diego Group, Pacific Reserve Fleet.

ARD-26 did not remain inactive for long. Towed to the east coast in 1964, she underwent conversion to a medium auxiliary repair dry dock at Baltimore, Maryland by the Bethlehem Steel Corp. ARD-26 was named Alamogordo on 22 March 1965 and simultaneously redesignated ARDM-2. She was placed in service again on 3 August 1965. Alamogordo then moved south to Charleston, SC., where she became a support unit for Submarine Squadron 18 (SubRon 18). She continued to provide repair services to the boats of SubRon 18 at Charleston for more than two decades.

After being taken out of service, Alamogordo was laid up at Fort Eustis, Virginia in the James River division of the National Defense Reserve Fleet. She was struck from the Naval Vessel Register on 23 November 1993. On 18 December 2000, ex-Alamogordo was transferred to Ecuador under the Security Assistance Program.
