= USS Endurance (ARDM-3) =

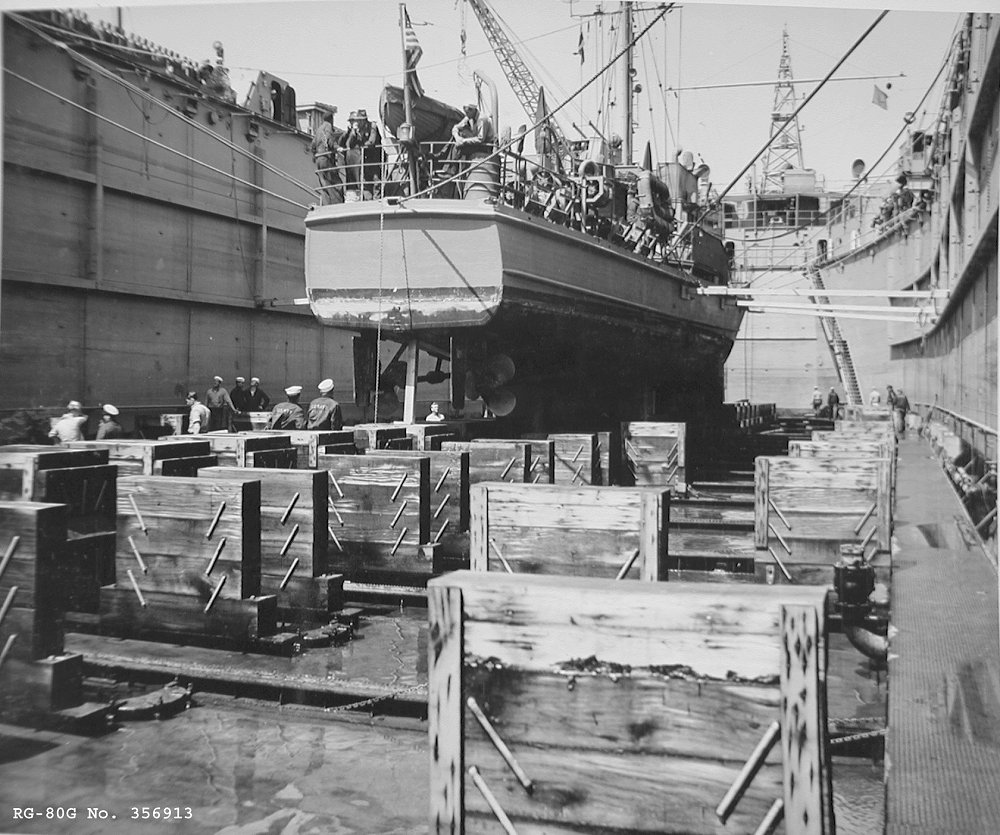
- USS ARD-18 with USS SC-1372 in her basin while undergoing training at the Floating Dry Dock Training Center, Tiburon, CA., 1 April 1944.

History

United States
- Name: USS Endurance (ARDM-3)
- Builder: Pacific Bridge Company, Alameda, CA
- Acquired: 1 February 1944
- Stricken: 31 July 1995
- Fate: Disposed of by transferring to the Local Redevelopment Authority, 1 April 1996

General characteristics (as built)
- Class & type: ARD-12-class floating dry dock
- Displacement: 6.800 tons
- Length: 491 ft 8 in (149.86 m)
- Beam: 81 ft (24.7 m)
- Draft: 33 ft 3 in (10.13 m)
- Propulsion: None
- Complement: 120
- Armament: 2 × 40 mm AA guns; 2 × 20 mm AA guns

General characteristics (as refit)
- Class & type: ARDM-1-class floating dry dock
- Length: 536 ft 1 in (163.40 m)

USS Endurance (ARDM-3) was originally laid down as ARD-18, a non self-propelled United States Navy Auxiliary floating drydock in 1944. Built by the Pacific Bridge Company in Alameda, California. During World War II USS ARD-18 was assigned to the Asiatic-Pacific Theater and serviced ships at Guadalcanal, Ulithi, and Leyte-Samar Naval Base. After the war, floating dry dock ARD-18 was sent to Norfolk Shipbuilding and Drydock Corp.'s yard, circa 1967-68 and was lengthened by adding a 100 ft (30 m) midsection as well as an additional deck above the uppermost crane deck. Redesignated Medium Auxiliary Repair Dry Dock Endurance (ARDM-3), she served until retirement in 1995.
