= USS S-46 =

Submarine of the United States

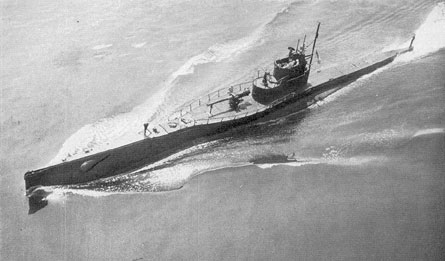
- United States Submarine S-46 underway in 1925

History

United States
- Name: USS S-46
- Builder: Bethlehem Shipbuilding Corporation, Quincy, Massachusetts
- Laid down: 23 February 1921
- Launched: 11 September 1923
- Sponsored by: Miss Grace Roosevelt
- Commissioned: 5 June 1925
- Decommissioned: 2 November 1945
- Stricken: 16 November 1945
- Fate: Sold for scrapping November 1946

General characteristics
- Class & type: S-class submarine
- Displacement: 850 long tons (864 t) surfaced; 1,126 long tons (1,144 t) submerged
- Length: 225 ft 3 in (68.66 m)
- Beam: 20 ft 8 in (6.30 m)
- Draft: 16 ft (4.9 m)
- Speed: 14.5 knots (16.7 mph; 26.9 km/h) surfaced, 11 knots (13 mph; 20 km/h) submerged
- Complement: 42 officers and men
- Armament: 1 × 4 in (102 mm)/50 deck gun, 4 × 21 inch (533 mm) torpedo tubes

Service record
- Operations: World War II
- Awards: 1 battle star

USS S-46 (SS-157) was a third-group (S-42) S-class submarine of the United States Navy.

== Construction and commissioning ==
S-46′s keel was laid down on 23 February 1921 by the Bethlehem Shipbuilding Corporation's Fore River Shipyard in Quincy, Massachusetts. She was launched on 11 September 1923, sponsored by Miss Grace Roosevelt, and commissioned on 5 June 1925.

== Service history ==
=== Inter-War Period ===
After training exercises off southern New England, S-46 sailed for the Panama Canal Zone to join Submarine Division 19 (SubDiv 19). Arriving at Coco Solo on 26 September, she commenced a schedule of local operations from Coco Solo and Balboa, Panama, which were interrupted only for semi-annual extended training cruises and annual fleet problems in the Caribbean Sea and Pacific Ocean. Repairs and overhauls were performed at Balboa.

In 1927, SubDiv 19 was transferred to the Battle Fleet and based at San Diego, California, with Mare Island Naval Shipyard as homeyard for its boats. S-46 departed Panama on 11 June, arrived at San Diego on 31 July, then proceeded to Pearl Harbor to participate in tactical exercises with other Battle Fleet submarines. During the latter part of August, she participated in the search for missing Dole Air Race pilots, and at the end of the month, she headed back to San Diego for two months of local operations. In December, she returned to Mare Island for an overhaul, and in June 1928, she resumed operations out of her home port. In November, despite many attempts to improve design limitations of the third-group (S-42) class, the maximum speed set for S-46, and others of that class, was reduced to 10.5 knots to eliminate excessive vibration and accompanying engineering problems at higher speeds.

S-46 remained based at San Diego until December 1930, when her division was transferred to Pearl Harbor. There, for the next five years, she participated in training operations with SubDiv 11 and with other fleet units, and spent extended periods of time in port as a unit of Rotating Reserve Division 14 (RotResDiv 14). In the spring of 1936, after participating in Fleet Problem XVII, she returned to Coco Solo, where she had again been homeported.

Still in SubDiv 11, S-46 remained based at Coco Solo through the end of the decade, operating on a schedule similar to that of her first tour in the Canal Zone. After September 1939, however, operations were confined to the canal approaches. In the spring of 1941, SubDiv 11 was ordered to New London to assist in patrols off the New England coast and in Submarine School training operations. En route north, S-46 underwent overhaul at Philadelphia, Pennsylvania, and, in August, she commenced operations out of New London. In October, she shifted to Ordnance Island, Bermuda, and in December, after the attack on Pearl Harbor, she returned to the Panama Canal Zone.

=== World War II ===
During the next six weeks, she conducted two defensive war patrols in the approaches to the canal, then prepared to cross the Pacific. On 5 March 1942, she headed west with SubDiv 53. In mid-April, the World War I-design submarines arrived at their new base, Brisbane, Queensland, and joined Task Force 42 (TF 42). On 13 May, S-46 departed on her third patrol—her first offensive war patrol.

On leaving Moreton Bay, the S-boat conducted sound training exercises with a Royal Australian Navy escort, then continued on. On 15 May, the ship's cook was discovered to have the mumps. On 16 May, the boat put into Townsville, Queensland, and on 22 May, after hospitalizing sick crew members and disinfecting messing, berthing, and working areas, she set a course for her patrol area, New Britain.

On 26 May, S-46 passed Rossel Island. On 31 May, she began her transit of St. George's Channel, favoring the New Ireland coast. That night, she hunted in the approaches to Rabaul and between there and the Duke of York Islands. On the night of 1–2 June, while patrolling on the Rabaul-New Hanover line, she was spotted by two Japanese destroyers, but no attacks were made.

On 3 June, the submarine began hunting along the northern coast of New Britain. On 4 June, west of the Willaumez Peninsula, she developed motor trouble and turned for Vitiaz Strait, one of the few areas for which she carried charts. On 5 June, she entered the strait, and on 7 June, she commenced patrolling between Cape Cretin and the south end of Dampier Strait. Two days later, she was ordered to intercept Japanese destroyers thought to be heading for Lae on an estimated course which would take them north of Woodlark Island.

Moving into the area, S-46 sighted no enemy ships and resumed her patrol in the Cape Cretin area. On 11 June, she headed for Brisbane. On 19 June, an auxiliary air compressor jammed, the motor burned out, and the resulting smoke added further habitability problems to the already hot and humid condition of the boat. On 21 June, S-46 reached Brisbane.

From 20 July-15 August, S-46 hunted in the Solomon Islands. From 11 September-11 October, she resumed a defensive role and patrolled in an area east of Normanby Island, Papua New Guinea in anticipation of a major enemy attack of Milne Bay.

In early November, S-46 started back across the Pacific. On 7 January 1943, she arrived in the Panama Canal Zone, and in early February, she continued on to Philadelphia, Pennsylvania. There, from April to mid-June, she received extensive repairs and alterations. She then returned to Panama; retransmitted the canal and proceeded to San Diego for further yard work. In mid-September, she moved north to Unalaska in the Aleutian Islands.

Based at Dutch Harbor, S-46 ranged westward into the Kuril Islands in two patrols: one in October–November 1943, and another from December 1943-January 1944. During the first, she damaged an enemy oiler in the Paramushiro area; during the second, she was scoreless. On returning to Dutch Harbor after her last war patrol, she was assigned to antisubmarine training activities.

For the remainder of the war, S-46 provided training services in the Aleutians, in the Hawaiian Islands and off the coast of California. In the latter area from January 1945, she operated under the Commander, West Coast Sound School, San Diego. After the cessation of hostilities in August, she was ordered to San Francisco, California, for inactivation, and in late September, she moved up the bay to Mare Island Naval Shipyard.

== Decommissioning and disposal ==
S-46 was decommissioned on 2 November 1945. Her name was struck from the Naval Vessel Register two weeks later, and her hulk was sold for scrapping to the Salco Iron and Metal Company, San Francisco, in November 1946.

== Awards ==
- American Defense Service Medal
- American Campaign Medal
- Asiatic-Pacific Campaign Medal with one battle star
- World War II Victory Medal
