= USS Waterford =

WWII American auxiliary repair dock

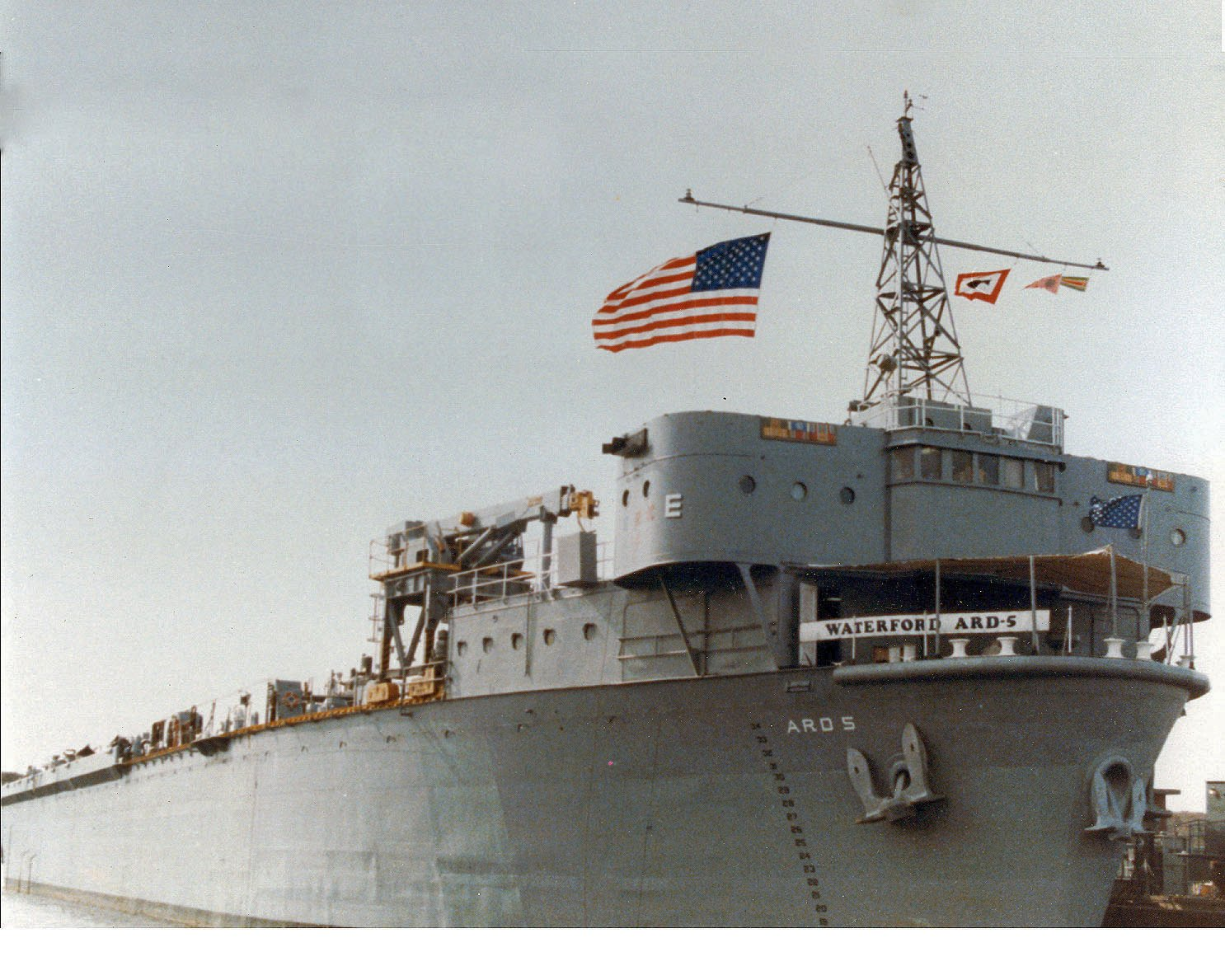
- USS Waterford (ARD-5) at New London, Connecticut

History

United States
- Name: USS Waterford
- Namesake: Waterford, Connecticut
- Builder: Pacific Bridge Company
- Laid down: 22 September 1941
- Launched: 12 March 1942
- Commissioned: 3 July 1943
- Decommissioned: 9 September 1997
- Reinstated: 1999, Chilean Navy
- Motto: "We Lift The Fleet!" "We Preserve"
- Status: In service with Chilean Navy

General characteristics
- Class & type: ARD-2-class Auxiliary Repair Dock
- Displacement: 4,800 tons (Light)
- Length: 482 Feet, 7 Inches
- Beam: 71 Feet
- Draft: 5 Feet
- Complement: 6 Officers, 125 Enlisted
- Armament: Two single 20 mm gun mounts

USS Waterford (ARD-5) was an Auxiliary floating drydock that served in the United States Navy during World War II, the Korean War, the Vietnam War, and the Persian Gulf War. She later served the Chilean Navy as Talcahuano (133).

== Ship History ==
Waterford (ARD-5) was originally the unnamed, steel-hulled, auxiliary repair drydock ARD-5. She was completed in June 1942 at Alameda, California, by the Pacific Bridge Company. During the war, she served Pearl Harbor and San Francisco. At the end of World War II she was serving at the navy yard at Mare Island, California. She remained there until shifting to the east coast to serve the repair needs of the Atlantic Fleet. ARD-5 was named Waterford on 17 November 1976. She remained active, "in service" with the Atlantic Fleet into 1979—serving Groton and Naval Submarine Base New London. In 1984, Waterford assisted in repairs of the USS Sculpin.

=== Fate ===
In February 1997, the nuclear research submarine NR-1 docked, and undocked by late March. Waterford was decommissioned on 9 September 1997, and struck from the Naval Register on 1 October 1997. On 10 March 1999, she was disposed of via the Security Assistance Program to the Republic of Chile. She was renamed Talcahuano (133) on 30 August 1999.

International radio call sign of USS Waterford
November	Charlie	Echo	Alpha

== Ship Awards ==

Navy Meritorious Unit Commendation	Battle Effectiveness Award with Wreathed 'E' (7 awards)	American Campaign Medal
Asiatic-Pacific Campaign Medal	World War II Victory Medal	National Defense Service Medal with 2 service stars
