= Naval Base Panama Canal Zone =

Bases of the United States Navy in the Panama Canal Zone

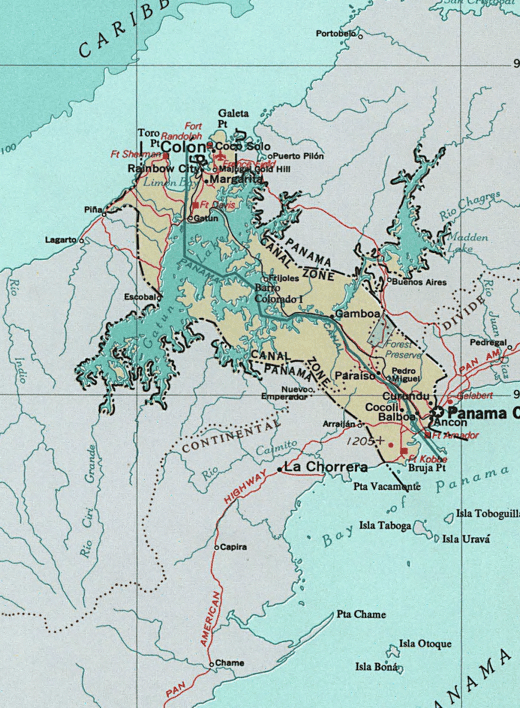
Panama Canal Zone map

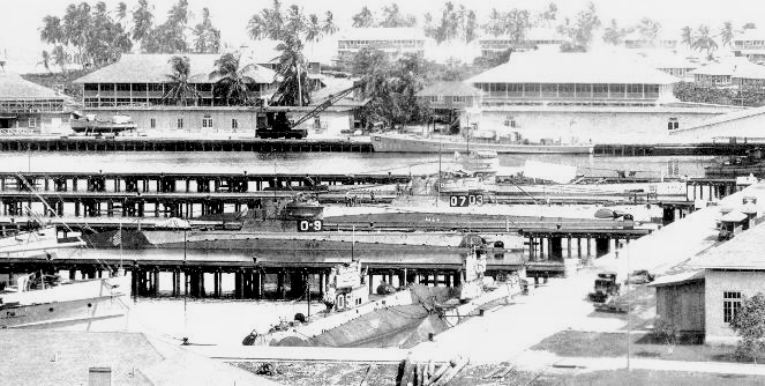
O-class submarines at Coco Solo in 1923.

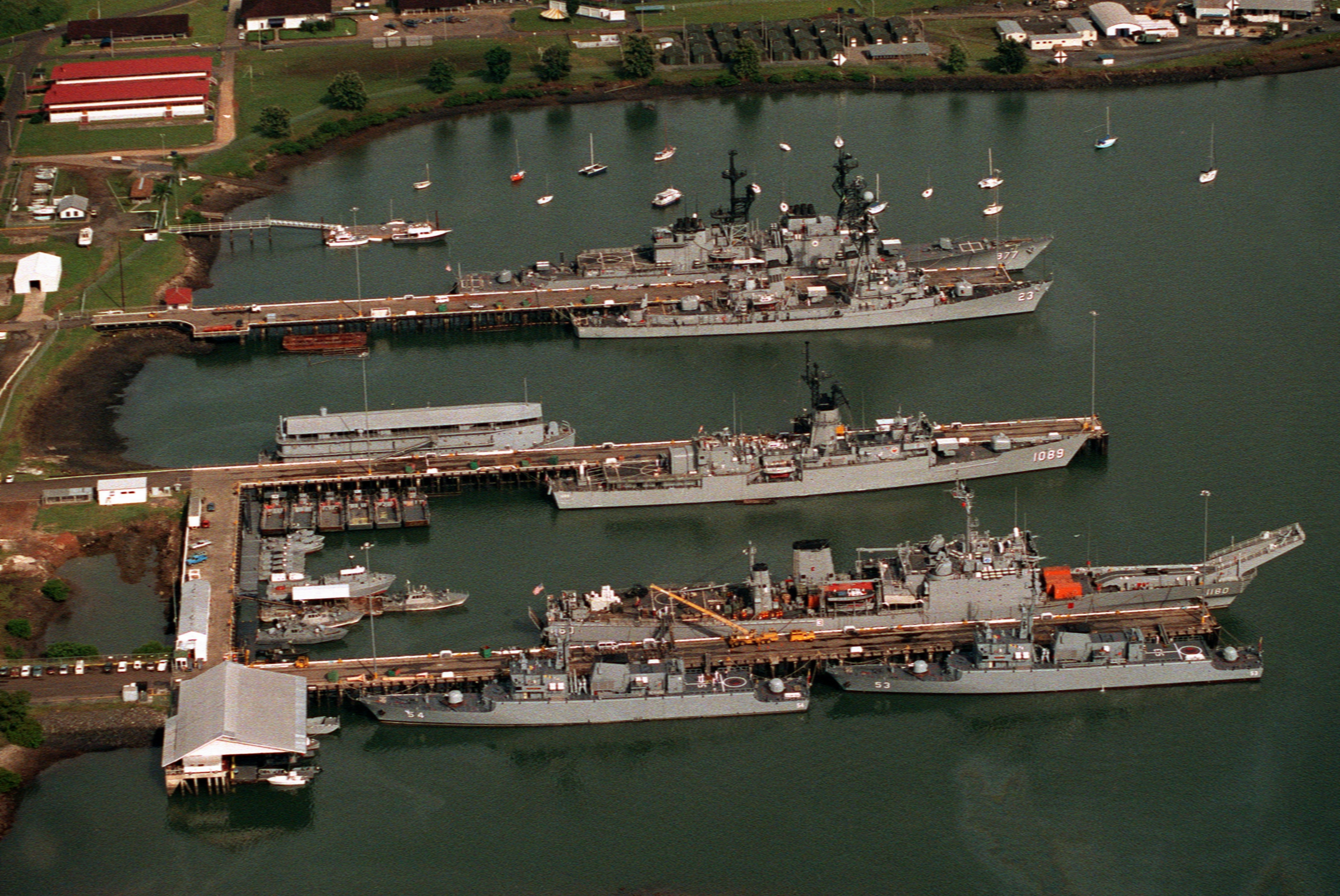
Rodman Naval Station in 1989 with USS Briscoe (DD-977), USS Richard E. Byrd (DDG-23), Jesse L. Brown , Manitowoc, and the Colombian ARC USS Independiente (54) and ARC Antioquia (FM-53)

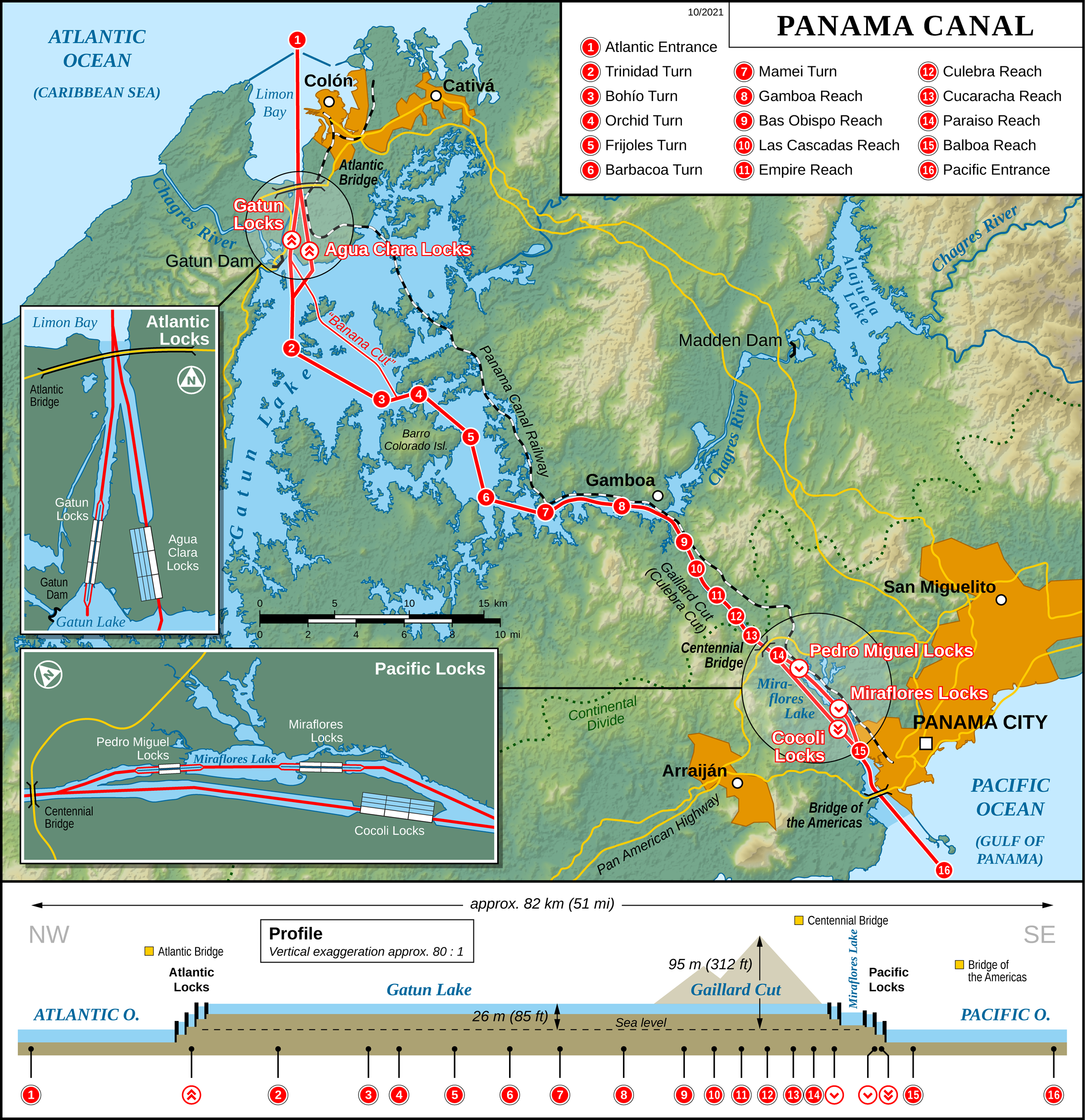
A schematic of the Panama Canal, illustrating the sequence of locks and passages

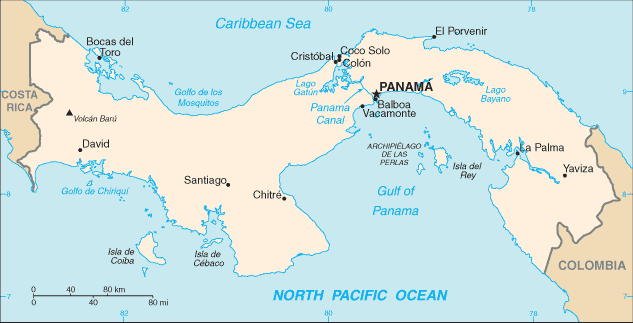
Location of Panama between the Pacific Ocean (bottom) and the Caribbean Sea (top), with the canal at top center

From 1917 to 1997 the United States Navy had a number of bases in the Panama Canal Zone. They were used during World War II to both protect the Panama Canal and the key shipping lanes around the Panama Canal Zone. Bases were built and operated on the Atlantic Ocean side and the Pacific Ocean side. The main Naval Base at the Panama Canal was the Naval Station Coco Solo that had been in operation since 1918.

From 1918 to 1993 Fort Amador in Balboa was the naval headquarters. From 1940 to 1941, the Fifteenth Naval District Headquarters building was in Bryan Hall. In 1997 Fifteenth Naval District was abolished; naval responsibility for the Panama area shifted to a headquarters at Naval Station Mayport in Florida.

The U.S. Navy worked with the Panama Canal Zone (1917–1979) in operation at the Panama Canal, especially the Port of Balboa (also called Port Ancon), which they shared.

== History ==
In 1821 Panama voluntarily became part of Colombia. In 1903, the United States supported the group that wanted to separate from Colombia. After Panama separated from Colombia that same year, Panama and the US signed the Hay–Bunau-Varilla Treaty. This gave the United States rights to the 553-square-mile, 10-mile-wide Panama Canal Zone, a US Territory with its capital in Balboa.

The Canal opened a waterway from the Atlantic to the Pacific, bypassing the Strait of Magellan. Construction started 4 May 1904 and was completed 15 August 1914.

Due to U-boat operations, the Canal Zone was put under the military authority of the Army's Panama Canal Department in 1939. Japan lost Canal use on 22 July 1941 because of its aggression in China. Canal Zone defenses were increased due to the strategic importance of the waterway. The Navy installed anti-torpedo nets and naval mines. Bases installed smoke generators, anti-aircraft guns, long-range radar systems, searchlights, and aircraft warning stations. Troops were deployed to Colón, Margarita Island, and Toro Point's Fort Sherman. For coast defense, eleven 16-inch Naval guns were installed.

The Panama Canal Department remained as the senior Army headquarters in the region until activation of the Caribbean Defense Command (CDC) on 10 February 1941. Both commands were located at the relatively new headquarters at Quarry Heights. The CDC was commanded by Lieutenant General Daniel Van Voorhis, who continued to command the Panama Canal Department.

The 15th Naval District was in charge of Navy activities in the Canal Zone. Two airfields operated 30 fighter aircraft with Curtiss P-36 Hawks and Curtiss P-40 Warhawks for protection. A seaplane base had regular submarine patrols. Due to these defenses, U-boats and Imperial Japanese Navy submarines did not attack or approach the Canal Zone.

With the loss of the Dutch East Indies oil fields, the vast Canal Zone tank farms became the supply line for fuel needed to fight the Pacific War. Many tankers and cargo ships were lost in the early part of the Battle of the Atlantic. To aid the war effort, fuel oil pipelines were built along the Canal, resulting in a decreased number of tankers traversing the waterway. The first pipeline opened 18 April 1943 and the second pipeline opened at the end of 1943. A diesel and separate gasoline pipeline were opened the following year.

By April 1943, the US believed the threat to the Canal had diminished, the Canal's defense status was downgraded, and there was a reduction in troop bases. Naval bases at the Canal Zone were supported during World War II and afterwards by the larger Naval Base Trinidad. However, Axis powers did plan to bomb the Canal. Nazi Germany had Operation Pelikan, but the plan was aborted. In August 1943, Japan planned to bomb the Canal with planes launched from Submarine aircraft carriers, such as the I-400-class submarines with three Seiran aircraft each. Japanese military trained for the Panama Canal attack, but the plan was canceled in June 1945 because the war was taking a toll on the country. Japan then planned to attack a closer major base, Naval Base Ulithi, but Japan surrendered before the base was attacked.

With Japan's surrender, the submarine aircraft carriers were instructed to destroy the planes, which were sunk. The three I-400-class submarines were captured by the US Navy.

To manage the Canal Zone, the US founded the Panama Canal Company, a government-owned corporation that operated the Canal and other Canal Zone enterprises such as the Panama Railroad and the Port of Balboa. The Company was run by a board of directors appointed by the President of the United States. The Torrijos–Carter Treaties of 1979 ended the Panama Canal Company. That year, the Canal Zone was renamed the Reverted Areas, as this was the start of the process of turning over the Canal. The Canal Zone was returned to the Republic of Panama on 1 October 1979 per the Torrijos–Carter Treaties.

== Naval Bases Panama Canal Zone ==
Base used to protect the Panama Canal Zone in World War II:

- Naval Station Coco Solo, Fleet Post Office, FPO# 1955 (1918–1999) Atlantic side
  - US Submarine Base Coco Solo
  - NAS Upham, at NAS Coco Solo, Seaplane Base, FPO# 720
  - Coco Solo ammunition depot
  - Coco Solo Naval Hospital on 17 hectares (41 acres), 4.8 kilometres (3 mi) from the Coco Solo air station, In 1954 transferred to Canal Zone Government
- Naval Section base Cristobal at Cristóbal, Colón, site of the original 1918 base, WW2 troop housing
  - Cristobal Repair Depot two marine railways
  - Cristobal Dry Dock built in 1907
  - Cristobal administrative HQ for Atlantic side
  - Cristobal tank farm (Fort De Lesseps)
    - Mount Hope tank farm, Atlantic side, Colón 9.331515°N 79.897015°W
- Naval Base Taboga Island, PT Boat Base, FPO# 40
- David Field, Naval Air Land Base, at David, Chiriquí FPO# 19, now Enrique Malek International Airport, Pacific side
- Rodman Naval Station now PSA Panama International Terminal (1932–1999 on 240 hectares (600 acres))
  - Arraijan tank farm, for Rodman, Pacific side 8.95325°N 79.61466°W
  - Arraijan Ammo depot for Rodman, Pacific side 8.968049°N 79.608799°W
- Port of Balboa Naval Base, Pacific side (Panama City) (1915–1999) 8.959242°N 79.566581°W
- Balboa 15th Naval District headquarters
  - Balboa Naval Depot, at Balboa, Panama, Naval Supply Depot and Hospital, FPO# 121
  - Balboa Dry docks for repair
  - Balboa ammunition depot and Marine Barracks Panama Canal (1939–1999)
  - Balboa tank farm 330 hectares (820 acres)
  - Balboa Naval Hospital
  - Balboa Fort Amador, Navy Sector at Fort Amador was 55 hectares (137 acres) (1914–1995) (Fort Clayton)
- Gatun tank farm, at Gatun Lake, 690 hectares (1,700 acres)

9.31035°N 79.88425°W

  - Gatun Lake floating nuclear power plant model MH-1A (1968–1976)
- Camp Rousseau, Rousseau Naval Hospital on 50-acre during WW2, Atlantic side
- Almirante Fuel depot, small base at Almirante, Atlantic side.
- Trans-Panama pipeline built and used in World War 2, four pipes and pumping stations.
- Camp Elliott US Marines, (1904–1927) Culebra, renamed Camp Gaillard Atlantic side
- Camp Otis US Marines, east of Camp Gaillard, Atlantic side

Canal Zone Naval Radio Stations

- Farfan, at Rodman Naval Station, FPO# 63 and FPO# 121, Farfan Radio Station (331 hectares (819 acres)) Pacific side 8.93222°N 79.58194°W
- Toro Point, at Fort Sherman, on Bahía Limón radio compass station FPO# 35 and FPO# 122, Box 30 Atlantic side
- Cape Mala, FPO# 17, Radio Compass Station on Punta Mala just south of Pedasí, Los Santos
- Summit, FPO# 39 and FPO# 121, Box 20, in Soberanía National Park 9.07833°N 79.64889°W
- Gatun, at Fort Davis at Gatun Lake, radio station FPO# 122, Box 60 (Fort Gulick)

Post World War II:

- Naval Small Craft Instruction and Technical Training School (NAVSCIATTS) (1969–1999))
- Galeta Island (1965–1999)
- Cocoli Navy housing opened in 1952, near Cocoli Locks

== Naval Station Coco Solo ==
Naval Station Coco Solo and Submarine Base Coco Solo was founded in 1917, near Fort Randolph, as a submarine base to protect the Canal Zone on the Atlantic Ocean side. Starting in 1914 with five United States C-class submarines that were stationed at the base. In 1919 the C-class submarines were retired. In 1920 USS O-12, USS O-13, USS O-15, and USS O-16 arrived at the base and were retired in 1924. The USS O-5 sank after being hit by the SS Abangarez on 28 October 1923. In 1914 USS S-44 and other S-class submarines were stationed at Coco Solo till 1931. USS S-48 was stationed at the base from 1931 to 1935. USS S-43 for two-year at the base. USS S-45 at the base from 1935 to 1940. In 1940 three V-boat submarines, USS Barracuda, USS Bass and USS Bonita were stationed at Coco Solo though most of the war. Coco Solo Naval Hospital operated at the base during the war. The Navy had a major ship and submarine repair base built at Coco Solo. Submarine Base Coco Solo was also used as a training ground for new crews before being moved to more forward war action. New crews would patrol the water protecting the Canal Zone. The base was very busy during World War II: with patrols, training, refueling and repairing vessels. By 1969, Naval shipyard activity had ended. By the 1980s all Navy work was moved to The Naval Station on Galeta Island. The base closed in 1999, the site is now the Manzanillo International Terminal. US Senator John McCain was born in 1936 at the small Navy hospital at Coco Solo Naval Air Station. 9.37262°N 79.8812°W

=== NAS Coco Solo ===
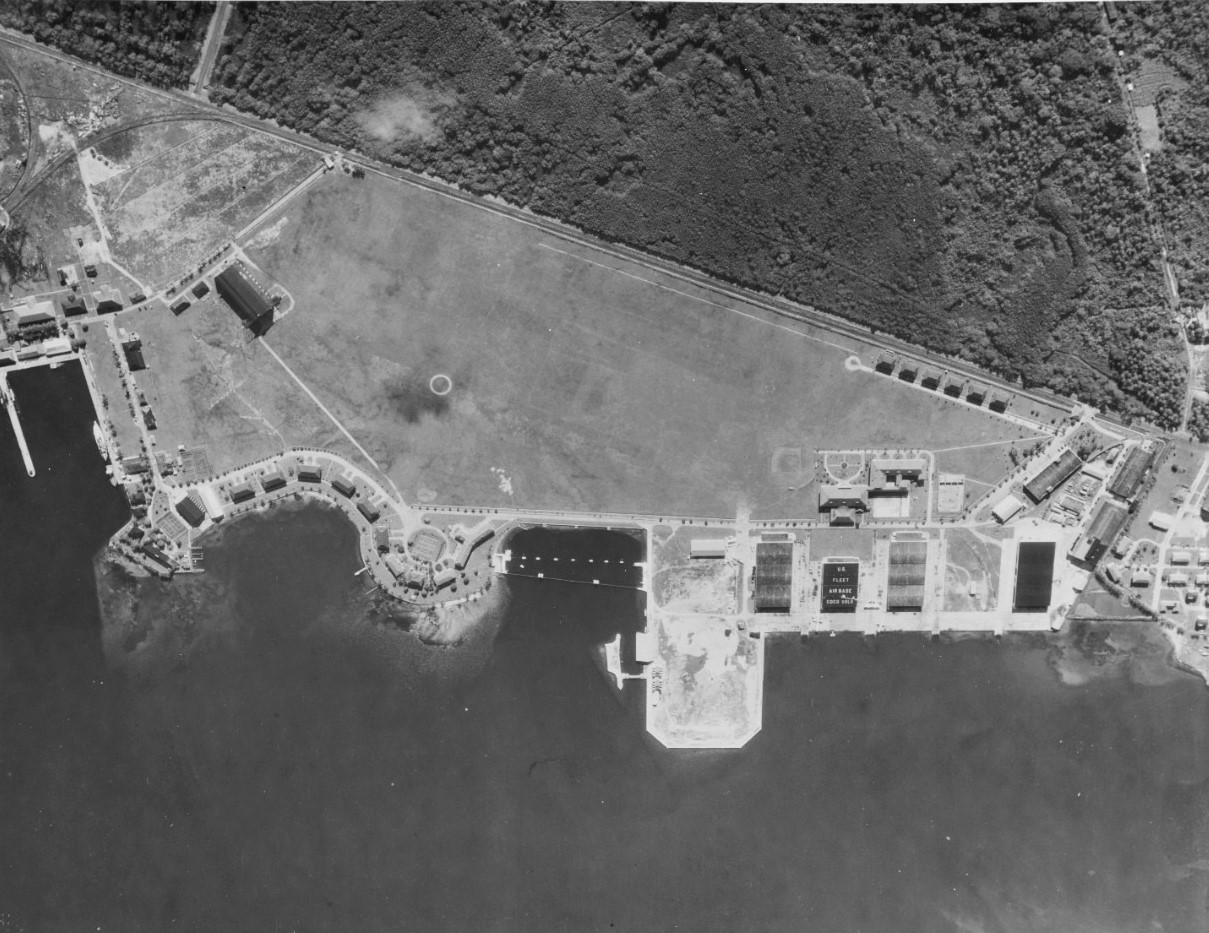
NAS Coco Solo in 1937

NAS Coco Solo had a small runway, three plane hangars, one blimp hangar, three seaplane ramps and tank farm. During the war the base added an engine test depot, a large aircraft assembly depot and a large repair depot. A new runway was built next to the Army runway. Seaplane unit VP-1 was transferred to NAS Coco Solo on 10 October 1943 operating under FAW-3. 9.372287°N 79.882746°W

=== NAS Upham ===
NAS Upham also called NAS Coco Solo was a seaplane base of the US Navy. Named after Admiral Frank B. Upham. NAS Upham seaplanes did U-boat patrols over the Antilles, the Caribbean, and coasts of South America. The base flew Glenn L. Martin PM-2 seaplane founded on 1 September 1931 as VP-5S. The Naval unit based at NAS Upham was FAW-3. The PM-2 seaplane was an older design from the 1930s Naval Aircraft Factory PN. The PM-2 seaplanes were replaced by Consolidated P2Ys retired in 1941. The P2Y was replaced by the Consolidated PBY Catalinas used till the end of the war. While the US did not enter World War II until 1941, On 8 September 1939, President Franklin D. Roosevelt issued a proclamation of a limited" national emergency. Part of the proclamation stated "neutrality patrols". The "neutrality patrols" were flown out of NAS Guantanamo Bay, Cuba, San Juan, Puerto Rico and NAS Coco Solo in Panama. Naval Seaplane Unit VP-33, known as Wings over Panama, was trained and sent to base for patrols. In 1941 anti submarine bombing was added to the training and the unit was designated VP-32. After the bombing of Pearl Harbor the VP-32 at NAS Upham started patrolling the Pacific Ocean around the Panama Canal for Empire of Japan vessels also. In early 1942 NAS Upham had 28 PBY seaplanes with planes added from VP-52 and VP-81. NAS Upham had convoy escort duty added to its anti-submarine patrols. Later in the war the larger and newer Martin PBM Mariner seaplanes were added to NAS Upham. Martin PBM had a bombing rack and in July 1943 three German U-boats were sunk after being found with the newer ASG radar. The U-boats sunk were: U-159 south of Haiti; U-759 east of Jamaica; and U-359 south of Puerto Rico. VPB-32 transferred to NAS Norfolk on 8 July 1944 and patrolled the Atlantic seaboard. 9.372287°N 79.882746°W

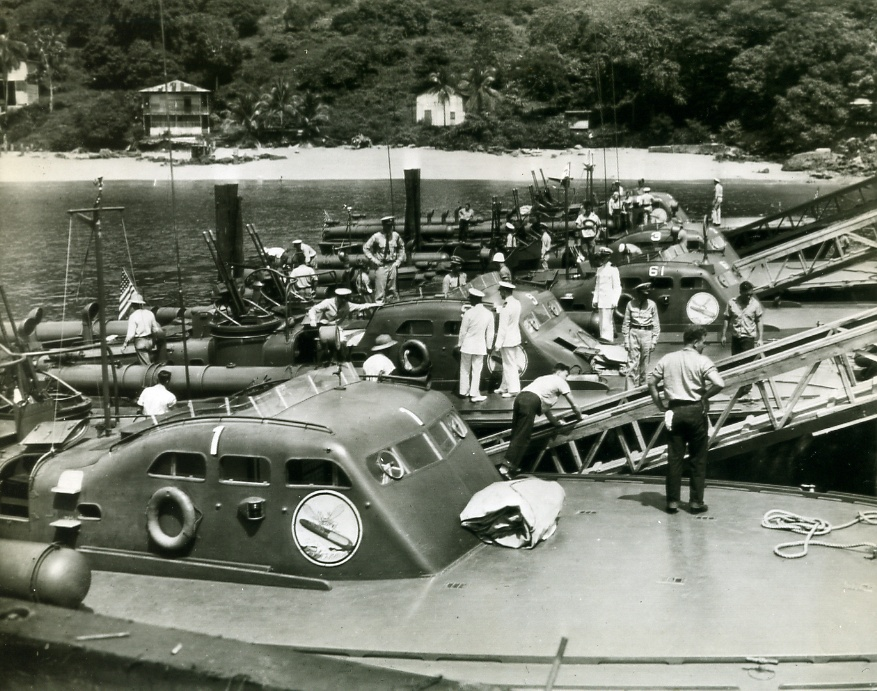
PT Boat Base Taboga Island on 1 August 1942

== PT Boat Base Taboga Island ==
PT Boat Base Taboga Island on Taboga Island in the Gulf of Panama was opened in 1942 at Pacific Canal entrance, under Panama Sea Frontier. An Advance base and PT boat base were built in 1942 and completed in 1944. The Navy built a PT Boat overhaul depot at Taboga Island with two small marine railways and a PT Boat training base. The base had a torpedo workshop, and munitions storage depot. At its peak the base had 47 PT boats and 1,200 troops. After the crew was trained and the PT Boat completed sea trails, they would be sent to other US Naval Advance Bases. Seebees Detachment 1012 worked at the base. The base had a recreation camp was on nearby Morro Island. The PT Boat base was supported from Balboa Naval Supply Depot. The base was 20 kilometres (20,000 m) from Panama City, closed in March 1946. Taboga Island was included in the original 1903 treaty, Hay–Bunau-Varilla Treaty. The current Taboga Hotel was the PT-boat base barracks 8.7982°N 79.5549°W

== Rodman Naval Station ==
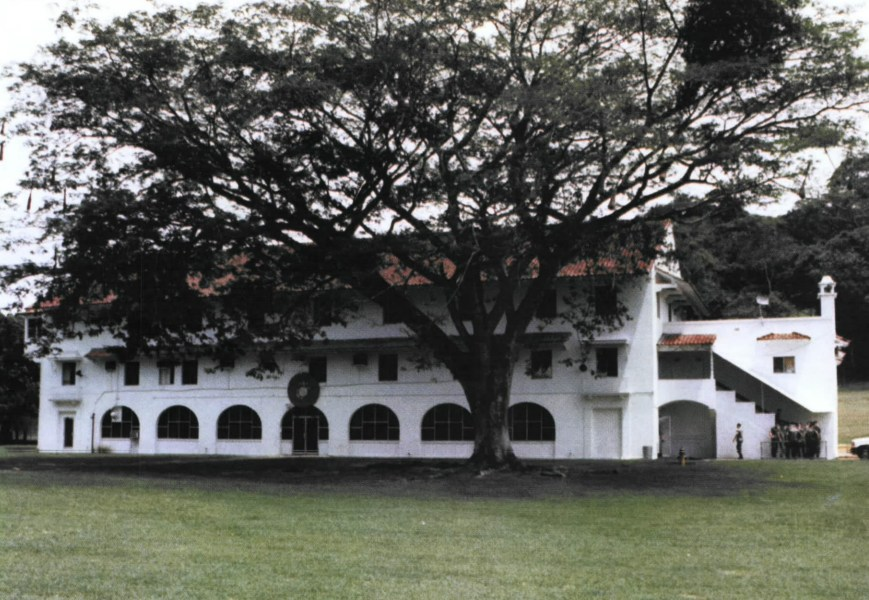
The Big House, headquarters at Rodman Naval Station in 1994.

Rodman Naval Station was founded in 1932 and construction was completed in 1937. Rodman Naval Station was across from Port of Balboa on the west side of the Canal, on the Pacific side near Panama City. (Rodman Naval Station is named after Commander-in-Chief of the US Pacific Fleet from 1919 to 1921, Admiral Hugh Rodman ( 6 January 1859 – 7 June 1940). Rodman was also the Marine Superintendent of the Panama Canal Zone in 1914. The east bank of the canal, Port of Balboa had become crowded, so the new base was built across the other side. The Commander in Chief (Commander-in-Chief) of the United States Atlantic Fleet, Southern Detachment (CINCLANTFLT Detachment South) had its headquarters seat at Rodman Naval Base. For World War II a large fuel depot was built and started operation in 1943, fueling ships in the Panama Canal. A ship repair depot was built at the base with 3 dry docks. The base was turned over to Panama on March 11, 1999. Rodman Naval Station included the Ordnance Department, Marine Barracks, the Lacona housing, Camp Rousseau and the Cocoli housing. The base is now called Vasco Nuñez de Balboa Naval Base. 8.9522°N 79.573°W

== Balboa Naval Yard and Base ==
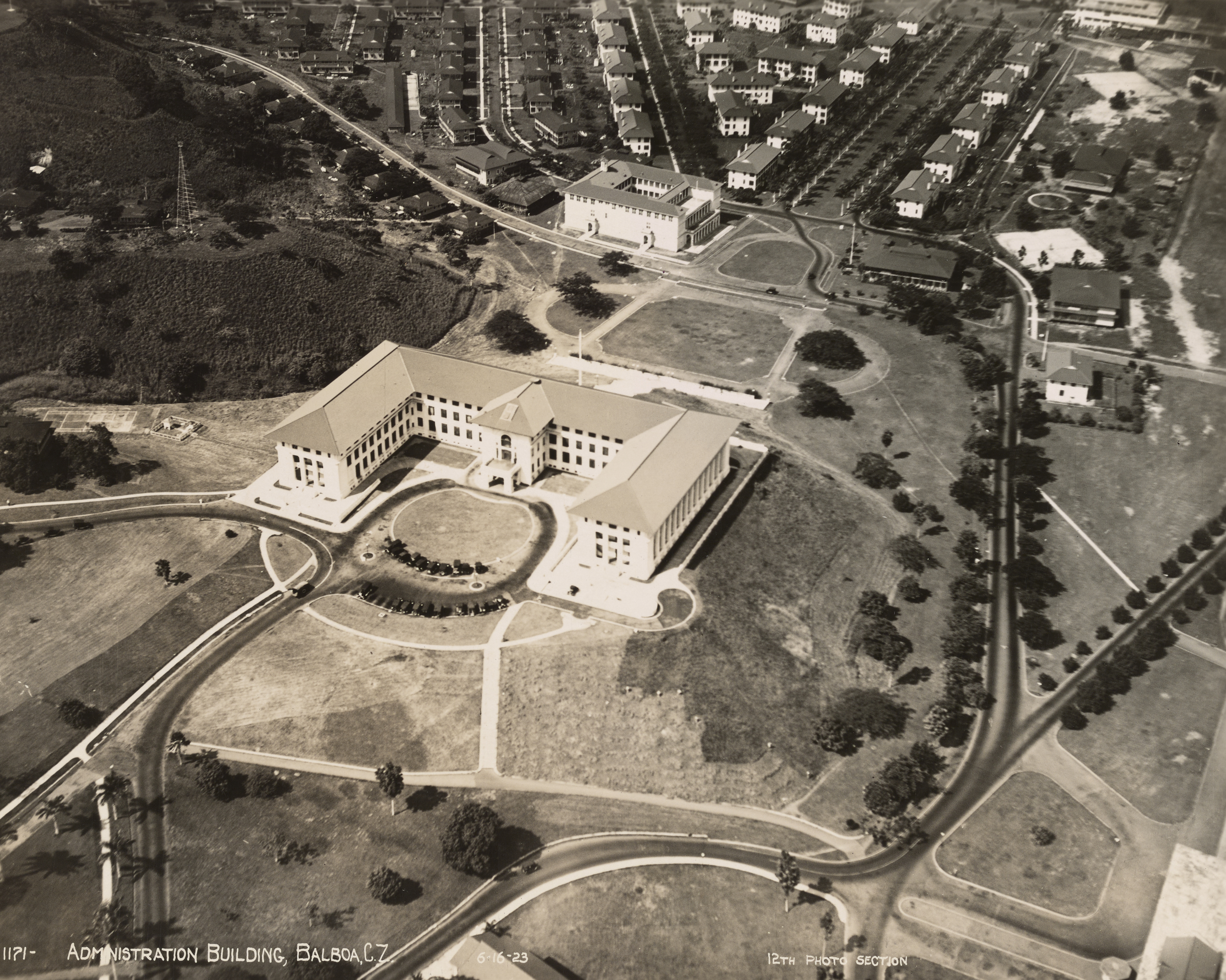
Panama Canal Zone headquarters on the hill at Baloboa Naval Depot 1941

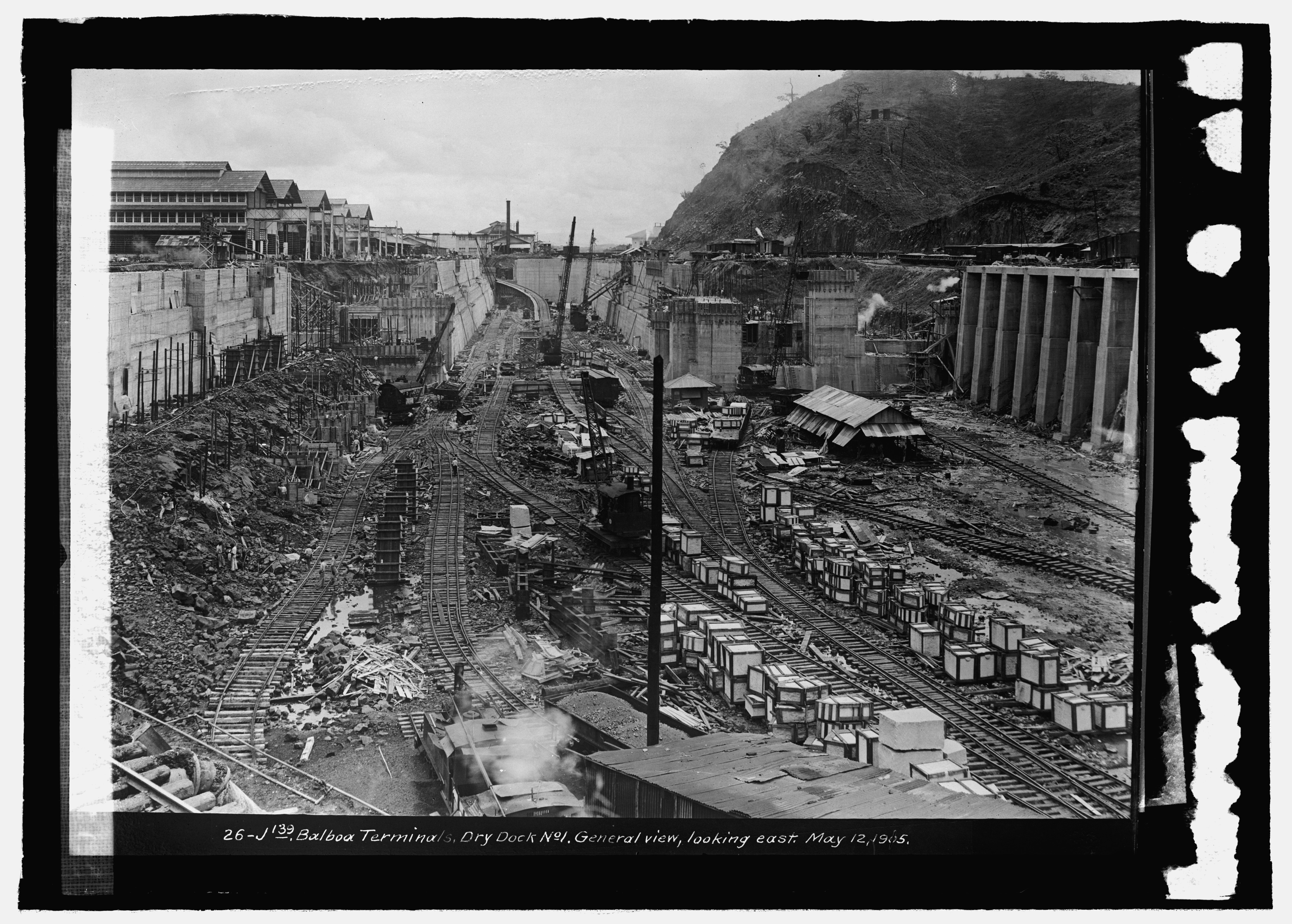
Balboa terminals and dry dock No. 1 being built

At the Port of Balboa, Balboa Terminal, Panama Canal Zone, the Navy had three dry docks for ship repair, Balboa Naval Depot, Balboa Naval Hospital, Balboa ammunition depot, 820-acre tank farm, refueling docks, net depot-weaving, large refrigerator storehouse and the Marine Barracks Panama Canal. The 15th Naval District headquarters was based Balboa on 26 hectares (65 acres). Before 1914, the Balboa was a marsh, before the US Navy took over the port, the site was developed by the Army Corps of Engineers during the Panama Canal construction. The 1914 Panama Canal Administration Building at Balboa seats on a hill overlooking the port, called Balboa Heights. Administration Building as extensive Canal art displays and the Goethals Monument. The Canal Zone Library and Museum opened in 1914 to showcase the Panama Canal construction. The largest Dry Dock, No. 1, completed in 1916, was able to repair battleships. The dry docks were used to repair some of the ships damaged in the Attack on Pearl Harbor in 1941. Port of Balboa was opened as the French Port La Boca, (the mouth) the US Navy renamed the port Port Ancon, after Ancon Hill, at the start of the Panama Canal construction, opening the port in 1909. In 1915, a US Navy VLF transmission station opened that radioed commands to US submarines based at Port of Balboa. The Navy also docked ships at Flamenco Island about 6.4 kilometres (4 mi) south of Port of Balboa. Flamenco Island is connected to the mainland by the Amador Causeway. The Amador Causeway was made from rock from the Canal construction. The Balboa drydocks became part of Astilleros Braswell International and now MEC Balboa Dry Docks Panama. Dry dock construction started in 1915. Work on drydock No. 2 was stopped in 1915, and not started again till January 1942. Once completed Drydock No. 2 could drydock two destroyers or two submarines at the same time. By the end of 1943, the Balboa Naval Yard was about the same size and capacity as Navy Yard Pearl Harbor at the end of 1941. For part of the dry Dock's history, since it opened in 1917, the dry dock was available for commercial ship repair. A 1921 rate card quotes a fee of 15 cents ($2.50 in 2022 dollars) per ton for dry docking and undocking, with a minimum charge. In 1920 the rate was 25 cents per ton ($3.59 in 2022). Six vessels were drydocked in 1920, of these two were subs USS R-25 and USS R-24, the other cargo ship, like the SS Katrina Luckenbach, also the yacht Carnegie. One of the first ship built at Balboa was the United States Navy patrol vessel, USS Pequeni in 1917.

- The Dry docks, also called graving dock, gates were the same as those used on the canal:
- Dock No. 1: 318 m by 39 m, gate entrance 33.6 m max draft 1.75 m, 8.953333°N 79.564444°W
- Dock No. 2: 130 m by 30.5 m gate entrance 25.9 m max draft 1.75 m 8.952311°N 79.566408°W
- Dock No. 3: 70 m by 16.8 m gate entrance 16.8 m max draft 1.46 m 8.952462°N 79.566730°W

Fort Amador

- At Balboa was Fort Amador, Navy Sector at Fort Amador was 55 hectares (137 acres). The Fifteenth Naval district headquartered was stationed at Fort Amador. At the fort was the Balboa Naval Radio Station built in 1914.

Naval Communications Station Balboa

- Naval Communications Station Balboa (NAVCOMMSTA BALBOA) opened in 1908. The Communications Station headquarters was next to the Fifteenth Naval District headquarters, the Naval part of Fort Amador. At the communications station, the Navy had a control center, a Naval cryptographic center and a fleet radio broadcast station. The Navy had a large receiver station at Farfan on the Atlantic side. A large Naval transmitter station was built at Summit, the high point on the Trans-Isthmian Highway. Summit had six 180-metre (600 ft) antennas. At Gatun was the VLF transmitter for submarines Communications. The bases were part of the Inter-American Naval Telecommunications Network. The Communications Station Balboa closed in 1999.

Farfan Housing Community near the 820-acre Farfan radio station, built in 1942, the Navy built a housing community in 1947 and 1948. Farfan Housing Community was built to support the growing base. At the Community 78 houses were built, called the Farfan reservation property.

== Seabees ==
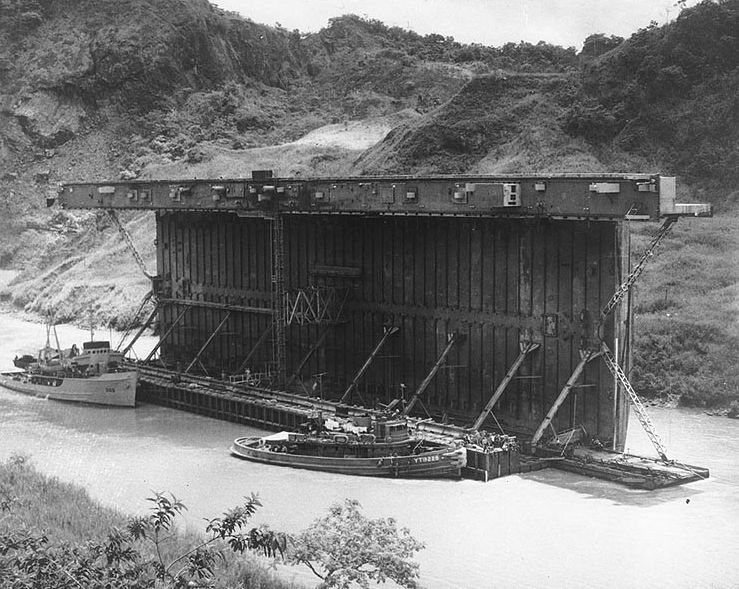
YFD-6 center section floated through the Panama Canal on its side. Towed by USS Alarka (YTB-229) (center) and USS Umpqua (ATA-209)(left) in 1945. Navy SeaBees designed and turned it on its side with many pontoons to fit through the canal

US Navy Seabees started working in the Canal Zone on 9 September 1942. Seabee Maintenance Unit 555 arrived in December 1943 and relieved the 1942 group. Seabee both did construction and operated power plants, shore batteries, tank farm, did maintenance work and more.

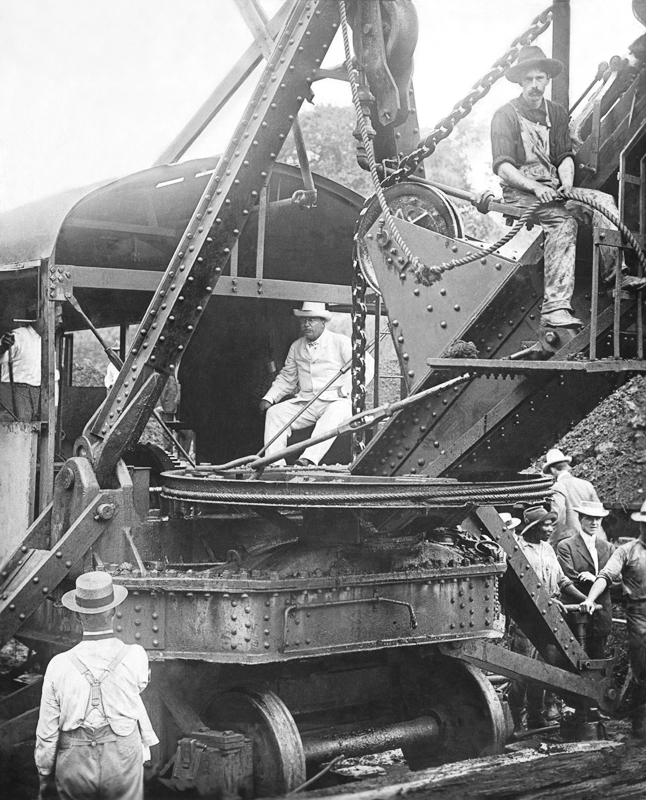
Theodore Roosevelt in Panama in 1906 on a Marion Steam Shovel built by the Marion Power Shovel Company

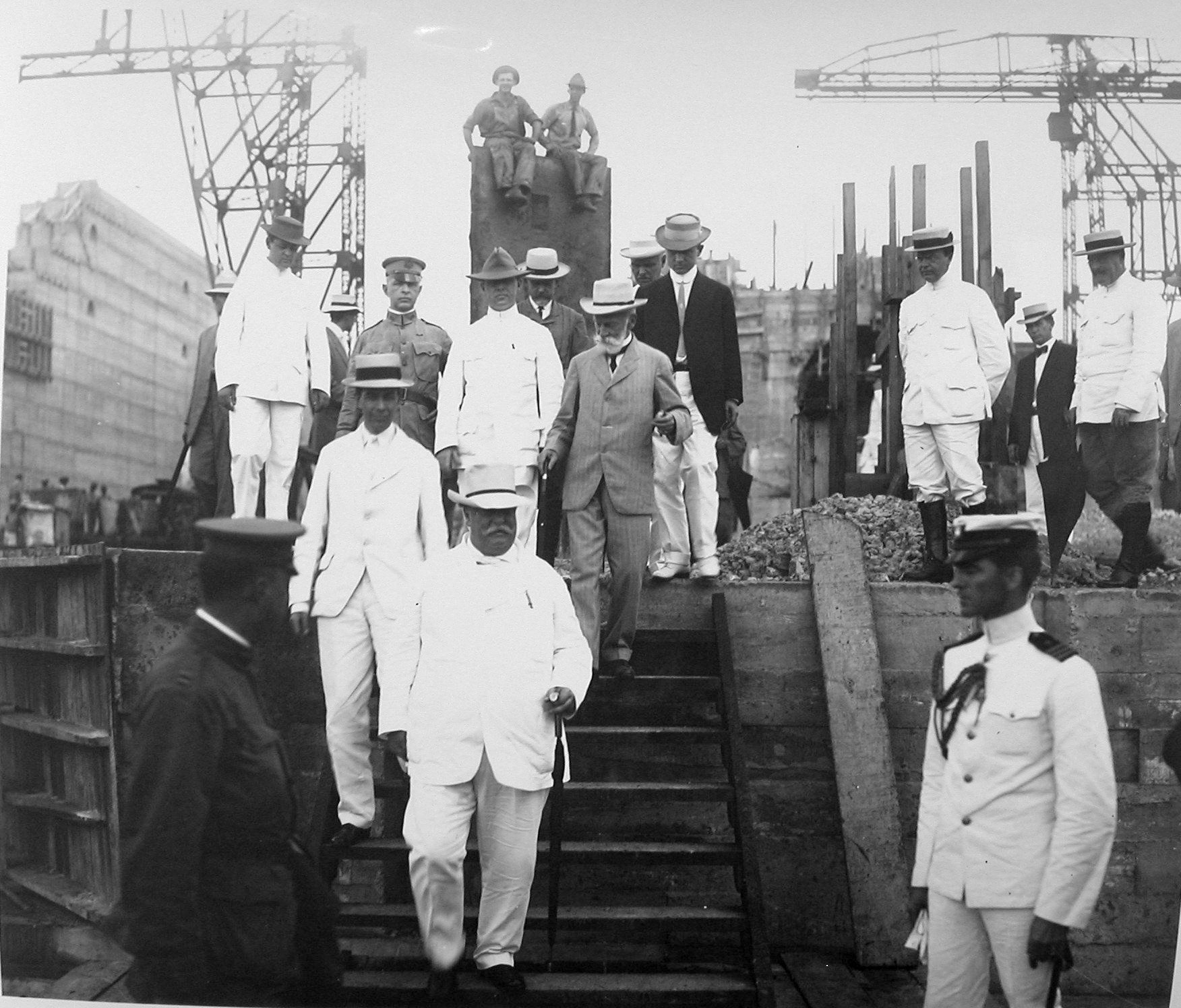
President Taft oversees the construction of the Panama Canal in November 1910.

=== Roosevelt's visit ===
On November 6, 1906, Theodore Roosevelt was the first president to depart the continental United States on an official diplomatic trip. Roosevelt made a 17-day trip to Panama and Puerto Rico. Roosevelt checked on the progress of the Canal's construction and talked to workers about the importance of the project. In Puerto Rico, he recommended that Puerto Ricans should become U.S. citizens. Roosevelt traveled to Panama on the US Navy ship the USS Louisiana. Theodore Roosevelt on May 6, 1904, had appointed John Findley Wallace, formerly chief engineer and finally general manager of the Illinois Central Railroad, as chief engineer of the Panama Canal Project. The project was completed by General George Washington Goethals on August 15, 1914.

Following Roosevelt, President Taft visited the Panama Canal a few times in 1907, 1909, 1910 and 1912. Taft traveled to the Canal on the US Navy USS Tennessee (ACR-10) and the battleship USS Arkansas (BB-33).

== Naval airfields ==
- Naval Air Station Coco Solo, Atlantic side
- NAS Upham Seaplane Base, Atlantic side
- Coco Solo Field – Coco Walk- France Field, opened in 1917, then France AFB, then Colon Airport in 1949, then 1999 to Enrique Adolfo Jiménez Airport, Atlantic side
- Aguadulce Field, abandoned

== Gallery ==
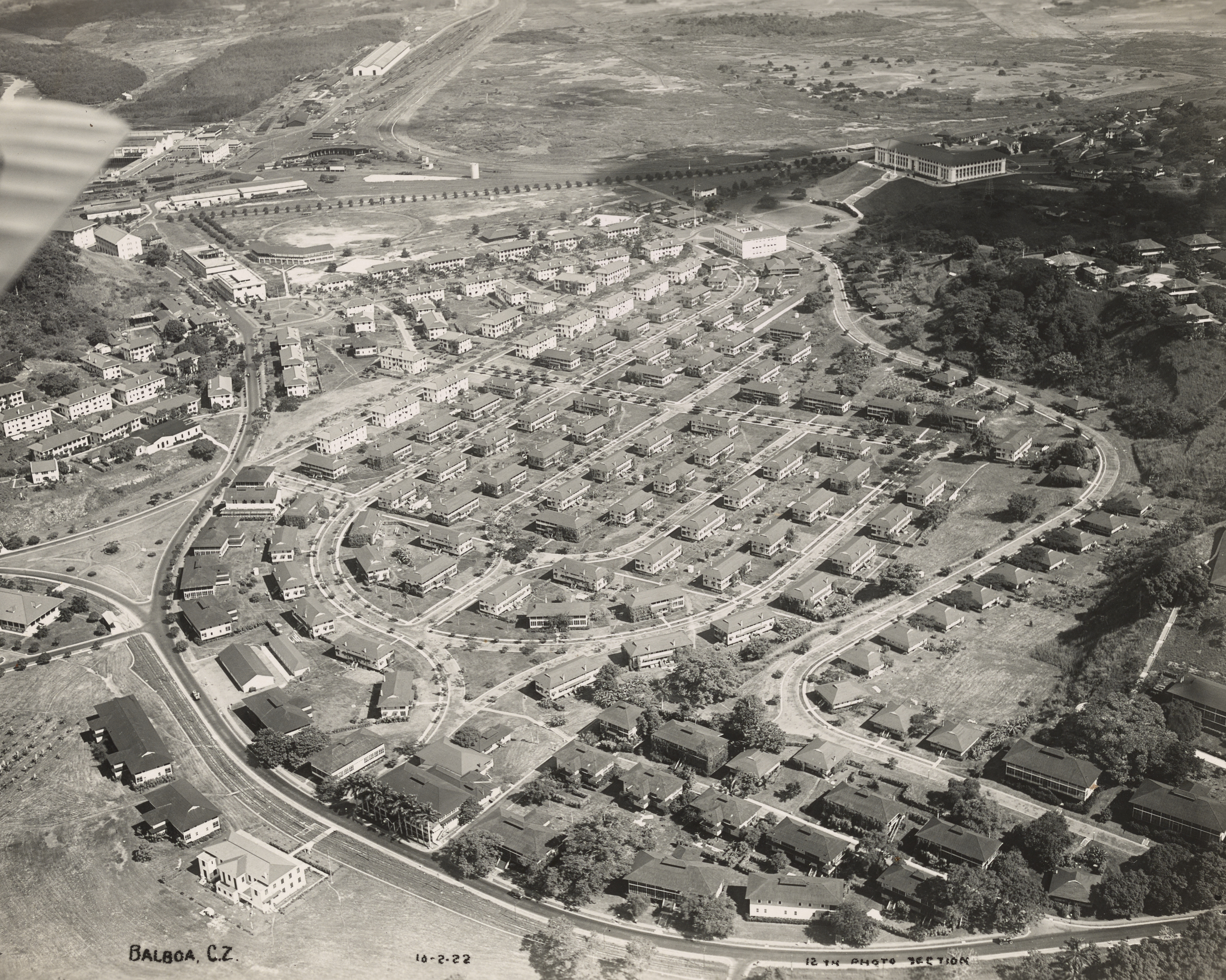
Housing and Panama Canal Zone headquarters on the hill at Baloboa Naval Depot 1941

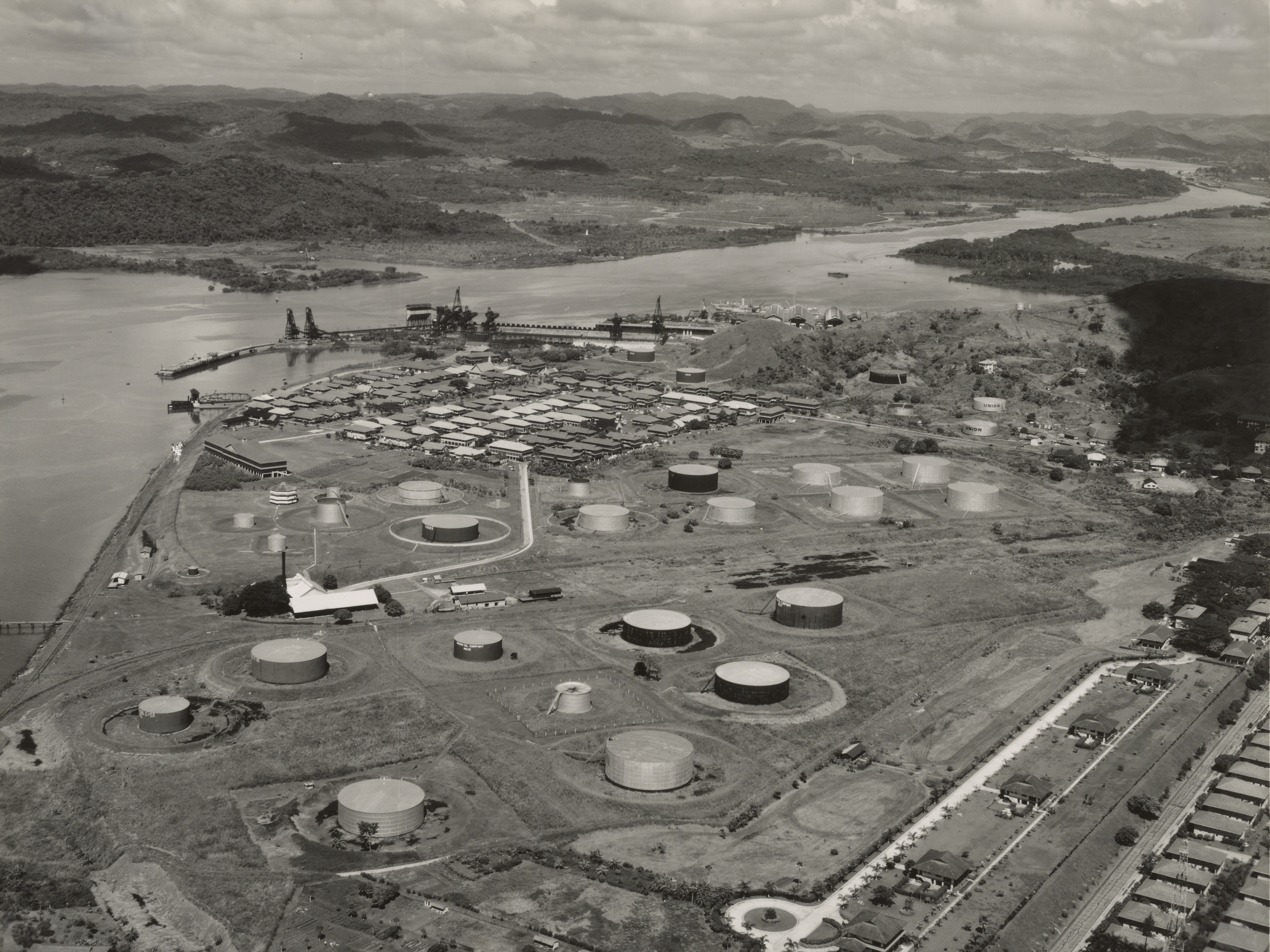
Balboa, Panama oil tanks, Panama Canal Zone 1943

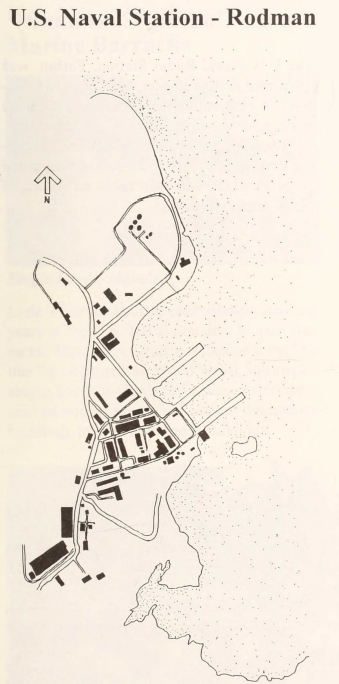
Map of Rodman Naval Station

United States. Bureau of Naval Personnel 72 pages

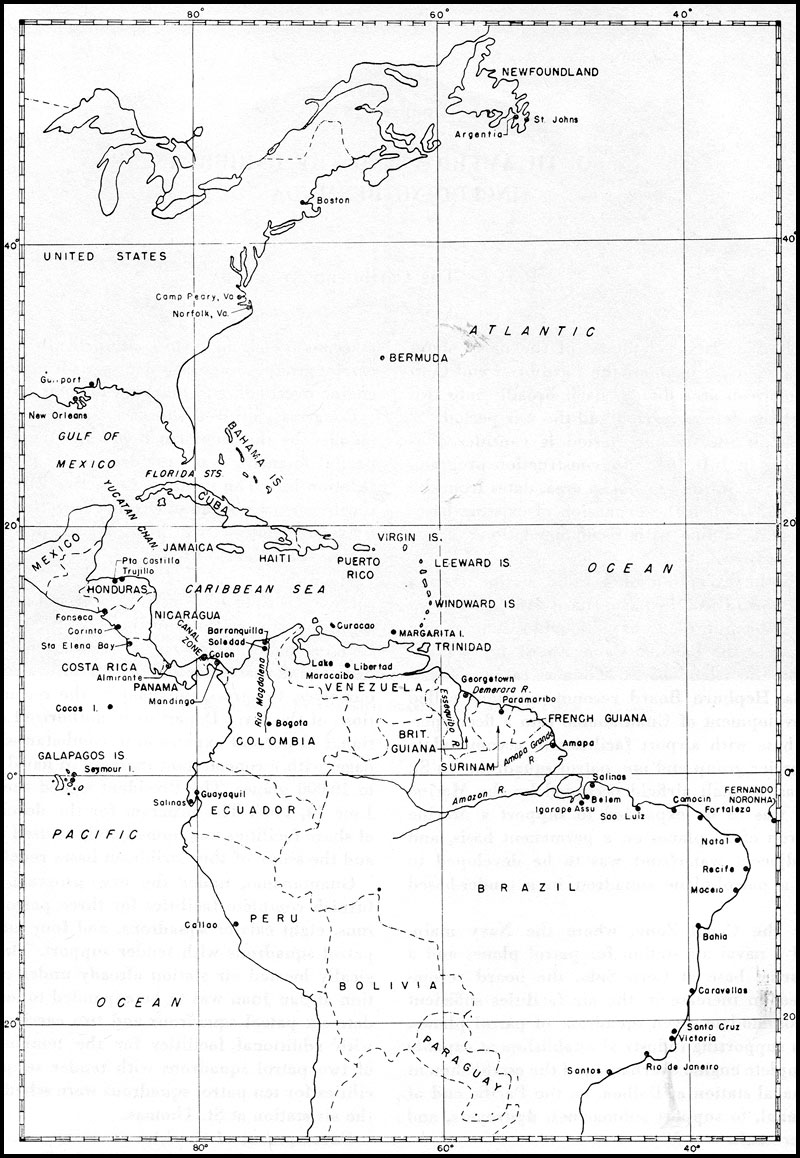
Western Atlantic and Canal Zone Defense Area, US Navy Base map

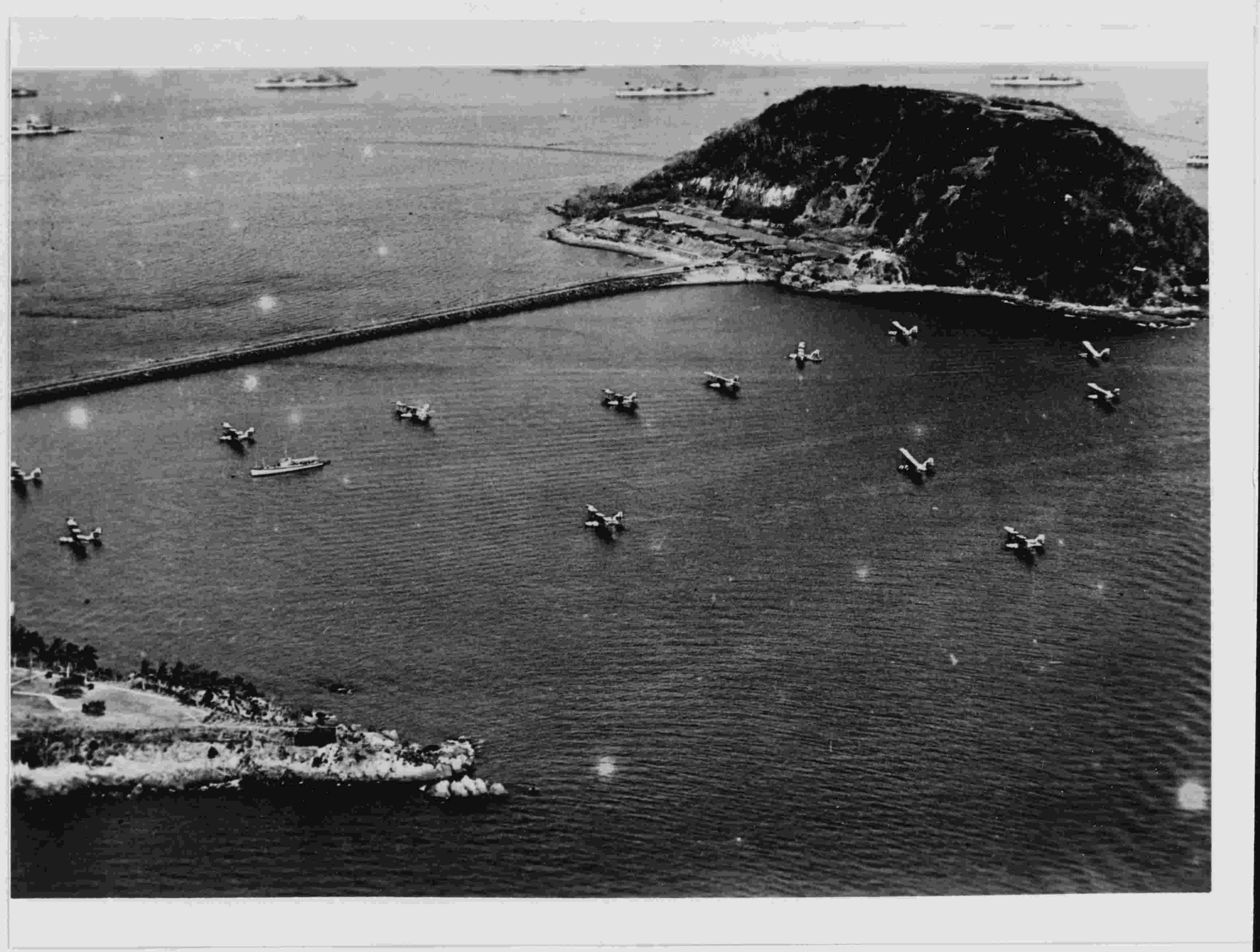
Group of Felixstowe F5L seaplanes moored in Balboa harbor with a submarine chaser at Balboa Naval Depot, Panama Canal Zone in 1923

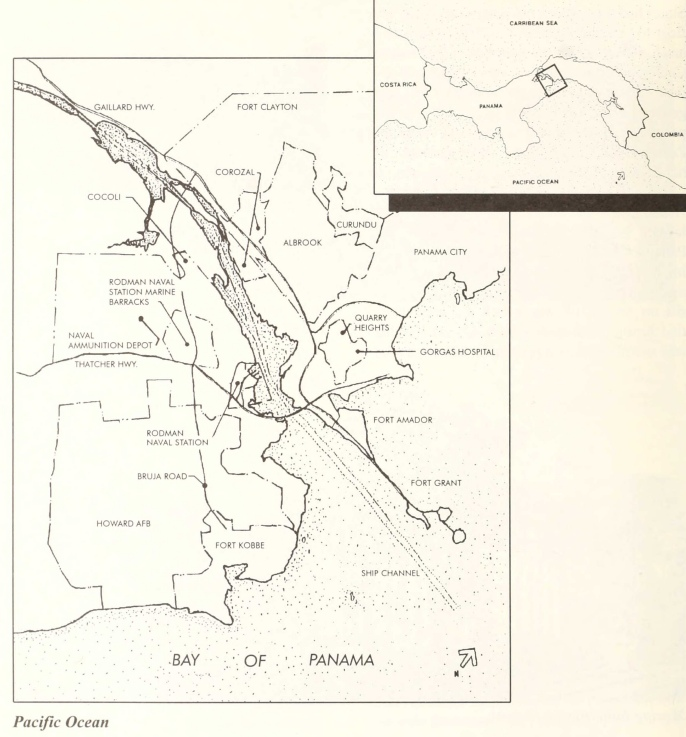
Map of Rodman Naval Station, Port of Balboa and surrounding at Panama Canal Zone

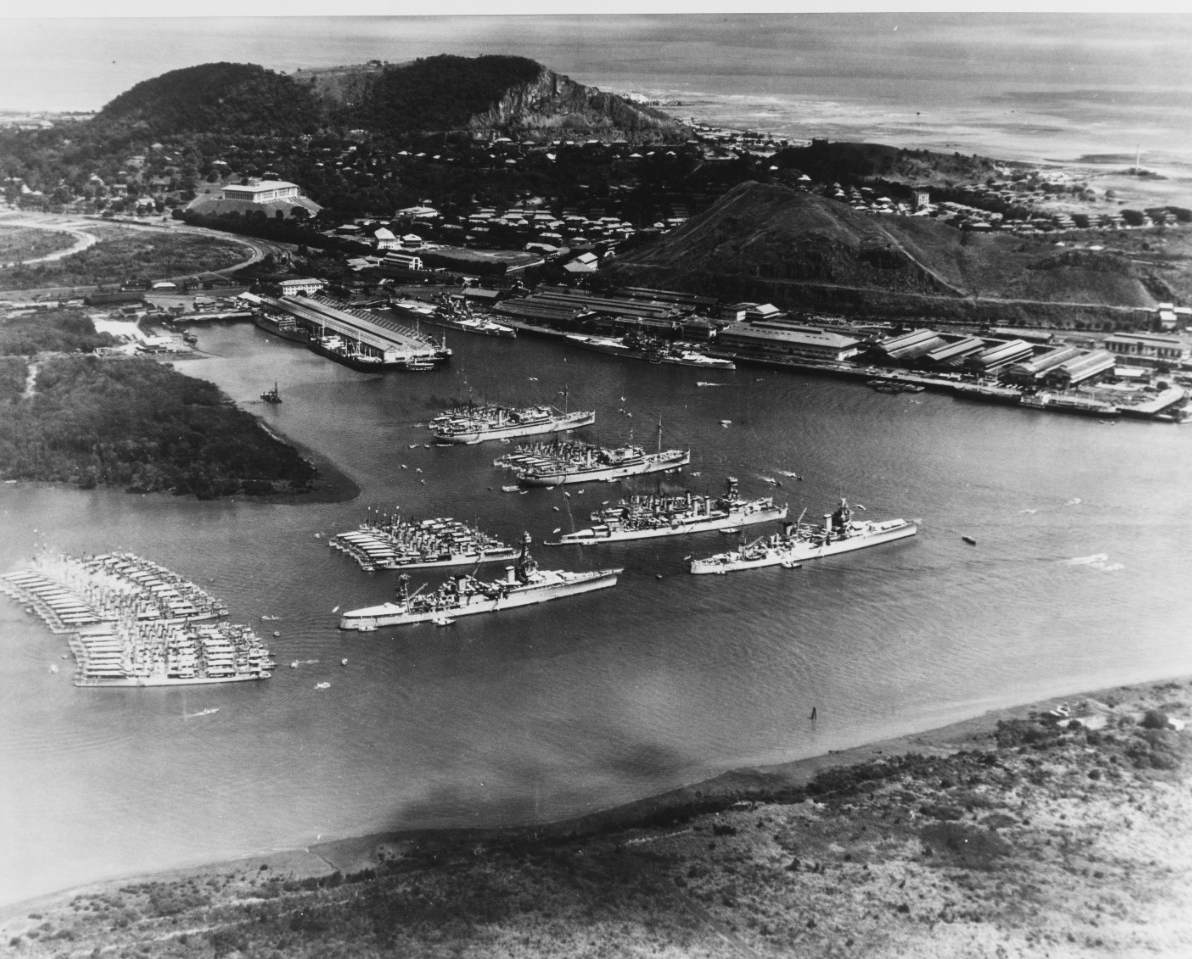
Balboa harbor on 25 October 1934. Fleet moored include two battleships at dock, three cruisers, tenders Whitney and Dobbin, with more than 40 destroyers, noted are McFarland, Goff, and Long

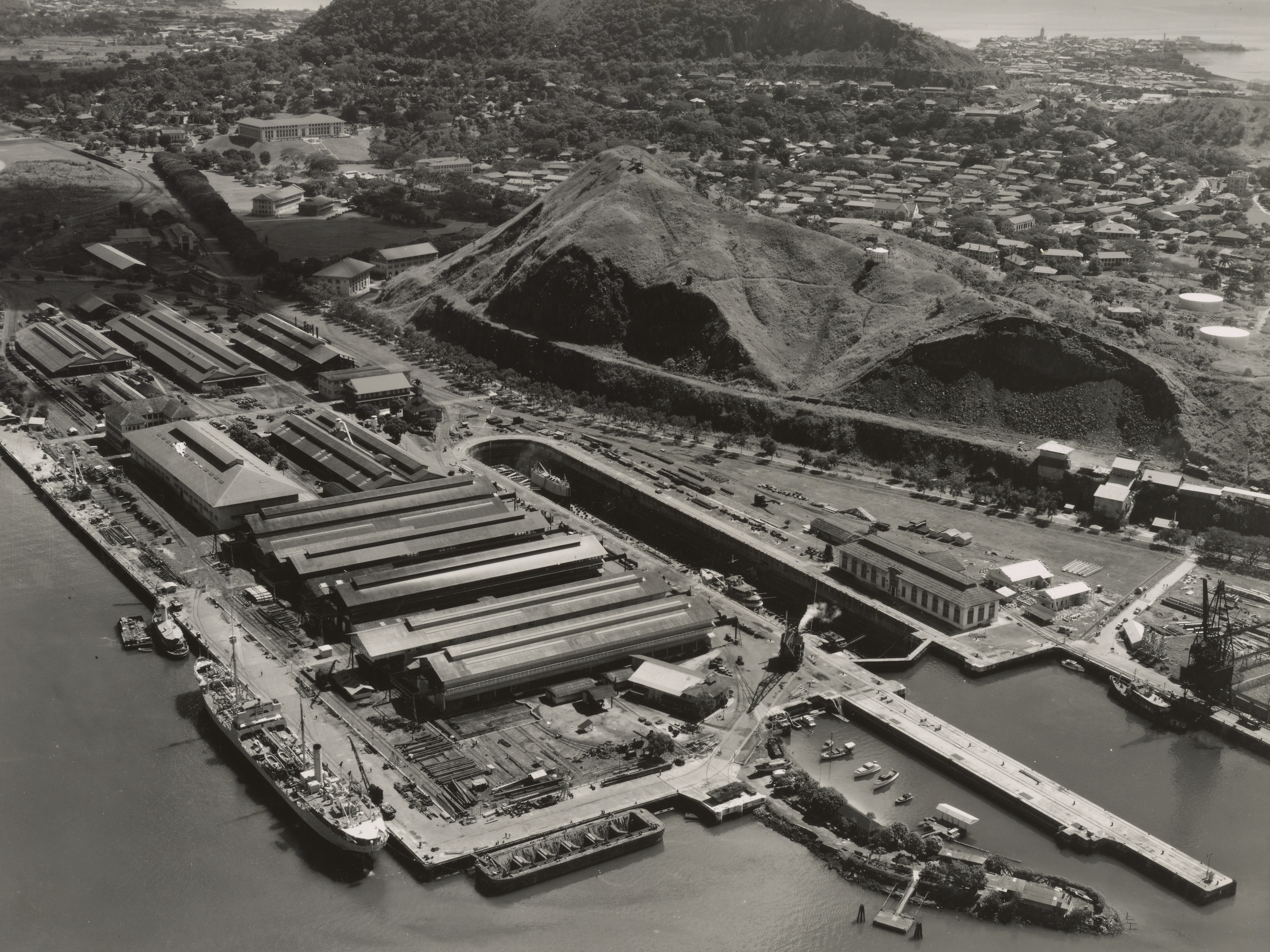
Balboa Dry Docks in Panama Canal Zone 1941

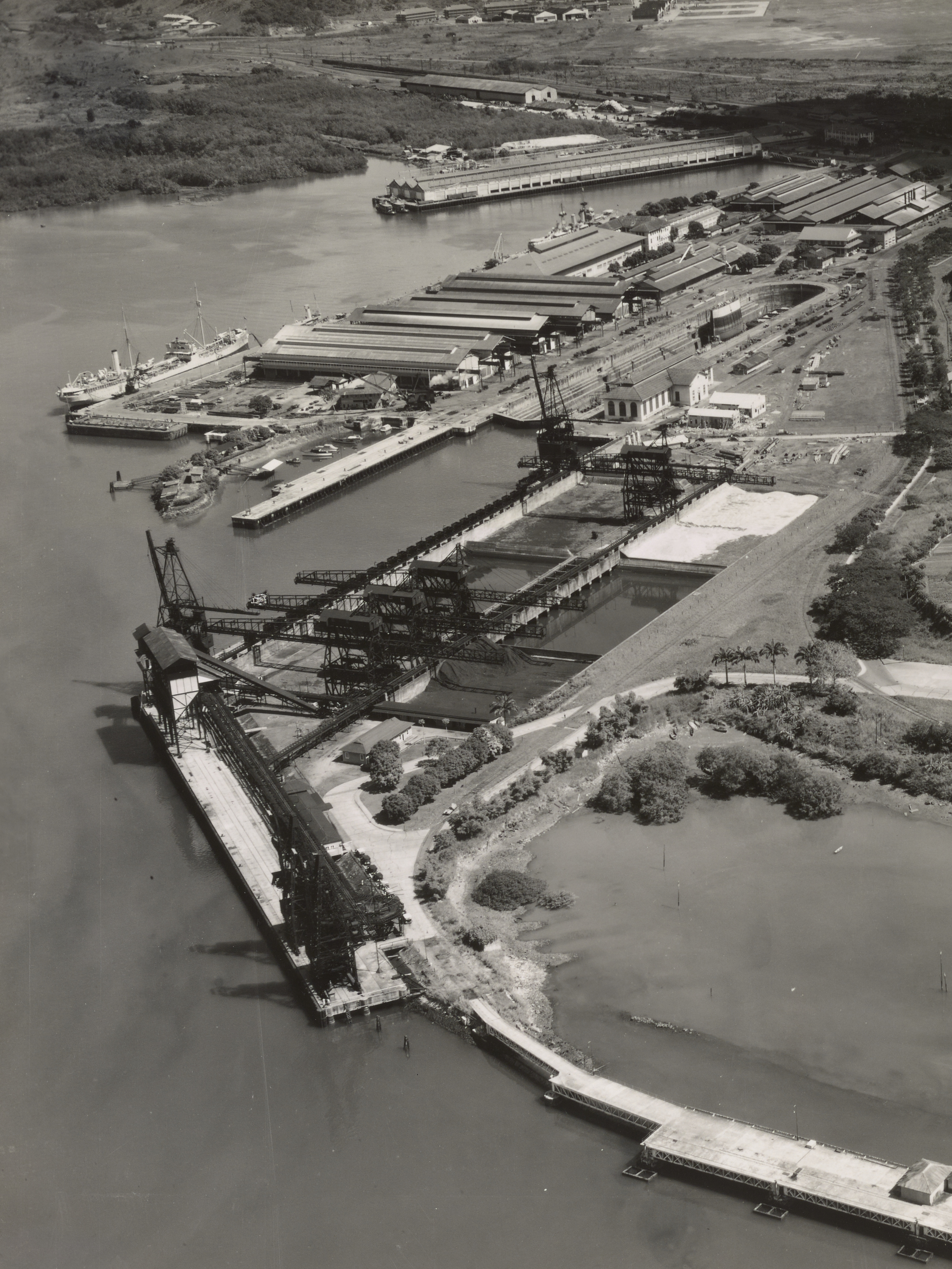
Baloboa Docks, Panama Canal Zone 1941

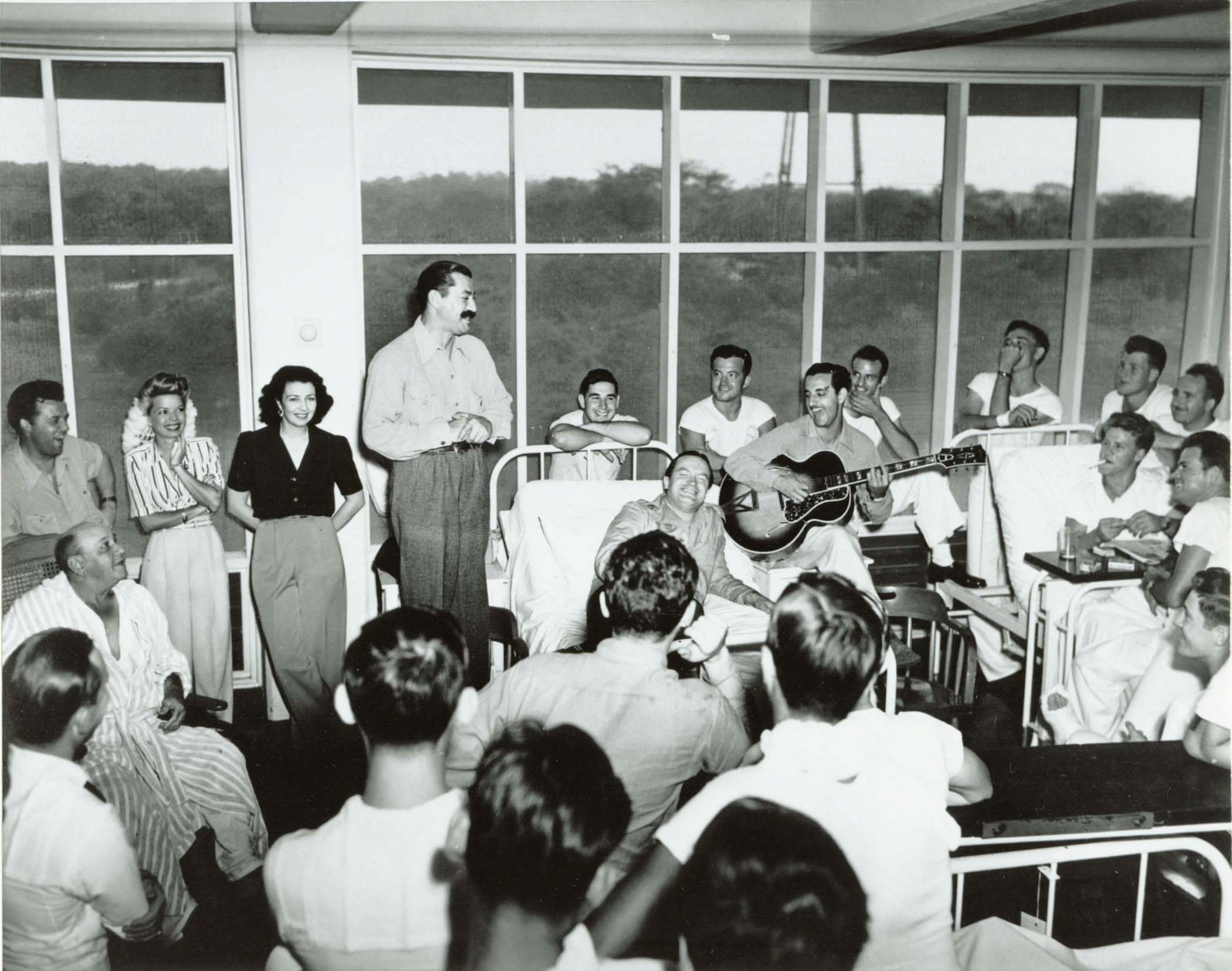
Entertainers Bob Hope and Frances Langford entertaining patients at the Coco Solo Hospital on March 9, 1944. Entertainers present include (left to right): Frances Langford, Vera Vague, Jerry Colonna, Bob Hope, and Tony Romano. Also present is Wendell Niles.

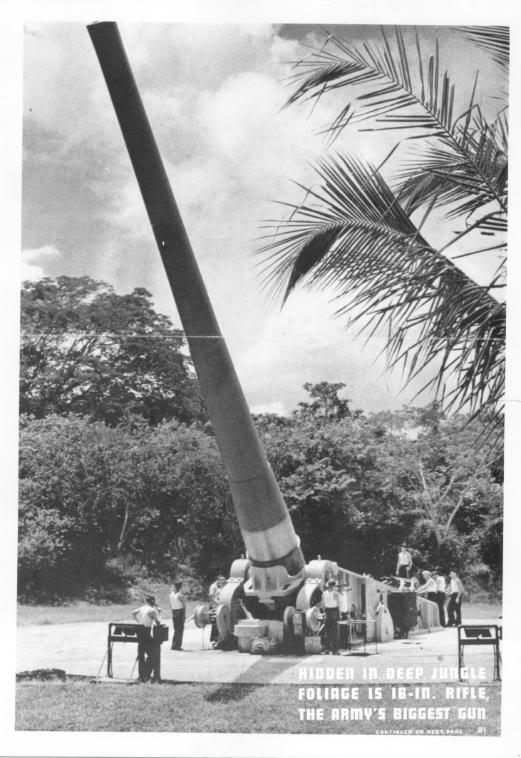
A 16-inch Coastal Defense Gun and crew at Naval Base Panama Canal Zone in 1939.

Panama Canal Zone - Atlantic Ocean, main base Naval Station Coco Solo

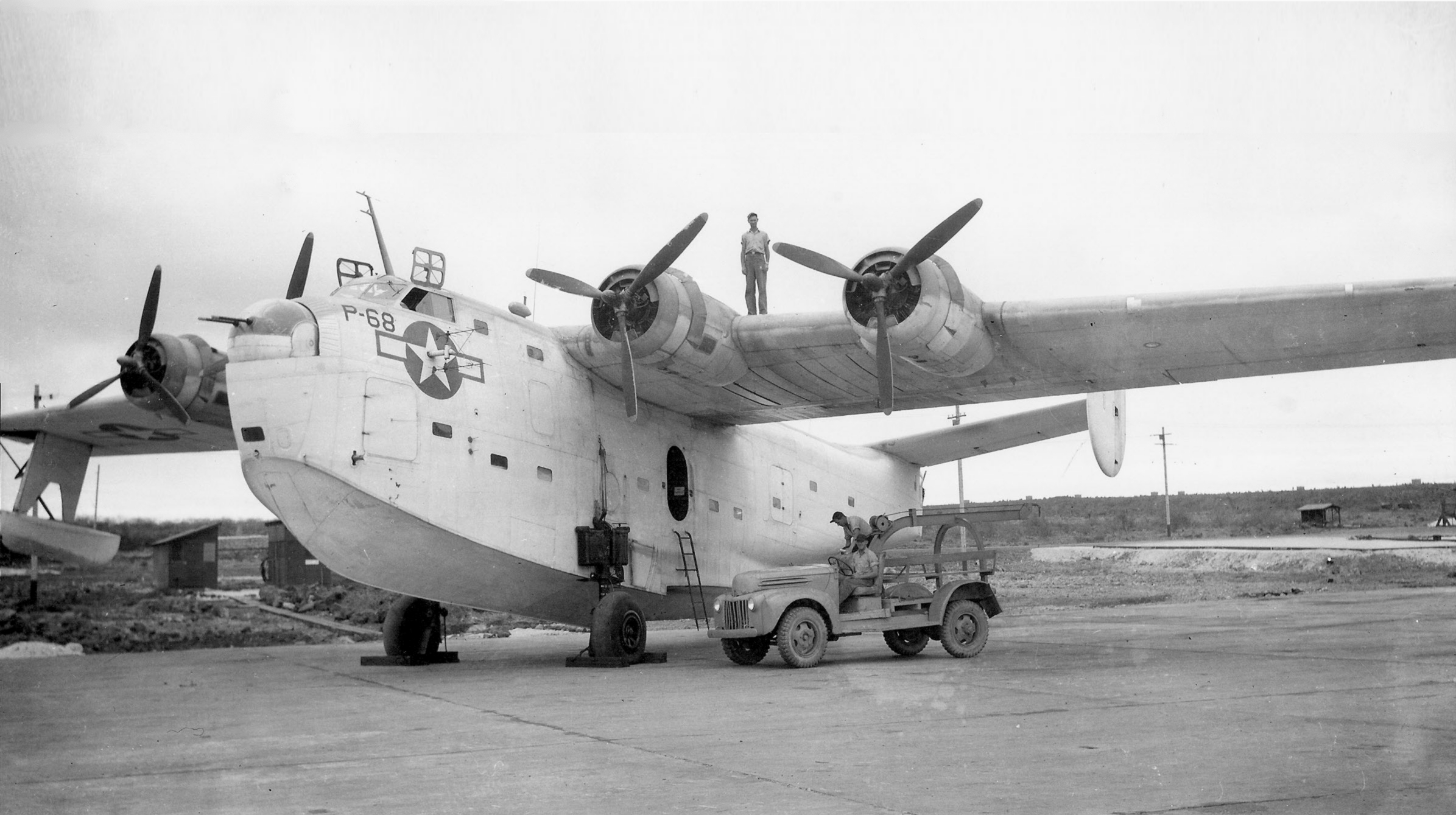
Consolidated PB2Y Coronado seaplane with VP-1

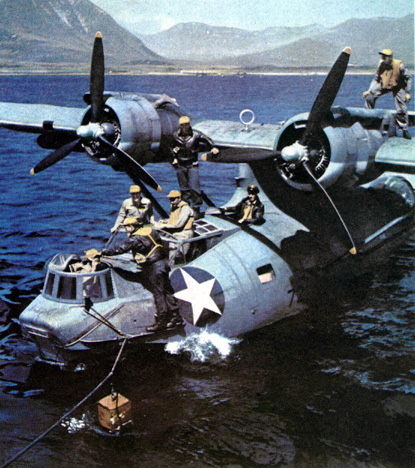
A Consolidated PBY Catalina seaplane crew

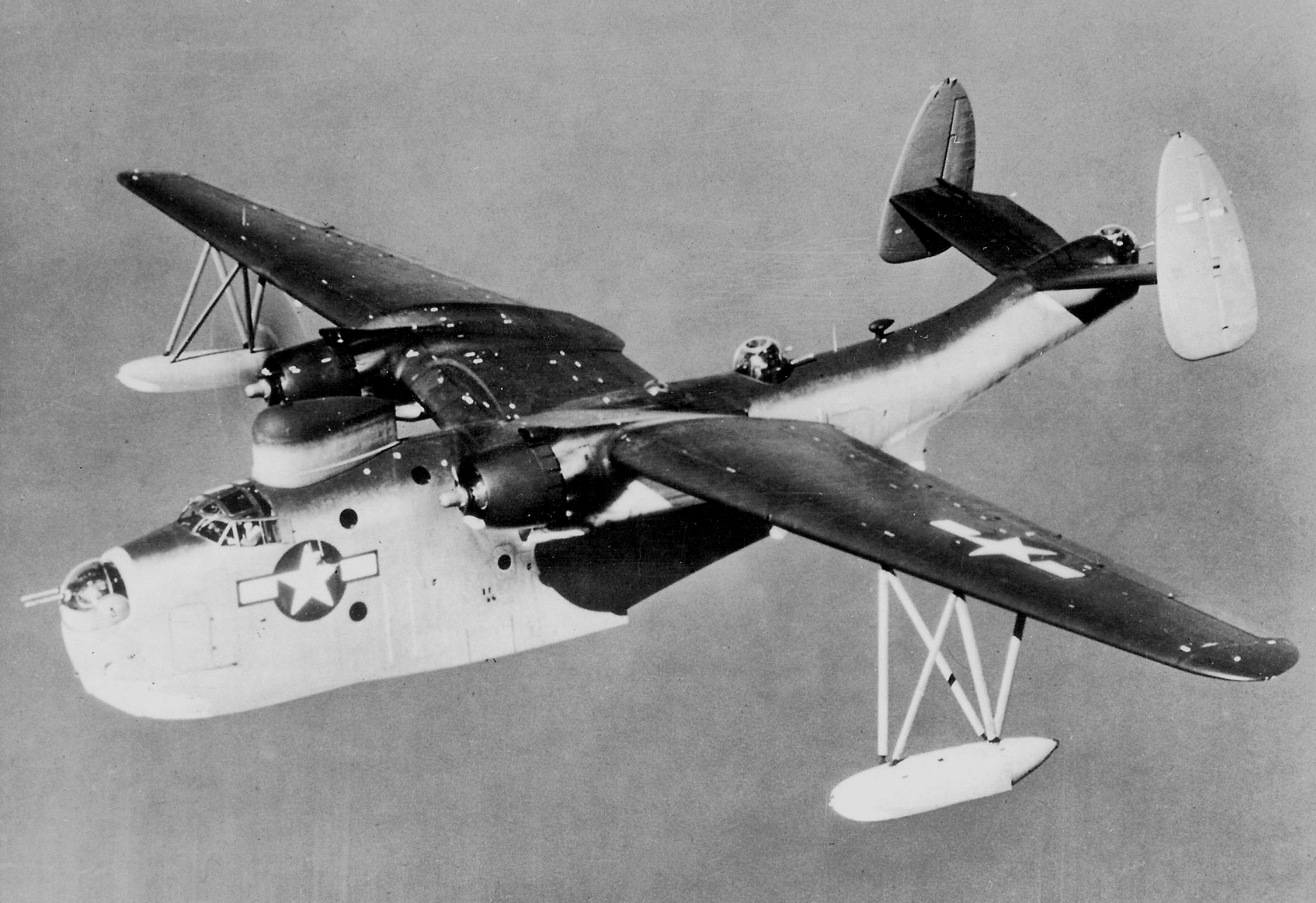
Martin PBM-5 Mariner seaplane in flight

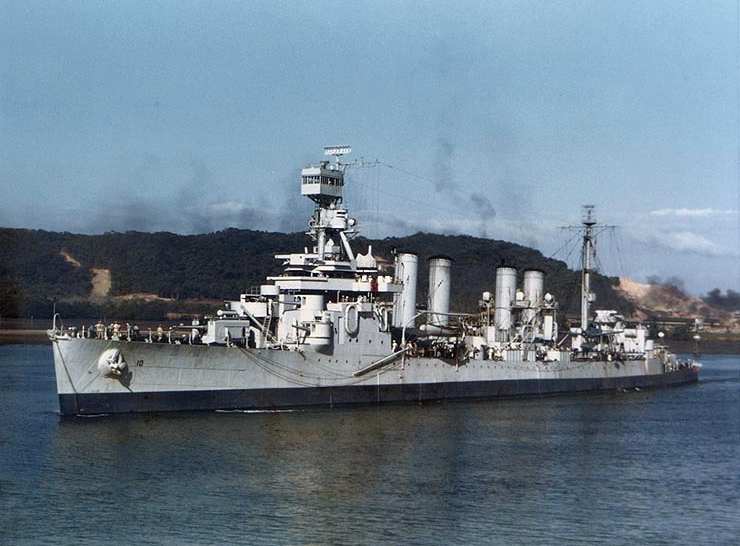
The light cruiser USS Concord off Balboa, Panama, on January 6, 1943

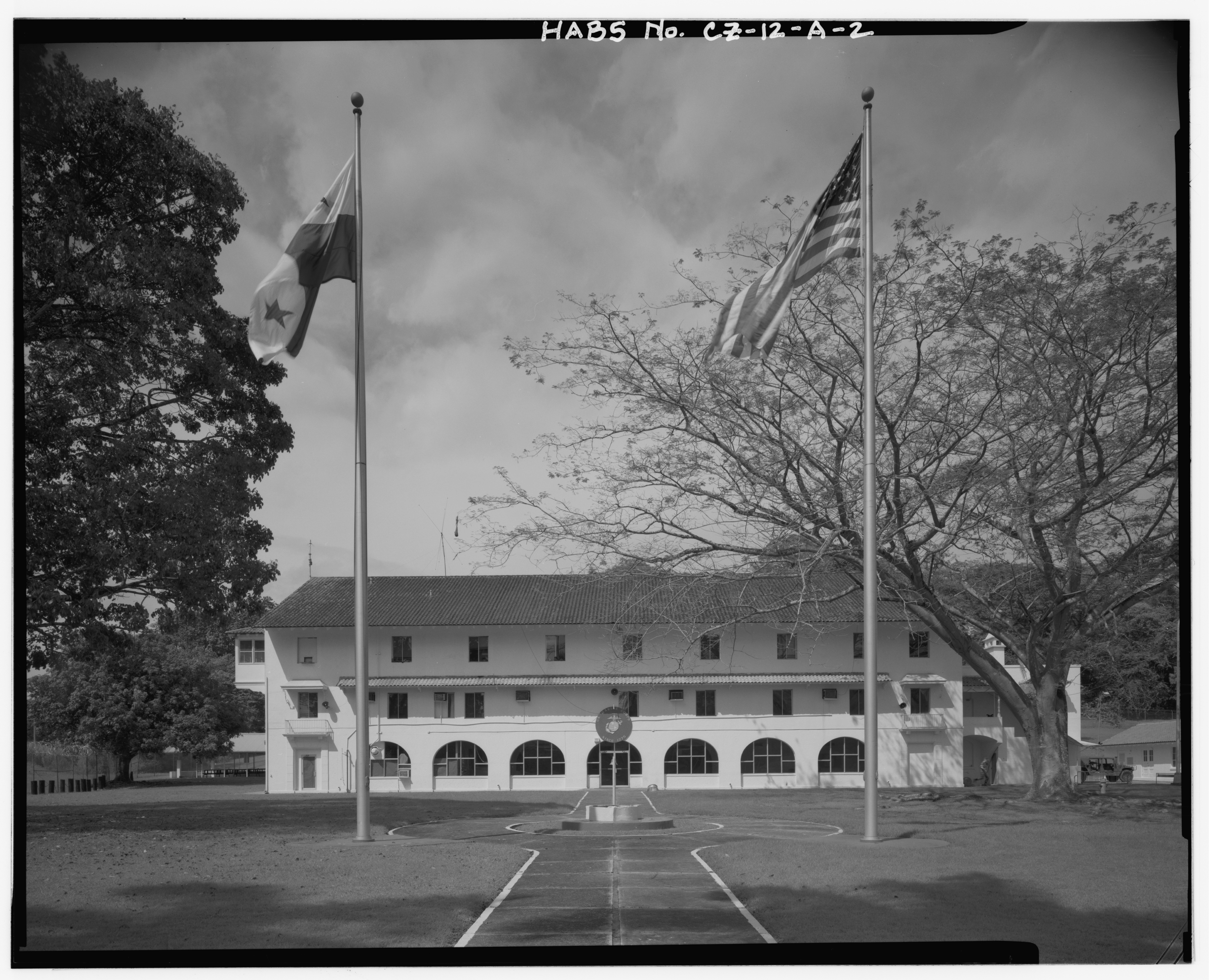
Marine Barracks, Panama Canal Balboa

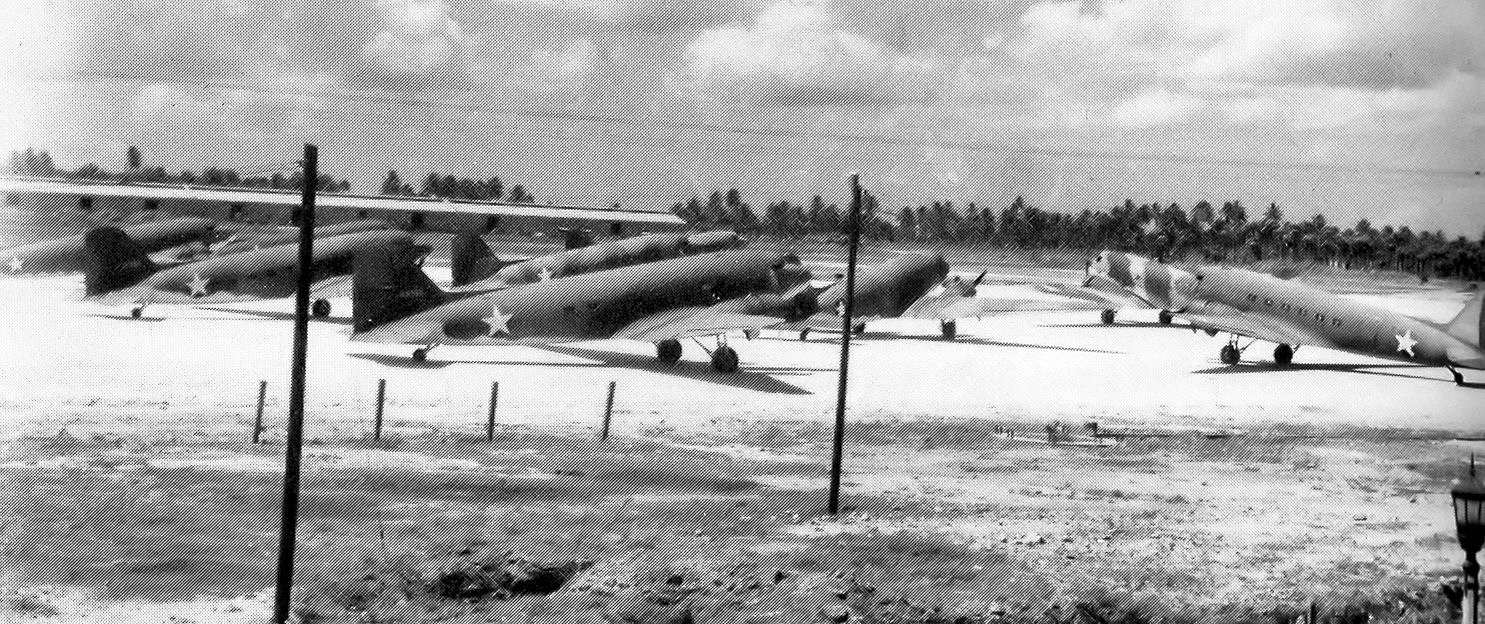
20th Transport Squadron aircraft at Howard Field in 1943

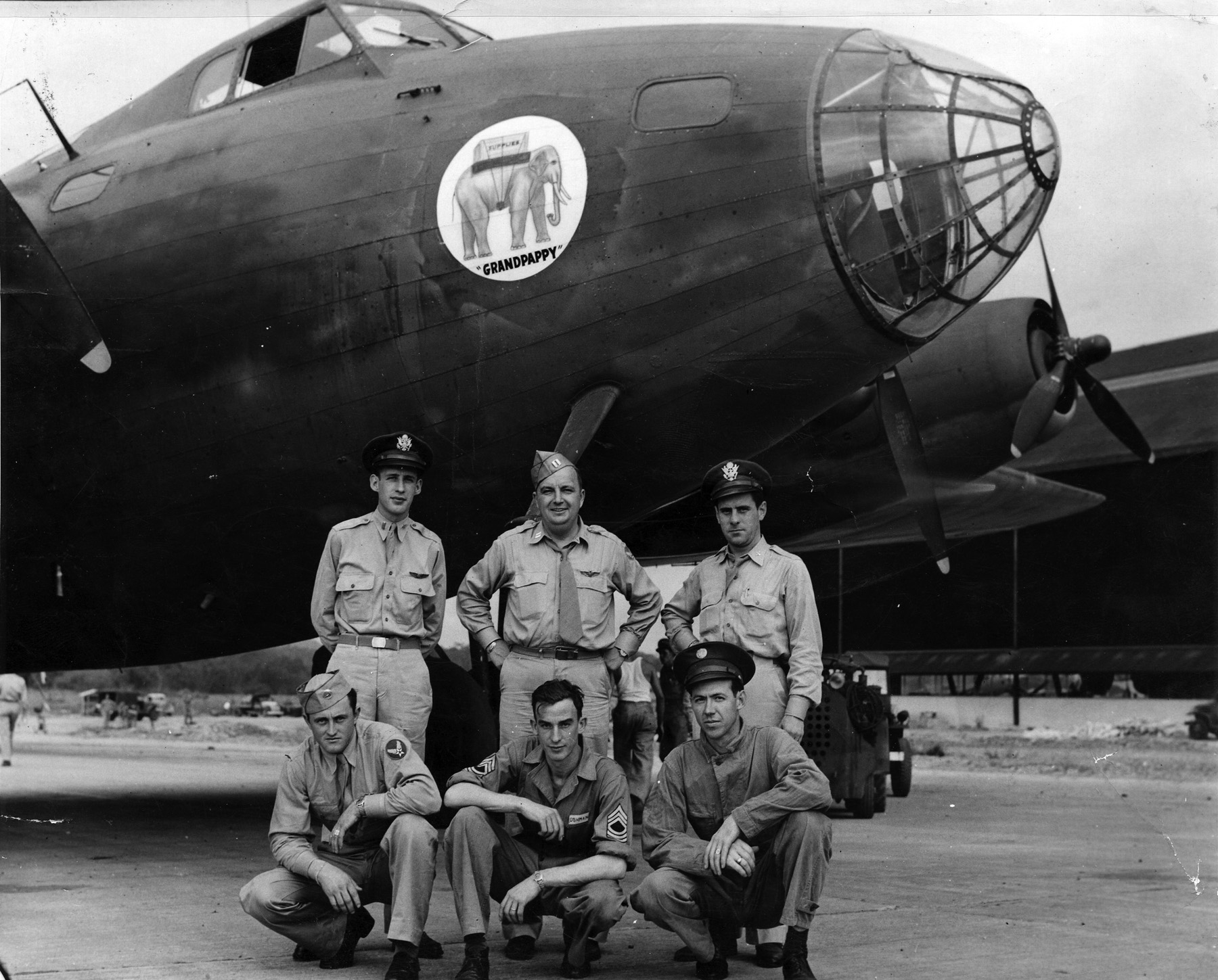
Boeing XC-105 in 1943 at Albrook Field

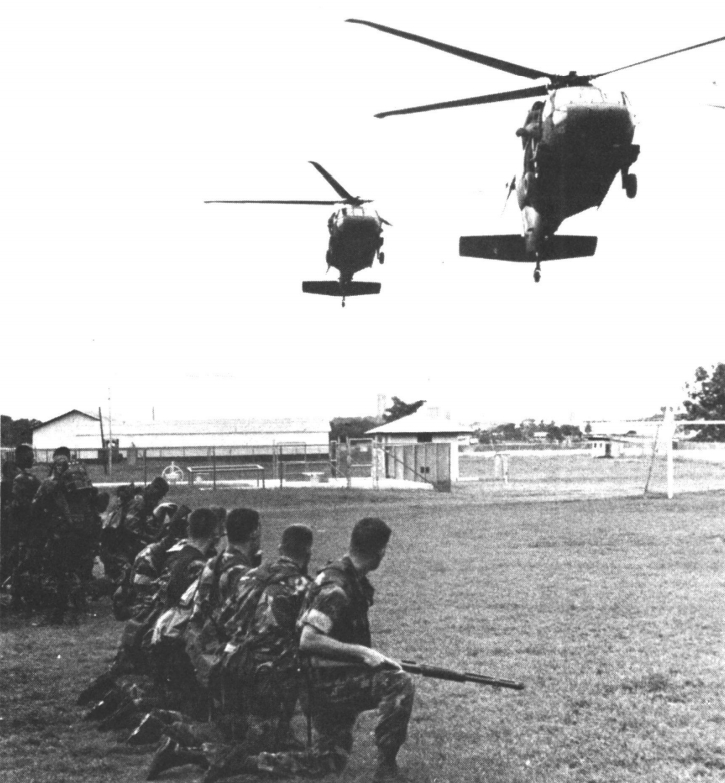
Sikorsky UH-60 Black Hawk at Rodman Naval Station pick up Marine in 1988

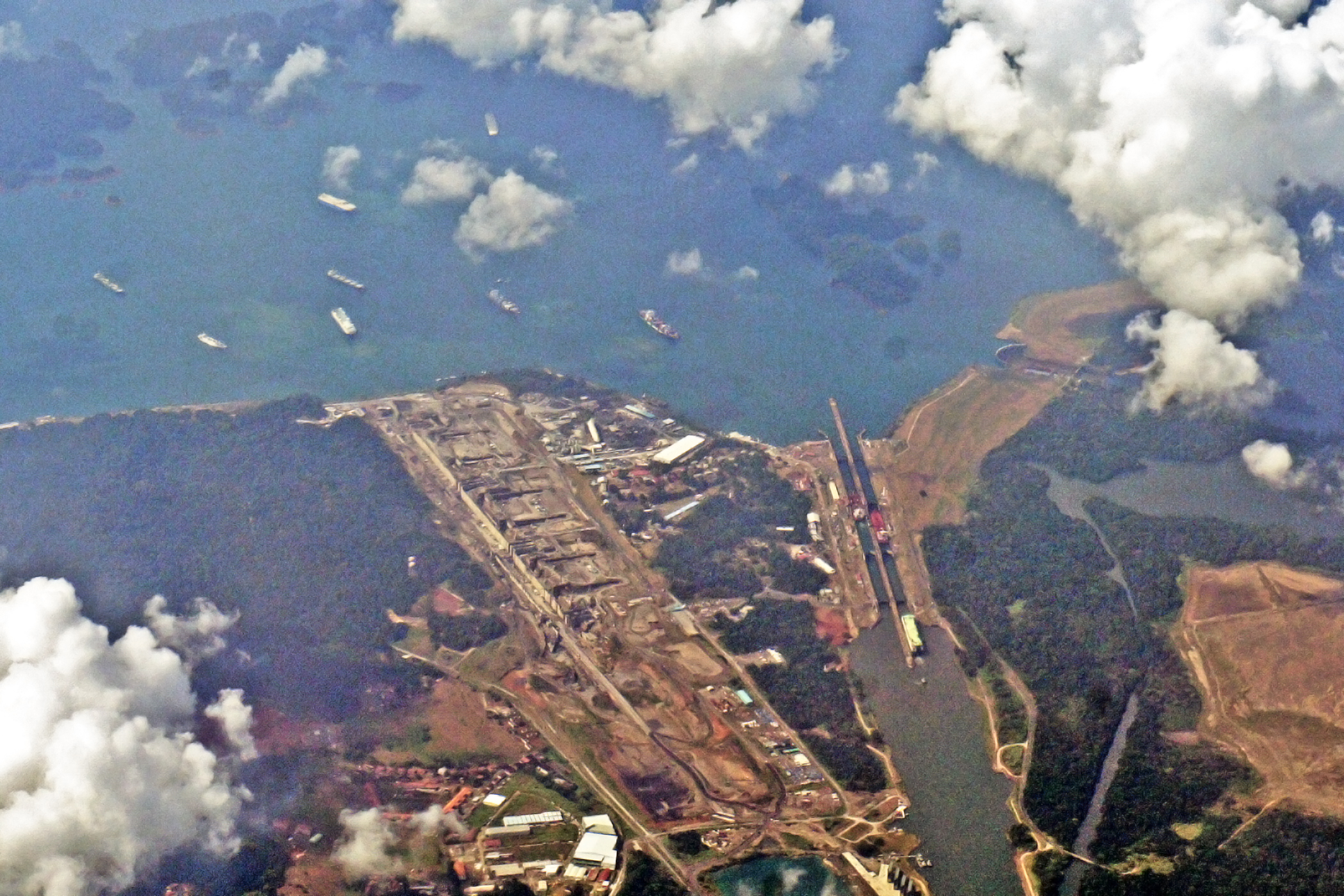
Aerial view of Gatun Locks, Panama Canal. On top, several vessels waiting at Gatun Lake to cross the locks. At the bottom is exit canal to the Atlantic Ocean (Caribbean Sea)

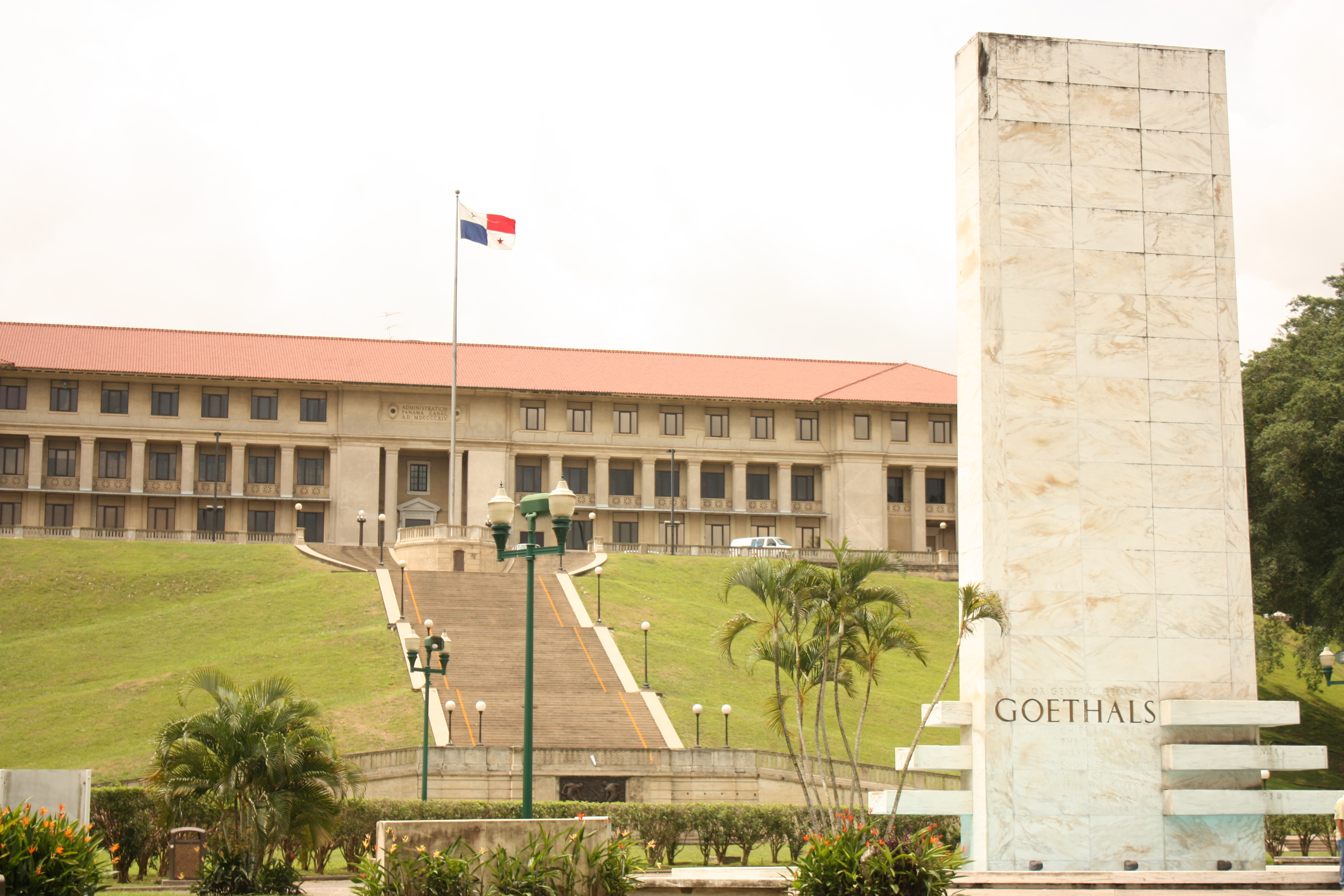
Administration Building and Goethals Monument at Balboa

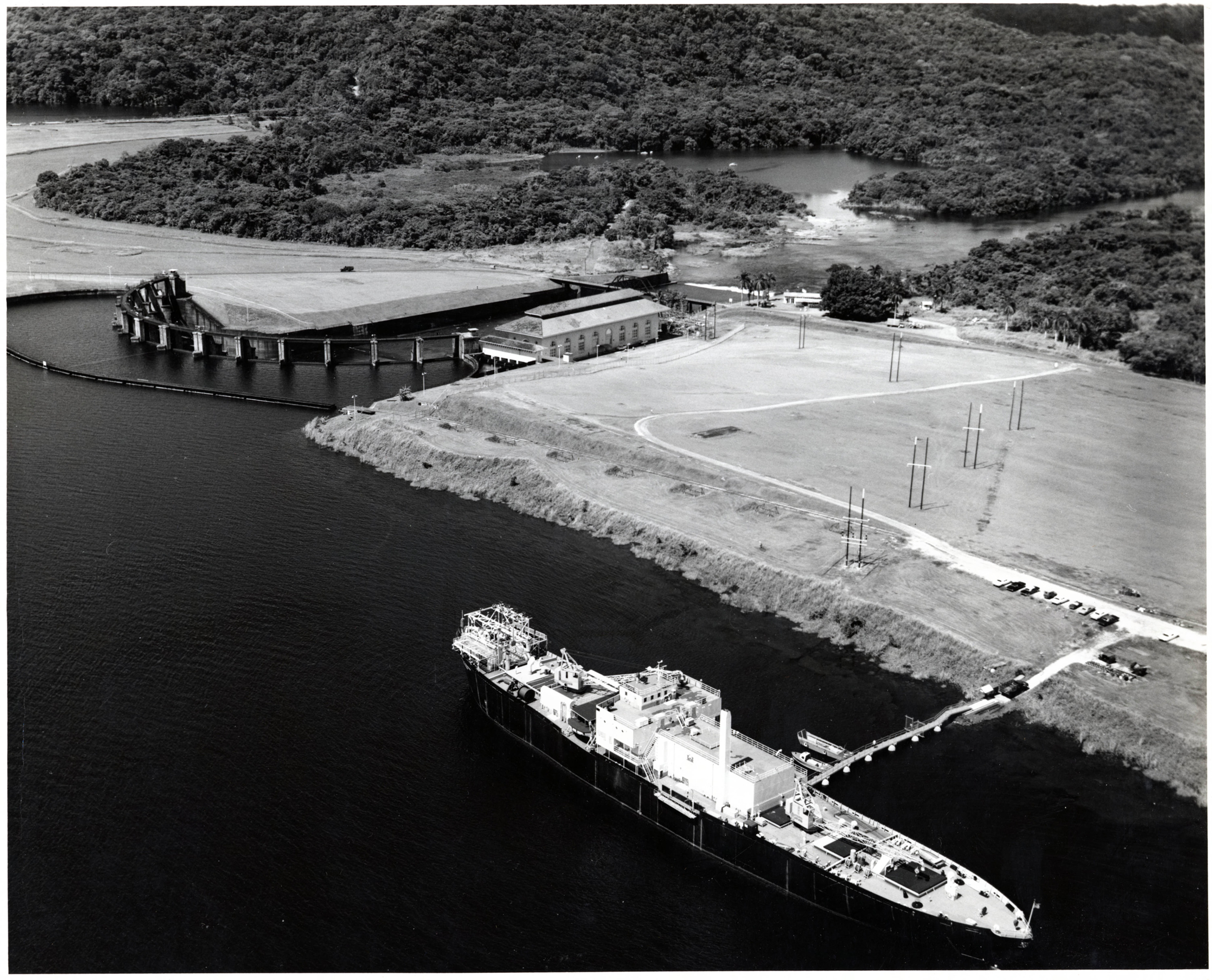
MH-1A (1968–1976), a floating nuclear power station, at the Panama Canal
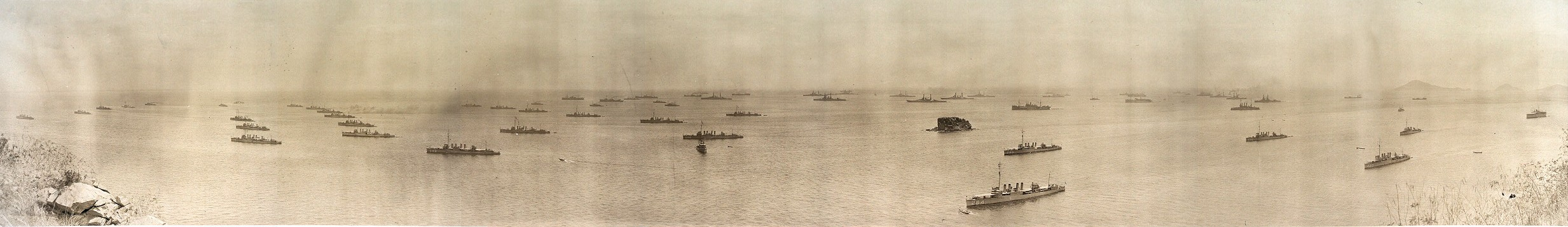
US fleet off the coast of Panama, March 1, 1923

== See also ==
- US Naval Advance Bases
- Panama Railway
- Rail transport in Panama
- Transcontinental Railroad#Panama
- List of former United States military installations in Panama
- Tivoli Hotel, Panama
- Gorgas Hospital
- Panama–Pacific International Exposition
- Ajax crane barge
- Canal Zone
- Corozal American Cemetery and Memorial
- Fleet problem series of naval exercises at the base
