= USS AFDM-3 =

AFDM-3-class dry dock of the United States Navy

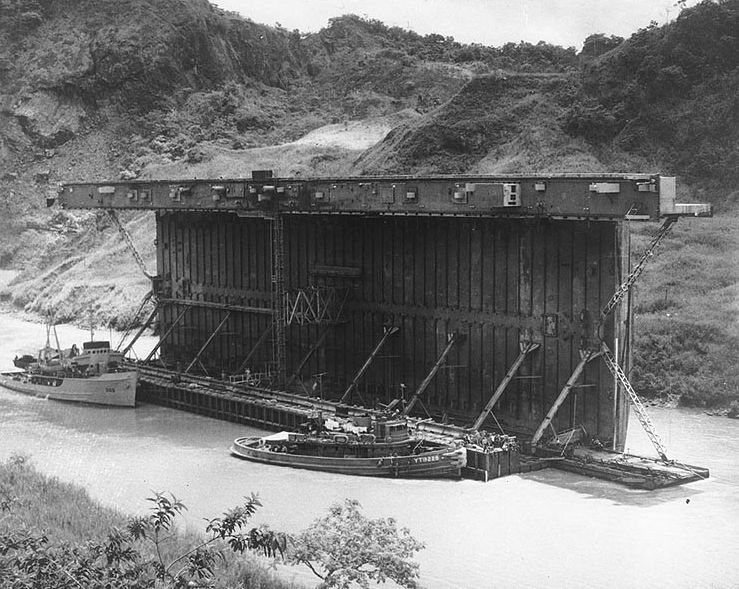
- USS YFD-6

History

United States
- Name: YFD-6
- Builder: Chicago Bridge & Iron Company
- Laid down: January 1943
- Acquired: 1 December 1943
- Commissioned: 9 December 1943
- Reclassified: AFDM-3, 1946
- Stricken: 15 November 2000
- Identification: Callsign: NAHY
- Honors and awards: See Awards
- Fate: Leased to Alabama Shipbuilding, 1999; Sold to Alabama Shipbuilding, 2002

General characteristics
- Class & type: AFDM-3-class floating drydock
- Displacement: 6,800 t (6,693 long tons), light load; 8,000 t (7,874 long tons), full load
- Length: 622 ft 10 in (189.84 m)
- Beam: 124 ft 0 in (37.80 m)
- Draft: 7–15 ft (2.1–4.6 m)
- Complement: 4 officers, 146 enlisted

USS AFDM-3, (former YFD-6), was the lead ship of the AFDM-3-class floating dry dock built in 1943 and operated by the United States Navy.

== Construction and career ==
YFD-6 was built at the Chicago Bridge and Iron Shipyard, in Chicago, Illinois in January 1943. She was commissioned on 9 December 1943.

From 24 to 26 June 1944, USS Larch (YN-16) was dry-docked inside YFD-6. In late December 1944, USS Arikara (AT-98) voyaged to Trinidad where she took YFD-6 in tow before continuing on to the Panama Canal. On 26 June 1945, YFD-6 was prepared transiting the Panama Canal, circa 1945. YFD-6's center section fully turned 90 degrees, floating on its side with the support of a thousand Navy pontoons installed atop the wing wall. This work, done by Navy SeaBees, was necessary to allow the drydock section to fit through the canal's locks. USS YT-355, USS Alarka (YTB-229) and USS Umpqua (ATA-209) guided and towed the dry dock through the canal. In AUgust 1946, the dry dock was re-designated as AFDM-3. USS Gauger (YO-55) towed AFDM-3 and steaming in company with USS Bluebird (ASR-19), USS Cahuilla (ATF-152) and USS Tawakoni (ATF-114), she reached Pearl Harbor on 12 October 1946. In latter 1948, AFDM-3 and USS Sustain (AFDM-7) arrived at the Balboa yard to be prepared to transit the Panama Canal similarly to USS AFDM-1.

Throughout 1950, The US Navy done heavy workload on AFDM-3, USS AFDM-7 and USS AFDM-9.

In 1986, AFDM-3, USS ARD-10 and USS ARD-16 were all laid up in Mobile, Alabama.

In 1999, the dry dock was leased to the Bender Shipbuilding and Repair Company.

The AFDM-6 was struck from the Naval Register on 15 November 2000. On 1 April 2002, it was sold to the company in Mobile.

In 2010, the Bender Shipbuilding Company was declared bankrupt thus all systems were acquired by the Signal International. After 2018, the shipyard was sold to World Marine of Alabama.

== Awards ==
- American Campaign Medal
- Asiatic-Pacific Campaign Medal
- World War II Victory Medal
