= USS Alarka =

Tugboat of the United States Navy

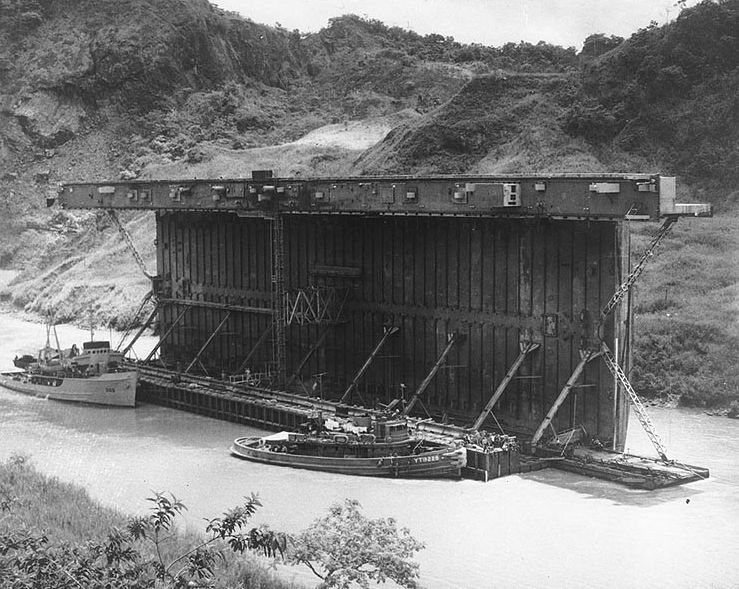
- USS Alarka center and tug USS Umpqua (ATA-209) maneuver floating drydock USS YFD-6 through the Culebra Cut in the Panama Canal, ca. May–June 1945.

History

United States
- Name: USS Alarka
- Namesake: Alarka, a purported Native American word of unknown meaning
- Builder: Greenport Basin and Construction Company, Greenport, New York
- Laid down: 31 August 1944
- Launched: 20 January 1945
- Sponsored by: Mrs. Horace W. Watts
- Acquired: 5 April 1945
- Commissioned: 6 April 1945
- Decommissioned: Late 1946
- Stricken: 28 January 1947
- Fate: Sold 23 December 1946

General characteristics
- Class & type: Cahto-class large harbor tug
- Displacement: 400 tons
- Length: 110 ft 0 in (33.53 m)
- Beam: 27 ft 0 in (8.23 m)
- Draft: 11 ft 4 in (3.45 m)
- Speed: 12 knots
- Complement: 20
- Armament: 2 x .50-caliber (12.7-millimeter) machine guns

USS Alarka (YTB-229), was a United States Navy tug in commission from 1945 to 1946.

Alarka was laid down on 31 August 1944 by the Greenport Basin and Construction Company at Greenport, Long Island, New York, and was launched on 20 January 1945, sponsored by Mrs. Horace W. Watts, the head of the William and Watts firm which performed electrical work under subcontract during the construction of Alarka. Delivered to the U.S. Navy on 5 April 1945, Alarka was commissioned on 6 April 1945.

Early in May 1945, Alarka departed New York City and proceeded, via the Panama Canal and Pearl Harbor, Hawaii to the western Pacific Ocean. She arrived in Buckner Bay, Okinawa, late in August or early in September 1945. She served there and later at Sasebo, Japan, where she was placed out of service sometime late in 1946.

On 23 December 1946, Alarka was sold to the Chinese Supply Commission. Her name was struck from the Navy List on 28 January 1947.
