= USS Oak Ridge =

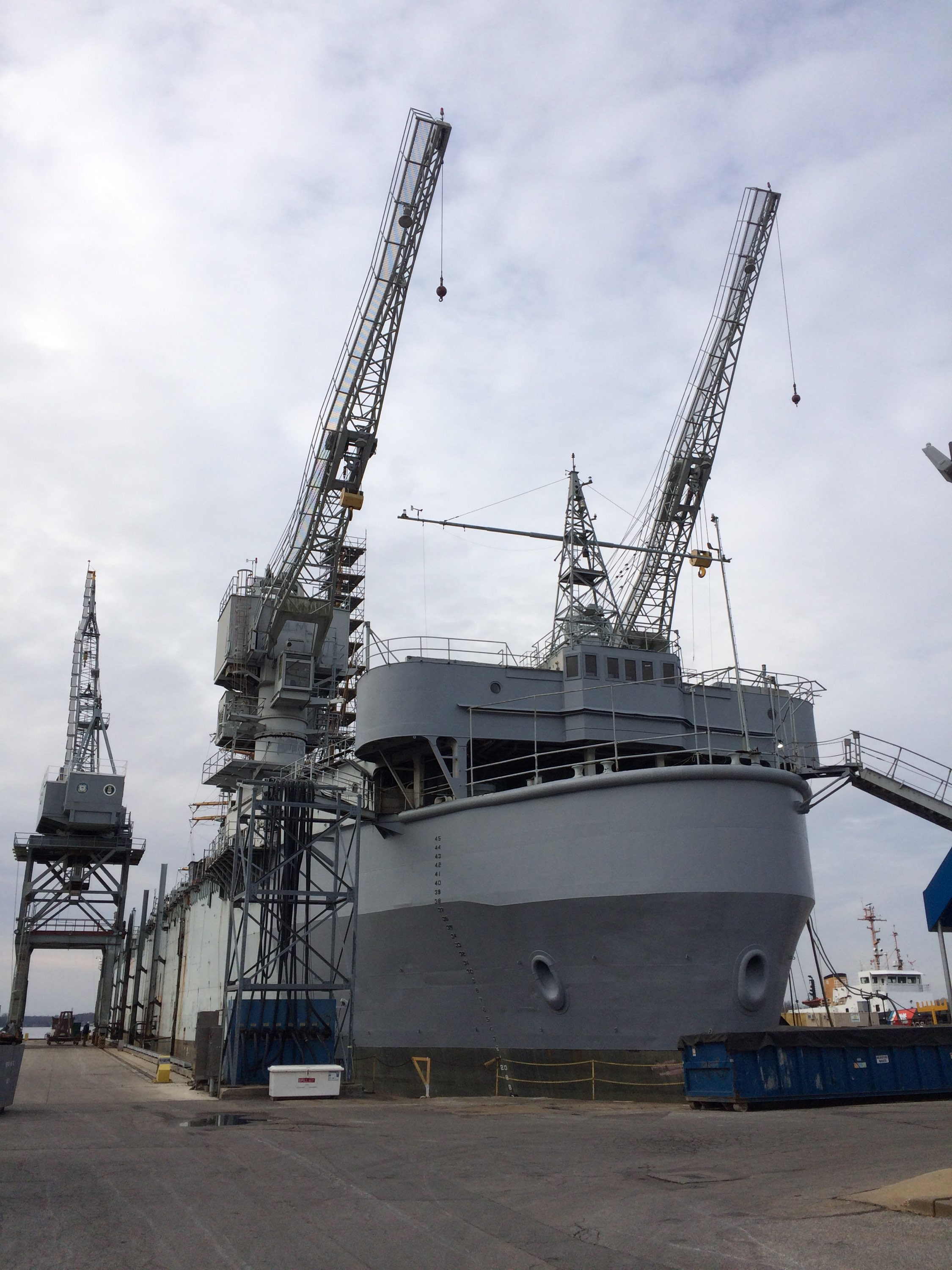
- Oak Ridge at Coast Guard Yard, Baltimore, Maryland

History

United States
- Name: USS ARD-19
- Builder: Pacific Bridge Company; Alameda, California
- Laid down: 1943
- Commissioned: 22 March 1944
- Decommissioned: 30 September 1949
- Recommissioned: 1 October 1963
- Renamed: USS Oak Ridge
- Reclassified: ARDM-1
- Namesake: Oak Ridge National Laboratory
- Decommissioned: 10 August 2001
- Stricken: 26 November 2001
- Fate: Transferred to the United States Coast Guard, 8 February 2002

History

United States
- Acquired: 8 February 2002
- Home port: United States Coast Guard Yard; Curtis Bay, Baltimore, Maryland; 39.1970°N 76.5707°W

General characteristics (as built)
- Class & type: ARD-12-class floating dry dock
- Displacement: 6,800 tons
- Length: 491 ft 8 in (149.86 m)
- Beam: 81 ft (24.7 m)
- Propulsion: None
- Armament: 2 × 40 mm AA guns; 2 × 20 mm AA guns

General characteristics (as refit 1963)
- Class & type: ARDM-1-class
- Displacement: 7,390 long tons
- Length: 536 ft 1 in (163.40 m)
- Draft: 33 ft 3 in (10.13 m)

USS Oak Ridge (ARD-19/ARDM-1) was originally a United States Navy Auxiliary floating drydock suitable for dry docking destroyers, submarines and landing craft, built by the Pacific Bridge Company. In the early 1960s she was upgraded to support Los Angeles-class submarines, and re-classified as ARDM-1-class. A stern door and enclosed bow design allows for open ocean transits. The dock is non-propelled and therefore must be taken under tow to operational areas of the fleet. A steering mechanism with twin rudders is installed to facilitate this operation. Sufficient electrical power was provided by four diesel-driven generator sets to maintain all normal and operational requirements. Living, berthing, and mess facilities are provided for the dock's complement of 5 officers, 10 CPO's and a crew of 186.

Oak Ridge was towed, in stages across the Pacific. While in transit she was used as a van to help move the service squadron forward and at the end of August 1944 arrived at Seeadler Harbor carrying a YTL, 2 pontoon crane barges, and 20 LCMs and LCVPs. From Manus ServRon 10 provided the logistic support for the Palau offensive, then moved itself forward to Naval Base Ulithi and Naval Base Kossol Roads. The Leyte landings soon followed and the repair facilities were moved up to San Pedro Bay.

On 27 November 1944 ARD-19 was moored in that bay with USS Ross (DD-563) in dock undergoing repairs. Shortly before noon the Japanese launched an air attack. A "Tojo" fighter crashed into the drydock, passed through the starboard wingwall of the dock, and caused gasoline fed flames to encompass the dock basin deck, searing Ross as they spread. As the fire was being contained another Japanese fighter commenced a strafing run, but was splashed by gunfire from the ARD, Ross, and LST-556. Heavy damage kept the ARD busy on self-repairs for only a brief time. She soon resumed her drydocking and repair role, and continued that service, at Subic Bay, Luzon, until after the end of World War II.

In 1948, ARD-19 was towed back across the Pacific and on 29 October she reported for duty with the Pacific Reserve Fleet at Long Beach. For the next six months she operated under that command and ServRon 1, carrying district craft to various berthing areas on the west coast. In March 1949 she carried YFN–599 to Puget Sound, took on cranes and got underway, in tow, for the Panama Canal Zone. From the Canal Zone she continued on to Orange, Texas, with more district craft in her dock basin. Arriving 10 June, she continued her ferry service until decommissioned and assigned to the Texas Group, Atlantic Reserve Fleet for berthing, 30 September 1949.

Thirteen years later, September 1962, ARD-19 was brought out of reserve and taken to Jacksonville, Florida, where she was converted by the Gibbs Shipyards to support forward deployed Fleet Ballistic Missile (FBM) submarines. Her length increased to 536'1" and a maximum ballasted displacement to 9,700 tons, she became the first mobile single unit capable of such docking. She was then named, redesignated, and recommissioned as Oak Ridge (ARDM-1), 1 October 1963. Further changes, such as the replacement of two 10-ton cranes with two 25-ton cranes, kept her at Norfolk until 4 June 1964 when she was taken under tow by USS Atakapa (ATF-149) to begin the long journey to her homeport of Rota, Spain. With USS Mahoa (YTM-519) in her dock basin, she arrived at Rota 22 days later and commenced providing the services, to Polaris-equipped submarines and others as required attached to SUBRON 16 until June 1979.

Her last station in the Navy was at Naval Submarine Base New London, Connecticut. Oak Ridge was decommissioned on 10 August 2001, stricken from the Naval register on 26 November 2001, and transferred to the United States Coast Guard on 8 February 2002; categorized as a moveable piece of docking equipment and recorded as General Purpose Property. From March 2011 to November 2013, Oak Ridge underwent an extensive Service Life Extension Project (SLEP), which included replacement of more than 2,000 square feet of steel plating and 3,200 linear feet of longitudinal stiffeners, in addition to installation of a new firemain system, new transit-ways for shore services, upgraded remote valve and pump controls to the ballast system, internal emergency dewatering equipment, interior communications, closed circuit TV system and structural improvements to the stern door.

As of 8 August 2018, after a long service history. Oak Ridge was being offered for sale to the highest bidder by the General Services Administration. It was purchased for $1.396 million by East Coast Repair and Fabrication, a ship repair facility in Norfolk, Virginia.

== List of ARDM-1 class ships ==
Ship name	Hull no.	Status	Note
USS Oak Ridge	ARDM-1	disposed	
USS Alamogordo	ARDM-2	disposed	
USS Endurance	ARDM-3	disposed	
Shippingport	ARDM-4	active in service	
Arco	ARDM-5	active in service	

== Gallery ==
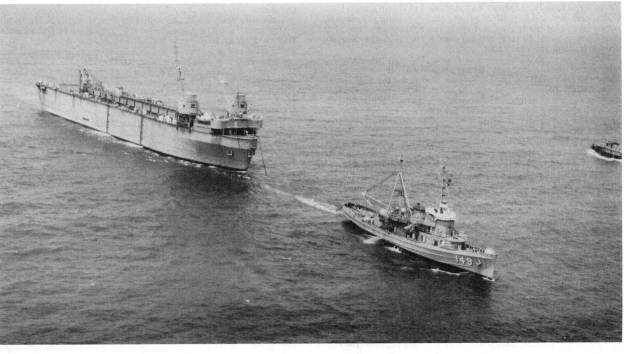
USS Oak Ridge (ARDM-1) under tow by USS Atakapa (ATF-149) arriving in Rota, Spain on 26 June 1964

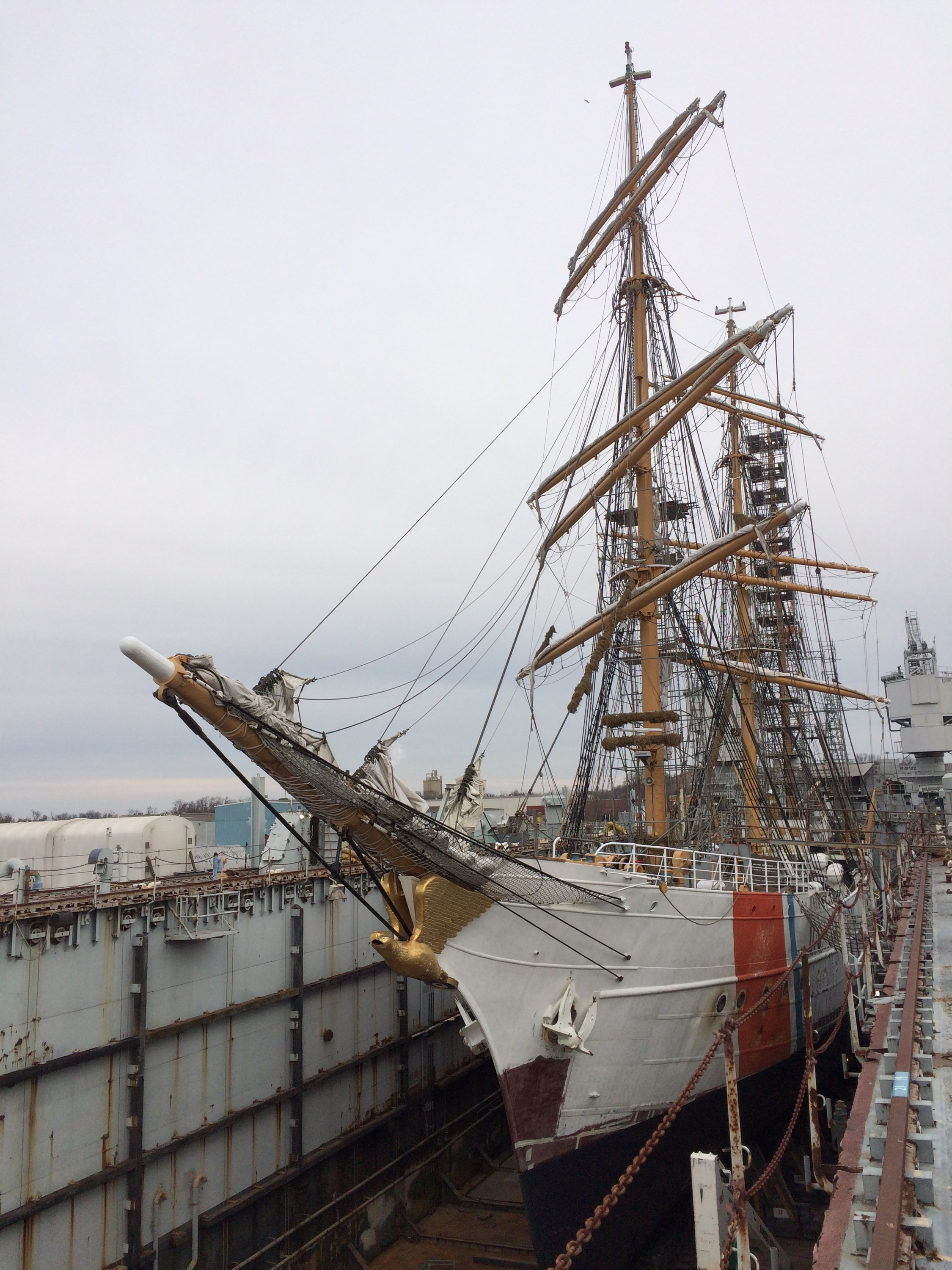
USCGC Eagle dry dock in Oak Ridge, 8 December 2017

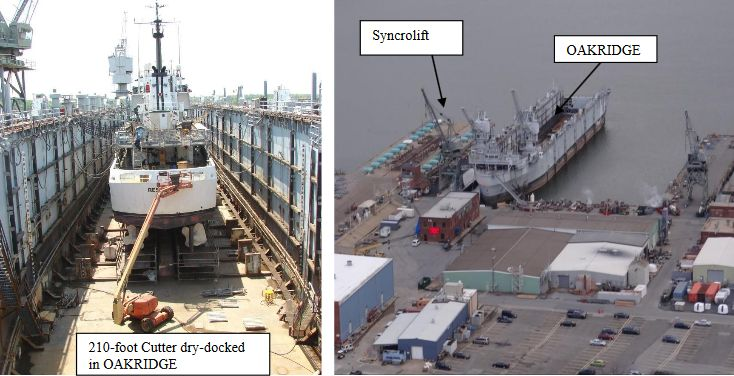
USS Oak Ridge

== Awards ==
- Asiatic-Pacific Campaign Medal with one battle star
- World War II Victory Medal
- National Defense Service Medal
