= USS Ross (DD-563) =

Fletcher-class destroyer

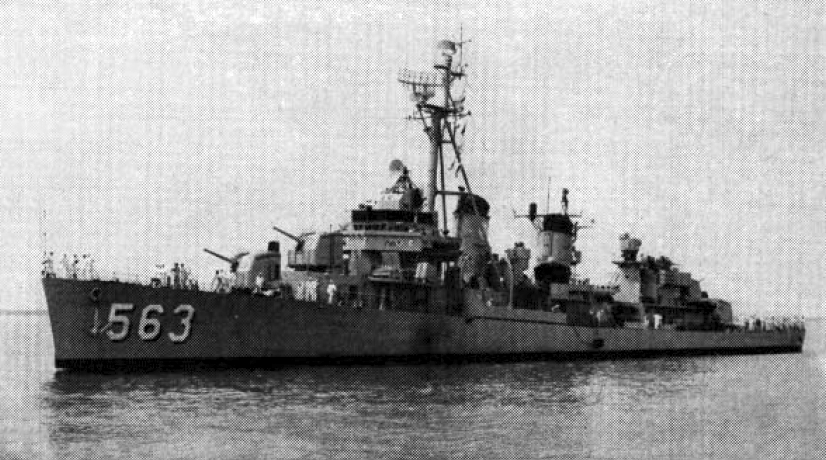
- USS Ross (DD-563) in 1957

History

United States
- Namesake: David Ross
- Builder: Seattle-Tacoma Shipbuilding Corporation
- Laid down: 7 September 1942
- Launched: 10 September 1943
- Commissioned: 21 February 1944
- Decommissioned: 6 November 1959
- Stricken: 1 December 1974
- Fate: Sunk as a target, 26 January 1978.

General characteristics
- Class & type: Fletcher-class destroyer
- Displacement: 2,050 tons
- Length: 376 ft 6 in (114.7 m)
- Beam: 39 ft 8 in (12.1 m)
- Draft: 17 ft 9 in (5.4 m)
- Propulsion: 60,000 shp (45 MW); 2 propellers
- Speed: 35 knots (65 km/h; 40 mph)
- Range: 6500 nmi. (12,000 km) @ 15 kt
- Complement: 314
- Armament: 5 × 5 in (130 mm), 4 × 40 mm AA guns, 4 × 20 mm AA guns, 10 × 21 inch (533 mm) torpedo tubes, 6 × depth charge projectors, 2 × depth charge tracks

USS Ross (DD-563) was a U.S. Navy Fletcher-class destroyer. Ross is the only ship in U.S. naval history to survive two underwater mine explosions.

== Namesake ==
David Ross was a lieutenant in the Continental Navy. He commanded the American private armed ship Belvedere (14 guns) at the end of the 18th century. While en route to London, on 23 December 1799, his ship was caught in a hurricane. Provisions, seven guns and a quantity of shot were thrown overboard to lighten ship. Nineteen days later, on 12 January 1800, Belvedere was overtaken by a French brig, whose captain demanded that the American haul down her flag. Ross's answer was a broadside. A two-hour engagement, within pistol shot, followed; and after the Frenchman had sheered off, Belvedere, with damage to its rigging, sails, and hull, continued on.

== Construction and commissioning ==
Ross was laid down on 7 September 1942 by the Seattle-Tacoma Shipbuilding Corp., Seattle, Washington and launched on 10 September 1943, sponsored by Mrs. William J. Malone. She was commissioned on 21 February 1944, Commander Benjamin Coe commanding.

She completed shakedown off California in early May 1944 and on 5 May sailed for Pearl Harbor. On 29 May she sortied with Task Force 52 (TF 52) for Eniwetok, whence the fleet sailed for Saipan and the beginning of the Marianas Campaign.

== Marianas and Palaus campaign ==
Attached to the carrier support group for the invasion of Saipan, Ross arrived on station in the operating area to the east of the island on 14 June. Through the landings on the 15th, and until the 19th, she remained in that area providing screening and plane guard services for the carriers. On 19 June, she headed east with Kalinin Bay (CVE-68) to rendezvous with replacement aircraft from Eniwetok. On the 25th, the two ships rejoined the Saipan support force. Ross remained in the vicinity of Saipan and Tinian well into July, interrupting duty there only at the beginning of the month to escort another replacement aircraft run.

On 1 August, the destroyer returned to Eniwetok, then headed for the Solomons to rehearse the Palau operation. On 6 September she departed Purvis Bay in Task Group 32.5 (TG 32.5), the Western Fire Support Group. Off Peleliu by dawn on 12 September, Ross screened the heavier ships as they began bombarding the proposed landing beaches. On the morning of the 13th, she closed White and Orange beaches to provide fire support for the Underwater Demolition Teams (UDTs) clearing the approaches of obstacles and through that day and the next she alternated between that mission and screening duty. On the night of 14–15 September, she shelled Ngesebus Island and conducted patrols to intercept enemy boat traffic. Then, prior to the 08:30 landings, she fired on enemy observation posts in the assault area. After the troops hit the beaches, she shifted to call fire support and until the 20th rotated that duty with night patrols and picket duty.

On 20 August, Ross headed for Ulithi. Arriving the next day, she covered UDT operations on Asor, Falalop, and Sorlen. On the 23d, she covered the landings on Falalop and on the 24th she got underway to return to Peleliu.

En route Ross stopped in Kossol Roads to embark Major General Julian Smith, USMC, and his staff, whom she transported to Peleliu. Arriving on 26 August, she provided harassing fire, call fire, and illumination until the 29th, when she sailed for Manus to prepare for her last amphibious operation, the invasion of Leyte.

== Ross disabled ==
On 12 October, Ross departed the Admiralties. Five days later she arrived off Dinagat Island. On the morning of the 18th, she covered landings there, on Black Beach 2, then joined Task Unit 77.2.6 (77.2.6) to provide cover for that minesweeping and hydrography unit. Her duty, however, ended abruptly less than 15 hours later.

At 01:33 on 19 October, she struck a mine to port under the forward engineroom and fireroom; and began to list to port. At 01:55 she struck a second mine in the vicinity of the after engineroom. The list increased to 14°.

Chickasaw (ATF-83) and Preserver (ARS-8) closed to render assistance.

Soon after 02:10, Ross jettisoned six torpedoes, all port depth charges, and miscellaneous gear. Topside movable weights were shifted to starboard. The list began to decrease. At 03:15, her medical officer, the seriously injured, and the ship's funds were transferred to Chickasaw. At 03:43, she was taken in tow by the ATF and 4 hours later anchored off Homonhon Island.

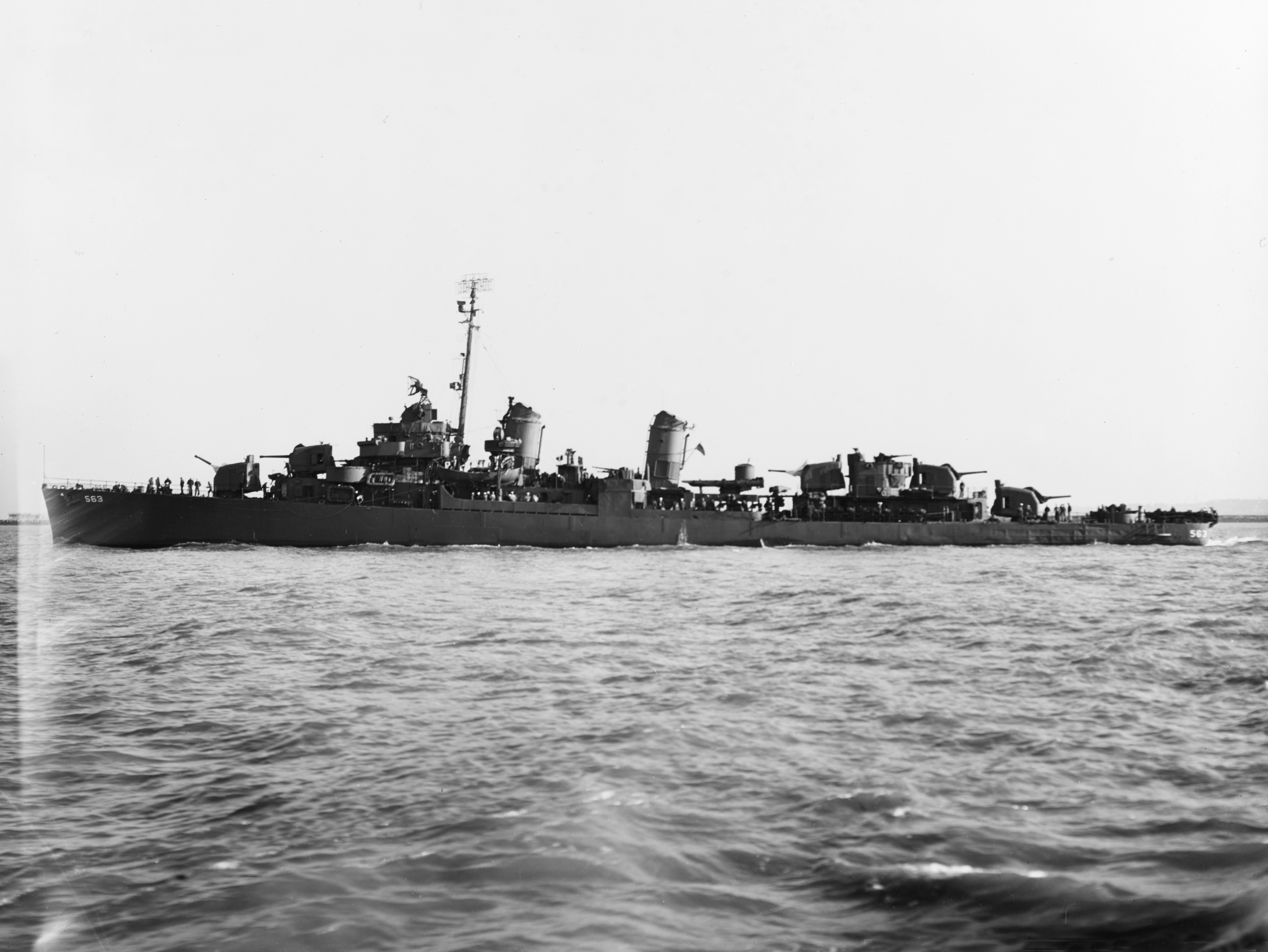
Ross in 1945.

Casualties from the mine explosions were three killed, 20 missing, nine injured. At 12:04 the anchorage was attacked by Japanese planes. Shrapnel injured two more from Ross' crew.

In the afternoon, the destroyer was towed to an anchorage south of Mariquitdaquit Island. At dawn on 20 October, that anchorage was attacked.

Salvage work on Ross began. Air attacks caused frequent interruptions, but the work continued. On 23 November, she was shifted to the Northern Transport Area anchorage and on the 24th, she was towed into San Pedro Bay and docked in floating drydock ARD-19. The frequent air raids continued, and on the 28th, Ross sustained further damage. A Nakajima Ki-44 "Tojo" crashed into the ARD, passed through the starboard wingwall, and caused gasoline-fed flames to encompass the dock basin deck. As firefighters went to work, another Japanese fighter began a strafing run, but was splashed by gunfire from Ross, the ARD and LST-556.

Repairs to Ross were delayed as the ARD's crew repaired the drydock, but on 13 December the destroyer was underway under tow, for Humboldt Bay. There, further repairs were made and her journey was continued. On 2 March 1945 she reached Mare Island.

Repairs complete, Ross moved down to San Diego at the end of June and in July she steamed for Pearl Harbor en route back to the Western Carolines. She arrived at Ulithi on 14 August, the day hostilities ended.

From 24 August to 4 September, Ross was on air-sea rescue duty as occupation troops were moved by air from Okinawa to Tokyo. On the 5th, she entered Tokyo Bay and into October remained on occupation duty.

Ross departed Japan for the United States on 21 October. On 9 November, she reported for inactivation at Seattle, and with the new year, she shifted to San Diego where she was decommissioned on 4 June 1946.

== 1951 – 1953 ==
For the next 5 years Ross remained berthed with the Reserve Fleet at San Diego. In the summer of 1951 she was activated and on 27 October she was recommissioned. Into March 1952 she operated off southern California. On the 12th, she departed San Diego for the U.S. east coast, escorting the Carriers Ranger and Antietam for their conversion to slant deck carriers at her new homeport, Naval Station Norfolk|Norfolk, Va., on the 29th, in company with another destroyer. Local operations occupied the summer; and, in late summer, she moved to Philadelphia Navy Yard for overhaul/conversion with a tri-pod mainmast to support high-tech radar/countermeasures and beefed-up 3.50" armament to counter missiles, replacing the 20/40mm AA armament. Also, acquiring another, smaller secondary tri-pod mast amidships, for AA firecontrol/countermeastures. In February 1953, she again steamed south, operated in the Caribbean into April, then returned to Norfolk to prepare for a summer cruise to Scotland and Norway. In August she was back in the Caribbean, and in September she returned to Norfolk. Further operations off the Atlantic seaboard and in the Caribbean followed, then in the spring of 1954 she began a cruise around the world.

== 1954 ==
Departing Norfolk 20 April, Ross transited the Panama Canal and crossed the Pacific. Arriving at Yokosuka, Japan on 28 May, she served with the 7th Fleet until the end of August, ranging from the Sea of Japan to the South China Sea. From 24 to 29 July she participated in operations off Indochina as residents of North Vietnam were allowed to move to South Vietnam.

On 31 August, Ross departed Sasebo, Japan. Then, steaming via Hong Kong, Singapore, Colombo, and the Suez Canal, she crossed the Mediterranean, and entered the Atlantic. On 28 October she reached Norfolk.

== 1955 – 1959 ==
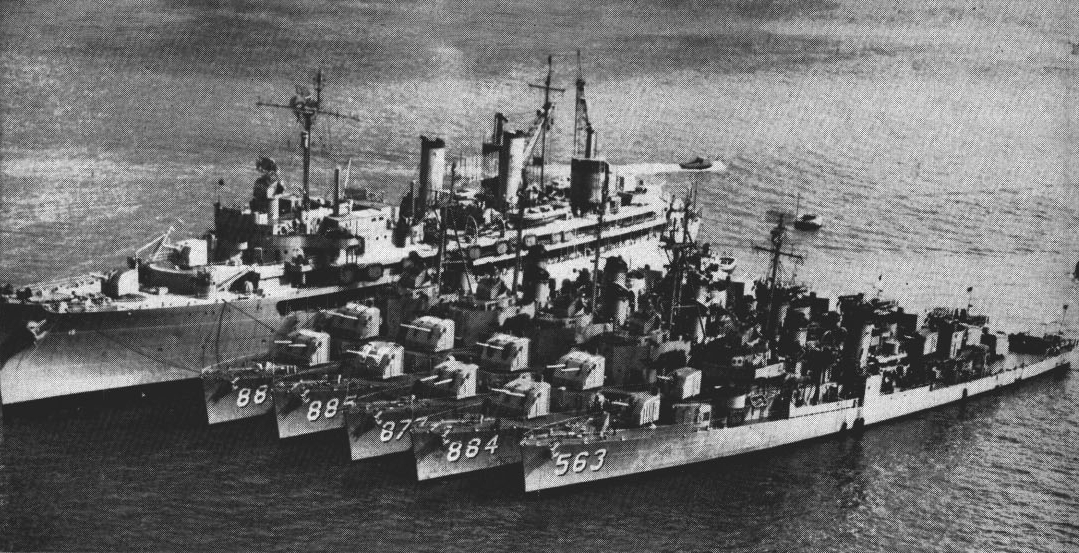
Ross tied up with other destroyers at USS Prairie (AD-15) in the 1950s.

Coastal and Caribbean operations were resumed in May 1955, following an overhaul. In November, she headed east and, for the next 2½ months, operated with the 6th Fleet in the Mediterranean. Returning to Norfolk on 26 February 1956, she conducted local operations through the spring, then repeated her 1953 schedule—a northern European cruise followed by exercises in the Caribbean.

In 1957, the destroyer again deployed to the Mediterranean. Departing the east coast in late October, she arrived at Gibraltar at the end of the month and continued on. On 8 November she transited the Suez Canal and until mid-December operated in the Red Sea, Persian Gulf, Indian Ocean area. She then retransmitted the Canal, and remained with the 6th Fleet until 16 February 1958.

Ross returned to Norfolk 5 March 1959. During the summer, she conducted her last summer cruise to Northern Europe. Into the summer she remained on the east coast. In July she operated in the Key West-Guantanamo Bay area and in August she departed Norfolk for Beaumont, Tex., and inactivation.

== Fate ==
In reserve from 10 August, Ross was decommissioned on 6 November 1959. The ship was stricken from the Naval Vessel Register 1 December 1974. She was sunk as a target off Puerto Rico 26 January 1978.

== Awards ==
Ross (DD-563) earned five battle stars during World War II.
