= USS Whale (SSN-638) =

Submarine of the United States

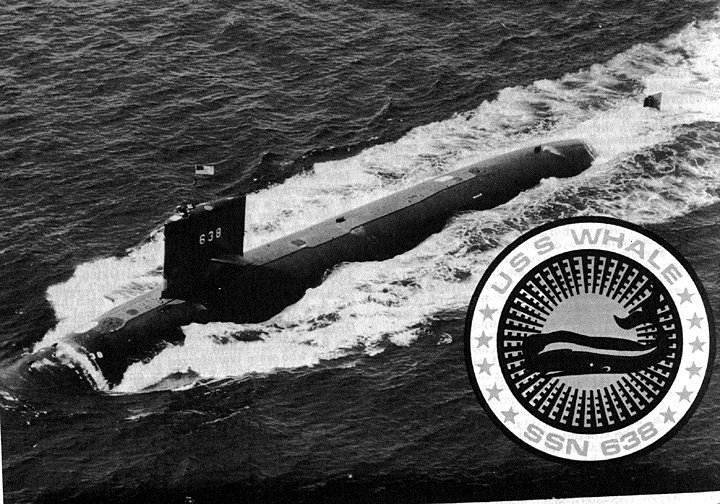
- USS Whale (SSN-638) and her ship's insignia

History

United States
- Name: Whale
- Namesake: The whale
- Builder: General Dynamics Quincy Shipbuilding Division, Quincy, Massachusetts
- Laid down: 27 May 1964
- Launched: 14 October 1966
- Sponsored by: Mrs. Russell B. Long
- Commissioned: 12 October 1968
- Decommissioned: 25 June 1996
- Stricken: 25 June 1996
- Identification: Hull symbol: SSN-638; Call sign: NSIG
- Honors and awards: Battle Efficiency Award (Battle "E") (1991)
- Fate: Scrapping via Ship and Submarine Recycling Program, 29 September 1997

General characteristics
- Class & type: Sturgeon-class attack submarine
- Displacement: 3,860 long tons (3,922 t) surfaced; 4,640 long tons (4,714 t) submerged
- Length: 292 ft 3 in (89.08 m)
- Beam: 31 ft 8 in (9.65 m)
- Draft: 28 ft 8 in (8.74 m)
- Installed power: 15,000 shp (11,185.5 kW)
- Propulsion: 1 × S5W nuclear reactor; 2 × steam turbines; 1 × shaft
- Speed: 15 kn (28 km/h; 17 mph) surfaced; 25 knots (46 km/h; 29 mph) submerged
- Test depth: 1,300 ft (396 m)
- Complement: 107
- Armament: 4 × 21-inch (533 mm) torpedo tubes; Mark 48 torpedoes; UUM-44A SUBROC missiles; UGM-84A/C Harpoon missiles; Tomahawk cruise missiles

USS Whale (SSN-638) was a Sturgeon-class submarine nuclear-powered attack submarine of the United States Navy. She was the second ship of that name, after the whale family of aquatic mammals.

== Construction and commissioning ==
Whale's keel was laid down on 27 May 1964, at the General Dynamics Quincy Shipbuilding Division shipyard, in Quincy, Massachusetts. She was launched on 14 October 1966, sponsored by Mrs. Russell B. Long, the wife of United States Senator Russell B. Long, of Louisiana, and commissioned on 12 October 1968.

== Service history ==
=== 1968 ===
Whale arrived in her first home port, Charleston, South Carolina, on 2 November 1968, and, after a week in port, put to sea on 9 November 1968, for shakedown training, which she completed in November and December 1968, along with a series of post-commissioning tests, trials, and qualifications. In January 1969, she began normal operations out of Charleston, with attack submarine training along the southeastern coast of the United States.

=== 1969 ===
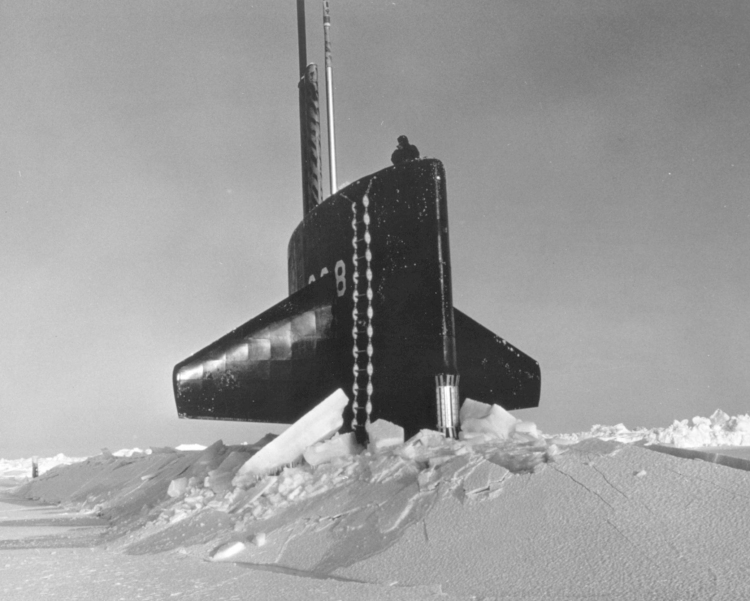
Whale at the North Pole, in April 1969

On 18 March 1969, Whale stood out of Charleston, on her way north to operations above the Arctic Circle. She reached the North Pole, on 6 April 1969, and surfaced there in commemoration of the 60th anniversary of Rear Admiral Robert E. Peary's 1909 arrival there. Following that event, she completed her mission under the polar ice cap and then headed south. After a visit to Faslane, Scotland, she voyaged home to Charleston, where she arrived on 9 May 1969.

Following two months of local operations out of Charleston, Whale sailed for Groton, Connecticut, and her post-shakedown repair period. After three months in the shipyard of the Electric Boat Division of the General Dynamics Corporation, at Groton, she started back to Charleston, on 16 October 1969. She arrived at Charleston, on 20 October, and conducted local operations for the remainder of 1969.

=== 1970 ===
During the first half of 1970, Whale continued operations out of Charleston. In late January, she participated in tests with a Navy Underwater Demolition Team and, in February and March, took part in three major fleet exercises. In April, she headed north for a brief tour of duty as training ship for the Prospective Commanding Officers' School at New London, Connecticut. She returned to Charleston, at the end of the first week in May, and spent the remainder of the month conducting acoustic trials.

Whale departed Charleston, on 27 July 1970, for an overseas deployment which she concluded in mid-September, with visits to Faslane and Holy Loch, in Scotland. While Whale visited Scotland, the Jordanian crisis, precipitated by civil war between the government of Jordan and the Palestine Liberation Organization (PLO) and aggravated by an incursion into northern Jordan by Syrian tanks, resulted a show of American strength in the eastern Mediterranean. Whale received orders to join the United States Sixth Fleet, in the Mediterranean, and did so near the end of September 1970. She remained in the Mediterranean through October and into November 1970. When the crisis abated, she headed for Charleston, arriving home on 18 November 1970, and remaining there for the remainder of the year.

=== 1971–1972 ===
Three fleet exercises and local operations out of Charleston, occupied Whale during the first half of 1971. Late in July, she deployed once more for special operations in the Atlantic Ocean, concluding that cruise late in September 1971, at Bremerhaven, West Germany. She returned to Charleston, on 12 October 1971, and resumed local operations upon arrival. That routine continued until 20 March 1972, when she departed once again for another special operations cruise in the Atlantic. At the end of that voyage, she made a brief call at Holy Loch, before returning to Charleston, on 9 June 1972.

Almost two months after her return to the United States, Whale left Charleston, and headed north to Naval Submarine Base New London, Connecticut, her new home port. She entered the shipyard at the Electric Boat Division, in Groton, on 7 August 1972, for a 46-week overhaul and remained there undergoing repairs until 27 October 1973.

=== 1973–1974 ===
Whale completed post-overhaul shakedown and refresher training in November and December 1973, and began preparations for another deployment to the Mediterranean, in response to the Middle Eastern crisis brought about by the Arab-Israeli War, in October 1973. Late in January 1974, however, she received notification that her deployment had been delayed until May 1974. During the interim, she conducted normal operations out of Groton, including submarine anti-submarine warfare (ASW) exercises, attack submarine training, and a major fleet exercise, Operation Safe Passage. On 3 May 1974, she departed Groton en route the Mediterranean Sea. On 12 May 1974, she changed operational control from the United States Second Fleet to the Sixth Fleet.

While in the Mediterranean, Whale participated in two North Atlantic Treaty Organization (NATO) exercises, "International Week" and "Dale Falcon", with units of the Greek and Italian navies as well as several ASW exercises with other units of the Sixth Fleet. She passed through the Strait of Gibraltar and changed operational control back to the Commander, Submarines, United States Atlantic Fleet, on 18 October 1974. During the voyage back to Groton, Whale participated in a fleet ASW exercise which she completed on 28 October 1974. On 30 October 1974, she arrived at Groton.

=== 1975–1976 ===
Whale spent the next 11 months engaged in operations out of Groton. Various tests and evaluations occupied January, and the first half of February 1975. Between then and June 1975, she provided training services for various units of the Atlantic Fleet and for prospective commanding officers. Whale also served as a training platform for midshipmen during indoctrination cruises held late in the summer. On 29 September 1975, she stood out of Groton, for another deployment with the Sixth Fleet. During that cruise, she took part in a major Second Fleet exercise, "Ocean Safari", and after joining the Sixth Fleet in the Mediterranean Sea, took part in a succession of unilateral, bilateral, and multilateral exercises with units of the navies of Greece, France, Italy, and the Netherlands. She completed her tour of duty with the Sixth Fleet during the second week in March 1976, and arrived at Groton on 25 March 1976.

=== 1976–1978 ===
Whale resumed normal United States East Coast operations until 9 September 1976, when she entered the Portsmouth Naval Shipyard at Kittery, Maine, for a refueling overhaul. That overhaul concluded on 7 July 1978. Whale then spent the remainder of 1978 in refresher training for the purpose of obtaining certification throughout the full range of her weapons system.

=== 1979–1987 ===
In April 1979, Whale departed Groton, for the Mediterranean. She made stops in Sousse, Tunisia; La Spezia, LaMaddellena and Naples, Italy and Tangier, Morocco. While in the Mediterranean Whale participated in fleet exercises. 1979-Fall, 1980: Whale was in an extended period of refit/repair (Selected Restricted Availability), in the floating drydock Shippingport in Groton, Connecticut. After refloating, workups, and training, she proceeded south for torpedo proficiency exercises, stopping for liberty at Port Everglades, Florida. Go Go dancers from Butch Cassidy's greeted Whale and her crew on arrival, and were heartily welcomed aboard. Whale spent the remainder of 1980, and early 1981, on short training and test deployments, one of which concluded with the "Thunderbuoy" and "Whitefish" exercises. With a fresh coat of paint, and a new skipper, CDR E.D. Morrow, Whale proceeded to the Mediterranean in June 1981, stopping on her way at Cartagena, Spain, which proved to be her only liberty port on this deployment. Whale spent the next six months in the Mediterranean Sea, taking part in the US Navy's defiance of Libyan president Mohammar Khadaffi's "Line of Death" in the Gulf of Sidra. Whale made periodic up-keeps at the submarine tender Orion, in La Maddelena, Sardinia. Early 1982, found Whale back home in Groton, making frequent short training workup runs, honing the crew's proficiency to a fine tune. In May 1982, Whale proceeded on an Atlantic deployment, (pollywogs among the crew becoming "Bluenoses" on the way), and later a stop in Faslane, Scotland. Whale earned the Battle "E" for efficiency after this deployment. Early 1983, Whale had a new skipper, Captain James E. Welsch. Mid 1983, Whale was suddenly given a double barrel patrol – a North Atlantic deployment immediately followed by an abbreviated Mediterranean patrol. This was due to Tullibee being unable to handle her commitments. This deployment, dubbed the "Nor-Med Run", was quite active, with port visits in Holy Loch, Scotland, Toulon, France, and La Spezia and La Maddalena, Italy. Whale left La Maddalena, on Christmas Day 1983, and returned to Groton, in January 1984. 1984 was spent doing up keep, refit, drilling, and short training deployments, most notably spending a week in St Croix, Virgin Islands. In January 1985, Whale again went on patrol to the Mediterranean, with stops in Holy Loch, Scotland, Brest, France, La Maddalena, Italy, as well as Rotterdam, Netherlands, prior to Whale being temporarily reassigned to Puget Sound Naval Shipyard, at Bremerton, Washington, for an overhaul period starting in November 1985. While undergoing overhaul in 1986, Whale crew members formed a unit softball team, which competed in and won the Northwestern Pacific Softball Championship. For a crew of roughly 120 to compete against much larger ships and commands, this was quite an accomplishment.

=== 1988–1995 ===
January 1988, Whale was in Bremerton, completing its overhaul. She went through sea trials and left Washington, in May 1988, for her to return to her home port at Groton, under the command of Commander J. W. Francis. Whale crossed the equator on 17 June 1988, and transited the Panama Canal, on 19 June 1988, finally returning to Groton, as an operational unit of Submarine Squadron 10.

Whale's next major deployment was to the Mediterranean from January through June 1989, during which she made stops in Scotland, Portugal, Spain, and Italy.

From August through December 1990, Whale was sent on a North Atlantic deployment under the command of Commander Ronald Deering, for which she was awarded her fifth Meritorious Unit Commendation.

In 1991, Whale was awarded the last Battle Efficiency Award (Battle "E") from Submarine Squadron 10 She then was assigned to Submarine Squadron 2 and conducted a second "Northern Run" (i.e., North Atlantic deployment) in 1991.

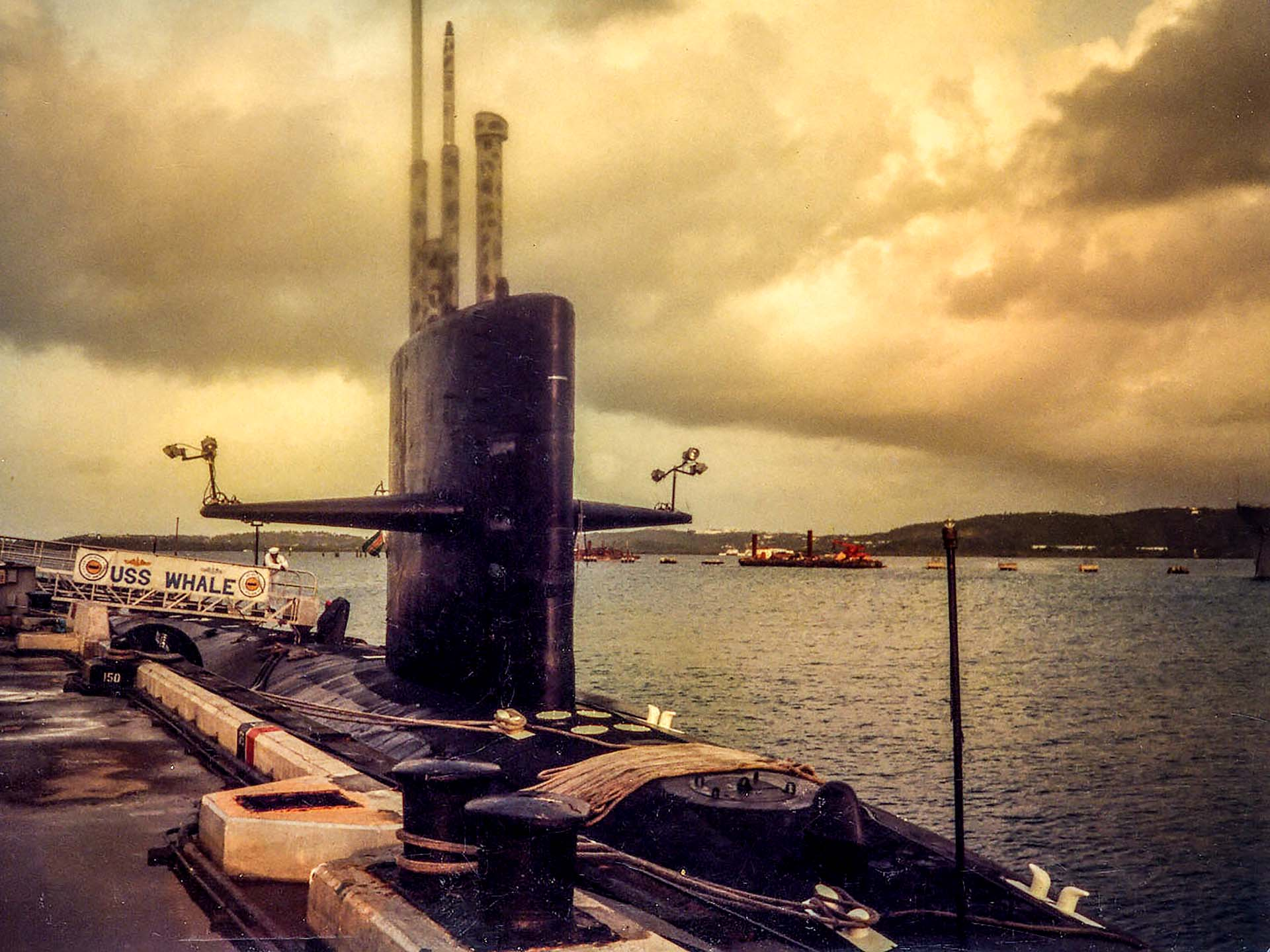
USS Whale in Puerto Rico, 1992

In 1992, Whale participated in UNITAS XXXIII, an expedition around South America while under the command of Commander Andrew V. Harris, Jr., During UNITAS XXXIII she made port calls in Puerto Rico, Brazil, Argentina, Chile, Ecuador, Panama, and Colombia. The port visit in Panama was a somber one due to the sudden loss of the ship's chief yeoman due to a heart attack. During UNITAS Whale again crossed the Equator, and transited the Panama Canal, (South to North), returning to port in November.

In 1993, Whale visited Bermuda, while transiting from the Autec Torpedo Firing Range, and Florida ports of call, conducted a scientific exercise under the ice cap at the North Pole and in the North Atlantic.

Following the final Change of Command in January 1994, Whale deployed to the Arctic with HMS Trenchant (S91) in support of combined United States and Royal Navy testing of submarine equipment as well as collection of environmental data in the polar region. JOINTSUBICEX 1-94 saw Whale's second North Pole surfacing on 16 April 1994, 25 years and 10 days, after her first polar surfacing in 1969. Around this time, Whale circumnavigated the globe by circling the North Pole underwater to earn each crewmember the Order of Magellan. This circumnavigation occurred in about 15 minutes as the ship used underwater navigational means to cross every longitude, a feat that only a submarine could accomplish in 1994. Following visits to Norway, Germany and Scotland, Whale returned to SUBRON TWO in July 1994.

Following a circumnavigation of the world, Whale was deactivated while still in commission on 28 April 1995. Whale was placed in reserve, in commission, on 1 October 1995.

== Decommissioning and disposal ==
Whale's scrapping via the U.S. Navy's Nuclear-Powered Ship and Submarine Recycling Program at Puget Sound Naval Shipyard, at Bremerton, began on 20 October 1995. She was officially decommissioned on 25 June 1996, and stricken from the Naval Vessel Register the same day. Her scrapping was completed on 1 July 1996, and she was officially listed as scrapped on 29 September 1997.

== Bibliography ==
- "Whale II (SSN-638)". Naval History and Heritage Command. 28 October 2015. This article incorporates text from this source, which is in the public domain.
- "USS Whale (SSN-638)". NavSource.
