= USS Atakapa =

Tugboat of the United States Navy

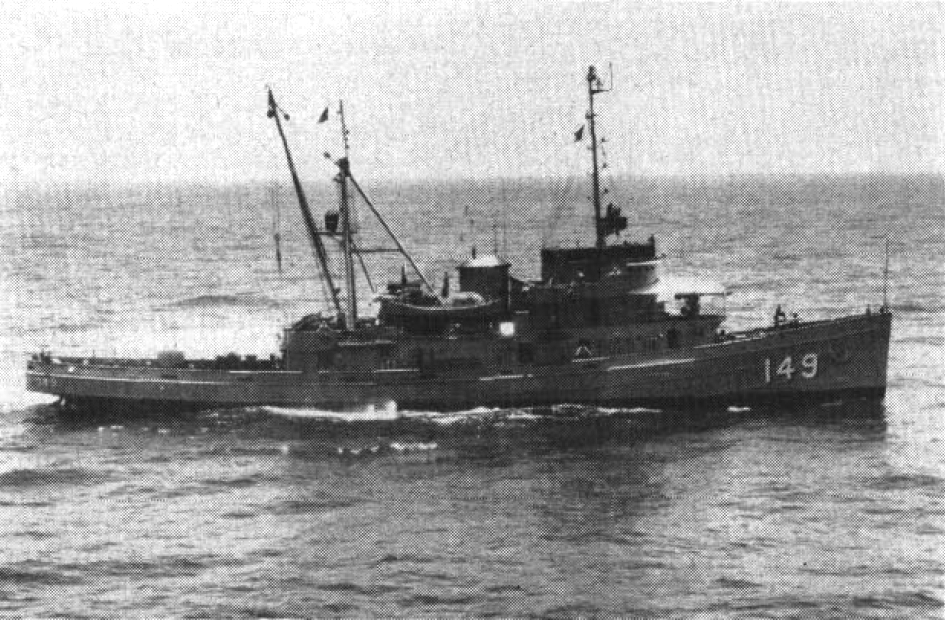
- USS Atakapa (ATF-149) c1954

History

United States
- Name: USS Atakapa
- Laid down: 17 February 1944
- Launched: 11 July 1944
- Commissioned: 8 December 1944
- Stricken: 21 February 1992
- Identification: ATF-149
- Honours and awards: Navy Expeditionary Medal (3-Cuba); American Campaign Medal; Asiatic-Pacific Campaign Medal; World War II Victory Medal; Navy Occupation Service Medal (with Asia clasp); National Defense Service Medal; Armed Forces Expeditionary Medal (1-Lebanon)
- Fate: Disposed of in support of Fleet training exercise, 2000

General characteristics
- Class & type: Achomawi-class fleet ocean tug
- Displacement: 1,675 tons
- Length: 205 ft 0 in (62.48 m)
- Beam: 38 ft 6 in (11.73 m)
- Draught: 15 ft 4 in (4.67 m)
- Propulsion: 4 × General Motors 12-278A diesel main engines; 4 × General Electric generators; 3 × General Motors 3-268A auxiliary services engines; single screw; 3,600 shp (2,700 kW)
- Speed: 16.5 knots (30.6 km/h; 19.0 mph)
- Complement: 6 officers; 71 enlisted
- Armament: 1 x 3 in (76 mm); 2 x 40-mm, 2 x 20-mm, 2 depth charge tracks

USS Atakapa (ATF-149) was an Achomawi class of fleet ocean tug. It was named after the Atakapa Native American tribe that once inhabited territory which is now southwestern Louisiana and southeastern Texas.

== Construction history ==
The fleet ocean tug (ATF-149) was laid down on 17 February 1944 at Charleston, South Carolina, by the Charleston Shipbuilding & Drydock Company; launched on 11 July 1944; sponsored by Mrs. B.H. Wiggs; and commissioned at the Charleston Navy Yard on 8 December 1944.

== Operational history ==
=== World War II service ===
After shakedown in the Norfolk, Virginia area, Atakapa undertook her first assignment, a tow from the East Coast to California, departing Philadelphia on 22 January 1945 and reaching San Francisco on 8 March. From that day through 27 April, she engaged in routine towing operations along the West Coast. The ship sailed for Hawaii on the 27th and, upon her arrival at Pearl Harbor on 10 May, resumed her towing operations. This duty was interrupted by a long tow from Pearl Harbor to Eniwetok, which began on 20 June. After reaching Eniwetok on 10 July, Atakapa left three days later bound for Johnston Island where she took two craft in tow and proceeded back to Pearl Harbor which she reached on 26 July.

Atakapa engaged in towing and salvage operations until 11 August when she departed the Hawaiian Islands bound for the Aleutians. The tug reached Adak on 22 August, a week after Japan capitulated. The units gathered there formed Task Force (TF) 42 and sailed on 1 September for Ominato, Japan. They reached Japan on 13 September, and Atakapa served in Japanese waters into April 1946.

The tug returned to Pearl Harbor on 23 April for repairs before heading for the United States late in May. She transited the Panama Canal on 14 June and reached Jacksonville, Florida, on the 25th. The ship reported to Orange, Texas, on 21 August for duty and ultimate transfer to the inactive fleet. She was placed out of commission, in reserve, on 8 November 1946.

=== Post-war service ===
Atakapa was recommissioned at Orange on 9 August 1951, slightly over a year after Communist forces invaded South Korea. She held shakedown training at Newport, Rhode Island, and Norfolk, Virginia, and made the first major tow of her new career in February 1952, when she pulled a large vessel from Panama to Philadelphia. From April to July, Atakapa was stationed at Guantánamo Bay, Cuba, and devoted herself largely to target towing. The vessel returned to Norfolk in July and spent the remainder of the year providing general towing and salvage services in the Norfolk area and along the East Coast.

For the next five and one-half years, Atakapa maintained a busy schedule of towing and salvage operations. She visited ports along the East Coast, in the Caribbean, and along the Gulf Coast. On 23 July 1958, the tug began her first Mediterranean deployment in response to internal disorder in Lebanon. While operating with the 6th Fleet, she provided towing and salvage services and made port calls at Suda Bay, Crete; Beirut, Lebanon; Athens and Rhodes, Greece; and Catania, Sicily. Before returning to the United States, Atakapa towed a ship through the Suez Canal from Massawa, Ethiopia, to Naples, Italy.

The tug spent 1959 and 1960 providing general services to East Coast ships. In early 1961, she spent six weeks in Puerto Rico participating in Operation "Springboard" and then crossed the Atlantic in May and June with a tow from Mayport, Florida, to Holy Loch, Scotland. Atakapa began 1962 in upkeep at Little Creek, Virginia, but soon sailed for the Caribbean to take part in Operation "Springboard 62." She provided towing and target retrieval service for units serving at Guantánamo Bay. Atakapa returned to Norfolk in June for a tender availability. Upon its completion, she provided services for submarines operating out of Norfolk. In October, the tug reported for duty in the Caribbean in response to the Cuban Missile Crisis but returned home when tension subsided and ended the year at Little Creek.

On 4 January 1963, Atakapa sailed to San Juan, Puerto Rico, to take part in Operation "Springboard" for the third straight year, but was back in Little Creek on 7 February for a short availability. During March and April, she received an overhaul. After two months of refresher training, she put to sea in early October, bound for Guantánamo Bay. The tug returned to Little Creek in late November and finished the year in upkeep. For the first few months of 1964, Atakapa operated in the Norfolk area. In June, she proceeded to Rota, Spain, with Oak Ridge in tow. After releasing the medium auxiliary repair dry dock, she remained deployed with the 6th Fleet for four months. The tug got underway in October to return to the United States, but was diverted en route to escort an LST to Bermuda and thence to Norfolk. They arrived in Hampton Roads on 17 November, and Atakapa spent the rest of the year undergoing a tender availability.

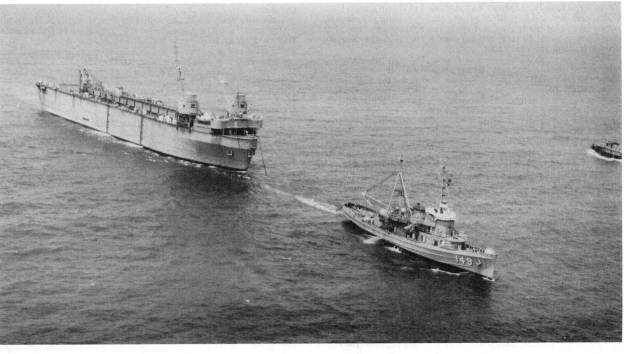
Atakapa brings Oak Ridge into Rota, Spain, 26 June 1964.

After a brief period of local operations, Atakapa sailed in early 1965 to the Caribbean to participate in Operation "Springboard." Early in April, she returned to the Norfolk area for an overhaul at the Norfolk Shipbuilding & Drydock Company. Upon completing the yard period, the tug resumed operations in the Virginia Capes area. Late in the year, she operated briefly at Guantánamo Bay and, after visiting Ocho Rios, Jamaica, returned to Little Creek.

The ship's first major activity of 1967 was once again Operation "Springboard" in which she participated from 6 to 19 March. The tug entered restricted availability at Norfolk on 23 April and, soon after it ended, began a deployment to northern Europe on 15 May. She operated in the Norwegian Sea and visited ports in Norway, Scotland, and the Netherlands before returning to Little Creek on 1 October. She operated in the Virginia Capes area through the end of the year and into May 1967. On the 19th of that month, the tug got underway for Scotland, reached Holy Loch on 30 May, and on 6 June was underway again for Rota. She operated in the Mediterranean until late September and visited the ports of Suda Bay, Crete; Valletta, Malta; Naples, Italy; Piraeus, Greece; İzmir, Turkey; and Palma de Mallorca. Atakapa touched back at Little Creek on 29 September; completed a period of leave and upkeep: and, on 27 November, entered overhaul at the Norfolk Shipbuilding & Drydock Company. The overhaul was completed in mid-April 1968, and the vessel began refresher training. On 13 June, she got underway for operations in European waters and made port calls in Spain, England, Italy, Greece, and Crete. The tug left Rota on 12 October; returned to Little Creek on 22 October; and, on 17 December, began an availability alongside USS Vulcan.

On 25 February 1969, Atakapa shifted to Little Creek for upkeep. On 15 April, she was deployed to western Europe. She made port calls at Rosyth and Holy Loch, Scotland; Bergen, Norway; Aalborg, Denmark; and Portsmouth, England. She departed Rota on 24 September and reached Little Creek on 7 October. Late in January 1970, she sailed for Portsmouth, New Hampshire, to tow a ship back to Little Creek. She was deployed to Guantánamo Bay on 13 May to provide target services for warships undergoing gunnery practice. The ship left Cuba on 12 June and next towed a ship from Mayport, Florida, to Philadelphia. On 25 June, the tug was back in the Virginia Capes area. Routine towing duties to various ports along the East Coast occupied her until 16 October, when she sailed for Baltimore, Maryland, for hull repairs. On 27 October, she shifted back to a shipyard in Newport News, Virginia, for the remainder of the overhaul. Refresher training and upkeep lasted until late in March 1971. Atakapa made a brief voyage to St. Thomas, Virgin Islands, then returned to Little Creek on 9 April. She was involved in routine towing operations along the East Coast until 11 November when she sailed for Guantánamo Bay. The tug returned to Little Creek on 21 December for the holidays.

After one and one-half months of training, Atakapa deployed to Roosevelt Roads, Puerto Rico, on 16 February 1972. She provided target services for units participating in Operation "Springboard," but was back in home port on 23 March. On 1 May, the tug towed USS Cache to Beaumont, Texas, and then pulled a vessel from that gulf port back to Norfolk, arriving there on 16 May. Local operations and availability occupied Atakapa through 21 July, when she got underway for Guantánamo Bay. She operated from that Cuban port for the next five weeks and then returned to Little Creek on 30 August for local operations through the rest of the year and the first months of 1973. On 11 April, Atakapa sailed for Guantánamo Bay, but was back in the Virginia Capes area on 15 May. Another Caribbean deployment occurred from 28 June to 9 August. After her return home, the tug operated along the East Coast. In early 1974, Atakapa sailed for the Caribbean for the annual "Springboard" operations. She operated along the East Coast for the last few months of her career as a commissioned Navy ship.

== Decommissioning and disposal ==
On 1 July 1974, the tug was decommissioned and turned over to the Military Sealift Command (MSC). Operating with a civil service crew, USNS Atakapa (T-ATF-149) continued to support the Navy carrying out MSC missions for another seven years. During the summer of 1981, she was taken out of service and prepared for transfer to the Maritime Administration's National Defense Reserve Fleet. In September 1981, Atakapa – still Navy property – was berthed at the Maritime Administration facility at James River, Virginia.

Following Congressional approval in 1996 for transfer to the Northeast Wisconsin Railroad Transportation Commission, she was handed over on 29 December 1997 to the Ontonagon County Economic Development Corporation on behalf of the Escanaba and Lake Superior Railroad, along with five other obsolete sister tugs. They were intended for a new trans-Lake Superior freight car barge service between Ontonagon and Thunder Bay, Ontario, though it has been suggested that the company sought the tug's four General Motors engines (24 in all) to use in their locomotives. The project was abandoned in October 1999, shortly before title would have passed to the railroad company. Atakapa remained in lay-up between 1997 and 1999.

On 25 August 2000, Atakapa was sunk as a target in 20.40.80N 64.05W during a fleet training exercise.
