= Shippingport (ARDM-4) =

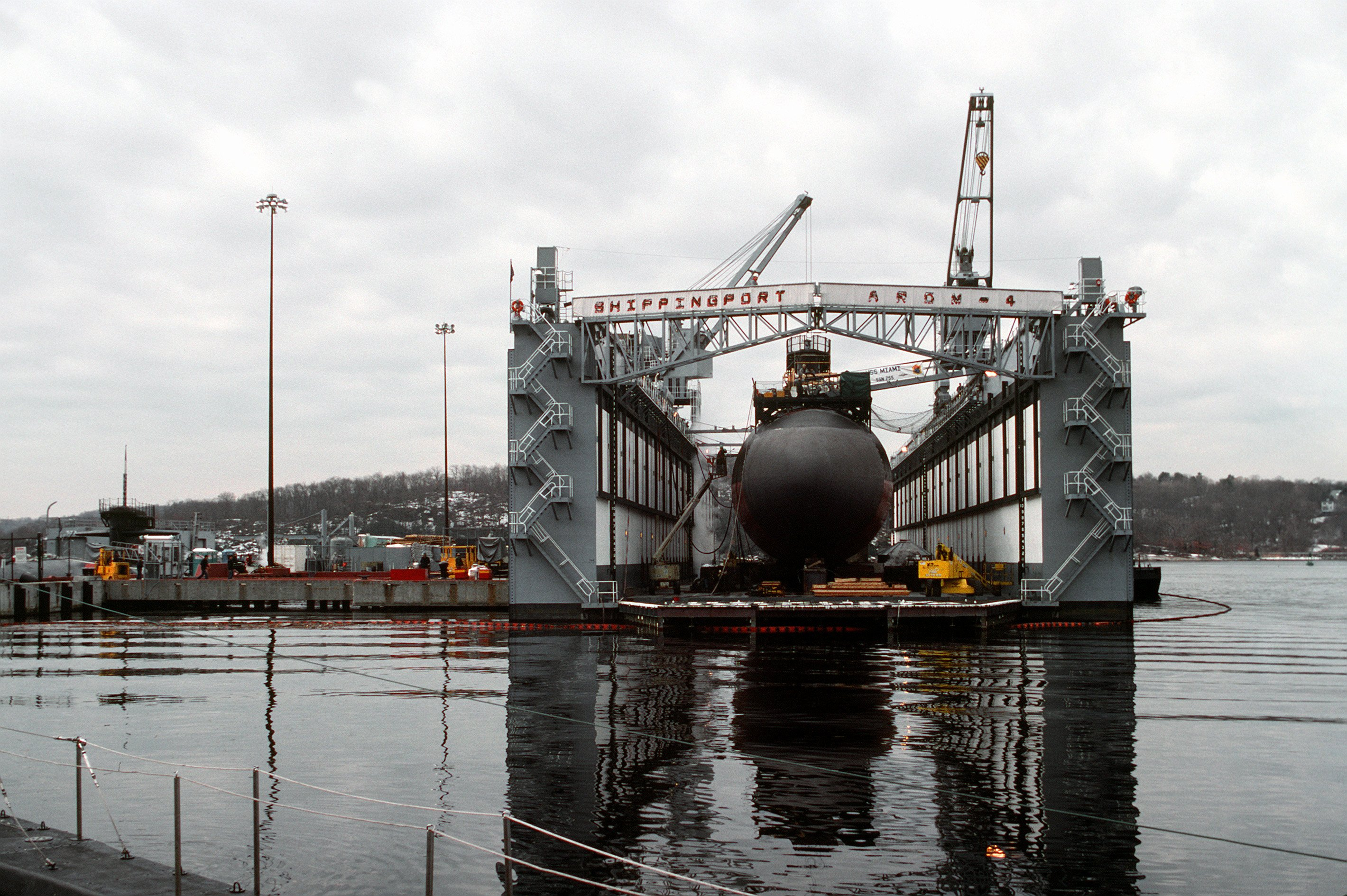
- Bow-on view of USS Miami (SSN-755) in Shippingport (ARDM-4) during a routine hull inspection at Naval Submarine Base New London, in Groton, Connecticut.

History

United States
- Name: Shippingport (ARDM-4)
- Namesake: Shippingport, Pennsylvania
- Builder: Bethlehem Steel, Shipyard, Sparrows Point, Maryland
- Laid down: 5 April 1977
- Launched: 2 September 1977
- In service: 4 January 1979
- Refit: completed September 2012
- Status: active, Naval Submarine Support Facility, New London, Connecticut

General characteristics
- Class & type: ARDM-4-class
- Displacement: 5400 tons
- Length: 492 ft 0 in (149.96 m)
- Beam: 96 ft (29.3 m)
- Propulsion: None
- Complement: 131

Shippingport (ARDM-4) is an ARDM-4-class United States Navy Medium Auxiliary Repair Dry Dock. She is one of the Navy's two medium auxiliary repair dry docks, and was the first floating dry dock built for the US Navy since World War II. Laid down in 1977, delivered and placed in service on 4 January 1979, she is still in service at the Naval Submarine Support Facility at Naval Submarine Base New London, in Groton, Connecticut.

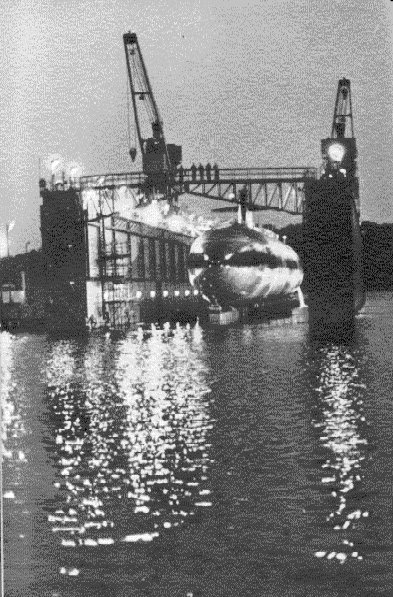
Shippingport (ARDM-4) with USS Philadelphia (SSN-690) high and dry in her floating dock undergoing a routine hull inspection at Naval Sub Base, in Groton, CT

With a displacement of 5400 tons, this floating dry dock had a lifting capacity of 7800 tons. Shippingport has two 25 ton portal gantry cranes on tracks, one running along the top deck of each hull side superstructure. She is a government owned, private contractor operated, restored and certified drydock used to execute submarine repairs.

In October 2010, while Shippingport (ARDM-4) was nearing the end of her overhaul at BAE Systems Ship Repair at Norfolk, Virginia, the U.S. Department of Defense (DoD) announced that General Dynamics Electric Boat was awarded an additional $6.5 million to its contract for ship forces duties during Shippingport's naval service craft overhaul (SCO) and recertification. In September 2012, after being out of service for almost four years, Shippingport completed her SCO and year-long recertification. The SCO included structural modifications to enable a lifting capacity to support a Virginia-class (SSN) nuclear attack submarine. In November 2013, General Dynamics Electric Boat announced it was awarded an additional $7.1 million contract by Naval Sea Systems Command (NAVSEA) for further repairs and preservation of floating dry dock Shippingport (ARDM-4), with the work to be completed by September 2014.
