= USS LST-556 =

1944 LST-542-class tank landing ship

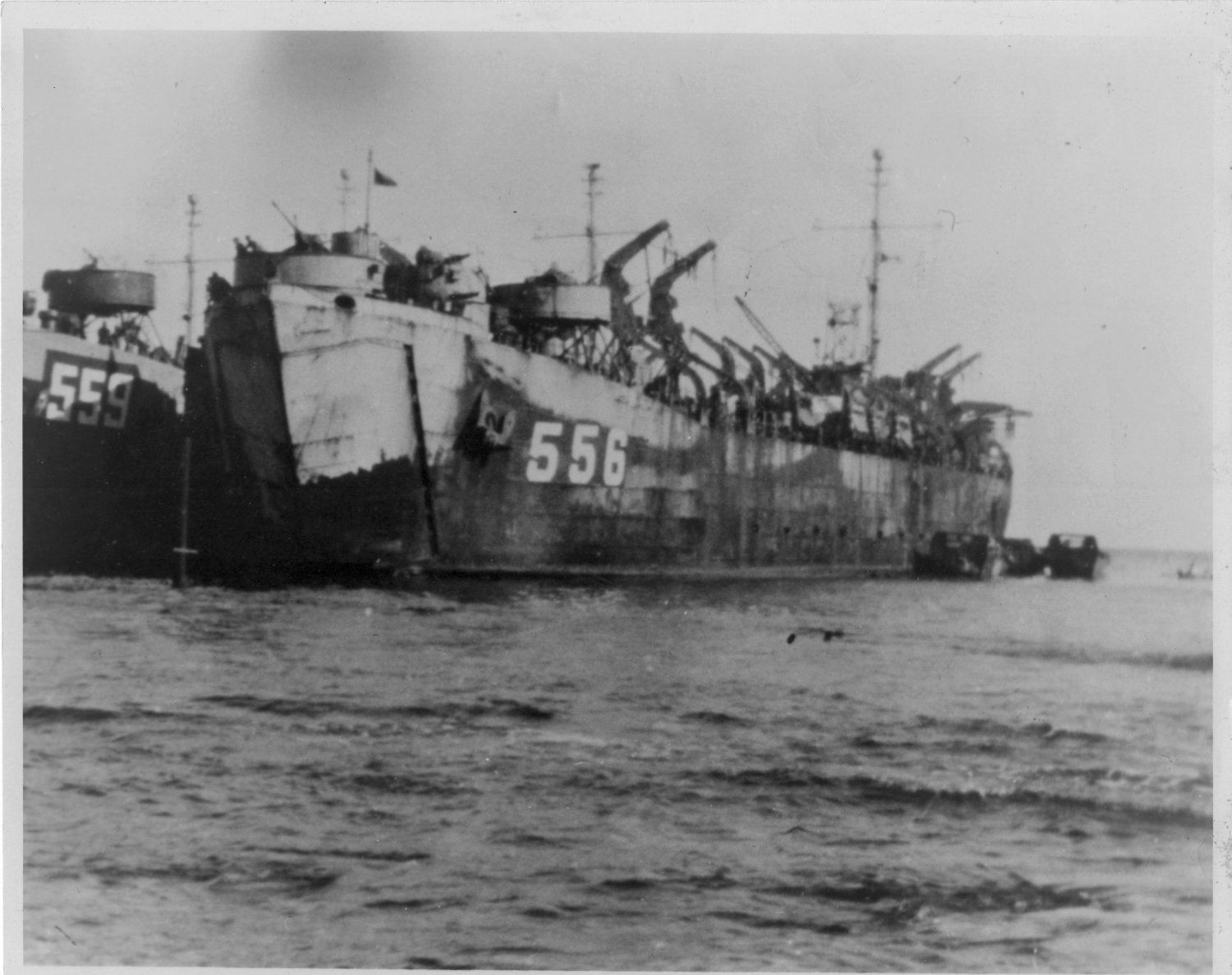
- LST-556 and LST-559.

History

United States
- Name: USS LST-556
- Builder: Missouri Valley Bridge and Iron Company, Evansville, Indiana
- Laid down: 4 February 1944
- Launched: 7 April 1944
- Sponsored by: Mrs. James C. Bradshaw
- Commissioned: 1 May 1944
- Decommissioned: 14 March 1946
- Stricken: 12 April 1946
- Honors and awards: Five battle stars for World War II
- Fate: Sold for scrapping 26 April 1948

General characteristics
- Class & type: LST-542-class tank landing ship
- Displacement: 1,625 long tons (1,651 t) light; 4,080 long tons (4,145 t) full (seagoing draft with 1,675-ton load
- Length: 328 ft (100 m)
- Beam: 50 ft (15 m)
- Draft: Unloaded 2 ft 4 in (0.71 m) forward; 7 ft 6 in (2.29 m) aft; Full load: 8 ft 2 in (2.49 m) forward; 14 ft 1 in (4.29 m) aft; Landing with 500-ton load: 3 ft 11 in (1.19 m) forward; 9 ft 10 in (3.00 m) aft
- Installed power: 1,800 horsepower (1.34 megawatts)
- Propulsion: Two 900-horsepower (0.67-megawatt) General Motors 12-567 diesel engines, two shafts, twin rudders
- Speed: 12 knots (22 km/h; 14 mph)
- Range: 24,000 nautical miles (44,448 kilometerss) at 9 knots while displacing 3,960 tons
- Boats & landing craft carried: 6 x LCVPs
- Capacity: 1,600-1,900 tons cargo depending on mission
- Troops: 14 officers, 131 enlisted men
- Complement: 9 officers, 120 enlisted men
- Armament: 2 × twin 40 mm gun mounts; 4 × single 40-millimeter gun mounts; 12 × 20 mm guns

USS LST-556 was a United States Navy LST-542-class tank landing ship in commission from 1944 to 1946.

== Construction and commissioning ==
LST-556 was laid down on 4 February 1944 at Evansville, Indiana, by the Missouri Valley Bridge and Iron Company. She was launched on 7 April 1944, sponsored by Mrs. James C. Bradshaw, and commissioned on 1 May 1944.

== Service history ==
During World War II, LST-556 was assigned to the Pacific Theater of Operations. She participated in the capture and occupation of the southern Palau Islands in September and October 1944. She then took part in the Philippines campaign, participating in the Leyte landings in October and November 1944, the landings at Ormoc Bay in December 1944, the landings at Mindoro in December 1944, and the landings at Zambales and Subic Bay in January 1945. She then participated in the assault on and occupation of Okinawa Gunto in April and May 1945.

Following the war, LST-556 returned to the United States.

== Decommissioning and disposal ==
LST-556 was decommissioned on 14 March 1946 and stricken from the Navy List on 12 April 1946. On 26 April 1948, she was sold to the Sun Shipbuilding and Drydock Company of Chester, Pennsylvania, for scrapping.

== Honors and awards ==
LST-556 earned five battle stars for her World War II service.
