= ARV Felipe Larrazábal =

ARV Felipe Larrazábal is the name of the following ships of the Venezuelan Navy, named for Felipe Larrazábal:

- ARV Felipe Larrazábal (1947) (R-11), ex-USS Auk (AM-38), a Lapwing-class minesweeper acquired in 1947, decommissioned in 1962
- ARV Felipe Larrazábal (1962) (R-11), ex-USS Tolowa, an Abnaki-class fleet ocean tug acquired in 1962, decommissioned in 1974
- ARV Felipe Larrazábal (R-21), ex-USS Utina, an Abnaki-class fleet ocean tug acquired in 1971
