= USS Munsee =

Tugboat of the United States Navy

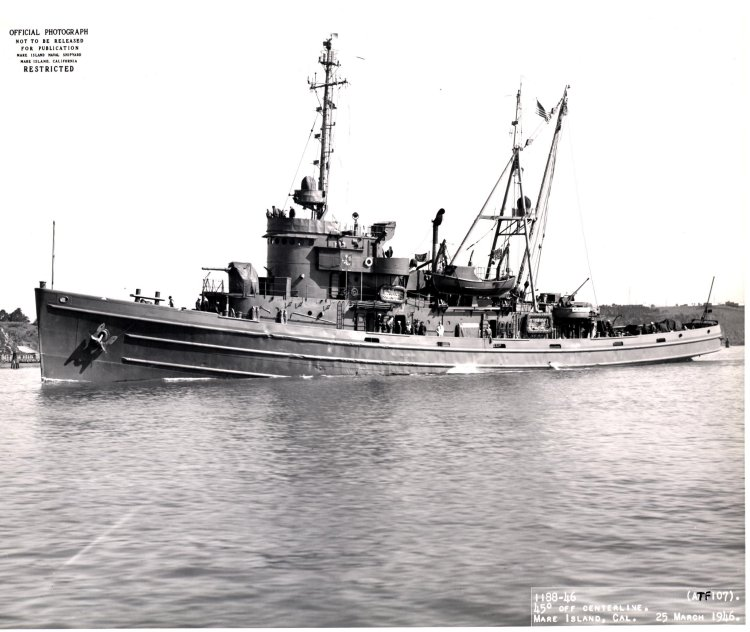
- USS Munsee

History

United States
- Name: USS Munsee
- Builder: United Engineering & Drydock Co., Alameda, California
- Laid down: 20 August 1942
- Launched: 21 January 1943
- Commissioned: 30 October 1943
- Decommissioned: 3 November 1969
- Stricken: 3 November 1969
- Fate: Sold into commercial service, 2 July 1970. Scrapped 1978.

General characteristics
- Class & type: Abnaki-class fleet ocean tug
- Displacement: 1,680 long tons (1,707 t)
- Length: 205 ft (62 m)
- Beam: 39 ft 3 in (11.96 m)
- Draft: 16 ft 10 in (5.13 m)
- Propulsion: Diesel-electric; 4 × Alco diesel main engines driving 4 × General Electric generators and 3 × General Motors 3-268A auxiliary services engines, single screw
- Speed: 16 knots (18 mph; 30 km/h)
- Complement: 85 officers & enlisted
- Armament: 1 × 3"/50 caliber gun; 2 × 40 mm guns

USS Munsee (AT/ATF-107) was an Abnaki-class fleet ocean tug. She is the only ship of the United States Navy to hold the name Munsee, which is the name of a subtribe of the Delaware Indians, still living in Wisconsin and Kansas.

Munsee was laid down 20 August 1942 by the United Engineering & Drydock Co., Alameda, California; launched 21 January 1943; sponsored by Mrs. Lloyd A. Davis; and commissioned 30 October 1943, Lieutenant John F. Pingley in command.

== Service history ==
=== World War II ===
After shakedown and brief duty from west coast ports, Munsee conducted towing operations between Hawaii and Midway and the Marshall Islands. As ATF-107, redesignated 15 May 1944, she proceeded, in August, to the Solomon Islands to prepare for the invasion of the Palaus. She arrived off Peleliu, 17 September, and screened transports during the landings. She then joined in the occupation of Ulithi, 23 September, and patrolled Naval Base Kossol Roads. When Canberra (CA-70) was damaged by an air attack off Formosa, 13 October, Munsee sailed to take her in tow. Rendezvousing 8 days later Munsee took over the tow from USS Wichita and put a salvage crew aboard Canberra. In the process of temporary repairs and pumping out flooded compartments Munsee's salvage officer, Ensign P.S. Criblet, died while diving in the cruiser's engine room. Pawnee (ATF-74) gave similar aid to Houston (CL-81), struck the day after Canberra. Still in range of land-based aircraft, the two cruisers drew heavy attacks, which Munsee and Pawnee helped to fight off as they towed the cruisers to safer waters. Relieved 21 October, she returned to the Palaus for salvage duties.

At Ulithi, 20 November, for repairs, Munsee aided in fighting fire on board Mississinewa (AO-59) when the oiler was hit by a Japanese kaiten. She maneuvered close enough to send a firefighting party aboard. After thirty minutes, they were forced off the oiler, returning to Munsee hand over hand on the mooring lines. Towing and salvage duty in the Palaus and at Ulithi continued. On 11 March 1945, she again fought fire in Ulithi Anchorage when Randolph (CV-15) was bombed. She next joined TG 50.8 for at-sea support of the Okinawa assault force. Arriving at Kerama Retto, 8 April, she underwent two enemy air attacks, before sailing to take Sigsbee (DD-502), damaged by enemy aircraft, in tow for Guam. Rejoining TG 50.8, she sailed with them through the violent typhoon of 5 June, during which Pittsburgh (CA-72) lost 104 feet of her bow. Munsee sailed in search of the missing section, and shortly reported having sighted it and taken it in tow. The unwieldy tow was safely brought to Guam, with Pakana (ATF-108) assisting in the final stage of the mission.

=== Post-war ===
The tug served in the Marianas through July and August; then, after hostilities ended, proceeded to Okinawa and Japan for salvage and diving operations. She opened 1946 in the Marshalls and operated between the central Pacific and the west coast until steaming to Bikini Atoll in June for "Operation Crossroads", tests conducted through the summer to determine the effects of atomic weapons on naval ships. For the next two decades the tug performed widely varied duties in the Pacific, towing assorted ships and craft from the South Pacific to the Aleutians, and from the California coast to the Asiatic mainland. The pace quickened during the Korean War in the early 1950s and again in the mid‑1960s when the United States entered into the Vietnam War.

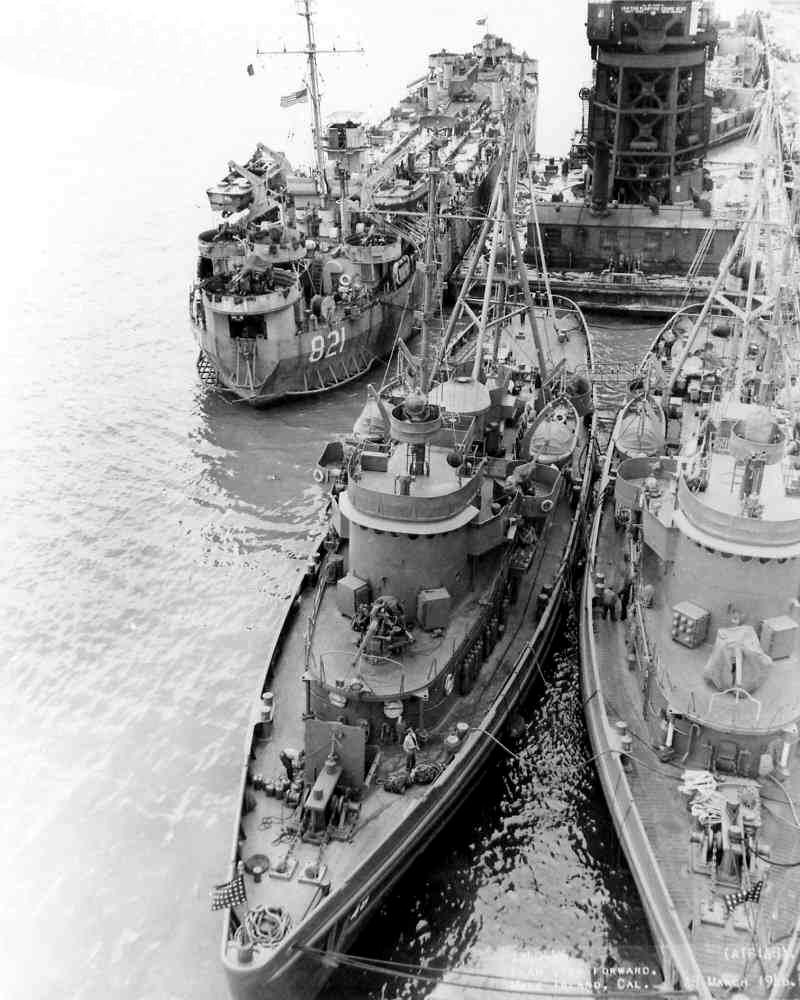
USS Munsee (ATF-107) sits alongside the Achomawi (ATF-148) at Mare Island Navy Yard, 28 March 1946. Aft are Harnett County (LST-821) and YD-33.

On 23 January 1957, a landing craft being used as a liberty boat in San Diego harbor collided with the Munsee while it was headed for shore. One seaman was missing and presumed drowned while three other sailors were rescued from the water by the tug and other nearby naval craft. The Navy said the landing craft was damaged, but not sunk or capsized.

On the morning of 10 July 1965, Munsee headed for Pratas Reef, 200 miles south of Hong Kong. There Frank Knox (DD-742) had grounded. First on the scene, Munsee remained for several days, helping to refloat the destroyer. On the 28th, she made a run to Cam Rahn Bay with barges in tow, and then towed Frank Knox from Taiwan to Japan for repairs. Munsee returned to San Diego 29 October 1965 and for the next year operated on the west coast. She sailed, 28 October 1966, for the Gulf of Alaska. Arriving at Adak, 5 November, she spent the next few months assisting disabled vessels in the Aleutians. She headed south again in February, arriving at San Diego on the 22nd. She operated along the west coast until 19 October, when she departed again for the Far East. After a stop at Pearl Harbor, Munsee reached Subic Bay 27 November. On 2 December she sailed for Vũng Tàu, Vietnam, to assist HCU‑1 in transferring equipment between lift craft. The veteran tug continued to operate in Southeast Asia, until returning to San Diego 28 May 1968. Late in the year she prepared to return to the North Pacific.

Munsee was decommissioned 3 November 1969. She was stricken from the Naval Vessel Register the same day. She was sold for commercial service to Ocean Service Corporation on 2 July 1970, who passed ownership to C Y Tung. She served under the name Island until 1978 when she was heavily damaged by a fire; the ship was scrapped shortly thereafter as the damage was too extensive to repair.
