= Hitchiti (disambiguation) =

Hitchiti was a Native American town in present-day Georgia.

Hitchiti may also refer to:

- Hitchiti language or Mikasuki, an endangered Muskogean language of southern Florida
- USS Hitchiti, a 1944 Abnaki-class tugboat
