= USS Nipmuc =

Tugboat of the United States Navy

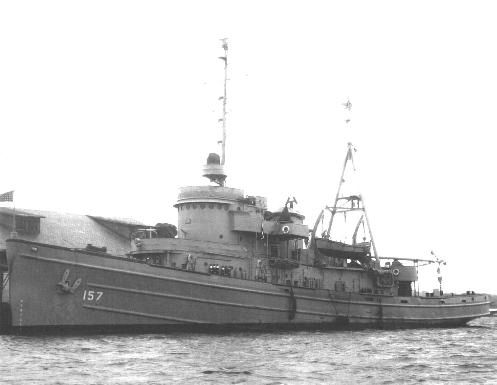
- USS Nipmuc, c. 1948

History

United States
- Name: Nipmuc
- Namesake: Nipmuc people
- Builder: Charleston Shipbuilding and Dry Dock Co.
- Laid down: 2 December 1944
- Launched: 12 April 1945
- Commissioned: 8 July 1945
- Decommissioned: unknown
- Stricken: 1 September 1978
- Fate: Sold, to Venezuela under the Security Assistance Program, 1 September 1978

Venezuela
- Name: Antonio Picardi (R-22)
- Acquired: 1 September 1978
- Out of service: 1982
- Fate: Ran aground and wrecked, 12 April 1982

General characteristics
- Class & type: Abnaki-class fleet ocean tug
- Displacement: 1,240 long tons (1,260 t)
- Length: 205 ft (62 m)
- Beam: 38 ft 6 in (11.73 m)
- Draft: 15 ft 4 in (4.67 m)
- Speed: 16.5 knots (19.0 mph; 30.6 km/h)
- Complement: 85
- Armament: 1 × 3 in (76 mm) gun; 2 × 20 mm guns

Service record
- Part of: Pacific Fleet
- Operations: World War II

USS Nipmuc (ATF-157) was an Abnaki-class of fleet ocean tug that served in World War II. The tug was sold to Venezuela in 1978.
