= Abnaki-class tugboat =

1943 US Navy fleet ocean tugs

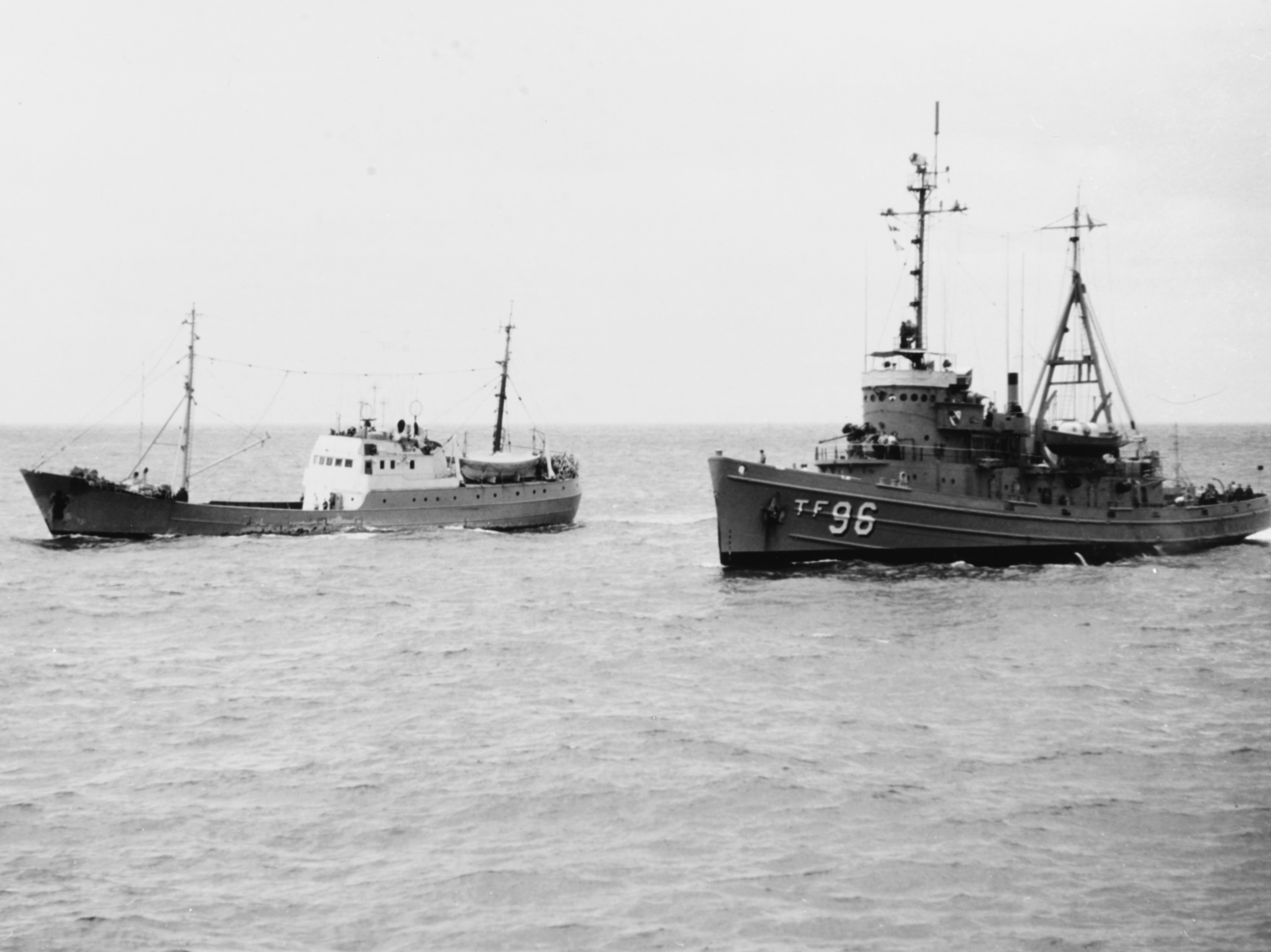
- USS Abnaki (right), alongside a Soviet intelligence ship

Class overview
- Name: Abnaki class
- Operators: United States Navy (Formerly); Foreign navies (Currently)
- Preceded by: Cherokee class
- Succeeded by: Powhatan class
- Built: 1942–1945
- In commission: 1943–present
- Completed: 35
- Active: 4
- Lost: 2
- Retired: 31
- Preserved: 1

General characteristics
- Type: Ocean fleet tug
- Displacement: 1,589 tons
- Length: 205 ft 0 in (62.48 m)
- Beam: 38 ft 6 in (11.73 m)
- Draft: 15 ft 4 in (4.67 m)
- Propulsion: 4 × General Motors 12-278A diesel main engines; 4 × General Electric generators; 3 × General Motors 3-268A auxiliary services engines; Single screw; 3,600 shp (2,700 kW)
- Speed: 16.5 knots (30.6 km/h)
- Range: 6000 nautical miles (11,000 km) at 16 knots 15,000 nautical miles (28,000 km) at 8 knots
- Complement: 85
- Armament: 1 × 3 in (76 mm) gun; 2 × 40 mm (1.6 in) guns; 4 × 20 mm (0.79 in) cannons

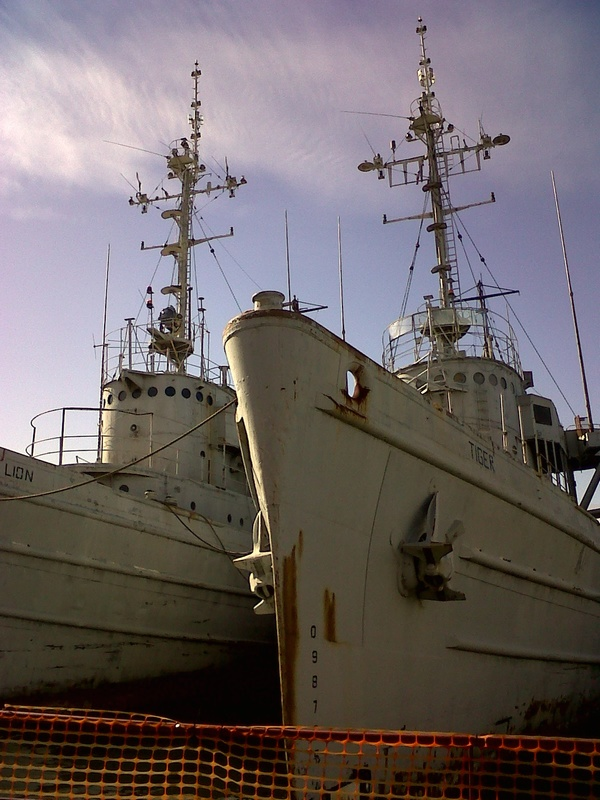
USS Moctobi (Lion) and USS Quapaw (Tiger) in 2011

The Abnaki-class tug is a class of United States Navy fleet ocean tugs which began construction in November 1942. Comprising 35 oceangoing tugboats, the class was constructed in response to the needs of World War II, but members of the class served in the Korean War and Vietnam War as well. The United States Navy no longer has any ships of this class in active duty.

== Ships ==
Ship name	Hull number	Builder	Comm.	Decomm.	Fate
Abnaki	ATF-96	Charleston Shipbuilding and Drydock Company	25 Nov 1943	30 Sep 1978	Transferred to Mexico; currently active
Alsea	ATF-97	Charleston Shipbuilding and Drydock Company	13 Dec 1943	15 Apr 1955	Sold for scrap, 20 June 1996
Arikara	ATF-98	Charleston Shipbuilding and Drydock Company	5 Jan 1944	1 Jul 1971	Transferred to Chile, 1 July 1971; Sunk as target, 1992
Chetco	ATF-99	Charleston Shipbuilding and Drydock Company	29 May 1944	29 Jun 1970	Converted to submarine rescue ship during construction; renamed USS Penguin (ASR-12).
Chowanoc	ATF-100	Charleston Shipbuilding and Drydock Company	21 Feb 1944	1 Oct 1971	Transferred to Ecuador, 1 October 1977; currently active
Cocopa	ATF-101	Charleston Shipbuilding and Drydock Company	25 Mar 1944	30 Sep 1978	Transferred to Mexico, 30 September 1978; currently active
Hidatsa	ATF-102	Charleston Shipbuilding and Drydock Company	25 Apr 1944	5 May 1948	Transferred to Colombia, 1 March 1979; fate unknown
Hitchiti	ATF-103	Charleston Shipbuilding and Drydock Company	27 May 1944	30 Sep 1979	Transferred to Mexico, 1 September 1976; Decommissioned 16 June 2021 & awaiting disposal in Colima.
Jicarilla	ATF-104	Charleston Shipbuilding and Drydock Company	26 Jun 1944	14 Jun 1950	Transferred to Colombia, 1 March 1979; sunk as artificial reef 2 September 2004
Moctobi	ATF-105	Charleston Shipbuilding and Drydock Company	25 Jul 1944	30 Sep 1985	Sold to the Northeast Wisconsin Railroad Transportation Commission, 29 December 1997; scrapped 2012
Molala	ATF-106	United Engineering Company	29 Sep 1943	1 Aug 1978	Transferred to Mexico, 1 August 1978; currently active
Munsee	ATF-107	United Engineering Company	30 Oct 1943	3 Nov 1969	Sold into commercial service, 2 July 1970; scrapped 1978.
Pakana	ATF-108	United Engineering Company	17 Dec 1945	30 Apr 1948	Sunk as a target, 27 May 1975
Potawatomi	ATF-109	United Engineering Company	12 Feb 1944	28 Apr 1948	Transferred to Chile February 1963; sunk, 15 August 1965
Quapaw	ATF-110	United Engineering Company	6 May 1944	30 Aug 1985	Sank as a result of neglect, 11 December 2011; scrapped 2012
Sarsi	ATF-111	United Engineering Company	24 Jun 1944	n/a	Sunk, 27 August 1952
Serrano	ATF-112	United Engineering Company	22 Sep 1944	2 Jan 1970	Sold for scrap, 2 November 1971
Takelma	ATF-113	United Engineering Company	3 Aug 1944	28 Jan 1992	Transferred to Argentina as Suboficial Castillo, 30 September 1993; auctioned off 2022
Tawakoni	ATF-114	United Engineering Company	15 Sep 1944	1978	Transferred to Taiwan, 1 June 1978; decommissioned 1 November 2020 and sunk as a target on 15 August 2023.
Tenino	ATF-115	United Engineering Company	18 Nov 1944	17 May 1947	Sunk as a target, 18 Aug 1986
Tolowa	ATF-116	United Engineering Company	26 Dec 1944	27 Jan 1947	Transferred to Venezuela, 1 February 1962, decommissioned 1974
Wateree	ATF-117	United Engineering Company	17 Feb 1945	n/a	Sunk, 9 October 1945
Wenatchee	ATF-118	United Engineering Company	24 Mar 1945	19 Mar 1947	Sold to Taiwan in 1992 for use as a parts hulk, hull as target ship.
Achomawi	ATF-148	Charleston Shipbuilding and Drydock Company	11 Nov 1944	10 Jun 1947	Transferred to Taiwan, 1991; retired on July 1st, 2025
Atakapa	ATF-149	Charleston Shipbuilding and Drydock Company	8 Dec 1944	1 Jul 1974	Sunk as a target, 25 August 2000
Cahuilla	ATF-152	Charleston Shipbuilding and Drydock Company	10 Mar 1945	27 Jun 1947	Transferred to Argentina, 9 July 1961; museum ship
Chimariko	ATF-154	Charleston Shipbuilding and Drydock Company	28 Apr 1945	30 Oct 1946	Sunk as a target, 27 August 1978
Cusabo	ATF-155	Charleston Shipbuilding and Drydock Company	19 May 1945	3 Dec 1946	Transferred to Ecuador, 30 August 1978; stricken 1999
Luiseno	ATF-156	Charleston Shipbuilding and Drydock Company	16 Jun 1945	1 Jul 1975	Transferred to Argentina, 1 July 1975; sunk in military exercise in 2024
Nimpuc	ATF-157	Charleston Shipbuilding and Drydock Company	8 Jul 1945	n/a	Transferred to Venezuela, 1 September 1978; fate unknown
Mosopelea	ATF-158	Charleston Shipbuilding and Drydock Company	28 Jul 1945	n/a	Sunk as a target, 27 October 1999
Paiute	ATF-159	Charleston Shipbuilding and Drydock Company	27 Aug 1945	7 Aug 1992	Scrapped 2003
Papago	ATF-160	Charleston Shipbuilding and Drydock Company	3 Oct 1945	28 Jul 1992	Decommissioned 28 July 1992, as of 2010 part of the Naval mothball fleet located in Philadelphia, Pennsylvania.^{[3]}
Salinan	ATF-161	Charleston Shipbuilding and Drydock Company	9 Nov 1945	1 Sep 1978	Transferred to Venezuela, 1 September 1978; fate unknown
Shakori	ATF-162	Charleston Shipbuilding and Drydock Company	20 Dec 1945	29 Feb 1980	Transferred to Taiwan, 1 October 1980; decommissioned 1 August 2023 after being damaged in a January 2022 fire.
Utina	ATF-163	Charleston Shipbuilding and Drydock Company	30 Jan 1946	3 Sep 1971	Transferred to Venezuela, 1 December 1977; fate unknown

== See also ==
- Sotoyomo-class fleet tug
- Type V ship – Tugs
- List of auxiliaries of the United States Navy
