= USS Papago =

Tugboat of the United States Navy

USS Papago (ATF-160)
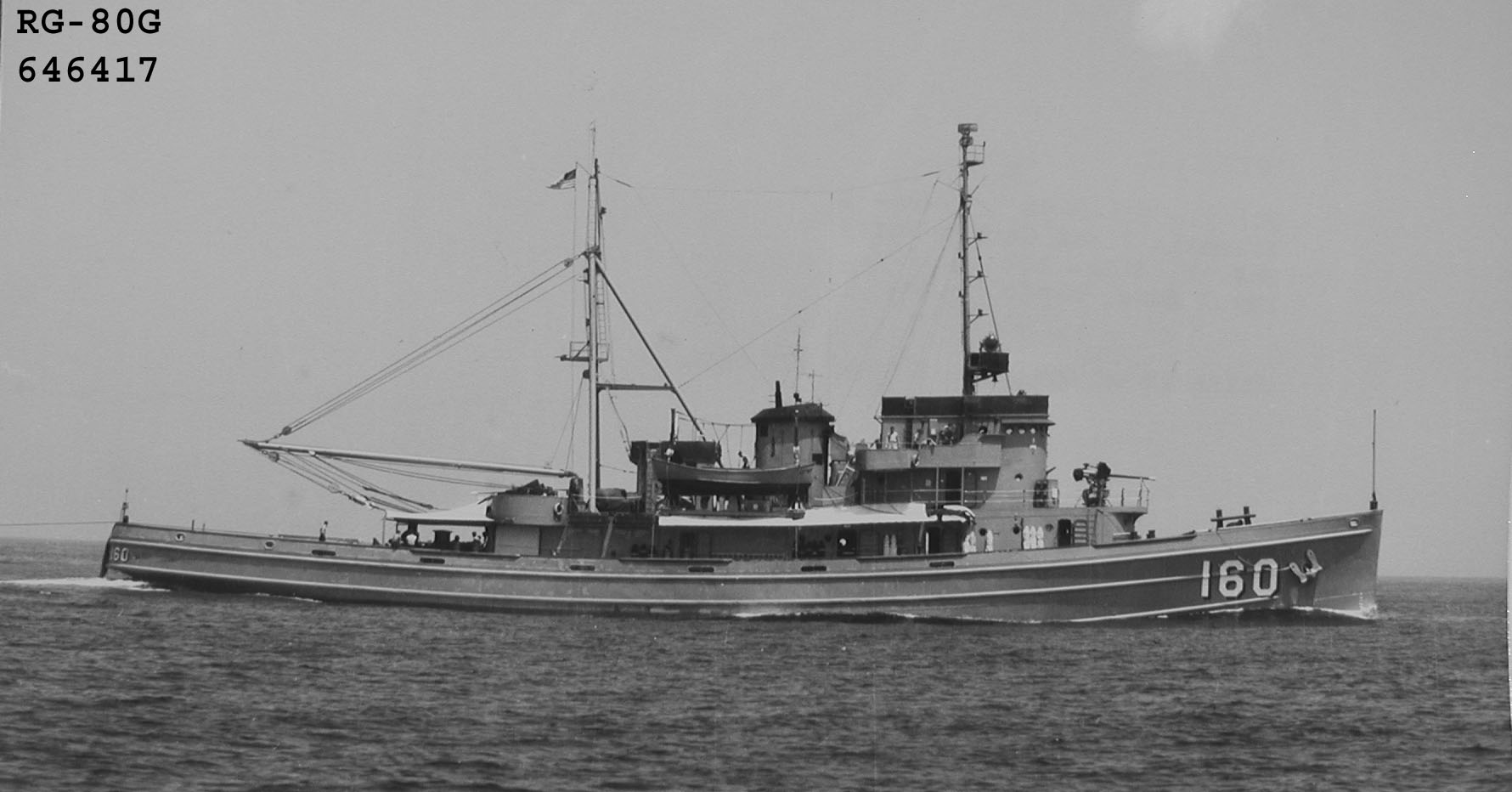
- USS Papago (ATF-160) c. 1954

History

United States
- Builder: Charleston Shipbuilding and Drydock Company
- Laid down: 19 March 1945
- Launched: 21 June 1945
- Sponsored by: Mrs. William Thomas Johnston
- Commissioned: 3 October 1945
- Decommissioned: 28 July 1992
- Stricken: 23 February 1995
- Honours and awards: Meritorious Unit Commendation; Navy Expeditionary Medal; American Campaign Medal; World War II Victory Medal; National Defense Service Medal; Armed Forces Expeditionary Medal
- Status: Inactive Fleet - Philadelphia, PA

General characteristics
- Class & type: Abnaki-class fleet ocean tug
- Displacement: 1,205 tons (light), 1,646 tons (full)
- Length: 205 ft (62 m)
- Beam: 38 ft 6 in (11.73 m)
- Draft: 15 ft 6 in (4.72 m)
- Propulsion: Diesel-electric, four General Motors 12-278A diesel main engines driving four General Electric generators and three General Motors 3-268A auxiliary services engines, single screw
- Speed: 16.5 knots (30.6 km/h; 19.0 mph)
- Complement: 8 officers, 68 enlisted men
- Armament: One single 3 in (76 mm) gun mount, two twin-40 mm gun mounts, two single 20 mm guns

USS Papago (ATF-160) was an Abnaki-class fleet ocean tug built for the United States Navy during World War II, and named for the American Indian tribe of the Piman family that formerly lived south and southeast of the Gila River in Arizona and the Mexican state of Sonora.

== Construction history ==
Papago was laid down at Charleston, South Carolina by the Charleston Shipbuilding and Drydock Company on 19 March 1945. She was launched on 21 June 1945, with Mrs. William Thomas Johnston as her sponsor. Papago was commissioned into the United States Navy on 3 October 1945.

== Operational history ==
=== Post-shakedown operations ===
Following shakedown, Papago reported to the Naval Operating Base in Newport, Rhode Island, on 17 November 1945 and conducted training operations and movements to assist various vessels in distress for the remainder of that year.

=== Major towing and salvage operations ===
1946–1950

After duty as a stand-by tug in Bermuda, Papago towed YD–171, the world's largest self-propelled Floating crane at the time, from Bremerhaven, Germany to Cristóbal, Colón, in the Panama Canal Zone, from 14 August to 20 September 1946.

Papago engaged in general towing, upkeep, and material maintenance for several months after which she made towing voyages in 1949 from the Panama Canal Zone to Naval Station Norfolk; from Norfolk to Newport; and from Boston to Bayonne, New Jersey.

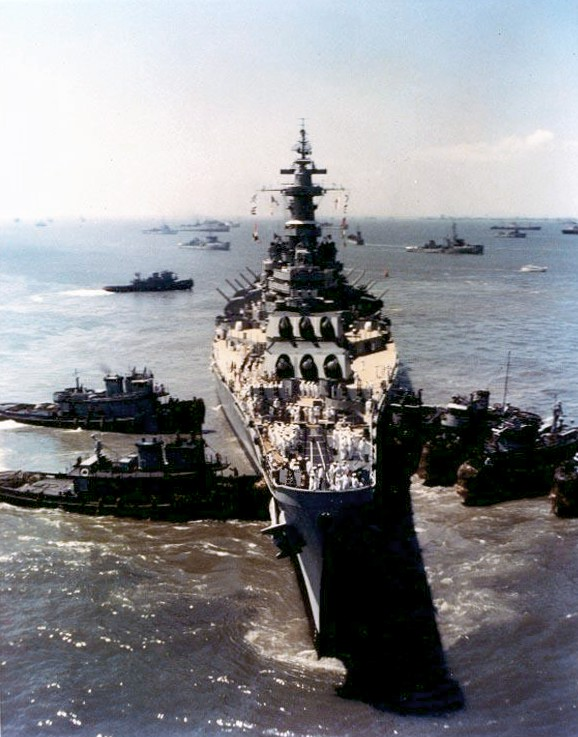
USS Missouri (BB-63) grounding (1950)

From 30 January to 7 February 1950, Papago was involved in re-floating the battleship USS Missouri (BB-63), which had run aground in Hampton Roads on 17 January. She then moved decommissioned destroyer escorts to Philadelphia for the transfer to France under the Military Defense Assistance Program between 10 and 14 May 1950.

1961–1962

Papago later towed the decommissioned heavy cruiser Des Moines (CA-134) from Boston to Philadelphia between 17 and 21 July 1961. Papago was subsequently engaged in the salvaging and re-floating operation involving the decommissioned destroyer Monssen (DD-798), which had grounded at Beach Haven, New Jersey, while being towed by another vessel during a severe storm on 6 March 1962 between 6 March to 22 April. For this effort, Papago received a citation from Admiral Robert L. Dennison, the Commander-in-Chef U.S. Atlantic Fleet (CINCLANTFLT).

1968

The first half of 1968 was marked by four and a half months of almost continuous steaming in coastal and Caribbean waters, followed in the fall by participation in communications experiments in the Virginia Capes area.

Papago in January 1968 was tasked with the towing of the incomplete nuclear submarine Pogy (SSN-647) from Philadelphia to Mississippi. Off the coast of Florida the tow line parted. Papago collided with Pogy while attempting to reattach the tow line in heavy seas and suffered hull damage; the attempt had to be abandoned. Pogy would drift for three days until other vessels were able to restart the tow.

Papago received the Award of Excellence in Engineering for fiscal year 1968.

1982

On 10 November, Papago towed the newly decommissioned destroyer Barry (DD-933) to the Naval Inactive Ship Maintenance Facility at the Philadelphia Naval Shipyard, reaching that facility on 12 March.

=== Naval exercises & operations ===
Papago did not participate in the Korean War, while she did perform towing operations in coastal waters and the Caribbean. Papago did participate in refresher training and towed gunnery targets in the Guantanamo Bay area from 11 March to 16 July 1957. She participated in NATO's Operation Strikeback, deploying to Scotland from 14 to 28 September 1957. Papago also participated in NASA's crewed space flight program as a naval support vessel for the following missions:

- Mercury Project – 2 to 4 December 1959
- Gemini IX – 3 June 1966

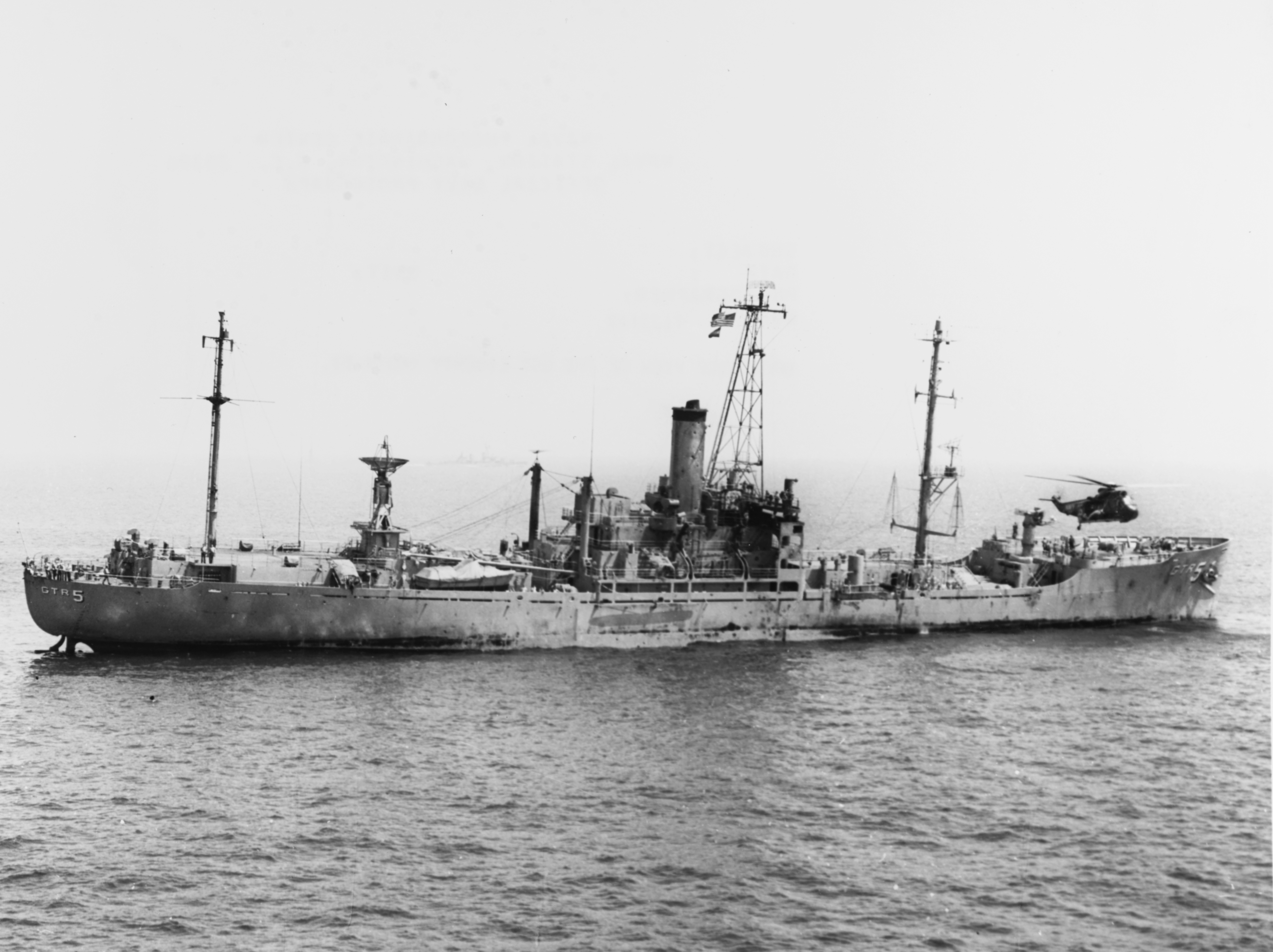
USS Liberty incident (1967)

Papago participated in quarantine operations during the Cuban Missile Crisis from 10 October to 14 November 1962. In early 1963, she provided services for Operation Springboard in the Caribbean Sea and spent much of the remainder of 1963 and 1964 in the Guantanamo Bay and Virginia Capes areas. Papago later joined Commander Task Group 124.3 (CTG 124.3) in May 1965 for duty during the crisis in the Dominican Republic, then steamed in the North Atlantic as part of Commander Service Division 81 (ComServDiv 81).

While serving as a rescue, salvage, and towing ship for the U.S. Sixth Fleet in 1967, Papago provided escort and communication support to the stricken USS Liberty (AGTR-5) which had been attacked by Israeli forces during the Six-Day War. Papago ended 1968 undergoing an extensive overhaul at Newport News.

Starting 28 June 1985, Papago participated in anti-drug patrols in the Caribbean Sea as part of Joint Task Force 4 (JTF-4).

== Awards & citations ==
Papago received the following awards and citations during her commission as a unit of the United States Navy:

- Meritorious Unit Commendation
- Navy Battle "E" Ribbon (2)
- Navy Expeditionary Medal (3-Cuba)
- American Campaign Medal
- World War II Victory Medal
- National Defense Service Medal (2)
- Armed Forces Expeditionary Medal (1-Cuba, 1-Dominican Republic)

== Disposal ==
Papago was decommissioned on 28 July 1992 and was struck from the Naval Registry on 14 February 1995. Following congressional approval in 1996 for transfer to the Northeast Wisconsin Railroad Transportation Commission, she was handed over on 29 December 1997 to the Ontonagon County Economic Development Corporation on behalf of the Escanaba and Lake Superior Railroad, along with five other obsolete sister tugs. They were intended for a new trans-Lake Superior freight car barge service between Ontonagon and Thunder Bay, Ontario, though it has been suggested that the company sought the tug's four General Motors engines (24 in all) to use in their locomotives. The project was abandoned in October 1999, shortly before title would have passed to the railroad company. Papago remained in lay-up between 1997 and 1999 and, as of June 2010, was still part of the Naval mothball fleet located in Philadelphia, Pennsylvania.
