= USS Shakori =

Abnaki-class tugboat

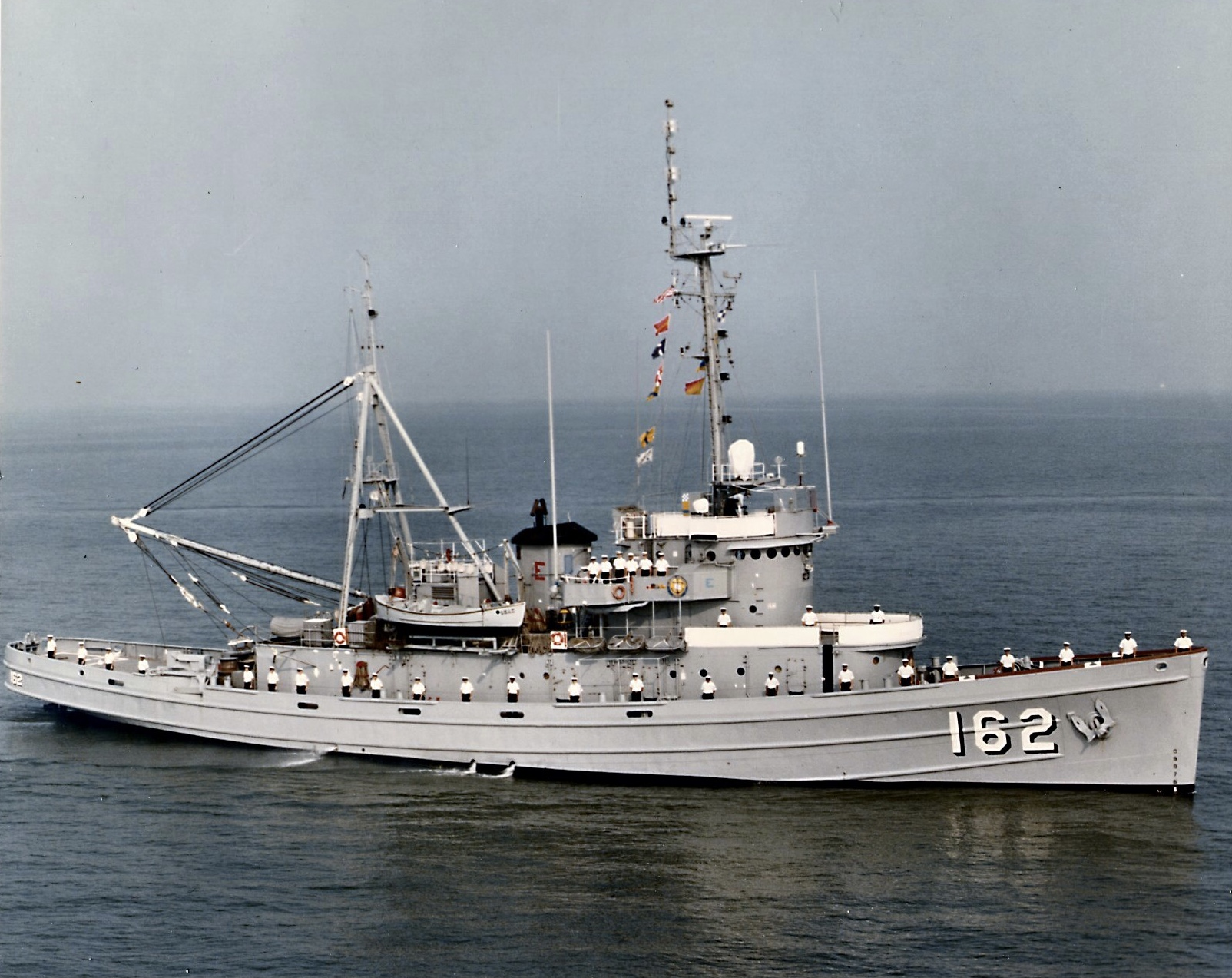
- USS Shakori

History

United States
- Name: Shakori
- Namesake: Shakori
- Builder: Charleston Shipbuilding & Drydock Co.
- Laid down: 9 May 1945
- Launched: 9 August 1945
- Commissioned: 20 December 1945
- Decommissioned: 29 February 1980
- Identification: Callsign: NQDO; Hull number: ATF-162
- Honours and awards: See Awards
- Fate: Sold to Republic of China, 1 October 1980

Republic of China
- Name: Da Tai (大台)
- Acquired: 1 October 1980
- Commissioned: 15 December 1980
- Decommissioned: 1 August 2023
- Home port: Keelung
- Identification: Pennant number: ATF-563
- Fate: Sunk as target, 2024

General characteristics
- Class & type: Abnaki-class tugboat
- Displacement: 1,589 t (1,564 long tons), standard; 1,675 t (1,649 long tons), full
- Length: 205 ft 0 in (62.48 m)
- Beam: 38 ft 6 in (11.73 m)
- Draft: 15 ft 4 in (4.67 m)
- Installed power: 1 × shaft; 3,600 shp (2,700 kW)
- Propulsion: 4 × General Motors 12-278A diesel engines; 4 × General Electric generators; 3 × General Motors 3-268A auxiliary services engines
- Speed: 16.5 knots (30.6 km/h; 19.0 mph)
- Range: 15,000 nmi (28,000 km; 17,000 mi) at 8 knots (15 km/h; 9.2 mph)
- Complement: 85 officers and enlisted
- Sensors & processing systems: AN/SPS-5B surface-search radar
- Armament: 1 × single 3"/50 caliber gun; 2 × twin Bofors 40 mm guns; 2 × single Oerlikon 20 mm cannons

USS Shakori (ATF-162) is an Abnaki-class tugboat that saw service during the World War II and Cold War. She was later sold to Republic of China (Taiwan) as ROCS Da Tai (ATF-563). Her namesake was a small Indian tribe which originally inhabited an area near the present site of Durham, North Carolina. She was decommissioned from Taiwanese service in 2023 and sunk as a target ship in 2024.

== Design and description ==
The ship is displaced 1,589 tonnes (1,564 long tons) at standard load and 1,675 tonnes (1,649 long tons) at deep load The ships measured 205 feet (62.5 m) long overall with a beam of 38 feet 6 inches (11.7 m). They had a draft of 15 feet 4 inches (4.7 m). The ships' complement consisted of 85 officers and ratings.

The ships had two General Motors 12-278A diesel engines, one shaft. The engines produced a total of 3,600 shaft horsepower (2,700 kW) and gave a maximum speed of 16.5 knots (30.6 km/h; 19.0 mph). They carried a maximum of 10 tonnes (10 long tons) of fuel oil that gave them a range of 15,000 nmi (28,000 km; 17,000 mi) at 8 knots (15 km/h; 9.2 mph).

The Abnaki class was armed with a 3"/50 caliber gun anti-aircraft gun, two single-mount Oerlikon 20 mm cannon and two twin-gun mounts for Bofors 40 mm gun.

== Construction and career ==
The ship was built at the Charleston Shipbuilding & Drydock Co. at Charleston, South Carolina. She was laid down on 9 May 1945 and launched on 9 August 1945. The ship was commissioned on 20 December 1945.

=== Service in the United States Navy ===
Since then, the major portion of Shakori's long naval career has been spent in the Atlantic Ocean and in the Caribbean Sea. The tug has performed towing services all along the Atlantic seaboard and has often been called upon to tow targets for naval gunnery exercises.

On several occasions, Shakori has departed from her normal routine. In August 1960, the ship accompanied USS Little Rock (CLG-4) off Virginia to observe and record testing of Little Rock's new Talos missile system. In October and November 1962, during the Cuban missile crisis, she assisted in the evacuation of dependents from Guantanamo Bay by transporting clothes to the evacuees on the high seas. Following that, she spent three weeks at Miami, Florida, as the crisis wore on to its conclusion. The second and third departures from routine came in 1966 and 1967. In 1966, the tug circumnavigated the globe, completing the Navy's second-longest tow, 11,000 miles, en route. In 1967, after returning to Little Creek, Virginia, for overhaul and training, she deployed to the Mediterranean for almost six months on 18 January.

On 3 June 1967, Shakori returned to Little Creek, and resumed her Atlantic-Caribbean towing routine. This she has continued through 1974 and, as of 31 July, was in-port at Little Creek.

Service in the late 1970s included trans-Atlantic tows of a floating drydock section from Charleston, SC, to Holy Loch, Scotland, and of a floating pier from Charleston to Southampton, UK. In the fall of 1976, Shakori assisted with recovery of an F-14 Tomcat and detached missile that had accidentally fallen off the flight deck of USS John F. Kennedy (CV-67) north of Scotland. The Navy Unit Commendation was awarded for that mission.

=== Service in the Republic of China Navy ===
The ship was decommissioned on 29 December 1980 and later sold to the Republic of China as ROCS Da Tai (ATF-563). She was commissioned later that year on the 15 December.

At about 4 pm, 10 January 2022, the Keelung City Fire Department received a notification from the public that a large amount of smoke was coming from the smokestack of the Da Tai ship docked at the West 1 pier of Keelung Port; the fire department immediately dispatched fire fighting vehicles. The fire had been extinguished by military personnel on arrival, and no one was injured. According to reports, the fire started due to severe carbon deposits in kitchen chimney.

On August 1, 2023, Da Tai ship was officially retired at Kaohsiung Xinbin Pier.

On August 23, 2024, Da Tai ship was used as a target ship and was sunk by an anti-ship missile in the waters east of Taiwan.

ROCS Da Tai (ATF-563)

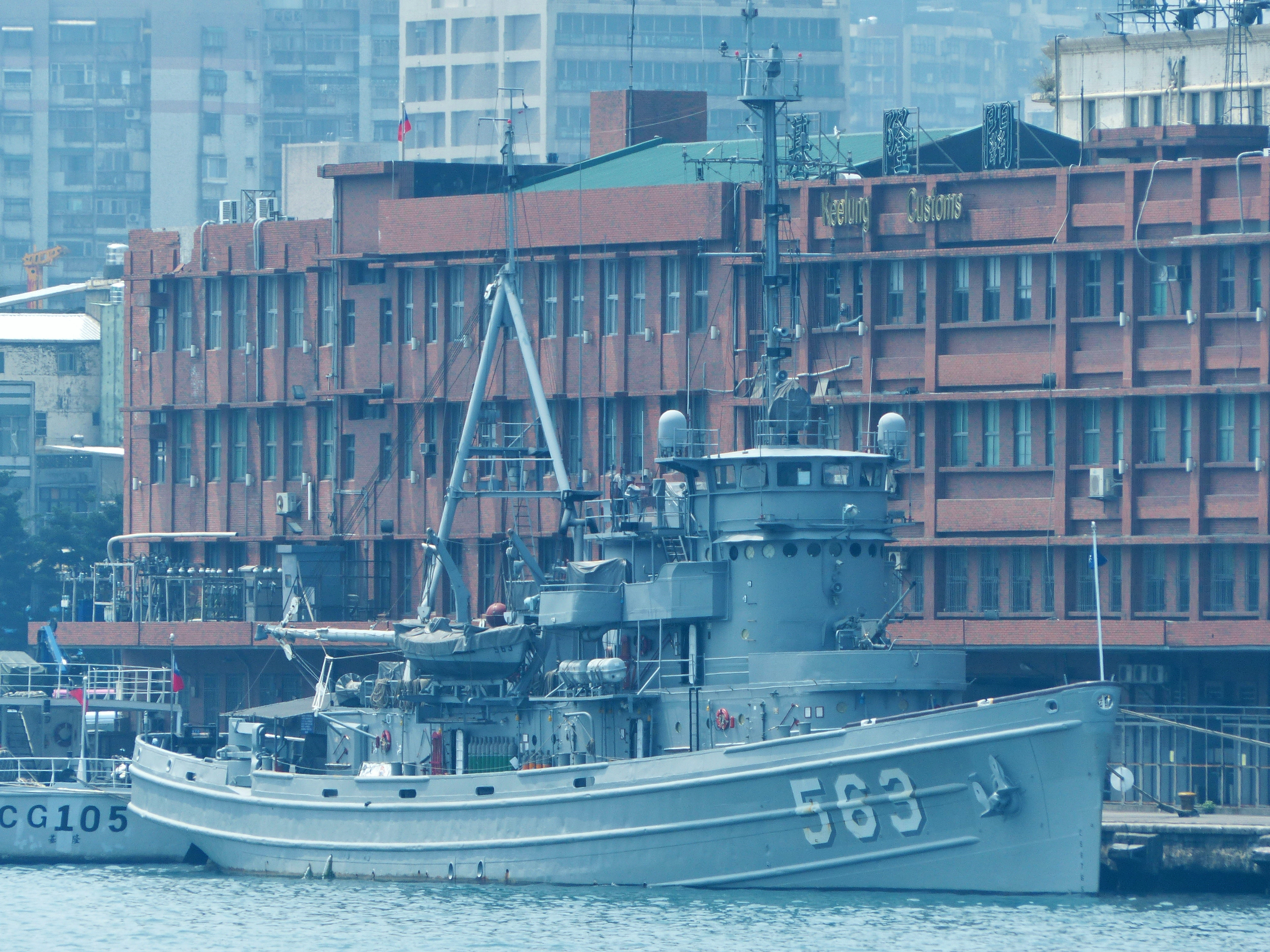
Da Tai on 24 March 2014

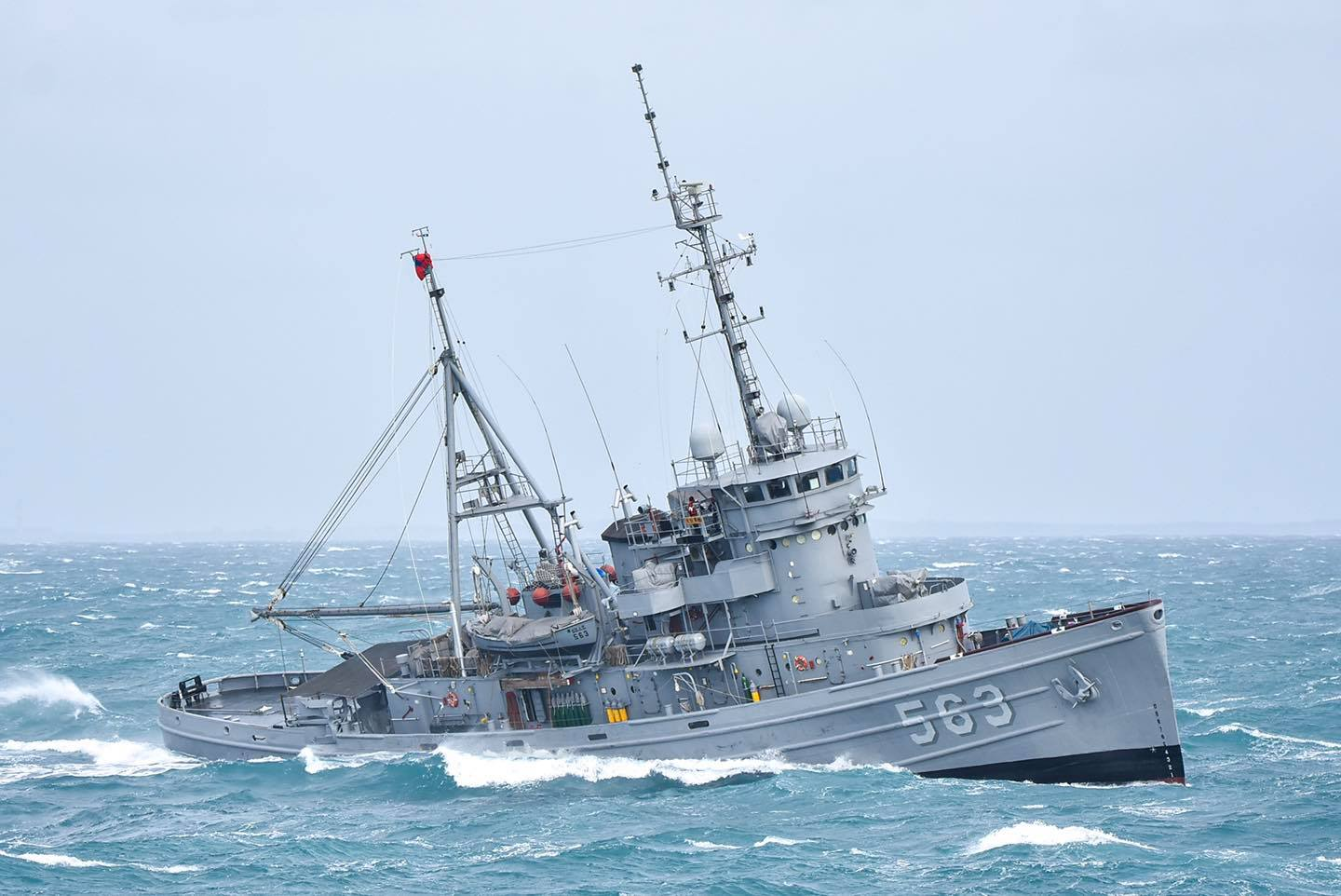
Da Tai in a storm

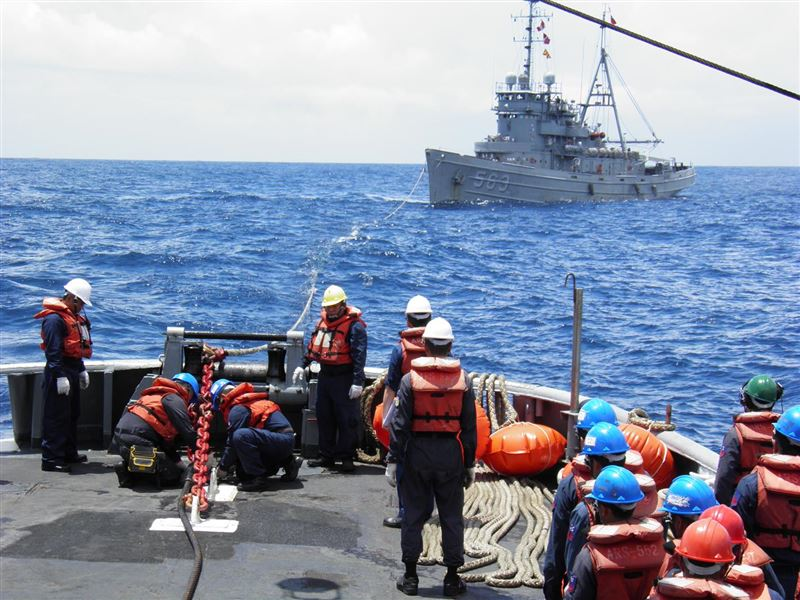
Da Tai conducts towing exercise

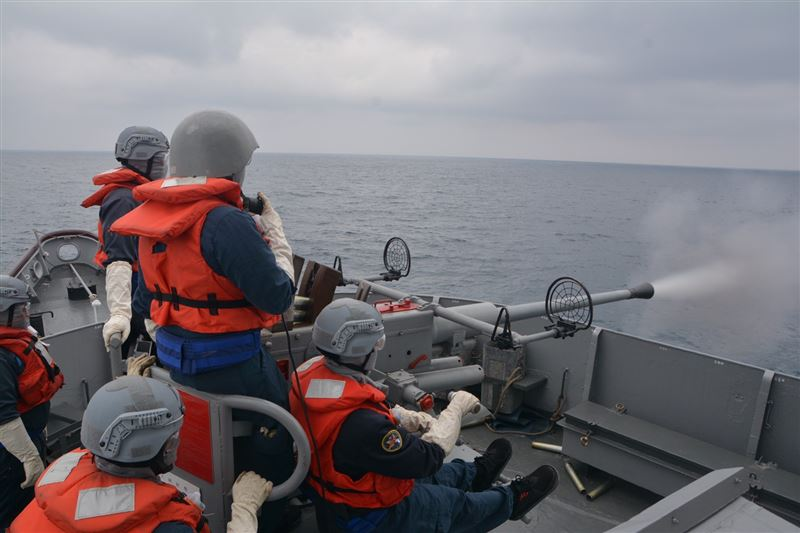
Da Tai gun shooting training

== Awards ==
- Navy Unit Commendation
- Navy Meritorious Unit Commendation
- Navy Expeditionary Medal (5 awards)
- American Campaign Medal
- World War II Victory Medal
- National Defense Service Medal (2 awards)
- Armed Forces Expeditionary Medal (2 awards)
- Vietnam Service Medal (1 award)
- Republic of Vietnam Campaign Medal
