= USS Paiute =

Tugboat of the United States Navy

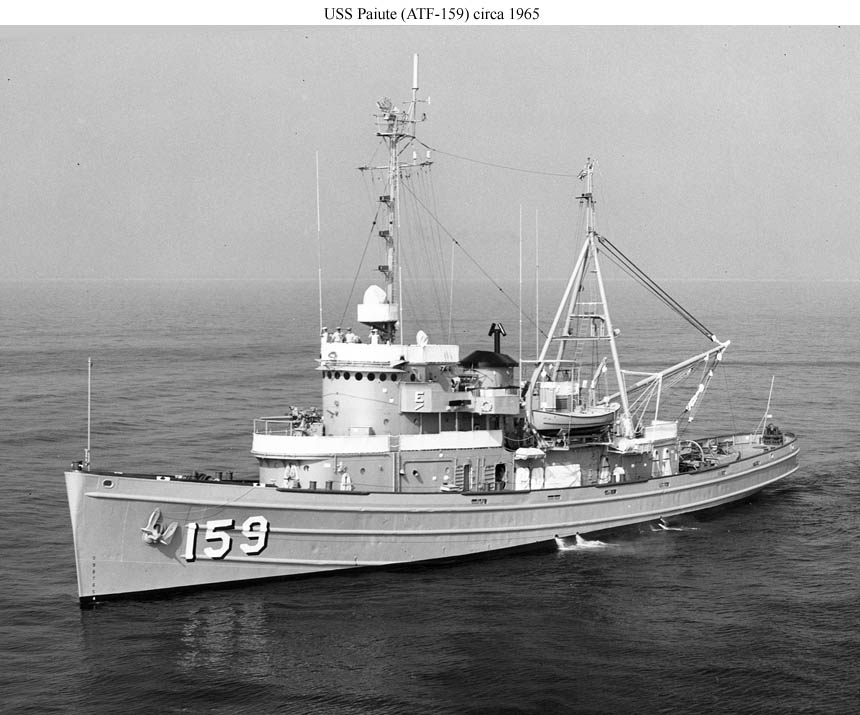
- Paiute in July 1965

History

United States
- Name: USS Paiute
- Namesake: The Corn Creek Indian tribe of Southwestern Utah
- Builder: Charleston Shipbuilding and Dry Dock Co.
- Laid down: 27 February 1945
- Decommissioned: 7 August 1992
- Nickname(s): Pukey P
- Fate: Scrapped, 2003

General characteristics
- Class & type: Abnaki-class tug
- Displacement: 4,200 tons
- Length: 205 feet
- Beam: 39 feet
- Draft: 17 feet
- Propulsion: four General Motors 12-278A diesel main engines driving four General Electric generators
- Speed: 16 knots
- Complement: 8 officers, 68 enlisted
- Armament: one single 3"/50 dual-purpose gun mount, two twin 40 mm AA gun mounts, two single 20 mm AA gun mounts

USS Paiute (ATF-159) was an Abnaki-class tug of the United States Navy during World War II, the Korean War, Vietnam War, and Persian Gulf War. She served a total of 44 years before being scrapped.

== Ship history ==
After her commissioning in August 1945, Paiute was assigned salvage, towing and logistics duties throughout the North Atlantic Ocean, and operated from her home port at Norfolk, Virginia, into 1953. In 1948, she towed USS Texas (BB-35) to Galveston, Texas. In September 1953, Paiute's home port was changed to Balboa, Canal Zone, where she carried out salvage operations and provided services to the fleet under the operational control of Commander Panama Sector, Caribbean Sea Frontier. Here she also operated the Diving School for second class divers at the Rodman Naval Station, Canal Zone. She became the only ship of her class to display a Golden "E" on her gun mount for five consecutive years of outstanding accuracy. Paiute underwent a Line-crossing ceremony on 11 November 1955.

=== Vietnam War ===
During the Cuban Missile Crisis of 1962, Paiute carried out patrol assignments, and following the isolation of the Guantanamo naval base by the Castro Government, she supplied much needed water by towing water barges from the States, until a desalinization plant was installed and operational.

In 1965, she delivered fuel barges to the Dominican Republic during the hot political crisis there. She was on Prime Recovery Station One during the Gemini 6 and 7 crewed space flights, and for Gemini 8 in 1966. Paiute moved to the New England area to provide services through 1967, returning to Guantanamo at the year's end. On 19 November, Paiute underwent another Line-crossing ceremony.

During 1968, she participated in several major salvage operations and fleet exercises. Paiute was called in January 1968 to assist the Pogy (SSN-647) after the incomplete nuclear submarine had become adrift off the coast of Florida while under tow from Philadelphia to Mississippi. Paiute was able to attach a tow line to Pogy in heavy seas but it parted less than 18 hours later; the attempt had to be taken up by other vessels. In the fall, she was again on recovery station for the Apollo 7 space shot. During February 1969, Paiute was awaiting splashdown of Apollo 9.

=== Post-War ===
In 1982, Paiute towed the USS Iowa from the Philadelphia Navy Yard to Avondale Shipyard for her reactivation into naval service. On 23 August 1985, Paiute was decommissioned at Naval Station Mayport, Florida. She was later recommissioned on 30 September 1988.

International radio call sign of USS Paiute
November	Zulu	November	Golf

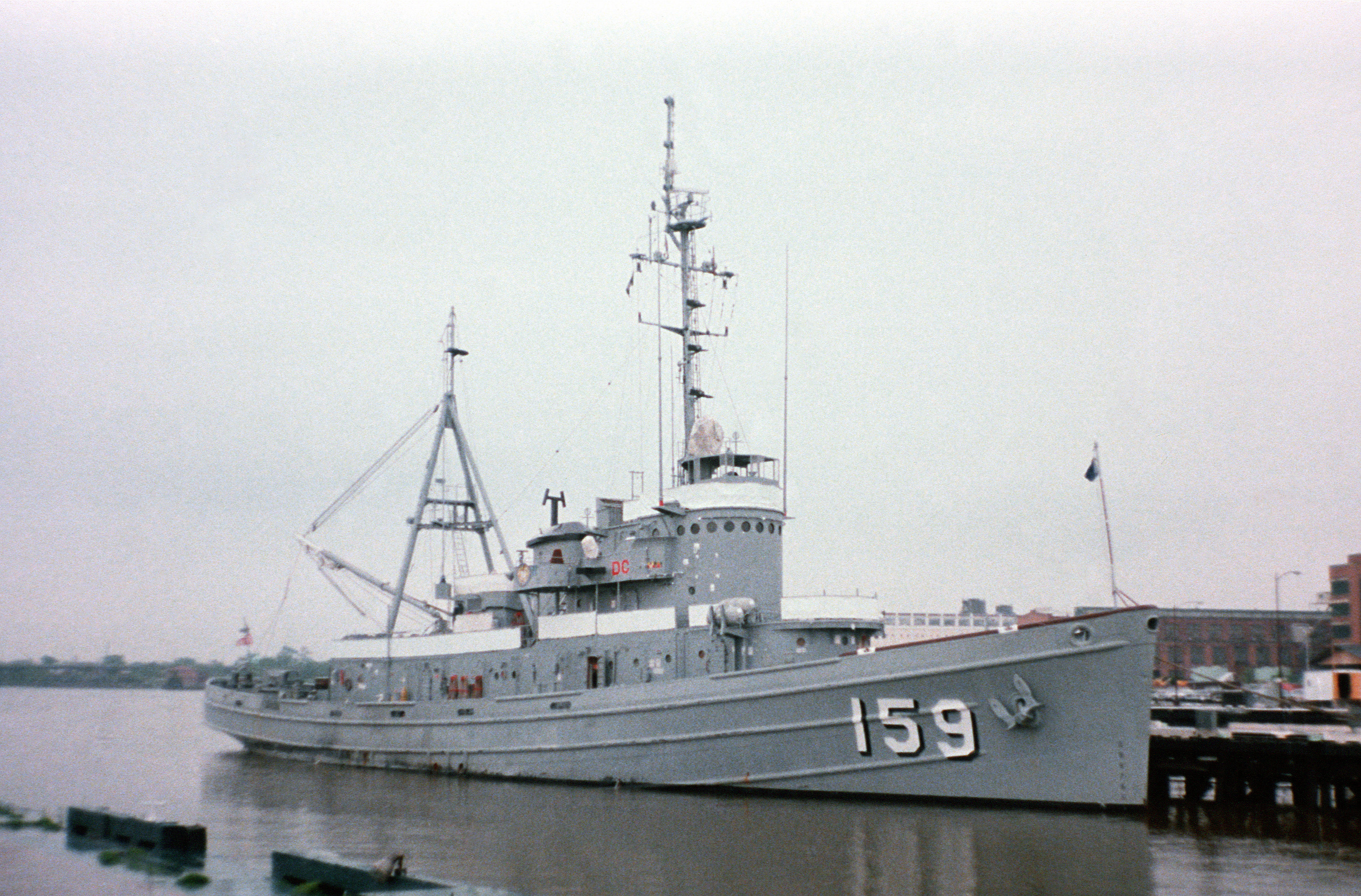
Paiute at Washington Naval Yard, 1981. Note the removal of the fore 76 mm gun.

=== Fate ===
On 7 August 1992, Paiute was decommissioned for the second and final time following the end of the Persian Gulf War. She was struck from the Naval Register on 14 February 1995, and transferred to the Maritime Administration on 29 December 1997, for disposal. Paiute was scrapped in 2003.

== Ship awards ==

Navy Meritorious Unit Commendation
Battle Effectiveness Award (2)	Navy Expeditionary Medal with star	American Campaign Medal
World War II Victory Medal	National Defense Service Medal with 2 service stars	Armed Forces Expeditionary Medal with star
