= USS Pogy (SSN-647) =

Submarine of the United States

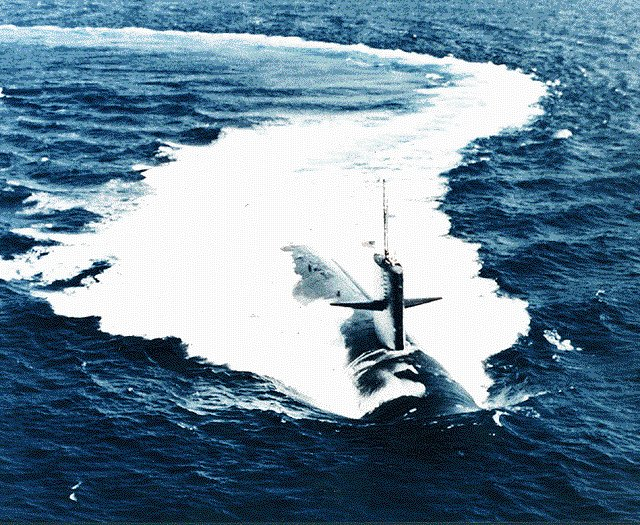
- USS Pogy (SSN-647)

History

United States
- Name: USS Pogy (SSN-647)
- Namesake: The pogy
- Awarded: 23 March 1963
- Builder: New York Shipbuilding Corporation, Camden, New Jersey; Ingalls Shipbuilding, Pascagoula, Mississippi
- Laid down: 5 May 1964
- Launched: 3 June 1967
- Sponsored by: Mrs. George Wales
- Commissioned: 15 May 1971
- Decommissioned: 11 June 1999
- Stricken: 11 June 1999
- Home port: Final Homeport San Diego, CA
- Motto: No Ka ʻOi "The best"
- Honors and awards: Various Unit Commendations, Expeditionary and Battle Efficiency Awards
- Fate: Scrapping via Ship and Submarine Recycling Program completed 12 April 2000

General characteristics
- Class & type: Sturgeon-class submarine
- Displacement: 3,975 long tons (4,039 t) light; 4,263 long tons (4,331 t) full; 288 long tons (293 t) dead
- Length: 292 ft (89 m)
- Beam: 32 ft (9.8 m)
- Draft: 29 ft (8.8 m)
- Installed power: 15,000 shaft horsepower (11.2 megawatts)
- Propulsion: One S5W nuclear reactor, two steam turbines, one screw
- Speed: 15 knots (28 km/h; 17 mph) surfaced; 25 knots (46 km/h; 29 mph) submerged
- Test depth: 1,300 ft (396 m)
- Complement: 14 officers, 95 men
- Armament: 4 × 21-inch (533 mm) torpedo tubes Mark 48 torpedoes UGM-84A/C Harpoon missiles Mark 60 CAPTOR mines Mark 61 mines Mark 67 Submarine Launched Mobile Mines Various small arms and grenade launchers

USS Pogy (SSN-647), a Sturgeon-class submarine, was the second ship of the United States Navy to be named for the pogy, or menhaden.

== Construction and commissioning ==
The contract to build Pogy was awarded on 23 March 1963, and her keel was laid down on 5 May 1964 by the New York Shipbuilding Corporation at Camden, New Jersey. She was launched on 3 June 1967, under the sponsorship of Mrs. George Wales. She was the last ship launched by New York Shipbuilding which went out of business shortly afterwards. On 5 June 1967, the contract for her construction was canceled, and she was towed to the Philadelphia Naval Shipyard at Philadelphia, Pennsylvania, in an incomplete state and laid up.

On 7 December 1967, the contract for construction of Pogy was reassigned to Ingalls Shipbuilding Corporation of Pascagoula, Mississippi, and the incomplete submarine was towed to that shipyard on 8 January 1968 for completion. Seven days underway, from Philadelphia to Pascagoula the tow line broke and Pogy was adrift for three days. (Note: Vessels involved with the towing of Pogy were USS Papago (ATF-160), USS Kiowa (ATF-72), USS Paiute (ATF-159), USS Recovery (ARS-43) and SS Cable.)

Pogy was commissioned on 15 May 1971. The seven-year time span from keel laying to commissioning was the longest construction time in history for an American submarine. This record was exceeded by USS Seawolf (SSN-21) when she was commissioned in July 1997.

== Service history ==
Pogy put to sea on 22 April 1975 for local operations. On 27 April 1975, about 5 nautical miles (9.3 km) off the coast of Oahu in the Hawaiian Islands, her lookout sighted a capsized 15-foot (4.6-meter) sailboat drifting out to sea, and the crew quickly rescued the boat's owner. He had been in the water for about an hour, and his only injuries were scrapes and bruises incurred while being hoisted up the rough side of the submarine. The same day, Pogy conducted SINKEX 1-75, a test of a warshot Mark 48 torpedo against a target submarine. She intercepted the decommissioned hulk of submarine USS Carbonero (SS-337) drifting on the surface and carrying a noisemaker for the torpedo to home on acoustically. Pogy verified positions using her periscope, then dived to about 200 feet (61 meters) to shoot the torpedo. Interior Communications Electrician IC1(SS) Joseph J. Varese, who had earned his Submarine Warfare insignia on Carbonero, and was now leading petty officer of Pogy's Interior Communications Division, was given the honor of throwing the firing switch to shoot the torpedo. A few minutes later, Pogy transmitted the traditional message: "SIGHTED SUBMARINE SANK SAME".

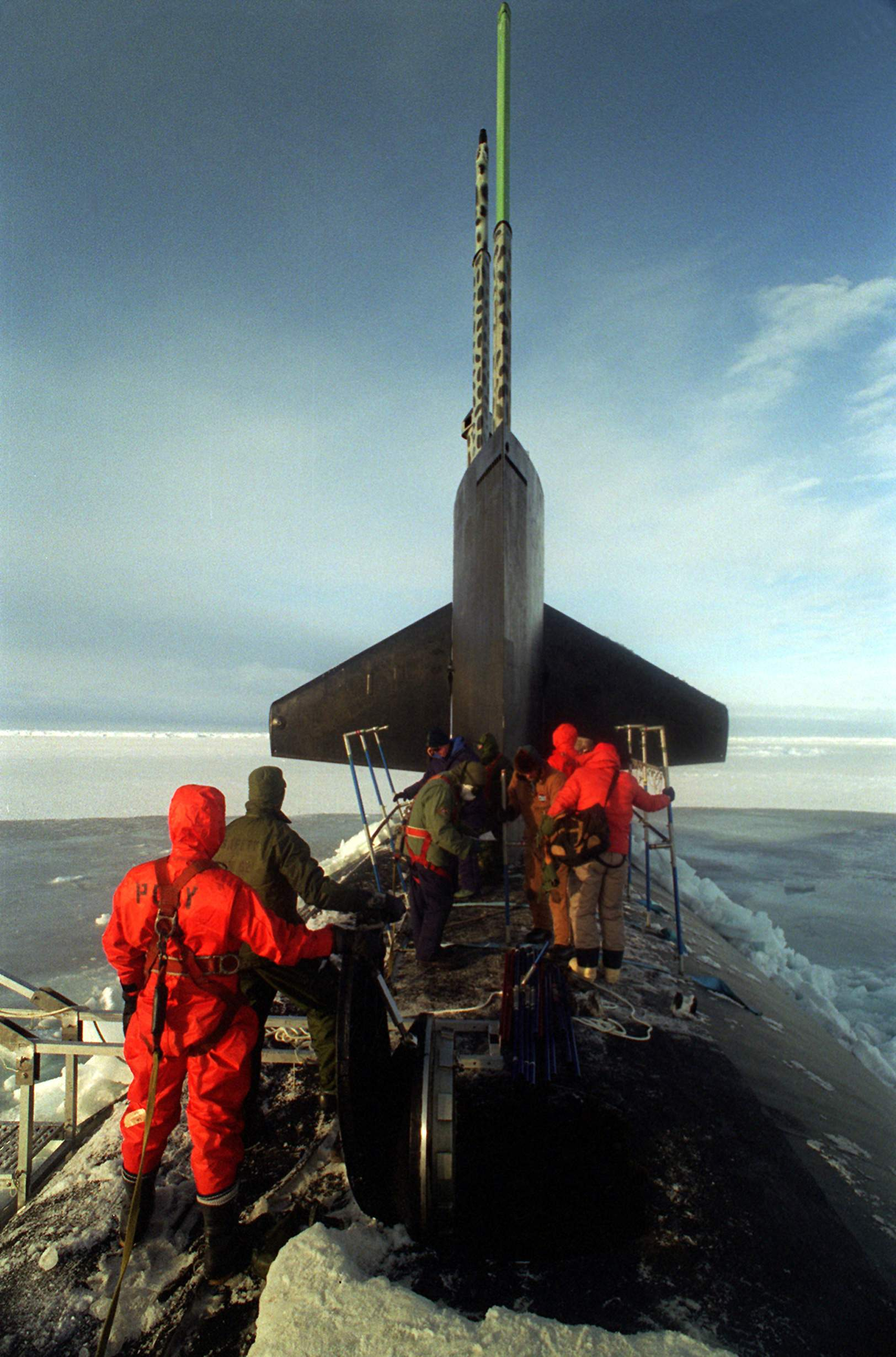
Having surfaced in the Arctic ice pack, crew members from the Pogy assemble a topside deck enclosure to provide protection from the elements while water samples are collected and cataloged in 1996.

On 25 August 1996, Pogy deployed in support of SCICEX-96 experiments. In October 1996, she transited the Bering Strait and began collecting thousands of water samples from over a hundred locations under the polar ice cap in the Arctic Ocean. She continuously recorded ocean currents and water salinity and temperature, and surfaced 19 times through the ice cap to measure surface conditions before returning to San Diego, California, on 26 November 1996.

== Decommissioning and disposal ==
Pogy was decommissioned and simultaneously struck from the Naval Vessel Register on 11 June 1999. Her scrapping via the Nuclear-Powered Ship and Submarine Recycling Program at Puget Sound Naval Shipyard in Bremerton, Washington, was completed on 12 April 2000.

== Commemoration ==
Pogy's diving plane fins can be seen as part of The Fin Project at Pelican Harbor Park in Miami, Florida.

Pogy's Ballast Control Panel is on display at the Submarine Force Museum in Groton, CT. There is a plaque on the rear wall of the exhibit denoting it as such.

== USS Pogy in fiction ==
In the 1984 Tom Clancy novel The Hunt for Red October, Pogy and the attack submarine USS Dallas (SSN-700) escort the fictitious defecting Soviet Navy ballistic missile submarine Red October. However, Pogy is not mentioned or depicted in the 1990 film The Hunt for Red October.
