= USS Alsea =

Ocean-going tugboat of the US Navy (1942–1962)

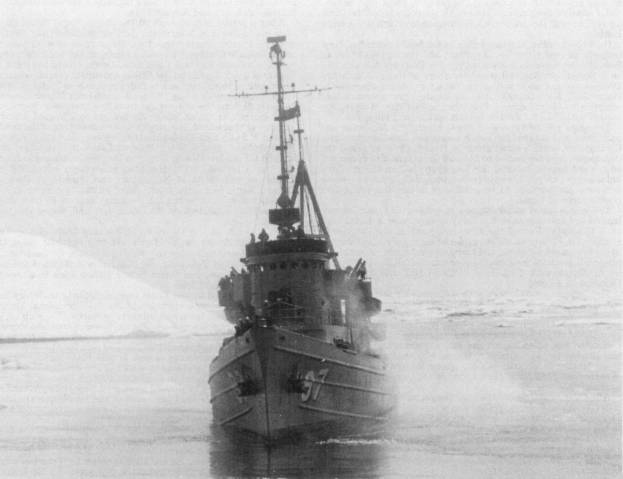
- The Alsea, on 28 June 1954, amidst Arctic ice floes during Operation Skyhook II

History

United States
- Laid down: 29 November 1942
- Launched: 22 May 1943
- Commissioned: 13 December 1943
- Reclassified: 15 May 1944
- Stricken: 1 September 1962
- Identification: IMO number: 7942257
- Honours and awards: American Campaign Medal; Europe-Africa-Middle East Campaign Medal; World War II Victory Medal; National Defense Service Medal
- Fate: Sold for scrap, 20 June 1996

General characteristics
- Displacement: 1,675 tons
- Length: 205 ft 0 in (62.48 m)
- Beam: 38 ft 6 in (11.73 m)
- Draught: 15 ft 4 in (4.67 m)
- Propulsion: 4 × General Motors 12-278A diesel main engines; 4 × General Electric generators; 3 × General Motors 3-268A auxiliary services engines; single screw; 3,600 shp
- Speed: 16.5 knots (30.6 km/h)
- Complement: 85
- Armament: 1 x 3 in (76 mm); 2 x 40 mm

USS Alsea (AT-97) was an Abnaki-class of fleet ocean tug. It was named after the Alsea Native American tribe in Oregon.

== Service ==
Alsea was laid down on 29 November 1942, at Charleston, South Carolina, by the Charleston Shipbuilding & Drydock Company; launched on 22 May 1943; sponsored by Mrs. Grace Wynn; and commissioned on 13 December 1943.

=== World War II ===
The tug completed shakedown training in Chesapeake Bay early in January 1944 and began antisubmarine warfare training at Casco Bay, Maine. In February, she entered Boston, Massachusetts for repairs and more training. The tug moved to New York City on the night of 3 March and remained there until getting underway on 26 March with a convoy of tugs towing 36 vehicle-transport barges to Great Britain in preparation for the invasion of France. After a stormy voyage, during which the convoy was attacked by a U-boat which was driven off by escort ships, Alsea and her tow reached Falmouth, England on 19 April. Alsea visited Milford Haven in Wales and Belfast in Northern Ireland. She returned to Norfolk, Virginia, on 11 May. On 15 May, she was redesignated ATF-97.

Alsea, departed Norfolk on 5 June for the British West Indies. She arrived at Trinidad on 18 June and reported for duty with the Commander, Caribbean Sea Frontier. For almost a year, the tug operated in the vicinity of the Gulf of Paria, towing targets and providing general support services for newly commissioned warships conducting initial training. She concluded that assignment in May 1945 and after, two weeks of duty at Guantanamo Bay, she headed for Tampa, Florida, where she picked up a tow. After dropping her charge at Charleston, she arrived at Norfolk on 21 June for an overhaul. On 4 August, she departed Norfolk for Bahia, Brazil, to pick up a floating drydock. Alsea arrived at Bahia three days after V-P Day; instead of taking the drydock to the Pacific Ocean as originally planned, she towed YFD-27 to Trinidad.

== After the war ==
Following the war, the tug served with the Atlantic Fleet for nearly a decade. During that period, she operated along the Atlantic seaboard and in the Gulf of Mexico and the Caribbean. She made tows, delivered mail, towed targets, and performed other general duties. Alsea was placed out of commission at Norfolk on 15 April 1955, and was berthed with the Maritime Administration's James River Group, National Defense Reserve Fleet. Though her name was struck from the Navy List on 1 September 1962, the tug remained at the James River facility until 14 May 1975 when she was returned to the USN for stripping. Although the DANFS shows the Alsea was sold for scrapping in the fall of 1975, it is incorrect. The Alsea was sold on 14 June 1976 to John S. Latsis of Piraeus, Greece. She was then reactivated for commercial service under the name Ikosiena for Amphitrite Shipping & Trading Corp. S.A., Panama. She served until she was sold on 20 June 1996 for scrapping thus ending her days at the scrapyard in Aliaga, Turkey starting 25 July 1996.
