= USS Mosopelea =

Abnaki-class tugboat

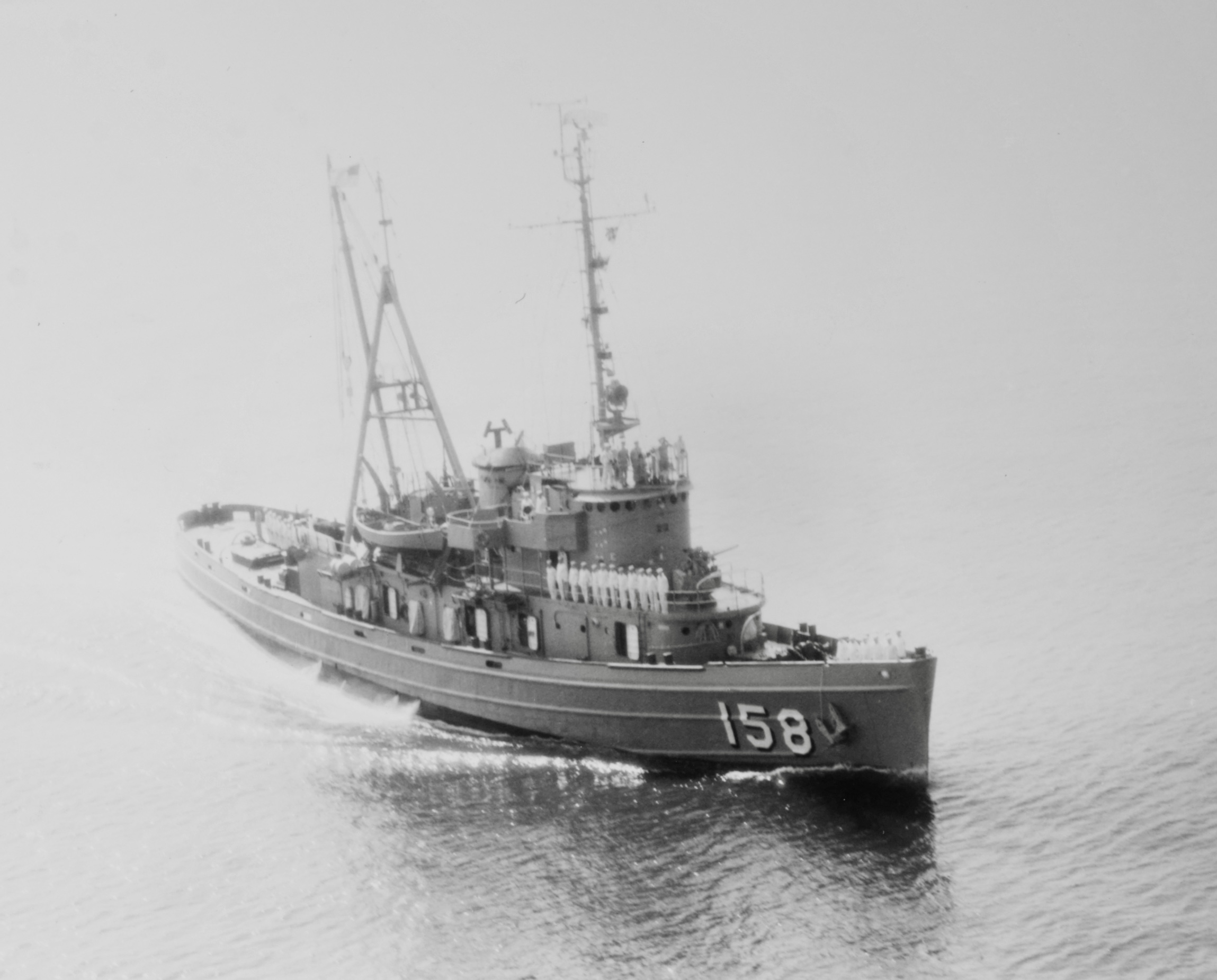
- USS Mosopelea

History

United States
- Name: Mosopelea
- Namesake: Mosopelea
- Builder: Charleston Shipbuilding & Drydock Co.
- Laid down: 2 January 1945
- Launched: 7 May 1945
- Sponsored by: Mrs. David Leroy Key
- Commissioned: 28 July 1945
- Decommissioned: 2 July 1973
- Stricken: 21 February 1992
- Identification: Callsign: NZIX; Hull number: ATF-158
- Honours and awards: See Awards
- Fate: Sunk as target, 27 October 1999

General characteristics
- Class & type: Abnaki-class tugboat
- Displacement: 1,589 t (1,564 long tons), standard; 1,675 t (1,649 long tons), full
- Length: 205 ft 0 in (62.48 m)
- Beam: 38 ft 6 in (11.73 m)
- Draft: 15 ft 4 in (4.67 m)
- Installed power: 1 × shaft; 3,600 shp (2,700 kW)
- Propulsion: 4 × General Motors 12-278A diesel engines; 4 × General Electric generators; 3 × General Motors 3-268A auxiliary services engines
- Speed: 16.5 knots (30.6 km/h; 19.0 mph)
- Range: 15,000 nmi (28,000 km; 17,000 mi) at 8 knots (15 km/h; 9.2 mph)
- Complement: 85 officers and enlisted
- Sensors & processing systems: AN/SPS-5B surface-search radar
- Armament: 1 × single 3"/50 caliber gun; 2 × twin Bofors 40 mm guns; 2 × single Oerlikon 20 mm cannons

USS Mosopelea (ATF-158) was an Abnaki-class tugboat of the United States Navy which served during the World War II and Cold War. Her namesake is an Indian tribe which inhabited the area near the junction of the Ohio and Mississippi Rivers.

== Design and description ==
The ship displaced 1,589 tonnes (1,564 long tons) at standard load and 1,675 tonnes (1,649 long tons) at deep load. The ship measured 205 feet (62.5 m) long overall with a beam of 38 feet 6 inches (11.7 m). She had a draft of 15 feet 4 inches (4.7 m). The ships' complement consisted of 85 officers and ratings.

The ships had two General Motors 12-278A diesel engines, one shaft. The engines produced a total of 3,600 shaft horsepower (2,700 kW) and gave a maximum speed of 16.5 knots (30.6 km/h; 19.0 mph). They carried a maximum of 10 tonnes (10 long tons) of fuel oil that gave them a range of 15,000 nmi (28,000 km; 17,000 mi) at 8 knots (15 km/h; 9.2 mph).

The Abnaki class was armed with a 3"/50 caliber gun anti-aircraft gun, two single-mount Oerlikon 20 mm cannon and two twin-gun mounts for Bofors 40 mm gun.

== Construction and career ==
The ship was built at the Charleston Shipbuilding & Drydock Co. at Charleston, South Carolina. She was laid down on 2 January 1945 and launched on 7 May 1945. The ship was commissioned on 28 July 1945. She was reclassified ATF-104 on 15 May 1944.

Following shakedown off the east coast, Mosopelea departed Portsmouth Navy Yard, N.H., in early October 1945 with a tow for San Francisco, California. Steaming via the Panama Canal, the tug arrived at San Francisco on 8 November and operated off the California coast until return to Charleston with a tow, 27 January 1946. Moving on to Norfolk, the ship made a voyage to Oran, Algeria, in February, returning via Trinidad, Key West, and Boston, to Norfolk 2 May. From June to September, she made a voyage to Iceland, and then operated out of Norfolk into 1947, departing on 6 January for Bermuda and returning after an extended tow and limited deployment on 23 March.

The fleet tug continued to operate out of Norfolk, making a number of cruises to the Caribbean and gulf coast ports until June 1948, and then departed on the 12th as escort for 11 Turkish naval vessels bound for Gibraltar via Bermuda, returning 21 July.

For the next 16 years, Mosopelea operated out of Norfolk to principal ports on the eastern seaboard, also making frequent cruises to the Caribbean and operating for short intervals at ports in Labrador and Newfoundland. Supplying ships of the fleet with her valuable towing services, the tugboat made numerous extended deployments to San Juan, Mayport and Guantanamo Bay, for months at a time, operating out of those ports on various towing, research, and salvage assignments.

During the Cuban missile crisis of October‑November 1962, the ship operated on standby emergency status, towing Army personnel barges from Charleston to Port Everglades, in preparation for a possible invasion of Cuba. On 15 September 1964, the fleet tug departed Norfolk on her first 6 months deployment with the 6th Fleet in the Mediterranean, becoming the first fleet tug possessing full salvage and diving capabilities to serve with the 6th Fleet. She operated on extended deployment in the Mediterranean into 1965 and then returned to Norfolk in late winter to resume her previous duties.

Mosopelea continued on her valuable service to the Atlantic Fleet, basing out of Norfolk and performing towing, salvage, and research duties all along the east coast and in the Caribbean into 1969. She underwent overhaul in the fall of 1970 at Norfolk shipyard. Afterward she resumed fleet duties out of Little Creek, VA and Guantanamo.

== Awards ==
- Navy Expeditionary Medal
- American Campaign Medal
- World War II Victory Medal
- National Defense Service Medal (2 awards)
- Armed Forces Expeditionary Medal
