= USS Chowanoc =

Tugboat of the United States Navy

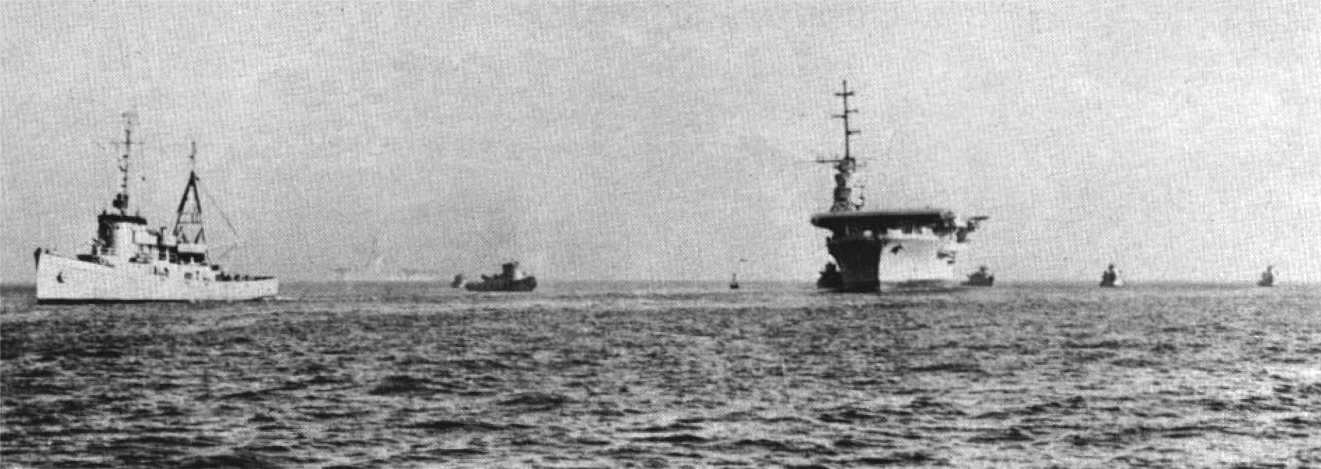
- Chowanoc (left) towing the decommissioned aircraft carrier USS Philippine Sea circa 1958.

History

United States
- Name: Chowanoc (ATF-100)
- Builder: Charleston Shipbuilding and Dry Dock Co.
- Laid down: unknown
- Launched: 20 August 1943
- Commissioned: 21 February 1944
- Decommissioned: 1 October 1977
- Stricken: 1 October 1977
- Fate: Transferred to Ecuador, 1 October 1977

Ecuador
- Name: BAE Chimborazo (RA-70)
- Acquired: 1 October 1977
- Status: In service as of 2019

General characteristics
- Class & type: Abnaki-class fleet ocean tug
- Displacement: 1,240 long tons (1,260 t)
- Length: 205 ft (62 m)
- Beam: 38 ft 6 in (11.73 m)
- Draft: 15 ft 4 in (4.67 m)
- Speed: 16.5 knots (19.0 mph; 30.6 km/h)
- Complement: 85
- Armament: 1 × 3 in (76 mm) gun; 2 × 20 mm guns

Service record
- Part of: Pacific Fleet
- Commanders: LT. Rodney F. Snipes
- Operations: World War II; Korean War; Vietnam War
- Awards: 4 battle stars (World War II); 1 battle star (Korea); 7 battle stars (Vietnam)

USS Chowanoc (ATF-100) was an Abnaki-class of fleet ocean tug. It was named after an Indian tribe of the same name.

== Service history ==
World War 2:

Worked on the Marianas operation, with the Capture and occupation of Saipan from 3 to 10 August 1944. worked on the capture and occupation of Guam from 3 to 15 August 1944. Working on the Luzon operation in the Lingayen Gulf landings from 9 to 18 January 1945. Worked on the Leyte operation in the Leyte landings from 20 to 22 November 1944.

Korean War: Worked in Korean in the 1952 and 1953.

Vietnam War: Worked in the Vietnamese Counteroffensive from 9 to 12 April 1966. Worked in the Vietnamese Counteroffensive - Phase II from 28 July to 1 August 1966. Worked in the Vietnamese Counteroffensive - Phase V from 8 to 10 October 1968. Worked in the Vietnamese Counteroffensive - Phase VI from 10 to 17 November 1968, 29 November to 5 December 1968 and 12 December 1968 to 11 January 1969. Serviced in the Vietnamese Counteroffensive - Phase VII from 19 to 22 May 1971, 7 to 23January 1973 and 21 February to 21 March 1973.

Chowanoc was sold to the Ecuadorian Navy on 1 October 1977 under the Security Assistance Program and renamed BAE Chimborazo (RA-70).

On 2 March 2020, Chimborazo was quarantined for two weeks at Guayaquil South Naval Base after a member of its 50-person crew was discovered to have been in contact with someone infected with COVID-19.

== Notable personnel ==
- Richard Benjamin Harrison served on the ship from 1972 to 1976.
