= USS Moctobi =

Abnaki-class fleet ocean tug in the US Navy

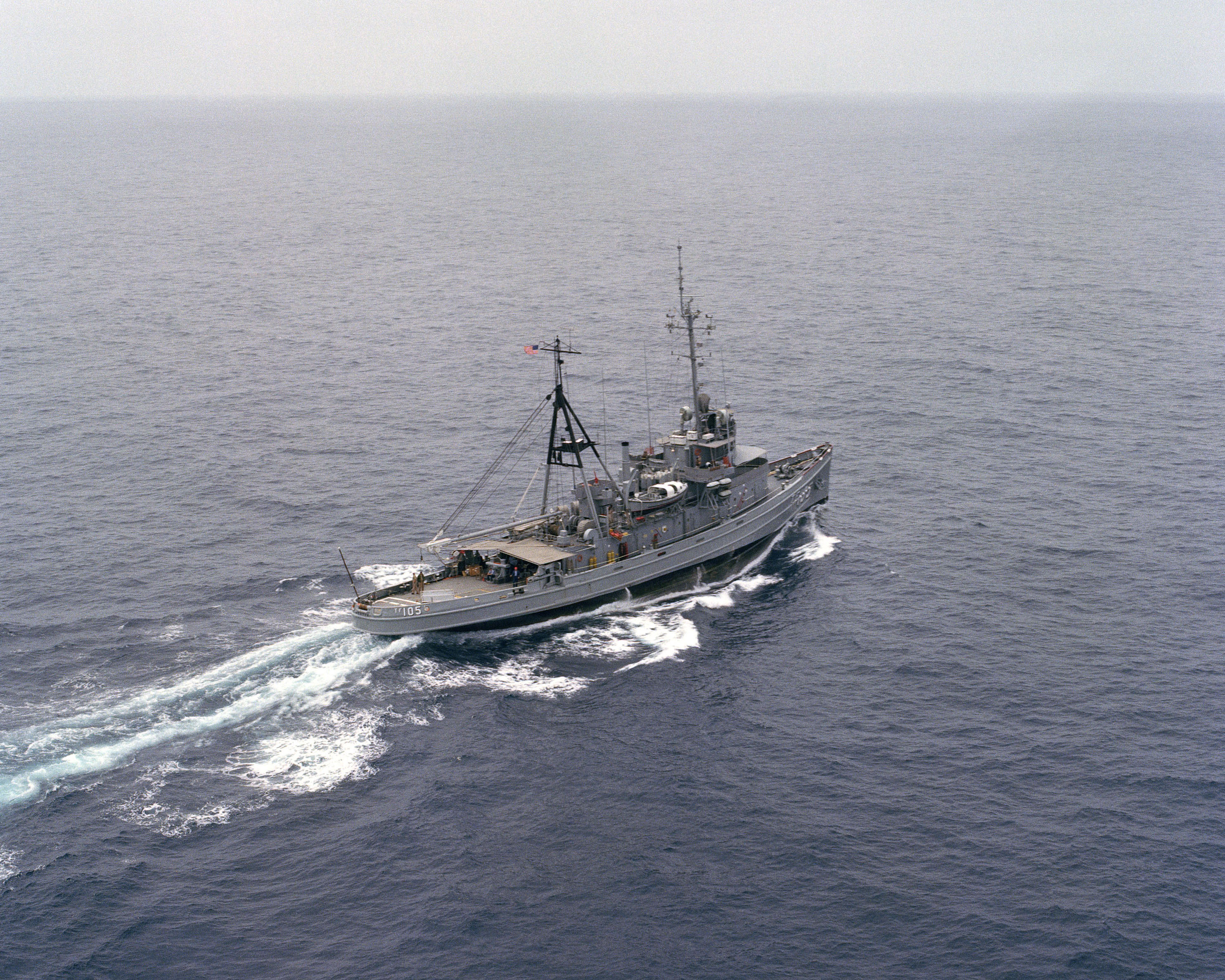
- USS Moctobi underway in 1983

History

United States
- Name: Moctobi
- Builder: Charleston Shipbuilding and Dry Dock Co.
- Laid down: 7 October 1943
- Launched: 25 March 1944
- Commissioned: 25 July 1944
- Decommissioned: 30 June 1948
- Recommissioned: 8 November 1950
- Decommissioned: 30 September 1985
- Stricken: 27 January 1992
- Fate: Sold to the Northeast Wisconsin Railroad Transportation Commission, 29 December 1997; scrapped 2012

General characteristics
- Class & type: Abnaki-class tugboat
- Displacement: 1,675 tons
- Length: 205 ft 0 in (62.48 m)
- Beam: 38 ft 6 in (11.73 m)
- Draught: 15 ft 4 in (4.67 m)
- Propulsion: 4 × General Motors 12-278A diesel main engines; 4 × General Electric generators; 3 × General Motors 3-268A auxiliary services engines; single screw; 3,600 shp
- Speed: 16.5 knots (30.6 km/h)
- Complement: 85
- Armament: 1 x 3 in (76 mm); 2 x 40 mm

Service record
- Part of: Pacific Fleet
- Commanders: LT. John M. Geortner
- Operations: World War II; Korean War; Vietnam War
- Awards: 2 battle stars (Korea); 2 battle stars (Vietnam)

USS Moctobi (ATF-105) was an Abnaki-class of fleet ocean tug. She served in World War II, Vietnam, and Korea, the last two of which she received battle stars. She was scrapped in 2012.

== Construction history ==
Moctobi was laid down as AT‑105 by Charleston Shipbuilding & Drydock Co. at Charleston, South Carolina on 7 October 1943. She was launched on 25 March 1944 with Mrs. Wade C. Harrison as her sponsor. The tug was named for a small Native American tribe that resided in south Mississippi. They are mentioned by Pierre Le Moyne, Sieur d’Iberville, in 1699, as living on Pascagoula river, near the Gulf coast, and was associated with the Biloxi tribes. The Moctobi tribe has since been lost to Native American memory and tradition, and is thought to have been assimilated into the Choctaw tribe due to war, pestilence, or other calamity.

The tug was reclassified ATF‑105 on 15 May 1944 and commissioned into the United States Navy at Charleston on 25 July 1944.

== Service history ==
=== World War II ===
Following shakedown, Moctobi was assigned to duty in the Pacific with Service Force, United States Pacific Fleet. Departing Norfolk, Virginia on 1 September 1944, she stopped at New Orleans where she took in tow a section of the large floating dock USS ABSD-3 for the Marshall Islands on 8 September. She reached Eniwetok via Majuro on 21 November and then delivered another ABSD section, from Pearl Harbor, at Eniwetok on 29 December. She departed 2 January 1945 for Guam, dropping off ABD‑16 there on 9 January, then moving on to the important advance base at Ulithi.

Assigned to Service Squadron 10, Moctobi operated out of Ulithi until the end of the war in the Pacific. There she carried out the harbor duties necessary to prepare ships of the task forces for their strikes against the enemy. During the Battle of Iwo Jima she served on a standby basis with the Support Force and at the conclusion of the campaign towed USS Marl (IX-160) from Saipan to Ulithi.

On 30 March 1945 Moctobi sailed with units of the fast tanker fleet and joined the Logistic Support Group off Okinawa. During the next 47 days she provided at-sea support for ships of the 5th Fleet, thence returned to Ulithi on 12 May. After completing a round trip to Leyte Gulf, she sailed on 3 July with other ATFs to support the 3rd Fleet Bombardment Force. She served at sea during the closing weeks of the war and arrived Yokosuka, Japan, after the cessation of hostilities. The tug began supporting occupation operations on 29 August and aided in the landing of initial occupation forces in the Tokyo area. She towed American and Japanese ships and supported demolition operations of Japanese suicide boats and submarines along the eastern coast of Honshu.

=== Post-war service ===
Moctobi arrived at Okinawa in October 1945 and for more than two months assisted the salvage of the many ships damaged by typhoons. On Christmas Eve she sailed for Pearl Harbor with floating dock USS ARD‑29 in tow. She returned to the US west coast in May 1946 and later that year deployed once again to the Far East. She operated in the Philippines until June 1947, returning to the United States. She began pre-inactivation overhaul at San Francisco on 1 December and decommissioned on 30 June 1948. Assigned to the Pacific Reserve Fleet on 27 August, she was berthed at Alameda, California.

On 8 November 1950 Moctobi was recommissioned at San Francisco. After training, she deployed to the Far East and by November 1951 had touched Midway, Eniwetok, Kwajalein, Guam, Subic Bay, Sasebo, Yokosuka, Inchon, Pusan, Okinawa, Taiwan, and Daecheongdo, Korea. In September she conducted salvage operations on the frigate ROKS Apnok (62) off Abru Somu Island, North Korea, towing the damaged ship to Pusan thence to Yokosuka for repairs. After overhaul at Pearl Harbor, between April and September 1952 she made several towing trips to Johnston Island and the Marshall Islands.

From November 1952 the tug was deployed on towing and search and rescue duties in the Aleutians from Dutch Harbor to Attu. Thereafter, from her base at Pearl Harbor, Moctobi spent more than three decades constantly employed throughout the Pacific, including classified operations for the Atomic Energy Commission. An unusual task in 1963 was to tow the iron-hulled clipper ship Falls of Clyde from Seattle to Honolulu to become a museum ship. In November and December 1964, Moctobi participated in a chemical warfare experiment off Hawaii under Project SHAD code-named Flower Drum II, which dispersed VX nerve agent tagged with radioactive phosphorus-32 from a towed barge.

Moctobi entered ROH at Dillinham Shipyard in Honolulu in 1975. In 1976, she conducted Refresher Training (REFTRA) and Salvage Training. That summer, Moctobi changed her homeport to Everett, Washington. While a new pier was being built at the Naval Reserve Center in Everett, Moctobi docked at a quay wall adjacent to the now closed Scott Paper Mill facility. Later that year, Moctobi made port visits to Vancouver, Portland, San Francisco and San Diego. While in San Diego, Moctobi underwent engineering and habitability maintenance, and had the 3" gun mount permanently removed.

=== Decommissioning and sale ===
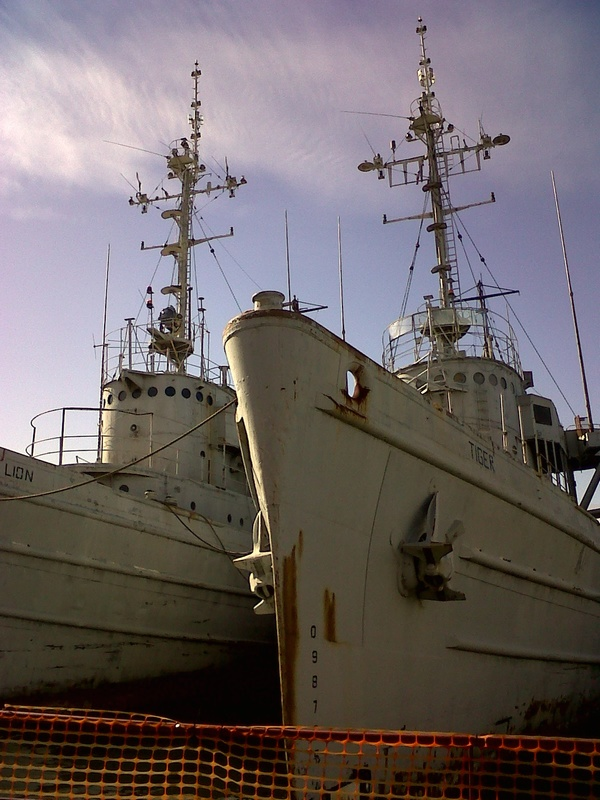
USS Moctobi (Lion left) with USS Quapaw (Tiger right) at Richmond Shipyards, California in April, 2011

USS Moctobi was decommissioned on 30 September 1985 at Long Beach, California and laid up in the Pacific Reserve Fleet, Bremerton, Washington. She was struck from the Naval Register on 27 January 1992.

Following Congressional approval in 1996 for transfer to the Northeast Wisconsin Railroad Transportation Commission, she was handed over on 29 December 1997 to the Ontonagon County Economic Development Corporation on behalf of the Escanaba and Lake Superior Railroad, along with five other obsolete sister tugs. They were intended for a new trans-Lake Superior freight car barge service between Ontonagon and Thunder Bay, Ontario, though it has been suggested that the company sought the tug's four General Motors engines (24 in all) to use in their locomotives. The project was abandoned in October 1999, shortly before title would have passed to the railroad company. Moctobi remained in lay-up between 1997 and 1999.

She was reported scrapped in 2012.
