= USS Hidatsa =

Abnaki-class tugboat

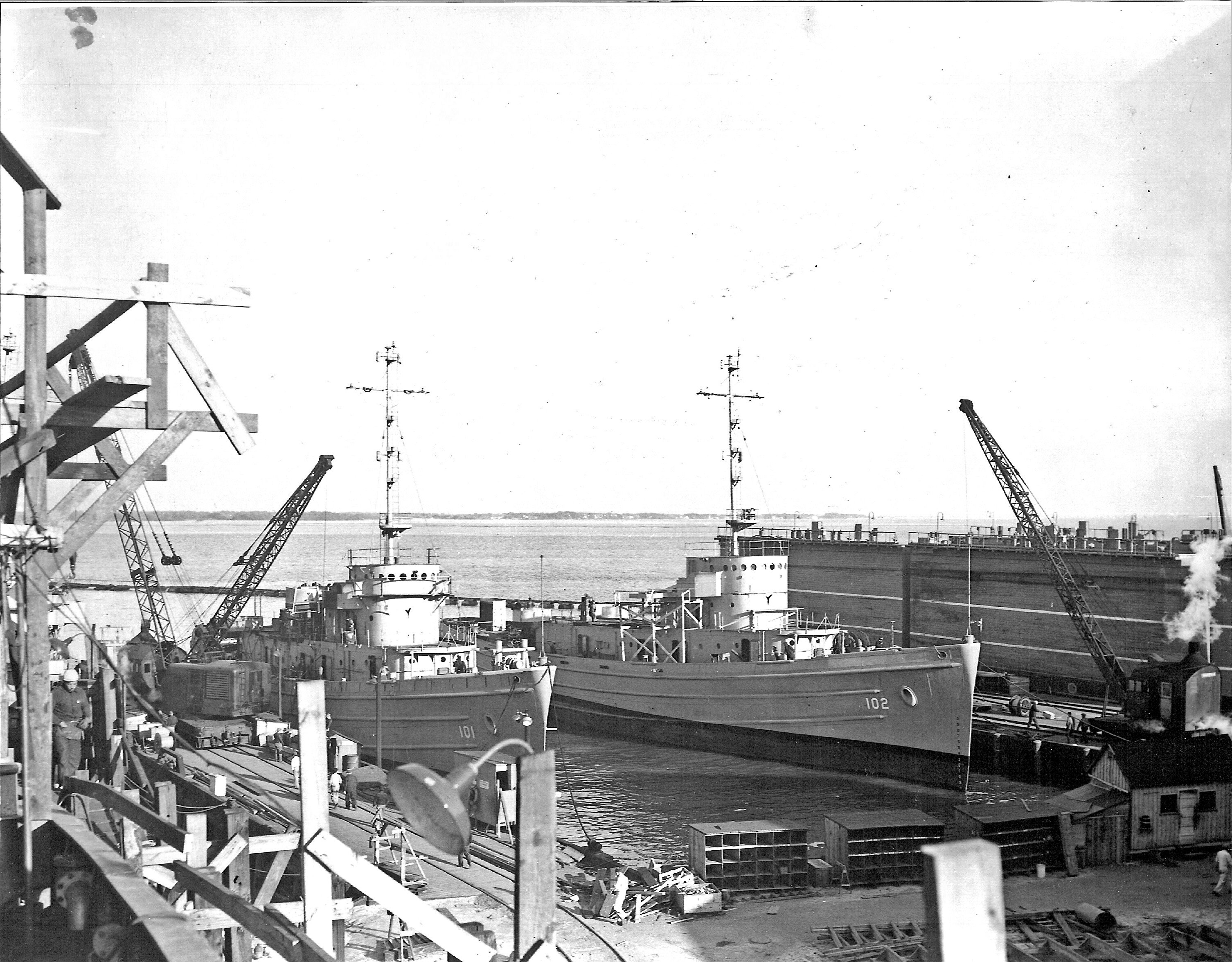
- USS Hidatsa

History

United States
- Name: Hidatsa
- Namesake: Hidatsa
- Builder: Charleston Shipbuilding & Drydock Co.
- Launched: 29 December 1943
- Sponsored by: Mrs. Dorothy S. White
- Commissioned: 25 April 1944
- Decommissioned: 5 May 1948
- Reclassified: ATF-102, 1944
- Stricken: 1 July 1963
- Identification: Callsign: NWRB; Hull number: AT-102
- Honours and awards: See Awards
- Fate: Sold to Colombia, 1979

History

Colombia
- Name: Rodrigo de Bastidas
- Namesake: Rodrigo de Bastidas
- Acquired: 1 March 1979
- Decommissioned: 1998
- Identification: Pennant number: RM-74

General characteristics
- Class & type: Abnaki-class tugboat
- Displacement: 1,589 t (1,564 long tons), standard; 1,675 t (1,649 long tons), full
- Length: 205 ft 0 in (62.48 m)
- Beam: 38 ft 6 in (11.73 m)
- Draft: 15 ft 4 in (4.67 m)
- Installed power: 1 × shaft; 3,600 shp (2,700 kW)
- Propulsion: 4 × General Motors 12-278A diesel engines; 4 × General Electric generators; 3 × General Motors 3-268A auxiliary services engines
- Speed: 16.5 knots (30.6 km/h; 19.0 mph)
- Range: 15,000 nmi (28,000 km; 17,000 mi) at 8 knots (15 km/h; 9.2 mph)
- Complement: 85 officers and enlisted
- Armament: 1 × single 3"/50 caliber gun; 2 × twin Bofors 40 mm guns; 2 × single Oerlikon 20 mm cannons

USS Hidatsa (ATF-102) was Abnaki-class tugboat during the World War II. The ship was later sold to Colombia as ARC Rodrigo de Bastidas (RM-74). Her namesake is an Indian group of the Sioux Tribe of North Dakota, now living on the Fort Berthold Reservation.

== Design and description ==
The ship is displaced 1,589 tonnes (1,564 long tons) at standard load and 1,675 tonnes (1,649 long tons) at deep load The ships measured 205 feet (62.5 m) long overall with a beam of 38 feet 6 inches (11.7 m). They had a draft of 15 feet 4 inches (4.7 m). The ships' complement consisted of 85 officers and ratings.

The ships had two General Motors 12-278A diesel engines, one shaft. The engines produced a total of 3,600 shaft horsepower (2,700 kW) and gave a maximum speed of 16.5 knots (30.6 km/h; 19.0 mph). They carried a maximum of 10 tonnes (10 long tons) of fuel oil that gave them a range of 15,000 nmi (28,000 km; 17,000 mi) at 8 knots (15 km/h; 9.2 mph).

The Abnaki class was armed with a 3"/50 caliber gun anti-aircraft gun, two single-mount Oerlikon 20 mm cannon and two twin-gun mounts for Bofors 40 mm gun.

== Construction and career ==
The ship was built at the Charleston Shipbuilding & Drydock Co. at Charleston, South Carolina. She was launched on 29 December 1943. The ship was commissioned on 25 April 1944. She was reclassified ATF-102 on 15 May 1944.

=== Service in the United States Navy ===
After shakedown in Chesapeake Bay, Hidatsa departed Norfolk on 3 June 1944 with two floating destroyer workshops in tow and reached Manus Island, Admiralties, via the Panama Canal, Bora bora, and Espiritu Santo on 4 September. On 20 September, Hidatsa towed two pontoon barges to Morotai to be used in docks assembled on that newly taken island. Next, she towed seven more barges to Mios Woendi. Then, as the long Pacific campaign moved steadily northward, the fleet tug departed Mios Woendi on 13 October with a gasoline barge, a crane barge, and a PT drydock in tow, for use in the invasion of the Philippine Islands. As Hidatsa reached Leyte Gulf, scene of the initial landings, on 25 October, she could observe gun flashes from the Battle of Surigao Straits, part of Japan's desperate attempt to deny America the Philippines. But for brief voyages to Manus and Hollandia, Hidatsa remained at Leyte on fire fighting, towing and salvage assignments until 3 January 1945. That day she sailed to participate in the initial landings at Lingayen Gulf, where she remained from 9 to 18 January during the vicious Japanese kamikaze attacks.

Hidatsa next participated in landings at Zambales and Grande Island, where she was active in salvage and towing work. On the morning of 17 February, while returning from the initial assault landings at Corregidor, the tug struck a mine in Mariveles Harbor killing 8 of her crew and injuring another 12. Towed to Subic Bay on 18 February, Hidatsa remained there for repairs and trials until she sailed 2 August 1945 for Manus Island, where she received the welcome news of Japan's surrender. Although the war was over, there was much work to be done, and the fleet tug remained in the Philippines for salvage operations until 7 April 1946.

Reaching San Pedro, California, via Eniwetok and Pearl Harbor, 13 June, Hidatsa engaged in training operations. She returned to the Pacific in 1947 for salvage and towing operations, primarily at Eniwetok and Kwajalein. Hidatsa departed Mare Island for Alaska on 28 August 1947 and spent most of the next 2 months operating in the northern waters. Operations along the California coast, with a February 1948 cruise to Pearl Harbor, occupied Hidatsa until she decommissioned and went into reserve at Long Beach, 5 May 1948.

=== Service in the Columbian Navy ===
In 1962, Hidatsa was transferred to the Maritime Commission, National Defense Reserve Fleet at Suisun Bay, California, where she would later be sold to Colombia on 1 March 1979, as ARC Rodrigo de Bastidas (RM-74).

She was put out of service in 1998.

== Awards ==
The ship has a total of 2 battle stars throughout her career.

- Navy Unit Commendation
- China Service Medal (extended)
- American Campaign Medal
- Asiatic-Pacific Campaign Medal (2 battle stars)
- World War II Victory Medal
- Navy Occupation Service Medal (with Asia clasp)
- Philippines Presidential Unit Citation
- Philippine Liberation Medal (1 award)
