= USS Hitchiti =

Abnaki-class tugboat

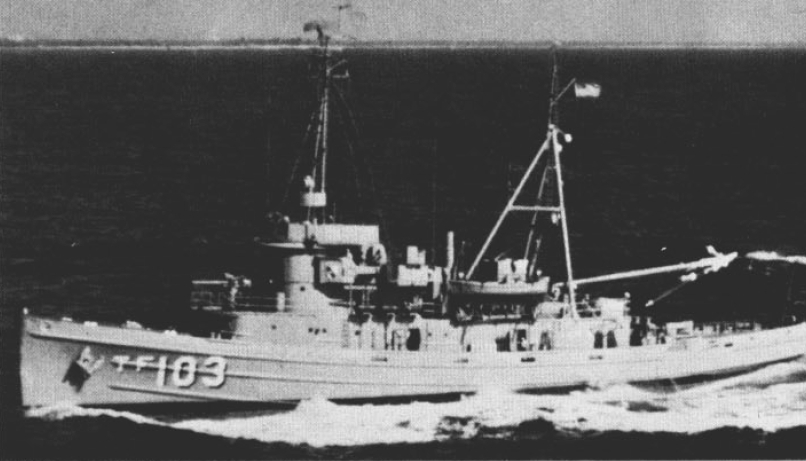
- USS Hitchiti

History

United States
- Name: Hitchiti
- Namesake: Hitchiti
- Builder: Charleston Shipbuilding & Drydock Co.
- Laid down: 24 August 1943
- Launched: 29 January 1944
- Sponsored by: Mrs. Olin D. Johnston
- Commissioned: 27 May 1944
- Decommissioned: 30 April 1948
- Recommissioned: 3 January 1951
- Stricken: 30 September 1979
- Identification: Callsign: NWUB; Hull number: ATF-103
- Honours and awards: See Awards
- Fate: Sold to Mexico, 1976

History

Mexico
- Name: Chac
- Namesake: Chaac
- Acquired: 1 September 1976
- Commissioned: 30 September 1978
- Decommissioned: 16 June 2021
- Identification: Pennant number: R-55
- Renamed: Cora
- Namesake: Cora
- Reclassified: ARE-04, 2001
- Home port: Manzanillo

General characteristics
- Class & type: Abnaki-class tugboat
- Displacement: 1,589 t (1,564 long tons), standard; 1,675 t (1,649 long tons), full
- Length: 205 ft 0 in (62.48 m)
- Beam: 38 ft 6 in (11.73 m)
- Draft: 15 ft 4 in (4.67 m)
- Installed power: 1 × shaft; 3,600 shp (2,700 kW)
- Propulsion: 4 × General Motors 12-278A diesel engines; 4 × General Electric generators; 3 × General Motors 3-268A auxiliary services engines
- Speed: 16.5 knots (30.6 km/h; 19.0 mph)
- Range: 15,000 nmi (28,000 km; 17,000 mi) at 8 knots (15 km/h; 9.2 mph)
- Complement: 85 officers and enlisted
- Sensors & processing systems: AN/SPS-5B surface-search radar
- Armament: 1 × single 3"/50 caliber gun; 2 × twin Bofors 40 mm guns; 2 × single Oerlikon 20 mm cannons

USS Hitchiti (ATF-103) was Abnaki-class tugboat during the World War II, Korea and Vietnam. The ship was later sold to Mexico as ARM Chac (R-55). Her namesake is a tribe of Creek Indians who lived in Florida and Georgia. The word "Hitchiti" means "to look up the stream."

== Design and description ==
The ship is displaced 1,589 tonnes (1,564 long tons) at standard load and 1,675 tonnes (1,649 long tons) at deep load The ships measured 205 feet (62.5 m) long overall with a beam of 38 feet 6 inches (11.7 m). They had a draft of 15 feet 4 inches (4.7 m). The ships' complement consisted of 85 officers and ratings.

The ships had two General Motors 12-278A diesel engines, one shaft. The engines produced a total of 3,600 shaft horsepower (2,700 kW) and gave a maximum speed of 16.5 knots (30.6 km/h; 19.0 mph). They carried a maximum of 10 tonnes (10 long tons) of fuel oil that gave them a range of 15,000 nmi (28,000 km; 17,000 mi) at 8 knots (15 km/h; 9.2 mph).

The Abnaki class was armed with a 3"/50 caliber gun anti-aircraft gun, two single-mount Oerlikon 20 mm cannon and two twin-gun mounts for Bofors 40 mm gun.

== Construction and career ==
The ship was built at the Charleston Shipbuilding & Drydock Co. at Charleston, South Carolina. She was laid down on 24 August 1943 and launched on 29 January 1944. The ship was commissioned on 27 May 1944.

=== Service in the United States Navy ===
==== 1944–1948 ====
After shakedown in the Chesapeake Bay area, the fleet tug sailed for the Pacific, reaching Pearl Harbor with four tows 26 August 1944. Hitchiti was engaged in towing operations at Eniwetok and Ulithi until October, when she joined the support unit off the Philippine Islands during the momentous Battle of Leyte Gulf. She returned to Ulithi for further towing operations until 29 December when she joined the 3rd Fleet for the seizure of Luzon. Work off Okinawa alternated with operations in the Philippines that summer, and as the war ended, Hitchiti remained in the Pacific for salvage and towing operations.

In 1946, she performed harbor duty in Japanese waters as well as at various Pacific Island bases, returning to the United States in September for overhaul at Bremerton. After further harbor work at Pearl Harbor and Kwajalein, Hitchiti reached San Francisco on 26 December 1947 and decommissioned there 30 April 1948.

==== 1948–1956 ====
Recommissioned at Alameda, California on 3 January 1951, amid the Korean War. Hitchiti joined the fleet in Japanese waters on 21 April to participate in operations off the Korean coast. Escort duties alternated with salvage operations along the war-torn peninsula until she returned to Pearl Harbor on 5 February 1952.

Hitchiti participated in towing and salvage work at Pearl Harbor and along the California coast until sailing for Alaskan waters on 23 March 1954. Her 7-month tour in the north was followed by further duty in Hawaii and off the West Coast until she returned for a brief tour in September 1955.

Hitchiti sailed for Sasebo, Japan on 22 May 1956, to begin her first Western Pacific cruise. This and six subsequent cruises took her to Hong Kong, Guam, Okinawa, and the Philippines for towing and salvage as well as tactical training.

==== 1956–1967 ====
Hitchiti's Western Pacific deployments, interspersed with duty at Pearl Harbor and off the California coast, were varied by visits to Mexico in 1959 and 1961 as well as a third cruise to Alaskan waters from 21 October 1960 until 14 January 1961. From 19 September to 14 November 1962, the veteran fleet tug participated in U.S. nuclear testing at Johnston Island in the Pacific. All of 1963 was spent serving the fleet in Hawaiian waters. On 26 October, Hitchiti freed Hai Fu off Honolulu after the Chinese merchant ship had grounded.

Hitchiti joined the 7th Fleet on 18 May 1964 and operated off Vietnam, during the Vietnam War. She once again returned to Pearl Harbor on 7 October for a brief refitting. From 25 January 1965 to 23 March, Hitchiti made a birdlife study on South Pacific islands for the Smithsonian Institution. She once again joined the 7th Fleet off Vietnam 25 October and operated in the war zone until 12 April 1966. Hitchiti arrived back at Pearl Harbor on 27 April having 9,000 miles of towing and four salvage operations to her credit during the deployment. She then operated in Hawaiian waters into 1967.

She was finally stricken on 30 September 1979.

=== Service in the Mexican Navy ===
The SEMAR highlighted that the ARM Cora (ARE-04) was acquired from the United States on September 1, 1976, under the Security Assistance Program to Mexico, and was discharged in the Mexican Navy on September 30, 1978, being flagged in the then Second Naval Zone based in Ensenada, BC. During the period from February 1, 1994, to May 16, 2001, it had the name Chac (R-55), later changing its name to the current name.

On 6 November 2001, by Secretarial Agreement and in accordance with the "Guidelines and Regulations for the Classification, Classification and Assignment of Names and Numbers of the Ships of the Mexican Navy", the unit was classified as Auxiliary Vessel, type: tug., with official name: Navy Republic of Mexico Cora (ARE-04).

On 16 May 2004, the ship was attached to the Flotilla of Auxiliary Ships of the Pacific Naval Force in Manzanillo, Colima.

On 16 July 2007, she was assigned to the 6th Naval Region, with the same headquarters, by instructions of the C. Admiral Secretary of the Navy, and by 1 July 2008, when the 8th Flotilla was created, in the same port and dependent on the 6th Naval Region, according to Secretarial Agreement Number 97 dated 17 June 2008, this unit was attached to this flotilla.

She was decommissioned on June 16, 2021.

== Awards ==
The ship has a total of 8 battle stars throughout her career.

- Navy Meritorious Unit Commendation (2 awards)
- American Campaign Medal
- Asiatic-Pacific Campaign Medal (2 battle stars)
- World War II Victory Medal
- Navy Occupation Service Medal (with Asia Clasp)
- National Defense Service Medal (2 awards)
- Korean Service Medal (3 battle stars)
- Armed Forces Expeditionary Medal
- Vietnam Service Medal (3 battle stars)
- Philippines Liberation Medal (1 award)
- United Nations Service Medal
- Republic of Vietnam Campaign Medal
- Republic of Korea War Service Medal (retroactive)
