= USS Cusabo =

Tugboat of the United States Navy

History

United States
- Name: USS Cusabo
- Builder: Charleston Shipbuilding & Dry Dock Co.
- Laid down: 16 September 1944
- Launched: 26 February 1945
- Commissioned: 19 May 1945
- Decommissioned: 3 December 1946
- Stricken: 1 July 1963
- Fate: Transferred to Ecuador, stricken 1999

General characteristics
- Class & type: Achomawi class fleet ocean tug
- Displacement: 1,205 long tons (1,224 t) light; 1,646 long tons (1,672 t) full
- Length: 205 ft (62 m)
- Beam: 38 ft 6 in (11.73 m)
- Draft: 15 ft 4 in (4.67 m)
- Propulsion: Diesel-electric; 4 × General Motors 12-278A diesel main engines driving 4 × General Electric generators and 3 × General Motors 3-268A auxiliary services engines, single screw
- Speed: 16 knots (18 mph; 30 km/h)
- Complement: 8 officers, 68 enlisted men
- Armament: 1 × 3"/50 caliber gun; 2 × 40 mm guns; 2 × 20 mm guns

USS Cusabo (ATF-155) was an Achomawi class fleet ocean tug built for the United States Navy during World War II. She was the only U.S. Naval vessel to bear the name.

Cusabo was laid down 16 September 1945 by the Charleston Shipbuilding and Dry Dock Company of Charleston, South Carolina; launched on 26 February 1945; sponsored by Mrs. T.C. Reed; and commissioned at Charleston Navy Yard on 19 May 1945.

== Service history ==
Departing Charleston 30 May 1945, Cusabo sailed to Norfolk, Virginia for training in Chesapeake Bay until 25 June when she departed for Newport, Rhode Island. Picking up tows there and at Portsmouth, New Hampshire, she departed Newport on 4 July for San Diego, California arriving 27 August. She was underway again on 5 September, sailing to Pearl Harbor, Eniwetok, Guam, and San Pedro Bay, Leyte on towing duty, returning to Guam with IX-149 in tow. Cusabo remained in the Far East on towing and salvage duty at Guam, Saipan, Iwo Jima, and Eniwetok until 10 March 1946 when she proceeded to Bremerton, Washington for pre-inactivation availability and overhaul, arriving 11 May. She was placed out of commission, in reserve, in the Columbia River on 3 December 1946.

In 1962, Cusabo was removed from the Columbia River Reserve Fleet and loaned to the government of Ecuador, where she was returned to service as BAE Los Rios (RA-01). Later renamed BAE Cayambe, the ship was permanently transferred (cash sale) to Ecuador under the Security Assistance Program on 1 August 1978. The vessel continued to serve in the Ecuadorian Navy until decommissioned in 1999. The final disposition of the ship is not known.
