= USS Tolowa =

Abnaki-class tugboat

History

United States
- Name: Tolowa
- Namesake: Tolowa
- Builder: United Engineering Co.
- Laid down: 28 July 1943
- Launched: 17 May 1944
- Sponsored by: Mrs. B. D. Bales
- Commissioned: 29 December 1944
- Decommissioned: 27 January 1947
- Reclassified: ATF-116, 1944
- Stricken: 11 November 1970
- Identification: Callsign: NDRQ; Hull number: AT-116
- Honours and awards: See Awards
- Fate: Sold to Venezuela, 1 February 1962

History

Venezuela
- Name: Felipe Larrazábal
- Namesake: Felipe Larrazábal
- Acquired: 1 February 1962
- Decommissioned: 1974
- Identification: Pennant number: R-11

General characteristics
- Class & type: Abnaki-class tugboat
- Displacement: 1,589 t (1,564 long tons), standard; 1,675 t (1,649 long tons), full
- Length: 205 ft 0 in (62.48 m)
- Beam: 38 ft 6 in (11.73 m)
- Draft: 15 ft 4 in (4.67 m)
- Installed power: 1 × shaft; 3,600 shp (2,700 kW)
- Propulsion: 4 × General Motors 12-278A diesel engines; 4 × General Electric generators; 3 × General Motors 3-268A auxiliary services engines
- Speed: 16.5 knots (30.6 km/h; 19.0 mph)
- Range: 15,000 nmi (28,000 km; 17,000 mi) at 8 knots (15 km/h; 9.2 mph)
- Complement: 85 officers and enlisted
- Armament: 1 × single 3"/50 caliber gun; 2 × twin Bofors 40 mm guns; 2 × single Oerlikon 20 mm cannons

USS Tolowa (ATF-116) was Abnaki-class tugboat during the World War II. She was later sold to Venezuela as ARV Felipe Larrazábal (R-11). Her namesake is an Athabascan Native American tribe of northwestern California that formerly occupied the coast from the Klamath River to the Oregon border.

== Design and description ==
The ship is displaced 1,589 tonnes (1,564 long tons) at standard load and 1,675 tonnes (1,649 long tons) at deep load The ships measured 205 feet (62.5 m) long overall with a beam of 38 feet 6 inches (11.7 m). They had a draft of 15 feet 4 inches (4.7 m). The ships' complement consisted of 85 officers and ratings.

The ships had two General Motors 12-278A diesel engines, one shaft. The engines produced a total of 3,600 shaft horsepower (2,700 kW) and gave a maximum speed of 16.5 knots (30.6 km/h; 19.0 mph). They carried a maximum of 10 tonnes (10 long tons) of fuel oil that gave them a range of 15,000 nmi (28,000 km; 17,000 mi) at 8 knots (15 km/h; 9.2 mph).

The Abnaki class was armed with a 3"/50 caliber gun anti-aircraft gun, two single-mount Oerlikon 20 mm cannon and two twin-gun mounts for Bofors 40 mm gun.

== Construction and career ==
The ship was built at the United Engineering Co. at San Francisco, California. She was laid down on 28 July 1943 and launched on 17 May 1944. The ship was commissioned on 29 December 1944. She was re-designated as ATF-116 on 15 May 1944.

Tolowa held shakedown training in the San Diego-San Pedro area in January and February 1945. On 27 February, she got underway for the Territory of Hawaii with a barge in tow and arrived at Pearl Harbor on 12 March. Eleven days later, she proceeded via Eniwetok, in the Marshall Islands, to Ulithi, in the Western Carolines. Tolowa left Ulithi on 7 May bound for the Philippines with the concrete barge Cinnabar (IX-163) and the open lighter YC-755 in tow. She delivered her charges at Leyte on 13 May and returned to Ulithi to deliver a concrete ship and a barge to Leyte.

Joining a convoy of 12 tugs, 20 tows, and two escorts en route to Okinawa on 8 June 1945, Tolowa reached Kerama Retto on 12 June and embarked a fire-fighting team. The ship then took station off Ie Shima as an emergency salvage and fire-fighting tug. She operated in those waters until the end of hostilities in August.

On 11 September 1945, Tolowa headed for the Philippines and operated there until late in October, when she took two tows from Subic Bay to Hong Kong. She returned to Subic Bay on 2 November and, six days later, headed again for Chinese waters. After operating out of Shanghai and Tsingtao from 16 November 1945 to 1 April 1946, she called at Sasebo en route back to the Philippines. On 16 April, Tolowa began the long return voyage to the U.S. She called at Eniwetok, Kwajalein, Johnston, and Oahu before arriving at San Diego on 9 July. The ship proceeded to San Pedro the next day, remaining there until 6 August when she got underway for the east coast to be inactivated.

After a stay at New Orleans, from 12 September to 9 November 1946, Tolowa shifted to Orange, Texas, where she was decommissioned on 27 January 1947. Restored to operational condition by the sailors of the Beaumont (Texas) Naval Reserve Ship Activation Maintenance and Repair Division, Tolowa was transferred to the government of Venezuela, manned by the Beaumont reservists and 18 Venezuelan Navy sailors who would learn of their new ship during the journey to Venezuela. The ship was renamed ARBV Felipe Larrazábal (R-11).

== Awards ==
- China Service Medal
- American Campaign Medal
- Asiatic-Pacific Campaign Medal (1 battle star)
- World War II Victory Medal
- Navy Occupation Service Medal (with Asia clasp)
- Philippines Liberation Medal
