= USS Achomawi =

Tugboat of the United States Navy

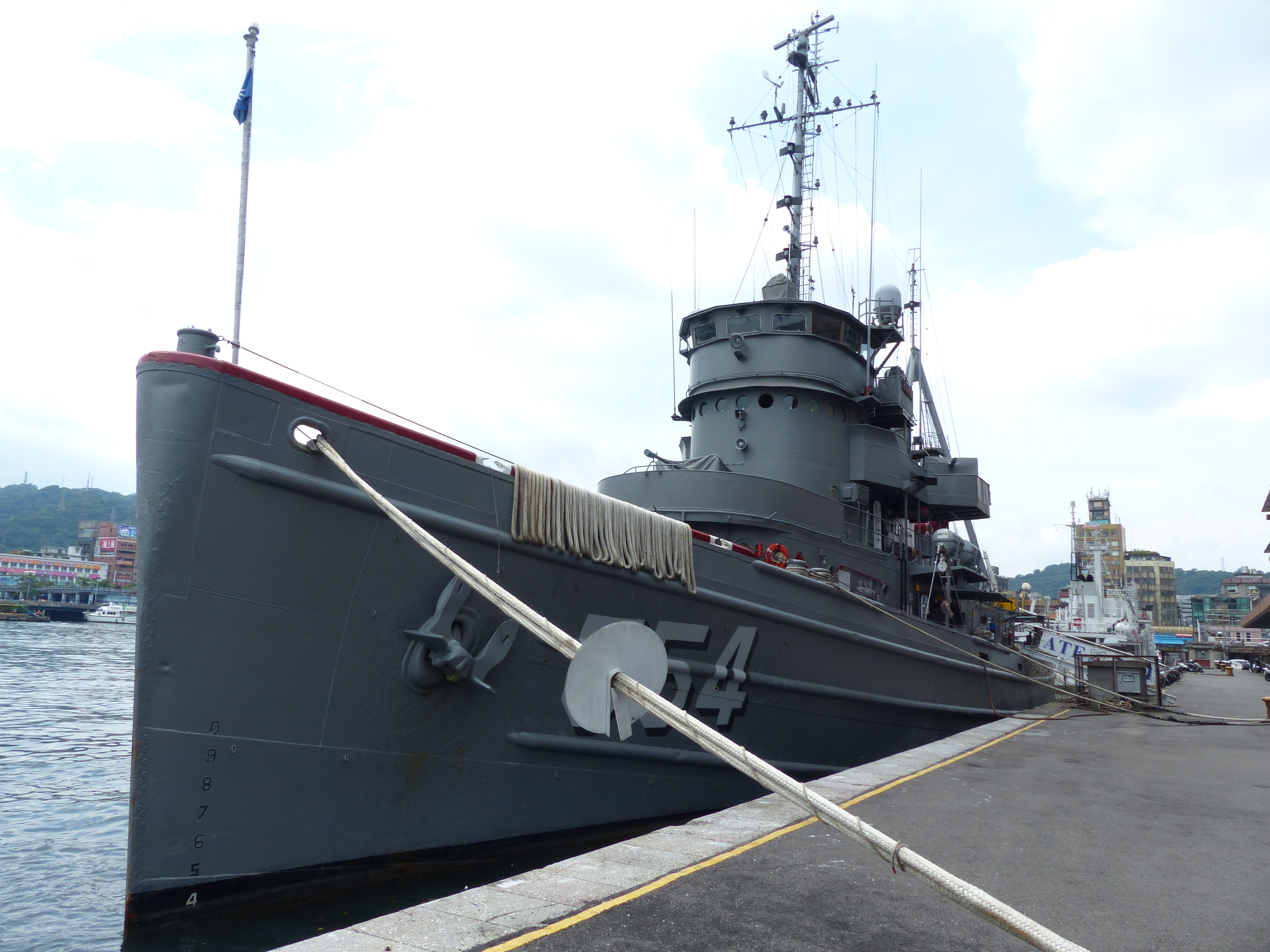
- ROCS Da Gang (ex-Achomawi) seen in 2014.

History

United States
- Name: USS Achomawi
- Ordered: 13 October 1943
- Builder: Charleston Shipbuilding & Drydock Co.
- Laid down: 15 January 1944
- Launched: 14 June 1944
- Commissioned: 11 November 1944
- Decommissioned: 10 June 1947
- Stricken: 1 September 1962
- Fate: Transferred to Taiwan in 1991

Taiwan
- Name: Da Gang; (大岡)
- Acquired: 1991
- Decommissioned: 1 July 2025
- Identification: ATF-554

General characteristics
- Class & type: Abnaki-class tugboat
- Displacement: 1,675 long tons (1,702 t)
- Length: 205 ft (62 m)
- Beam: 38 ft 6 in (11.73 m)
- Draft: 15 ft 4 in (4.67 m)
- Speed: 16.5 knots (19.0 mph; 30.6 km/h)
- Complement: 6 officers, 71 enlisted
- Armament: 1 × 3"/50 caliber gun; 2 × 40 mm guns; 2 × 20 mm guns; 2 × depth charge tracks

USS Achomawi (AT-148/ATF-148) was an Abnaki-class fleet ocean tug in the service of the United States Navy, and was named for the Achomawi tribe of Native Americans.

Achomawi was laid down as AT-148 on 15 January 1944 at Charleston, South Carolina by Charleston Shipbuilding and Drydock, redesignated ATF-148 on 15 May 1944, and launched on 14 June 1944, sponsored by Mrs. J. F. Veronee. The ship was commissioned on 11 November 1944 at Charleston Navy Yard.

== Service history ==
The tug departed Charleston on 28 November bound for the Chesapeake Bay for shakedown training. She then entered the Norfolk Navy Yard, Portsmouth, Virginia, for post-shakedown availability. Late in December, Achomawi arrived back at Charleston but soon sailed for Wilmington, North Carolina to pick up ARDC-J for towing to the west coast. The tug transited the Panama Canal late in January 1945 and continued on to San Pedro, California where she arrived on 17 February. Achomawi operated along the west coast through 3 March. On that day, she got underway from San Francisco bound for Pearl Harbor, Hawaii with two pontoon barges in tow. Upon her arrival in Hawaiian waters on 16 March, the tug commenced target towing and mooring duties in the Pearl Harbor area and remained at the task until 22 May, when she shaped a course to Okinawa with three barges in tow. She made stops at Eniwetok and Guam before reaching Okinawa on 1 July. The vessel then assisted in moving Service Division 104 from Kerama Retto to Buckner Bay, Okinawa. She set sail on 12 July with a convoy bound for Guam.

Achomawi reached Guam on 17 July and, five days later, got underway for Eniwetok. At that atoll, she assumed duty with Service Division 102 and operated there through the end of World War II in mid-August. On 15 October, she shaped a course for Tokyo, Japan. The tug arrived there 10 days later and departed Japanese waters on 9 November, bound for Ulithi. At that atoll, the tug took oil tanker USS Malvern (IX-138) in tow and got underway for the Philippine Islands. She reached Manila on 19 November and operated in the Luzon area through 6 December. Later that month, Achomawi attempted to tow three barges from Samar, Philippine Islands, to Okinawa. En route, two broke loose due to heavy seas and were lost. The third capsized due to shifting cargo and had to be destroyed. The tug finally arrived at Okinawa on 29 December. On 12 January 1946, Achomawi got underway for the west coast of the United States. She made port calls at Eniwetok, Kwajalein, Johnston Island, and Pearl Harbor. The tug finally made San Francisco on 3 March.

Achomawi departed California in early April to return to the western Pacific to support Operation "Crossroads," which involved atomic testing at Bikini Atoll. Following the Able test on 1 July, the tug attempted to take the heavily damaged Japanese light cruiser Sakawa in tow, in an effort to beach the vessel. A tow line was connected, but as Achomawi prepared to get underway the cruiser began to sink. The Sakawa threatened to pull the tug under with her own tow wire, but quick-acting sailors were able to sever the wire with an acetylene torch before damage resulted. The cruiser went to the bottom with a portion of Achomawi's tow wire still attached. Throughout the remainder of the operation the tug carried out various towing assignments between Pearl Harbor, Bikini, Eniwetok, and Kwajalein, and was released in August. Achomawi left Hawaii on 14 September, and arrived in San Francisco Bay on 2 October, where it underwent radiological decontamination.

Early in December, Achomawi received orders to proceed to the Panama Canal Zone. She touched at Balboa, Panama, on 29 December and picked up ARD-6 for towing to Jacksonville, Florida. The tug then transited the canal and reached Jacksonville on 4 January 1947. After delivering her tow, she set a course for New Orleans, Louisiana. Upon her arrival on 9 January, the ship entered preinactivation availability. Achomawi completed this in early March and got underway on 9 March for Orange, Texas. She was decommissioned there on 10 June 1947 and was laid up at Orange. Her name was struck from the Naval Vessel Register on 1 September 1962. The vessel was then transferred to the Maritime Administration and was laid up at Mobile, Alabama.

Achomawi was removed from the reserve fleet in June of 1987, and towed to Bethlehem Shipyard for repairs. She returned from the shipyard the following month. In 1991, the ship was sold to the government of Taiwan, where she entered service with the Republic of China Navy as ROCS Da Gang (ATF-554). The vessel was finally decommissioned on July 1st, 2025.
