= USS Utina =

Tugboat of the United States Navy

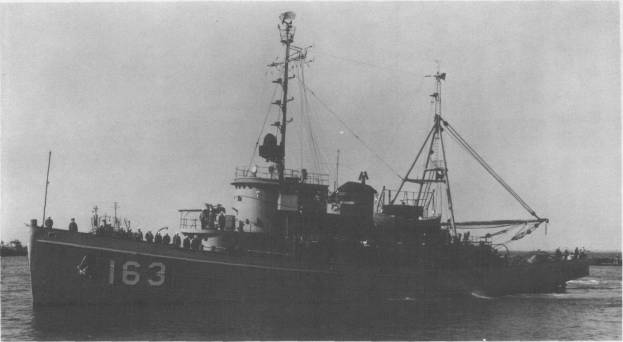
- The fleet tug Utina (ATF-163)

History

United States
- Laid down: 16 June 1945
- Launched: 31 August 1945
- Commissioned: 30 January 1946
- Decommissioned: 3 September 1971
- Honours and awards: Navy Expeditionary Medal (2-Cuba); American Campaign Medal; World War II Victory Medal; National Defense Service Medal; Armed Forces Expeditionary Medal (Cuba)
- Fate: Transferred to the Venezuelan Navy

General characteristics
- Displacement: 1,589 tons
- Length: 205 ft 0 in (62.48 m)
- Beam: 38 ft 6 in (11.73 m)
- Draught: 15 ft 4 in (4.67 m)
- Propulsion: 4 × General Motors 12-278A diesel main engines; 4 × General Electric generators; 3 × General Motors 3-268A auxiliary services engines; single screw; 3,600 shp
- Speed: 16.5 knots (30.6 km/h)
- Complement: 85
- Armament: 1 x 3 in; 2 x 40 mm; 4 x 20 mm

USS Utina (ATF-163) was an Abnaki-class of fleet ocean tug. It was named after Olata Ouae Utina (fl. 1565), a leading chief of the now-extinct Utina tribe of Timucua Indians who occupied the territory along the middle reaches of the St. Johns River in Florida near the present-day site of St. Augustine, Florida.

The Utina was laid down on 6 June 1945 at Charleston, South Carolina, by the Charleston Shipbuilding & Drydock Company; launched on 31 August 1945; sponsored by Mrs. Jonathan Yerkes; and commissioned at the Charleston Navy Yard, on 30 January 1946.

Since commissioning, the major portion of Utina's long Navy career was spent in the western Atlantic Ocean and in the West Indies. She carried out a variety of towing missions, helping damaged ships into port, towing decommissioned ships to berthing areas, towing targets for gunnery exercises, and the like. Throughout her active career, Utina was closely associated with the American naval base at Guantanamo Bay, Cuba. Right after commissioning, she conducted her shakedown training out of that port, and when she completed it, Guantanamo Bay became her home port for over five years. In 1951, she was reassigned to Norfolk, Virginia but continued to deploy each year to the base in Cuba for several weeks of operations—frequently in conjunction with the annual "Springboard" fleet exercises held in the West Indies. She was at Guantanamo Bay in February 1964 when Cuban Premier Fidel Castro cut off the base's water supply. When the United States government decided to respond by permanently severing the water link to illustrate the base's self sufficiency, Utina played an important role by bringing in Guantanamo Bay's first potable water before two large tankers could be activated for the purpose.

Throughout her quarter of a century of service with the Navy, Utina altered her routine of operations along the eastern seaboard and in the West Indies only twice. In May 1965, she embarked upon her only deployment to the 6th Fleet in the Mediterranean Sea. Her missions, however, remained the same though the emphasis shifted to target towing for 6th Fleet surface gunnery exercises. She returned to Norfolk in early October 1965 and resumed 2d Fleet services once more. Her second departure from her primary zone of operations came in June 1967 when she steamed to Iceland to assist USS Aeolus (ARC-3) in a special project. The tug returned to Norfolk on 13 July 1967 and resumed east coast-West Indies operations for the remaining four years of her career.

On 3 September 1971, Utina was decommissioned at Norfolk, and she was transferred, on a loan basis, to the Venezuelan Navy. She was commissioned as Felipe Larrazabal (R 21) and served in the Venezuelan Navy until December 1977. At that time, she was returned to the United States Navy, retransferred to Venezuela on a sale basis, and her name was struck from the Navy list—all simultaneously. As of the beginning of 1980, she was still active with the Venezuelan Navy.
