= Benner =

Benner may refer to:

- Benner (surname)
- Benner Township, Pennsylvania
- Benner, United States Virgin Islands
- USS Benner, the name of more than one United States Navy ship
