= USS Terry =

Two ships in the United States Navy have been named USS Terry for Edward A. Terry.

- The first USS Terry (DD-25) was a modified Paulding-class destroyer launched in 1909 and served in World War I. She served in the United States Coast Guard from 1924 to 1930. She was sold in 1934.
- The second USS Terry (DD-513) was a Fletcher-class destroyer launched in 1942 and decommissioned by 1947 after serving in World War II.
