= Benkner =

Benkner is a German surname. Notable people with the surname include:

- Charlotte Benkner (1889–2004), American supercentenarian
- Otto Benkner (1909–1996), German chess master

== See also ==
- Benner (surname)
