= USS Abnaki =

US Navy fleet ocean tug in service 1943-1978

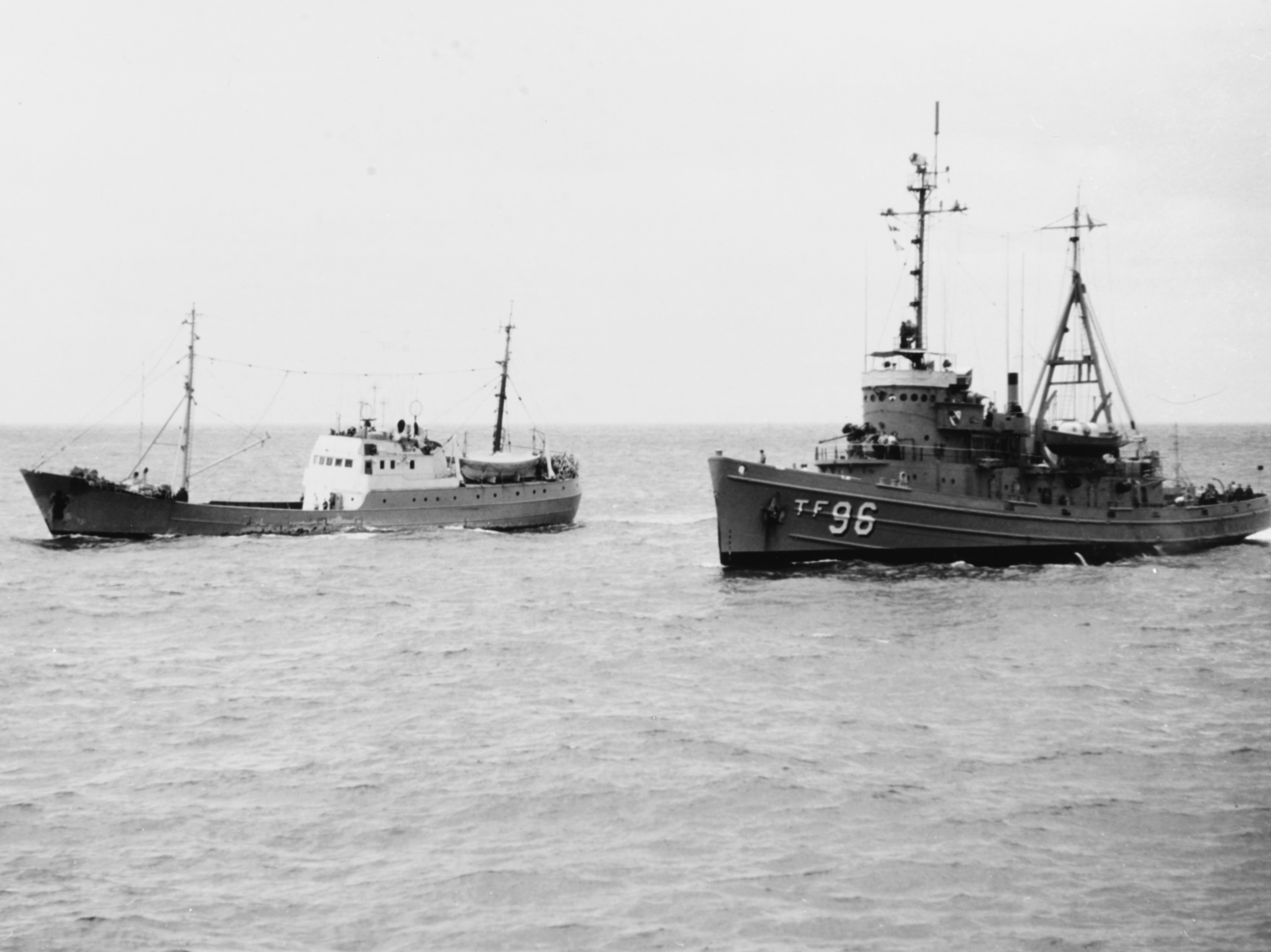
- Abnaki (ATF-96) (right) alongside a Soviet spy trawler

History

United States
- Name: USS Abnaki
- Namesake: Abenaki
- Builder: Charleston Shipbuilding & Drydock Co.
- Laid down: 28 November 1942
- Launched: 22 April 1943
- Commissioned: 25 November 1943
- Decommissioned: 30 September 1978
- Stricken: 30 September 1978
- Fate: Transferred to Mexico, 30 September 1978

Mexico
- Name: Yaqui (A-18)
- Acquired: 30 September 1978
- Status: In active service as of 2019

General characteristics
- Class & type: Abnaki-class fleet ocean tug
- Displacement: 1,240 long tons (1,260 t)
- Length: 205 ft (62 m)
- Beam: 38 ft 6 in (11.73 m)
- Draft: 15 ft 4 in (4.67 m)
- Speed: 16.5 knots (19.0 mph; 30.6 km/h)
- Complement: 85
- Armament: 1 × 3 in (76 mm) gun; 2 × 20 mm guns

Service record
- Part of: Atlantic Fleet (1943–45); Pacific Fleet (1945–78)
- Operations: World War II; Korean War; Vietnam War
- Awards: 3 battle stars (Korea); 10 battle stars (Vietnam)

USS Abnaki (ATF-96) was the lead ship of the Abnaki class of fleet ocean tugs in the service of the United States Navy, named after the Abenaki tribe of Native Americans. She was laid down on 28 November 1942 at Charleston, South Carolina by Charleston Shipbuilding & Drydock, launched on 22 April 1943, sponsored by Mrs. James Mayon Jones, and commissioned at the Charleston Navy Yard on 25 November 1943. Abnaki earned three battle stars for service during the Korean War and 10 battle stars during the Vietnam War.

== Operational history ==
=== 1944–1949 ===
The fleet ocean tug completed shakedown in Chesapeake Bay on 10 December and began operating with the Atlantic Fleet. She conducted towing operations up and down the eastern seaboard of the United States until the spring of 1944. On 12 April, she was in a collision off the Azores with the repair tug USS ATR-98 which resulted in the sinking of the latter.

On 28 May of that year, she got underway from Norfolk, Virginia, bound for Oran, Algeria. On 4 June, however, while in the vicinity of the Azores, Abnaki received orders to rendezvous with Captain Daniel V. Gallery's Task Group (TG) 22.3 built around USS Guadalcanal. That task group had just succeeded in capturing the German submarine U-505, and Abnaki was to tow her to Bermuda. She arrived there with the prize on 19 June and remained 10 days before shaping a course for New York.

The tug spent the early days of July in New York and stood out to sea on the 11th, towing two covered lighters, YF-445 and YF-447, in an Oran-bound convoy. She returned to New York on 19 August, having towed the battle damaged Free French warship Senegalaise from Oran. From 19 September to 5 December 1944, Abnaki made a round-trip voyage to Britain. During that mission, she towed barges and tank landing ships. On the return leg of that voyage, the ship made stops at Reykjavík, Iceland; and NS Argentia, Newfoundland; before returning to Norfolk. During January and February 1945, she again steamed to Oran and returned to Norfolk for repairs in preparation for duty with the Pacific Fleet.

On 24 April 1945, Abnaki passed between Capes Henry and Charles on her way to her new assignment. She arrived in the Panama Canal Zone on 9 May, transited the canal, and continued her voyage from Balboa, Panama, on the 16th with an Army dredge in tow. The tug arrived in San Diego, on 2 June and remained for five days. On the 7th, she took the dredge in tow once again and weighed anchor for the Central Pacific. After a stop at Pearl Harbor, Hawaii, the fleet tug entered the lagoon at Kwajalein Atoll in the Marshall Islands on 25 July and discharged her tow. The following day, she got underway again and proceeded to Eniwetok Atoll, also in the Marshalls.

Abnaki remained there through the end of hostilities. Early in October, she shifted north to join the forces occupying Japan. That mission lasted through the end of 1945 and the first six months of 1946. On 6 July, the fleet tug departed Japanese waters and proceeded to China. Following a stop at Okinawa en route, she arrived at Shanghai on 16 July and began operations between that port and Tsingtao in support of American forces in China. On 24 October, she received orders sending her to the Mariana Islands. She arrived at Guam during the second week in November and provided towing service between the Marianas and the Admiralties through the end of the year. After February 1947, the Commander, Service Force, Pacific Fleet, expanded her sphere of operations to include ports in Japan and in China. The latter ports, however, were closed to her after the communist revolution in 1949.

=== 1950–1959 ===
The tug continued to operate in Far Eastern waters while the communist tide swept over the Asian mainland engulfing not only China but also the northern half of Korea where the Soviet occupation forces had established a puppet regime under Kim Il Sung on 1 May 1948. Just over two years later, that event led to the invasion of South Korea by communist forces from the north late in June 1950. Though American units, under the auspices of a Soviet-boycotted United Nations, moved into the breach quickly, Abnaki did not enter the zone of combat operations for over a year. In July 1951, however, she joined Service Division (ServDiv) 31 in providing mobile logistics support to the United Nations naval task forces engaged in the conflict. Abnaki's direct support for United Nations forces in Korea ended in February 1952, and she resumed service in Western and Central Pacific waters somewhat removed from the designated combat zone.

Save for an overhaul or two at the Pearl Harbor Naval Shipyard, her service in the Far East and in the waters of the Central Pacific continued unbroken until 1955. After participating in evacuation of Nationalist Chinese troops and civilians from the Tachen Islands in March of that year, the tug served in the Orient for a little over three months more. On 15 July 1955, she got underway from Sasebo, Japan, for Hawaii. En route to Hawaii, the fleet tug encountered an Army ship, FS-179, in distress and took her in tow. The two ships arrived at Pearl Harbor on 1 August. For the next 17 months, Abnaki operated from that base in the mid-Pacific operating area, voyaging only as far as such outlying islands as Midway and Johnston.

Her itinerary changed late in February 1957 when she steamed to San Francisco, to take USS Springfield in tow for the first leg of her journey to the east coast for her conversion to a guided missile cruiser. The two ships departed San Francisco on 2 March and arrived at Rodman in the Panama Canal Zone on the 29th. There, Abnaki turned her charge over to USS Nipmuc and headed back to Oahu for operations in Hawaiian waters through the summer. On 17 September, the fleet tug set sail for the Far East and provided support services for units of the 7th Fleet until returning to Pearl Harbor on 27 February 1958 and resuming mid-Pacific operations. On 18 November, she stood out of Pearl Harbor for another deployment with the 7th Fleet in the western Pacific.

Upon her return to Hawaii midway through 1959, Abnaki took up the familiar chore of towing various types of vessels between locations in the islands and to the more distant Johnston and Midway.

=== 1960–1969 ===
On 6 February 1960, she stood out of Pearl Harbor and shaped a course just a few degrees west of north. The tug arrived at Adak, Alaska, on the 14th and assisted in the salvage of USS Kodiak before sailing for Oahu on 5 May. Arriving in Pearl Harbor on 12 May, the ship resumed her mid-Pacific duties. On 3 April 1961, she embarked upon another deployment to the western Pacific. After four months of towing duties between such ports as Sasebo and Yokosuka in Japan, Ream in Cambodia, Naha and Buckner Bay at Okinawa, and Subic Bay in the Philippines, Abnaki returned to Pearl Harbor on 8 August.

Following a leave, upkeep, and repair period, she once again began mid-Pacific duties early in September and continued the task through the year's end. On 24 January 1962, she departed Pearl Harbor and arrived in Adak on 1 February. The fleet tug conducted local operations in the Aleutians until 20 April when she shaped a course for Seattle, Washington. Following a six-day layover there, Abnaki headed for Oahu on 4 May and arrived at Pearl Harbor on the 12th. That summer, between 23 July and 7 September, she again deployed to the Aleutians. A return to mid-Pacific operations came early in September and lasted until she moved to the western Pacific on 21 May 1963.

That four-month tour of duty consisted of the normal round of port visits and of towing services to units of the 7th Fleet. Similarly, her return to Pearl Harbor brought the familiar towing and salvage operations in the mid-Pacific operating area. That routine was broken only once, during late January and early February 1964 when she made a round-trip voyage to San Francisco. Abnaki spent much of 1964 in operations out of Pearl Harbor and concluded the year preparing to deploy to the western Pacific.

During the latter part of 1964, American involvement in South Vietnam began to escalate as a result of the Gulf of Tonkin Incident. That development heralded a change in the nature of Abnaki's western Pacific deployments over the ensuing eight years. She departed Pearl Harbor with a dredge in tow on 4 January 1965 bound for Yokosuka, Japan. The dredge sank on the 19th; and, the following day, Abnaki entered Subic Bay in the Philippines. She operated locally out of Subic Bay until 5 March when she sailed for Vietnam. The tug served in Vietnamese waters as tender for a squadron of minecraft and conducted some patrols. She completed that assignment on 31 March and headed back to Subic Bay where she arrived on 4 April.

After eight days of upkeep at Subic Bay, she put to sea for a second tour of duty in Vietnamese waters. That mission concluded, Abnaki shaped a course for Hong Kong on 30 April for a liberty call from 3 to 8 May. Following a visit to Yokosuka from 14 to 20 May, the ship began the voyage back to Hawaii and arrived at Pearl Harbor on 1 June. After a 16-day leave and upkeep period, she resumed mid-Pacific operations out of her home port.

Following a three-month overhaul, three weeks of refresher training, and almost two months of local operations, Abnaki departed Pearl Harbor on 29 March 1966 for the western Pacific. She stopped at Guam along the way, before arriving in Nagasaki, Japan, late in April. The fleet tug towed an Army power barge from Nagasaki to Naha, Okinawa, for 12 days of upkeep. She departed that port on 19 May and arrived in Da Nang, South Vietnam, on the 22d. Between 23 May and 20 June, Abnaki operated in the South China Sea in support of 7th Fleet ships assigned to Yankee Station and made an overnight stop at Da Nang on 20 and 21 June before getting underway for Hong Kong. The ship remained in Hong Kong from 25 June to 2 July and then headed for Subic Bay for an upkeep period which occupied her for the bulk of July. On 26 July, she put to sea for Yokosuka and – after a stop at Buckner Bay, Okinawa – arrived at that port on 5 August. The tug stood out of Yokosuka a week later, towing LSSL-102, and moored at the Army pier at Sattahip, Thailand, on the 29th. She remained in Thailand, making one liberty call at Bangkok, until 22 September. Getting underway that day, the tug shaped a course for Kaohsiung, Taiwan. After nine days of upkeep at Kaohsiung, she set sail for Guam on 8 October and picked up her final tow of the deployment there on 16 October before steaming on toward Vietnam. She anchored off Vung Tau on Navy Day 1966, transferred her charge, and then got underway on 28 October to return home via Sasebo and Yokosuka.

The beginning of 1967 saw her resume local operations between Hawaii and the outlying islands. During the first three weeks in May, the fleet tug made a round-trip voyage to Seattle, Wash. After returning, Abnaki carried out mid-Pacific towing duties until mid-August. On the 18th, she exited Pearl Harbor on her way back to the Far East. Following stops at Guam and Subic Bay, the ship arrived at Danang on 15 September, took up duty on trawler surveillance patrol on Yankee Station, and spent most of the following month shadowing the Soviet trawler Ampermetr. Relieved on 15 October, Abnaki proceeded to Kaohsiung, Taiwan. On the way, however, she encountered Typhoon "Carla" and had to detour. Later, she went to the assistance of an Army tug towing a crane. When the Army vessel suffered mechanical difficulties that forced her to cut loose the crane to save herself, Abnaki brought the crane in safely. Next, she spent six days of rest and relaxation at Hong Kong before returning to Subic Bay for a three-week upkeep period.

Abnaki departed Subic Bay on 25 November and set course for Vietnam. On the 27th, the fleet tug joined USS Bolster and USS Ute near Đức Phổ, South Vietnam, to assist in salvaging USS Clarke County. After much labor, they refloated the tank landing ship on 1 December. On 7 December, she relieved USS Chanticleer as trawler surveillance unit. Relieved of that mission on the 23d, Abnaki steamed to My Tho where she picked up a tow on the 27th and shaped a course for Sasebo. However, the fleet tug stopped at Kaohsiung, Taiwan, from 6 to 19 January 1968 to have the patch on the hull of the barge she was towing replaced. Continuing on, Abnaki towed her charge into Sasebo on the 24th. On 30 January, she stood out of Sasebo on her way back to Pearl Harbor.

The ship reentered her home port on 12 February and began over a month of post-deployment stand down. From 18 March to 8 July, the ship resumed her familiar mid-Pacific duties. On 8 July, she entered the Pearl Harbor Naval Shipyard for an overhaul which lasted until 25 October. For the next month, she completed refresher training and preparations for overseas movement. On 26 November, Abnaki returned to sea, again bound for the Far East.

The voyage west brought stops at Guam and Subic Bay – where Abnaki delivered floating crane YD-127 – before she reentered the combat zone off Vietnam. The tug arrived at Da Nang on 31 December 1968. On the morning of New Year's Day 1969, she departed Danang to pick up garbage lighter YG-52 at Subic Bay. The ship arrived there on the 3rd, departed the next morning with her charge in tow, and delivered it at Da Nang on the 8th before heading back toward Subic Bay that same day. En route, she received orders to Naha, Okinawa, to assist in the salvage of a grounded tank landing ship. She completed that mission on 19 January, reentered Subic Bay on the 24th, and headed back toward Danang on the 29th. The ship arrived there on the 31st and, on 1 February, put to sea for a 21-day tour of duty on Yankee Station. Late in the month, she towed USS Asheville from Cam Ranh Bay to Yokosuka. In March, she visited Tsoying, Taiwan, to train members of the Taiwanese Navy in salvage techniques. After a liberty call at Hong Kong early in April, the ship returned to Subic Bay until late in the month. She got underway on the 26th bound for Guam with the medium auxiliary floating dry dock USS Resourceful in tow. She and her charge reached Apra Harbor on 15 May; and, on the 16th, Abnaki continued on toward Hawaii.

=== 1970–1978 ===
The fleet tug arrived in Pearl Harbor on 28 May and began post-deployment stand down and a restricted availability. She commenced local operations on 1 July and that assignment continued into 1970. Late in January of that year, Abnaki headed for the western Pacific and arrived in Subic Bay toward the end of the second week in February. Although most of that deployment was devoted to operations out of Subic Bay followed by visits to Sasebo and Hong Kong, the fleet tug made a voyage into the Vietnam combat zone when she visited Da Nang late in May. In mid-June, she headed back to Pearl Harbor where she arrived at the end of the month for operations out of that port into the spring of the following year.

On 29 April 1971, she pointed her bow westward once more to deploy with the 7th Fleet in the Far East. She made a stop at Guam before arriving in Subic Bay in mid-May. Later in the month, she voyaged to Vung Tau, South Vietnam, apparently to deliver a tow, because she departed the Vietnamese port on the same day she arrived. The Vietnam War does not appear to have played a major role in her 1971 deployment since she made only a few brief stops there—mostly at Vung Tau. She spent a large proportion of her time in and around Subic Bay and made port visits to Hong Kong; Singapore; and Ream, Cambodia. Following the grounding of the USS Regulus on Kau I Chau Island, Hong Kong, on the night of 16–17 August 1971 during Typhoon Rose, Abnaki was the first U.S. Navy vessel to arrive on scene to begin salvage operations. Late in September, Abnaki stood out of Subic Bay for Apra Harbor, Guam, on her way back to Pearl Harbor. After an eight-day layover at Apra Harbor, she continued her voyage to the Oahu base where she arrived on 20 October to resume Hawaiian operations.

Towing and training missions occupied her time until she put to sea on 21 August 1972 to rejoin the 7th Fleet in the western Pacific. Towing one Philippine minesweeper, escorting another, and making stops at Midway and Guam, Abnaki took over a month to make the voyage to Subic Bay. She arrived there on 28 September and remained until 3 October when she returned to sea to tow a floating crane to Vietnam. She arrived in Da Nang on 7 October, delivered her charge, and began duty as the standby salvage ship there. That duty involved staying in Da Nang harbor during the day to provide salvage services and putting to sea each night because of the threat posed by Viet Cong sapper-swimmers. She concluded that assignment on 20 October and then visited Hong Kong and Kaohsiung, Taiwan. The tug returned to Subic Bay in mid-November and then ended the year visiting such ports as Ream, Singapore, and Bangkok.

During the latter portion of this deployment, Abnaki made no voyages to Vietnam. Instead, she operated exclusively out of Subic Bay, breaking that routine but once during the second half of January 1973 for missions to Kaohsiung and Tsoying in Taiwan. On 20 February, she departed Subic Bay to return home. Along the way, the tug made stops at Guam and Kwajalein before reentering Pearl Harbor on 13 March. Renewed operations out of Pearl Harbor lasted until 25 June 1973 when she got underway for a new home port – San Diego, California. The ship stood into her new base on 13 July and spent the remainder of the year either in port at San Diego or making tows to various points along the California coast. That employment continued into the New Year 1974. On 19 February, the ship entered the Fellows & Stuart Shipyard for a seven-month overhaul.

Abnaki completed the overhaul on 19 September and returned to San Diego the next day. Refresher training followed in October; and, at the beginning of November, she resumed west coast operations out of San Diego. During December 1974 and the first part of January 1975, she prepared for overseas duty. On the 11th, the tug weighed anchor to begin her voyage to the Far East. She made only one stop – at Pearl Harbor from 20 to 22 January – before arriving in Subic Bay on 9 February. Two days later, she got underway to participate in Readex 1–75 conducted in the South China Sea. Following that exercise, Abnaki visited Yokosuka and Sasebo in Japan. In March, she made a four-day liberty call at Hong Kong followed by a visit to Singapore. She returned to Subic Bay early in April but, on the 10th, got underway for Vung Tau where she salvaged the cargo door of a C-5A cargo plane which had crashed shortly after takeoff from Tan Son Nhut Air Base. After participation in Operation Frequent Wind – the evacuation of Saigon – Abnaki returned to Yokosuka on 15 May for three weeks of upkeep before heading for the Marianas on 8 June. The tug arrived at Guam on 13 May, loaded supplies destined for the natives of the Marshall Islands, and put to sea again on the 16th. After dropping the supplies off at several of the smaller atolls in the Marshalls, she continued on via Pearl Harbor to San Diego where she arrived on 13 July.

Operations along the California coast kept the tug busy until the beginning of October when she began an extended restricted availability at San Diego. The new year began with the ship still in port at San Diego. However, she embarked upon her first tow on 2 January 1976 and remained active – shuttling tows between various California ports for the first seven months of 1976. On 7 August, the ship left San Diego to join a Fijian minesweeper at Seattle, Wash., for the voyage to Fiji. The two ships got underway on 16 August and set a course for Pearl Harbor where they arrived on 24 August and remained a week for repairs to the minesweeper's communications equipment. En route to Suva, Fiji, Abnaki assisted a civilian auxiliary sailboat grounded on a reef at Palmyra Island and towed it to Christmas Island. Abnaki and the Fijian minesweeper arrived at Suva, Fiji, on 17 September. The American ship remained at Suva until the 21st when she got underway for Subic Bay. En route, she stopped at Kapingamarangi Atoll to drop off cargo for the natives and at West Fayu Island to investigate a suspected violation of territorial waters by a Japanese fishing trawler. She finally arrived in Subic Bay on 4 October.

The fleet tug conducted operations out of Subic Bay over the following month. On 7 November, she stood out of Subic Bay bound for Borneo. She made a five-day visit at Kuching and then got underway on 16 November for Puerto Princesa on Palawan in the southwestern Philippines. Abnaki returned to Subic Bay on 22 November and remained there until the 26th when she shaped a course for Hong Kong. At the crown colony from 29 November to 9 December, she combined business with pleasure, serving as station submarine service ship while portions of her crew enjoyed liberty ashore. The ship returned to Subic Bay on 11 December and remained until the 19th. On the latter day, she shaped a course for the Marianas. Abnaki arrived at Guam on Christmas Eve day 1976. On 29 December, she headed for Kwajalein to embark Rear Admiral Carroll, Commander, Naval Forces, Marianas, for transportation to Kusaie Atoll for its independence celebration. The round-trip voyage from Kwajalein to Kusaie took from 2 to 6 January 1977. On 8 January, Abnaki sailed to Guam where she picked up two-yard craft to tow to Pearl Harbor. Departing Guam on 12 January 1977, she dropped off her charges at Pearl Harbor on 13 February, resumed her voyage to the west coast the following day, and reached San Diego on 22 February.

Abnaki spent the remainder of her Navy career operating along the west coast. Following post-deployment stand down and an extended availability, in May, she resumed towing and other operations along the California coast including surveillance operations, other fleet services, and training evolutions. At the beginning of 1978, Abnaki towed a cable-laying ship to Panama. During that voyage, she also made a call at Esmeraldas, Ecuador, before returning to San Diego on 12 February 1978. Normal operations along the west coast occupied her time from mid-February until April. The first week in April brought fleet exercises followed by a resumption of fleet services. During the first half of June, Abnaki participated in another series of fleet exercises and then resumed her usual west coast missions.

On 15 August 1978, Abnaki began preparations for decommissioning and transfer to the Mexican Navy. She was placed out of commission on 30 September 1978 and was simultaneously transferred to the Mexican Navy. Her name was struck from the Navy list that same day, and she was commissioned in the Mexican Navy as Yaqui (A-18), Lt. Guttierez .

== Awards ==
- American Campaign Medal
- European-African-Middle Eastern Campaign Medal
- Asiatic-Pacific Campaign Medal
- World War II Victory Medal
- Navy Occupation Medal with "ASIA" clasp
- China Service Medal
- National Defense Service Medal with star
- Korean Service Medal
- Vietnam Service Medal
- Armed Forces Expeditionary Medal
- United Nations Korea Medal
- Korean War Service Medal
- Republic of Vietnam Campaign Medal
