= USS Benner =

USS Benner has been the name of more than one United States Navy ship, and may refer to:

- USS Benner (DE-551), a destroyer escort cancelled in 1944 prior to construction
- USS Benner (DD-807), a destroyer in commission from 1945 to 1970
