= Edward Terry =

Edward Terry may refer to:

- Edward A. Terry (1839–1882), American naval officer
- Edward O'Connor Terry (1844–1912), English actor
- Edward Terry (author) (1590–1660), English writer
- Edward Terry (politician) (1840–1907), Australian politician
- Ted Terry (1904–1967), Australian athlete and footballer
- Ted Terry (politician) (born 1983), American politician in the state of Georgia
