= Benner (surname) =

Benner is a surname. Notable people with the surname include:

- Carl Benner, American engineer
- Dietrich Benner, German educationalist
- Emmanuel Benner (1836–1896), French artist
- Erica Benner, British political philosopher
- George Benner (1859–1930), American congressman
- Hugh Benner (1899–1975), American religious figure
- Jean Benner (1836–1906), French artist
- Joseph Sieber Benner (1872–1938), American spiritual writer
- Katie Benner, American reporter
- Maikel Benner (born 1980), Dutch baseball player
- Michael Paul Benner (1935–1957), British recipient of the George Cross
- Stanley G. Benner (1916–1942), United States Marine Corps officer and Silver Star recipient
- Steven A. Benner (born 1954), American chemist
