= United States lightship Chesapeake (LV-116) =

Museum ship

Chesapeake (LS-116)
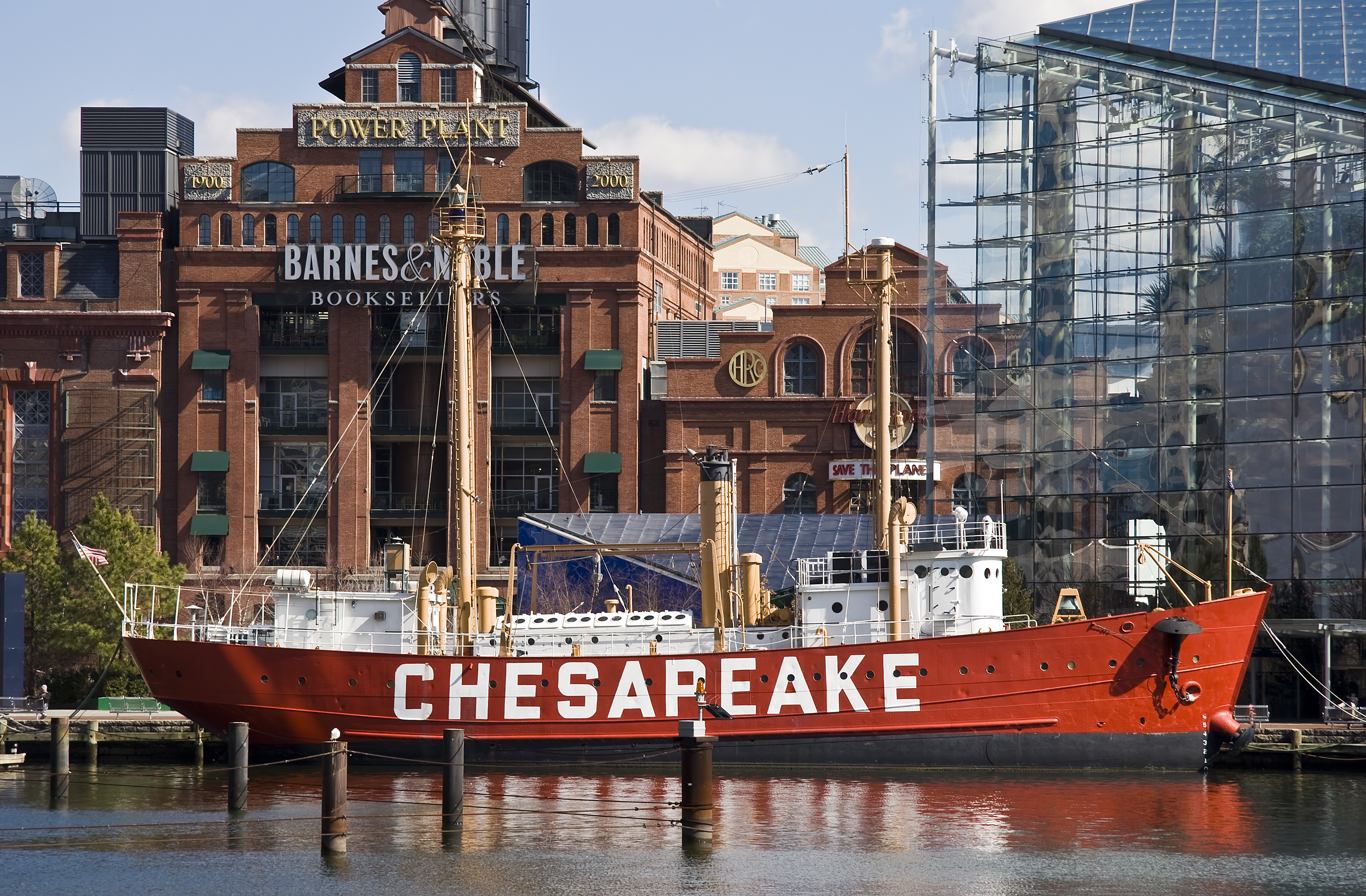
- Lightship Chesapeake (LV 116) at the Pratt Street Power Plant

History

United States
- Owner: United States Lighthouse Service (1930–1939); United States Coast Guard (1939–c.1971); National Park Service (c.1971–)
- Builder: Charleston Drydock & Machine Co., Charleston, South Carolina
- Cost: $274,434
- Laid down: 6 February 1929
- Launched: 22 October 1930
- Acquired: 23 June 1930
- Commissioned: 1930
- Decommissioned: 6 January 1971
- Reclassified: WAL-538 April 1950; WLV-538 January 1965
- Status: Museum ship

General characteristics
- Type: Lightship
- Displacement: 130 long tons (132 t)
- Length: 133 ft 3 in (40.61 m)
- Beam: 30 ft (9.1 m)
- Draft: 13 ft 9 in (4.19 m)
- Propulsion: Diesel-electric, 350 hp (261 kW)
- Speed: 9 knots (17 km/h; 10 mph)
- Complement: 10 seamen, 5 officers, 1 cook
- Armament: 2 × 20 mm rapid fire machine guns (World War II only)
- Chesapeake (lightship)
- U.S. National Register of Historic Places
- U.S. National Historic Landmark
- Location within Baltimore Location within Maryland
- Location: Inner Harbor, Baltimore, Maryland
- Coordinates: 39°17′8.5″N 76°36′31.6″W
- Area: 0.1 acres (0.040 ha)
- Built: 1930
- Architect: Green, Lewis, II; Charleston Drydock & Machine Co.
- NRHP reference No.: 80000349

Significant dates
- Added to NRHP: 1 August 1980
- Designated NHL: 20 December 1989

United States lightship Chesapeake (LS-116/WAL-538/WLV-538) is a museum ship owned by the National Park Service and on a 25-year loan to Baltimore City, and is operated by Historic Ships in Baltimore Museum in Baltimore, Maryland. A National Historic Landmark, she is one of a small number of preserved lightships. Since 1820, several lightships have served at the Chesapeake lightship station and have been called Chesapeake. Lightships were initially lettered in the early 1800s, but then numbered as they were often moved from one light station to another. The name painted on the side of lightships was the short name of the Light Station they were assigned to and was the daytime visual aspect of the many Aids to Navigation on board lightships. The United States Coast Guard assigned new hull numbers to all lightships still in service in late 1940s, but the Coast Guard did not enforce the use of the new hull designation and number, WAL-538, until January 1951. In January 1965 the Coast Guard further modified all lightship hull designations from WAL to WLV, so Chesapeake became WLV-538.

Chesapeake had many redundant systems in order to maintain her position through most storms. The 5000-pound (2300 kg) main anchor was backed up by a second 5000-pound anchor attached to the side of the ship. The 30,000 candela main light was also backed up with a secondary lamp and the Radio Locator Beacon also had a backup system. On more than one occasion (in 1933, 1936, and 1962) the main anchor chain snapped during violent storms and the ship had to use her engines to stay in place and drop her second anchor.

== History ==
The light vessel was built at Charleston Drydock & Machine Co. in Charleston, S.C. for $274,434.00; the keel was laid on 6 February 1929, the ship was launched on 22 October 1930 and delivery was on 23 June 1930. She was one of six ships in the LS 100 class of lightships, which included LS 100, LS 113, LS 114, LS 115, LS 116 and LS 117. The first light station assignment for the LS 116 was the Fenwick Shoal station off the coast of Delaware, marked FENWICK. In 1933 Lightship 116 was then assigned to the Chesapeake Light Station, about 17 miles offshore from the entrance to the Chesapeake Bay. The ship was also absorbed into the Coast Guard in 1939, as were all vessels in the United States Lighthouse Service.

Service in the US Coast Guard meant a pay cut for the civilian sailors who agreed to enlist in the Coast Guard aboard Chesapeake and other Lightships. This also required the crew to pass Coast Guard physical exams and wear uniforms. A Coast Guard officer, usually a Warrant Officer Bos'n, was also placed in command of the lightships, which meant a more efficient, orderly and strict operation. It did also, however, mean better supplies and training reached the crew. During World War II, Chesapeake was based out of Sandwich, Massachusetts, where she served as an Examination and Guard vessel at the north entrance of the Cape Cod Canal and helped protect the important port of Boston. As WW2 ended, she was returned to the CHESAPEAKE light station.

In the 1960s with the introduction of automated buoys as well as permanent light stations, the lightship fleet was slowly mothballed. Chesapeake left her station at the mouth of the Chesapeake Bay in September 1965 when she was replaced by a large, manned light tower similar to an oil rig. This station was helicopter accessible and was easier to maintain than a lightship. Eventually the light tower was fully automated. Eight lightships were built after Chesapeake.

Chesapeake's last tour of duty was at the mouth of the Delaware Bay from 1966 to 1970 where she was named "DELAWARE". A large 104 ton buoy beacon replaced her at this station in 1970. After leaving Delaware Bay, Chesapeake was moored in Cape May, New Jersey, until her decommissioning on 6 January 1971. She was then transferred to the National Park Service and used as a seagoing environmental education classroom until she was handed over to the city of Baltimore in 1982. In 1988 Chesapeake became part of the Baltimore Maritime Museum, now the Historic Ships in Baltimore museum and is moored at Pier 3 in Baltimore's Inner Harbor. She is open for touring after a paid admission to the museum. Chesapeake was listed on the National Register of Historic Places on 1 August 1980 and was designated a National Historic Landmark on 20 November 1989. Chesapeake and her companions are major contributing elements in the Baltimore National Heritage Area.

=== Name and station assignments ===
- FENWICK, Fenwick Island Shoal, DE (1930–1933)
- CHESAPEAKE, Chesapeake, VA (1933–1942)
- LS-116, Examination and Guard Vessel World War II Sandwich, MA (1942–1945)
- CHESAPEAKE, Chesapeake, VA (1945–1965)
- DELAWARE, Delaware Bay, DE (1966–1970)

== Gallery ==
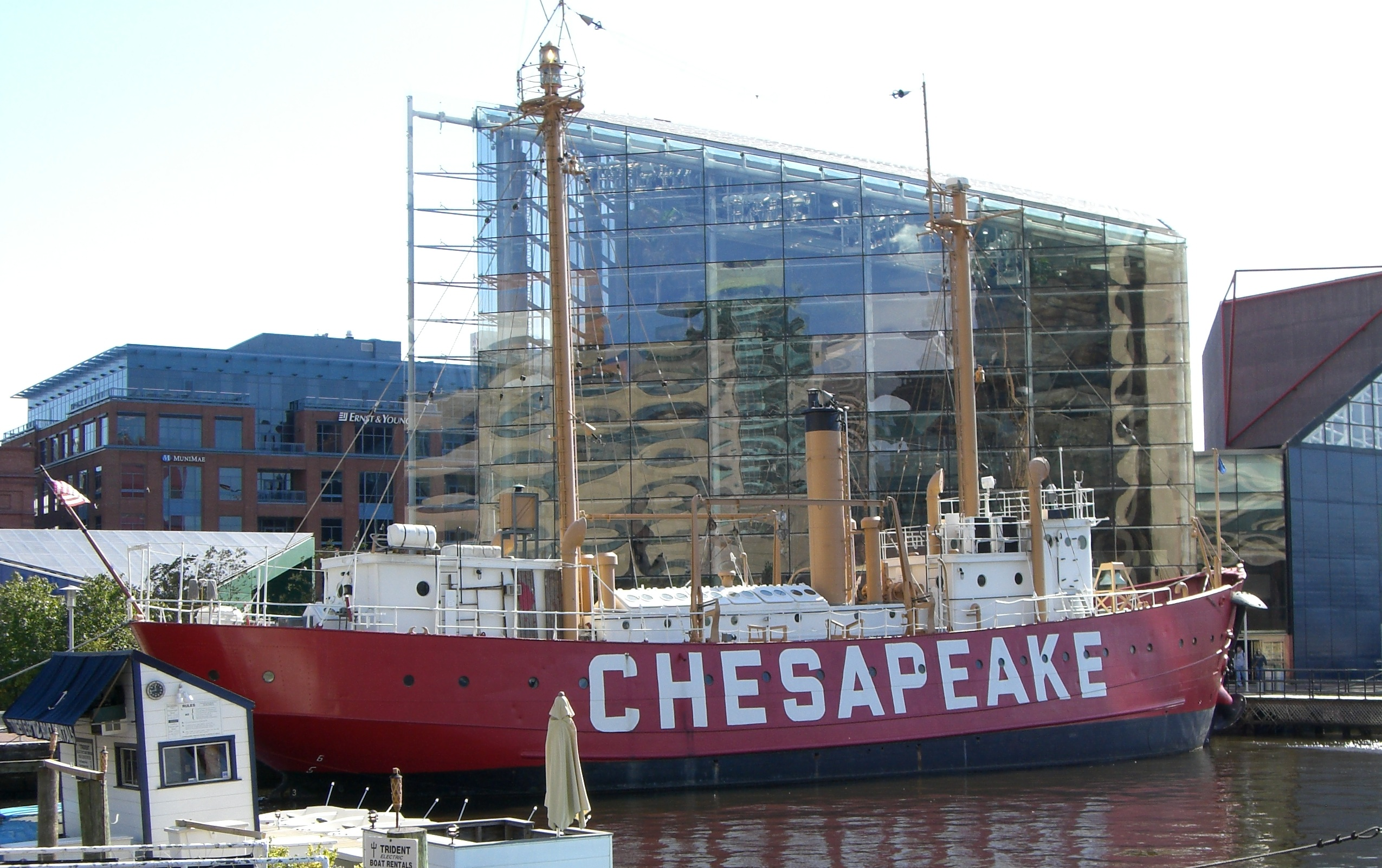
Lightship Chesapeake in Baltimore's Inner Harbor

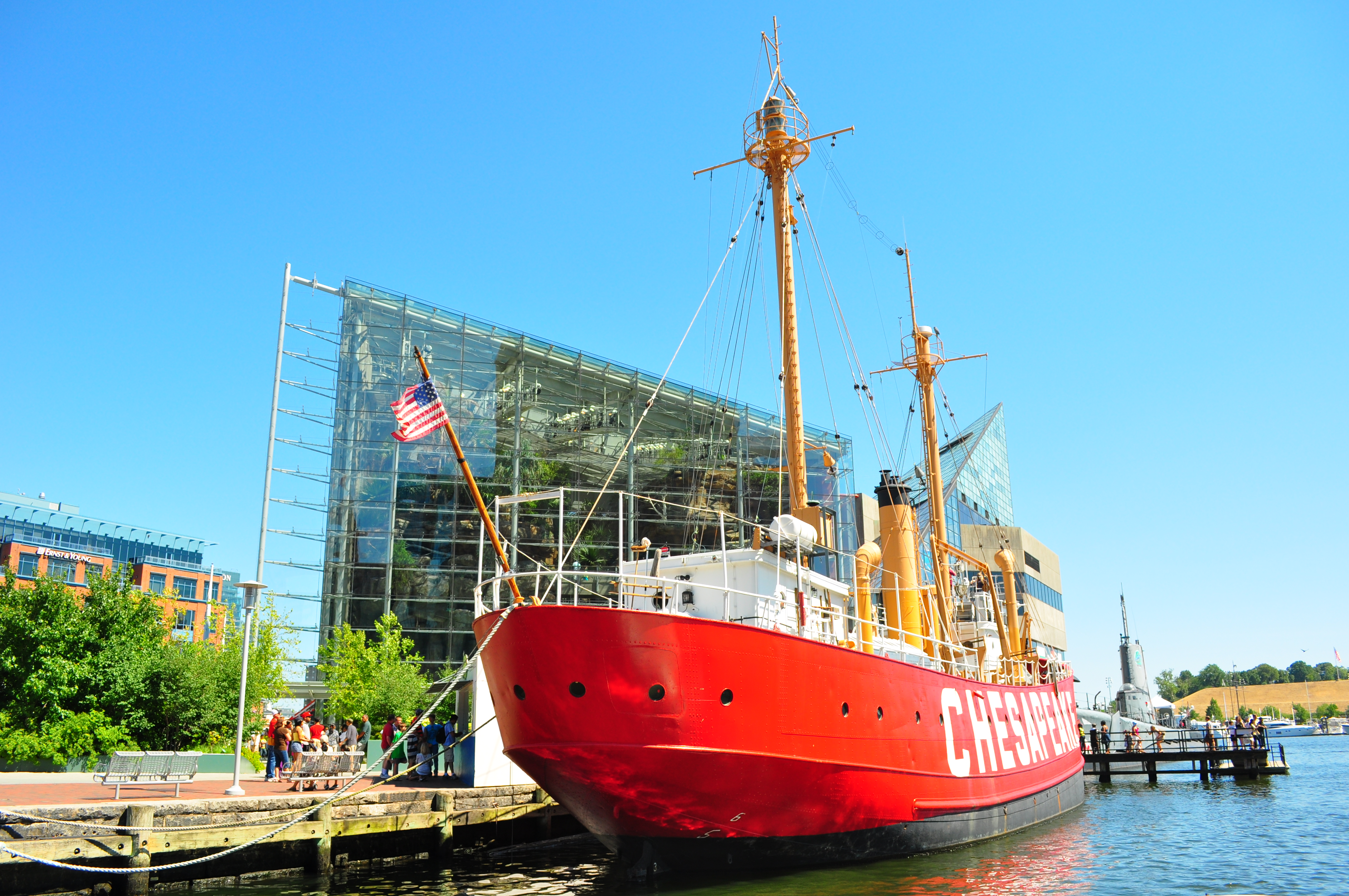

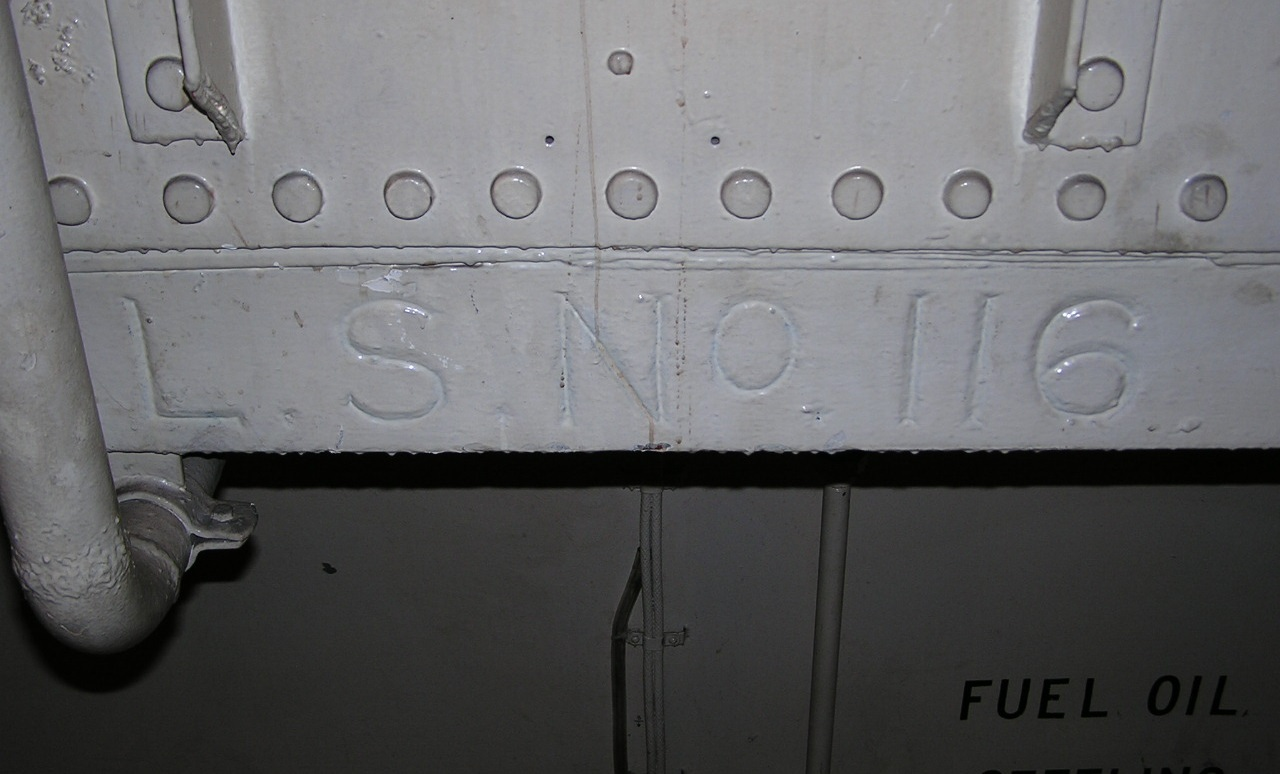
This is a photo of an overhead beam in the Engine Room of the Lightship Chesapeake showing her original hull number was LS 116, not LV 116.

== See also ==
- List of National Historic Landmarks in Maryland
- National Register of Historic Places listings in Central Baltimore

== Resources ==
- Delgado, James P. (June 30, 1989). "National Register of Historic Places Registration Form / Lightship No. 116" (pdf). National Park Service.
  - "Accompanying Photos" (pdf). National Park Service.
- "Vessel Designation: LV 116 / WAL 538". U.S. Coast Guard Lightships & Those of the U.S. Lighthouse Service. United States Coast Guard.
- Interviews with LV-116's former crew members and the first commanding officer's daughter, conducted by NPS historian Frank Hebblethwaite.
