= USS Terry (DD-25) =

Paulding-class destroyer

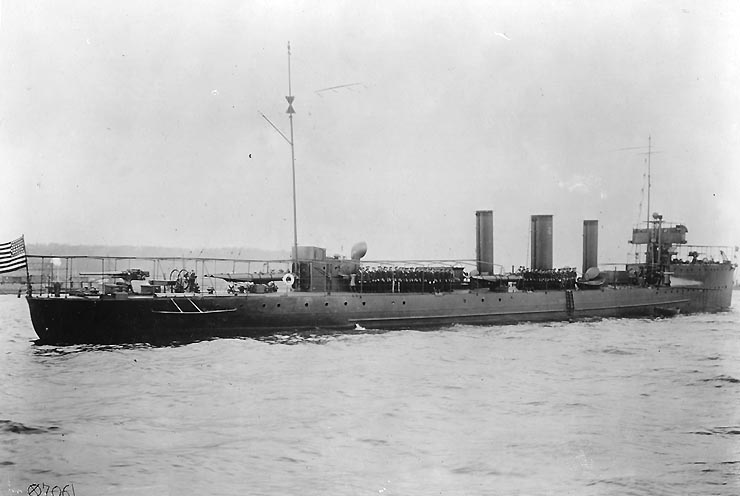
- USS Terry (DD-25) in harbor with her crew standing in formation on deck, prior to World War I.

History

United States
- Name: Terry
- Namesake: Commander Edward A. Terry
- Builder: Newport News Shipbuilding Company, Newport News, Virginia
- Cost: $639,289.34
- Laid down: 8 February 1909
- Launched: 21 August 1909
- Sponsored by: Mrs. Reynold T. Hall
- Commissioned: 18 October 1910
- Decommissioned: 13 November 1919
- Stricken: 28 June 1934
- Identification: Hull symbol:DD-25; Code letters:NUI
- Fate: Transferred to the United States Coast Guard; Scrapped in 1934

United States
- Name: Terry
- Acquired: 7 June 1924
- Commissioned: 30 June 1925
- Decommissioned: 18 October 1930
- Identification: Hull symbol:CG-19
- Fate: Transfer back to United States Navy, 18 October 1930

General characteristics
- Class & type: Paulding-class destroyer
- Displacement: 742 long tons (754 t) normal; 887 long tons (901 t) full load
- Length: 293 ft 10 in (89.56 m)
- Beam: 27 ft (8.2 m)
- Draft: 8 ft 4 in (2.54 m) (mean)
- Installed power: 12,000 ihp (8,900 kW)
- Propulsion: 4 × boilers; 3 × Parsons Direct Drive Turbines; 3 × shafts
- Speed: 29.5 kn (33.9 mph; 54.6 km/h); 30.24 kn (34.80 mph; 56.00 km/h) (Speed on Trial)
- Complement: 4 officers 87 enlisted
- Armament: 5 × 3 in (76 mm)/50 caliber guns; 6 × 18 inch (450 mm) torpedo tubes (3 × 2)

USS Terry (hull number DD-25) was a modified Paulding-class destroyer in the United States Navy during World War I, and later in the United States Coast Guard, designated CG-19. She was the first ship named for Edward A. Terry, and the first ship commanded by future Fleet Admiral and Chief of Naval Operations Ernest J. King.

Terry was laid down on 8 February 1909 at Newport News, Virginia, by the Newport News Shipbuilding Company, launched on 21 August 1909, sponsored by Mrs. George Henry Rock, and commissioned on 18 October 1910, Lieutenant Commander Martin E. Trench in command.

== United States Navy ==
=== Pre-World War I ===
Following trials off the east coast, Terry joined the Atlantic Fleet Torpedo Flotilla in winter operations in Cuban waters. She conducted both torpedo exercises with the flotilla and general maneuvers with the Fleet as a whole. In 1911 Terry made the first airplane rescue at sea, saving the life of James McCurdy 10 miles from Havana, Cuba. The routine of winter maneuvers in the Caribbean alternated with spring and summer operations along the New England coast continued until November 1913, when she arrived at Charleston, South Carolina for overhaul.

Soon after entering Charleston Navy Yard, Terry was placed in reserve. Though still in reserve after her overhaul was completed, Terry continued to be active. During 1914, she patrolled the coast of Florida, and by February 1915, she was back in Cuban waters for winter maneuvers. That summer, Terry steamed as far north as Newport, Rhode Island to conduct another round of torpedo exercises. Upon completion of the mission, she returned to her base at Charleston.

By 1 January 1916, the torpedo boat destroyer was operating with a reduced complement destroyer division. On the 31st, she cruised with units of the Atlantic Fleet to Key West, Florida. In May, she steamed to Santo Domingo. On 10 June, while maneuvering in the inner harbor at Puerto Plata, she struck a reef and settled until the greater part of the main deck was submerged. On the 13th, under the supervision of the commanding officer of Sacramento, Terry's officers and men joined the staff of a wrecking company in salvage operations. The warship was refloated on 26 June, temporarily repaired by 7 July, and returned to Charleston Navy Yard on 15 July.

=== World War I ===
America's entry into World War I saw Terry undergoing extensive repairs at Charleston. Upon completion, she began patrolling under Lieutenant John F. Shafroth Jr. along the Atlantic coast and escorting merchantmen bound for Europe. In January 1918, Terry put to sea for operations with the destroyer force based at Queenstown, Ireland. There, she escorted convoys through the submarine-infested waters surrounding the British Isles. Her tour of duty at Queenstown was a relatively peaceful, though rigorous, one. While she never sighted a German U-boat nor engaged in combat operations, on one voyage she escorted a convoy which lost one ship to a submarine. On another occasion, 19 March 1918, she assisted Manley with casualties after that destroyer was damaged by an accidental depth charge explosion.

== United States Coast Guard ==
In December 1918, Terry returned to the United States, and after 11 months of extremely limited service, she was decommissioned at Philadelphia Navy Yard on 13 November 1919.

She remained there until she was transferred to the Coast Guard on 7 June 1924. Based in New York City, she served as part of the Rum Patrol.

She served in the Coast Guard until 18 October 1930, when she was returned to the Navy and restored on the Navy list in a decommissioned status, listed as a "vessel to be disposed of by sale or salvage." On 2 May 1934, Terry was sold for scrapping. Her name was struck from the Naval Vessel Register on 28 June 1934.
