= USS Terry (DD-513) =

Fletcher-class destroyer

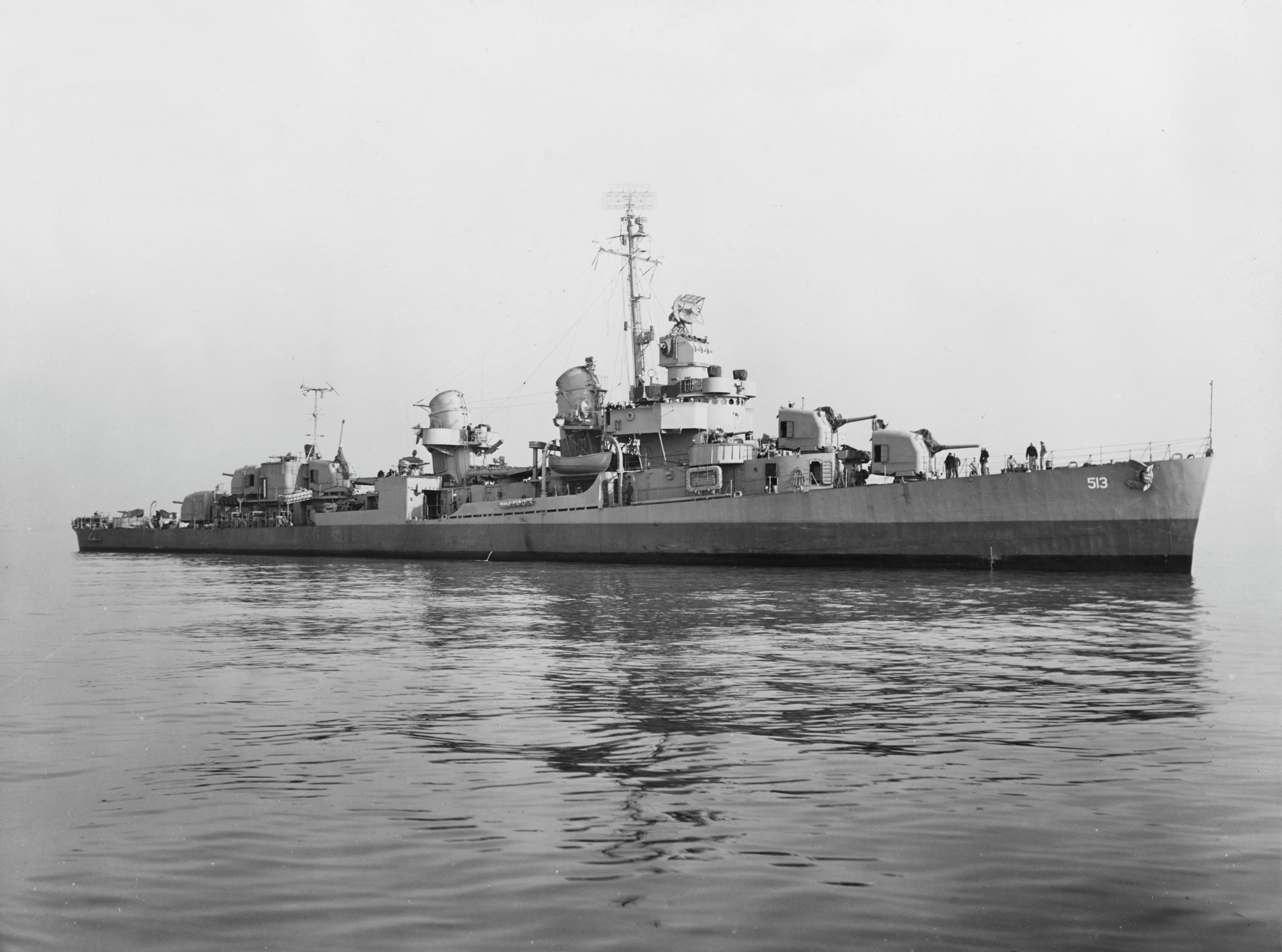
- USS Terry (DD-513)

History

United States
- Namesake: Edward A. Terry
- Builder: Bath Iron Works
- Laid down: 8 June 1942
- Launched: 22 November 1942
- Commissioned: 26 January 1943
- Decommissioned: 11 July 1947
- Stricken: 1 April 1974
- Fate: Transferred to Peru 26 July 1974 for spare parts

General characteristics
- Class & type: Fletcher-class destroyer
- Displacement: 2,050 tons
- Length: 376 ft 6 in (114.7 m)
- Beam: 39 ft 8 in (12.1 m)
- Draft: 17 ft 9 in (5.4 m)
- Propulsion: 60,000 shp (45 MW); 2 propellers
- Speed: 35 knots (65 km/h; 40 mph)
- Range: 6500 nmi. (12,000 km) at 15 kt
- Complement: 336
- Armament: 5 × single Mk 12 5 in (127 mm)/38 guns; 5 × twin 40 mm (1.6 in) Bofors AA guns; 7 × single 20 mm (0.8 in) Oerlikon AA guns; 2 × quintuple 21 in (533 mm) torpedo tubes; 6 × single depth charge throwers; 2 × depth charge racks

USS Terry (DD-513), a Fletcher-class destroyer, was the second ship of the United States Navy to be named for Commander Edward A. Terry (1839–1882).

Terry was laid down at Bath, Maine, on 8 June 1942 by the Bath Iron Works; launched on 22 November 1942; sponsored by Mrs. Charles Nagel Jr., and commissioned at the Boston Navy Yard on 26 January 1943.

== Battle of the Atlantic, April – July 1943 ==
After outfitting at Boston in February and shakedown training off Guantanamo Bay, the destroyer returned to Boston for post-shakedown availability. On 2 April, she shifted from Boston to Norfolk. Two days later, she headed north to NS Argentia, Newfoundland, in the screen of a convoy. Terry arrived there on the 8th and departed the following day. She stopped at Portland, Maine, on the 11th to refuel and, the following day, commenced antisubmarine operations off the northeastern coast of the United States.

On 18 April, she had a run-in with a German U-boat. First, Terry dropped a pattern of depth charges on a sound contact and waited for results. Then her sonar detected a torpedo running straight for her bow. Terry turned to avoid it, and the deadly missile passed astern. Soon thereafter, the destroyer sighted an oil slick and debris and ended the encounter by joining USS Brownson (DD-518)) in a futile search for the damaged enemy submarine. On the 20th, the warship put into Narragansett Bay for a few hours to take on fuel and supplies before resuming patrol. She later rescued survivors of a downed Army bomber and put them ashore at New York City on 23 April.

Following another brief patrol and a visit to New York City, Terry departed the United States on 1 May in the screen of Task Force 67, bound for North Africa. After a stop at Bermuda, the destroyer headed singly for Casablanca, where she arrived on the 12th and commenced a week of repairs and battle practice. On the 19th, she steamed out of Casablanca and headed homeward in company with USS Texas (BB-35). Arriving at the Boston Navy Yard on 31 May, the destroyer entered dry dock. She was refloated on 9 June and got underway the same day. She stopped briefly at Casco Bay, Maine, and at Norfolk, Va., before continuing on to the British West Indies. The destroyer reached Trinidad on 20 June and spent the ensuing nine days on antisubmarine patrols and in gunnery practice. She departed Trinidad on 29 June, bound for the Philadelphia Navy Yard. Almost at her destination on 3 July, she was ordered to report to Norfolk where she arrived the same day.

== Solomon Islands campaign, September 1943 – April 1944 ==
Three days later, she put to sea in company with USS Yorktown (CV-10), USS Dashiell (DD-659), and USS McKee (DD-575). The three warships reached the Panama Canal on 10 July. Two days later, Terry, Yorktown, McKee, and USS Sigsbee (DD-502) set out for Hawaii. They arrived in Pearl Harbor on the 24th, and Terry conducted exercises in the waters around Hawaii until mid-August. On 19 August, she departed Pearl Harbor for the southwestern Pacific. Steaming with USS Fullam (DD-474) and USS Guest (DD-472), she stopped at Suva, Fiji Islands, before arriving in Havannah Harbor, Efate Island, in the New Hebrides on 5 September. After a visit to Nouméa, New Caledonia, she returned to Efate briefly before taking up duty in the Solomon Islands late that month.

Terry entered the torturous Solomons campaign late, in mid-September 1943. She saw only the final five months of the campaign and participated in its last two amphibious operations. Her primary missions during her tour of duty in the Solomons consisted of escorting supply convoys and interdicting Japanese barge traffic to keep the enemy from evacuating his bypassed and otherwise useless troops. Infrequently, she also left the Solomons area to visit New Caledonia, either escorting ships there or for availability.

Her first combat in the Solomons came early in October. On the 2d, she was ordered up "the Slot" between Choiseul and Kolombangara along with USS Foote (DD-511), USS Converse (DD-509) and USS Jenkins (DD-447). Their mission was to intercept barges loaded with enemy evacuees from Kolombangara. Before opening the attack, she and her three sister destroyers waited for the enemy to move well out from the island. They sighted their targets at 21:14. The four destroyers turned a wide circle to starboard and, five minutes later, opened fire.

Terry fired one salvo, and her fire-direction radar went out. Three minutes later, she ceased fire and commenced repairs. Swiftly, her radarmen restored "sight" to her guns, and Terry resumed her barrage almost immediately. The enemy boats returned fire, but Terry and the other destroyers pounded them until they disappeared from the radar screen. A bit later, more barges, escorted by a Wakatake-class destroyer, hove into sight. Terry and her colleagues fired a salvo and launched a spread of torpedoes. The Japanese returned fire, but the torpedoes forced them to cease fire and alter course toward the American warships. Meanwhile, the American destroyers, who had also ceased gunfire in order to launch torpedoes, opened up again with their five-inch batteries. Enemy return fire grew increasingly weaker as they suffered heavily from the American cannonade. Terry claimed a straddle on her first salvo, and flashes on the enemy destroyer—thought to be return fire at first—indicated that Terry's salvoes were hitting home. Apparently, Destroyer Division 8's guns had overwhelmed the enemy from the beginning. When the action ended, Terry set course for the Gizo Strait.

Terry resumed escort and patrol duties until late in the month. By the beginning of November, she was steaming north again, escorting USS George Clymer (APA-27), USS Hunter Liggett (APA-14) and USS President Jackson (APA-18) to Empress Augusta Bay for the Bougainville assault. On 1 November, the day preceding the landings at Cape Torokina, she and Fullam fended off an enemy air attack. The gun crews of the little convoy knocked down two of the intruders and scattered the rest. Early the following morning, the troops landed. Terry opened fire at 05:45 and continued to support the assault forces throughout the day. The destroyer cleared the area on 3 November and returned south to Florida Island off Guadalcanal.

For the next three months, Terry resumed her routine of escorting supply convoys and conducting patrols. She visited Bougainville often and patrolled the Russell and Treasury Islands. The destroyer also made two voyages to Nouméa. During the first two weeks in December, she had two scrapes with the enemy. On the 3rd, while steaming from Guadalcanal to Bougainville, she came under an almost simultaneous pair of attacks—one from below and one from above. A Japanese submarine fired two torpedoes at her, but she combed their wakes as they passed astern. At almost the same time, enemy fighters swooped in on her. They made several unsuccessful approaches and, after losing one plane to Terry's antiaircraft gunners, abandoned their attack. Eleven days later, she was again making the Bougainville run, and another Japanese plane attempted to attack. Terry's gunfire taught him better manners, and he retired rapidly.

Following more patrols, escort duty, and an availability at Nouméa, Terry was ordered to cover the last major amphibious operation of the Solomons campaign. She departed Purvis Bay on 13 February 1944, in company with USS Braine (DD-630) and USS Warrington (DD-383). During the landings on 15 February, the three destroyers opened up on an enemy plane, but had to cease fire when he was intercepted by a Marine Corps fighter who "scratched" him. Later, Terry and a group of LSTs discouraged another Japanese plane, a dive bomber, from pressing home an attack. He remained at extreme range until deciding to clear the area. The destroyer left the Green Islands on 21 February and returned to Tulagi.

Terry's next target was the large Japanese base at Rabaul on New Britain in the Bismarck Archipelago. She stood out of Tulagi on 23 February, refueled in the Treasuries, and reached Rabaul just before dawn on the 25th. Her main battery pumped shells into the enemy shore installations in the Vunapore area for 23 minutes. By the time she cleared, at about 03:00, several explosions had engulfed the area in a raging fire visible 20 miles out to sea. Her division commander cancelled further bombardment in order to sweep the area of Duke of York Island for a downed pilot. At the conclusion of a futile search, she steamed to New Georgia.

Terry remained in the Southwest Pacific theater for another three months. She screened the task group which carried out the unopposed seizure of Emirau Island on 20 March; then resumed normal patrols and escort duty. On 2 April, she rescued the survivors of a downed B-24. After a liberty call at Sydney, Australia, early in May, she steamed to Efate, where she arrived on the 13th. For the remainder of the month, she conducted exercises with Battleship Division 3, comprising USS Idaho (BB-42), USS New Mexico (BB-40), and USS Pennsylvania (BB-38).

== Mariana Islands campaign, June – August 1944 ==
Terry ended her tour of duty in the Southwest Pacific area early in June 1944 and joined the Central Pacific march. She departed Efate on the 2d with Task Group 53.14 (TG 53.14) bound for the Marshall Islands. At Kwajalein Atoll, she joined Admiral Raymond A. Spruance's awesome 5th Fleet. On the 10th, she sortied from the lagoon with elements of that fleet and headed for the Marianas. The first two objectives of the Marianas campaign were Saipan and Tinian. Terry was assigned to the Tinian portion of the operation. Her task unit had the dual responsibility of silencing enemy guns on northern Tinian and of rendering Ushi Point Airfield useless. She opened fire around 11:21 on the morning of 14 June, caused two large explosions, started several fires, and destroyed a radio tower—all at the airfield. That night, she delivered night harassing fire along the west coast of the island.

On the 15th, she returned to bombarding Ushi Point Airfield. Later that day, she and USS San Francisco (CA-38) went to the aid of the troops ashore and silenced a Japanese mortar battery that had been responsible for a number of American casualties. Late in the afternoon, after an inconclusive brush with two Japanese planes, Terry retired with her task unit to protect the transports to the south. Before dawn on the 16th, the destroyer joined the screen of battleships Idaho and Pennsylvania and helped them pound Orote Peninsula on Guam for two hours.

That same day, Admiral Spruance began to concentrate his forces for the imminent Battle of the Philippine Sea. Terry was one of the destroyers detached from the screen of Rear Admiral Jesse Oldendorf's bombardment group to beef up TF 58's antiaircraft defenses. She joined the screen of TG 58.3 to protect USS Enterprise (CV-6), the veteran of the battle of Midway, along with Vice Admiral Marc Mitscher's flagship, USS Lexington (CV-16), USS Princeton (CVL-23), and USS San Jacinto (CVL-30).

Steaming just out of range of the American planes, the Japanese played cat and mouse with the 5th Fleet for three days, but Spruance declined to take the bait. Finally, on the 19th, the Japanese launched their attack. The first swarm of enemy raiders never made it to the American ships, and Terry did not sight a Japanese plane until 11:57 when four of them tried to come in over her quarter. The first, a dive domber, managed to lay his egg before crashing. The following three torpedo bombers—were not nearly so successful. They made themselves perfect targets approaching low across the destroyer's bow. Terry's gunners teamed up with those of the other ships of the screen to splash each one in succession, before he had an opportunity to release his torpedo. For the remainder of the day, Terry saw only unidentified planes at extreme range. The only further excitement occurred just after 13:00, when she was rocked by an underwater explosion believed to have been caused by the depth charge of a downed plane.

The Battle of the Philippine Sea, nicknamed the "Great Marianas Turkey Shoot", destroyed the remnants of Japanese carrier-based air power. The occupation of Saipan and Tinian continued unimpaired. Terry operated with TG 58.3 until the 22d, when it was apparent that the Japanese were defeated and in full retreat. From that day, 22 June, to 12 July, Terry patrolled off Saipan and prowled for submarines. On one occasion, she dropped a pattern of 11 depth charges, but scored no kill. She cleared the Marianas and, on 15 July, entered Eniwetok lagoon. The destroyer patrolled the anchorage against submarines until 17 July when she got underway to return to the Marianas with the Guam invasion force.

The destroyer reached Guam on 22 July, the day after the initial landings, and supported the troops ashore until 10 August. First, she alternated night illumination fire with antisubmarine patrols. Later, she delivered call fire under the direction of spotters stationed ashore. Throughout this period, she delivered night harassing fire and guarded against enemy submarines. On her last day in the Marianas, 10 August, she stood radar picket duty and then sailed for Hawaii.

After a stop at Eniwetok, the warship reached Pearl Harbor on 21 August. There, she made repairs and loaded supplies while her crew enjoyed a bit of shore leave. On 15 September, Terry stood out of Pearl Harbor bound for Eniwetok, where she arrived on the 30th. Three days later, she departed in the escort of a Ulithi-bound task unit, arriving on 13 October. From there, the destroyer headed back to the United States for overhaul at the Mare Island Navy Yard.

She completed overhaul on 13 December and conducted drills along the coast until the 18th, when she headed west in company with USS Missouri (BB-63). After a brief stop at Pearl Harbor, Terry continued her voyage west and rejoined the 5th Fleet at Eniwetok on 5 February. Two days later, she sortied in the screen of the Iwo Jima assault force.

== Battle of Iwo Jima, February – March 1945 ==
On the morning of 16 February, the destroyer rendezvoused with a group of minesweepers about nine miles south of Iwo Jima. A little after 10:00, she opened up on enemy gun emplacements in an effort to protect the minesweepers while they cleared the approaches to the beaches. At about 14:32, a Japanese 4 inch gun managed to straddle Terry. She rang up speed to 25 knots (46 km/h) and lurched ahead while the enemy laid a barrage in her wake. Her 5 inch guns loosed their own salvoes which quickly silenced the offender. Thanks to Terry's gunners, the minesweepers completed their task just after 16:00 without losses.

The destroyer cleared the island for the night but returned the following day and resumed counterbattery fire. After the landings on 19 February, she supported the troops ashore with gunfire during the day and screened the ships of Task Force 54 (TF 54) during the night.

At 02:45 on the morning of 1 March, Terry was assisting USS Capps (DD-550) in a search for a Japanese submarine, when a low enemy torpedo plane approached her starboard bow. It dropped its torpedo about 1,000 yards from Terry. The recognition officer spotted the intruder at precisely that moment and yelled out "Torpedo Away". Terry leaped ahead at flank speed and came hard right. The torpedo passed harmlessly, 50 yards astern. By 07:20, Terry was heading for a screening station north of the island. As she passed Kitano Point on the northern coast of Iwo Jima, an enemy battery opened fire and got the destroyer's range immediately. Terry responded with her main battery. Her high speed and radical maneuvers did not spoil the enemy's aim and, although eventually silenced, the battery scored a direct hit on the destroyer's starboard main deck. The starboard engine stopped, and Terry lost steering control and telephone communications.

Terry continued steaming with her port engine while USS Pensacola (CA-24), USS Nevada (BB-36), and some destroyers put the shore battery out of action. Ships and boats swarmed to Terry's aid. Medical personnel and repair crews came aboard in surprisingly short order. Her wounded received emergency treatment on board, then were transferred to hospital ships. Terry headed for the southern coast of Iwo Jima where she laid to for two days while undergoing emergency repairs. On 3 March, she cleared the Volcano Islands on the first leg of a long voyage back to the United States.

After interim repairs at Saipan and stops at Eniwetok and Pearl Harbor, she returned to the Mare Island Navy Yard. During the next two months, she received permanent repairs and conducted drills along the California coast. On 13 June, she headed south and briefly conducted exercises in the San Diego area, before escorting USS Wasp (CV-18) to Hawaii. On 11 July, Terry, Wasp, and USS Benner (DD-807) departed Pearl Harbor to rendezvous with TF 38. For the remaining weeks of the war, she screened the fast carriers during the final raids on the Japanese home islands.

During the months immediately following the end of the war, Terry operated in the waters off Japan. She conducted patrols and acted as a courier for the occupation forces. On 1 November, she pointed her bow eastward and headed for home. After a stop at Pearl Harbor, she continued on to San Diego, Calif., where she arrived on 20 November.

For just over a year, Terry remained active with the Pacific Fleet, operating out of San Diego. In January 1947, the destroyer was placed out of commission and berthed with the San Diego Group, Pacific Reserve Fleet. Terry spent the remainder of her Navy career in reserve, first at San Diego, then at Long Beach, and finally at Bremerton, Wash. Her name was struck from the Navy list on 1 April 1974. She was sold to Peru 26 July 1974, and cannibalized for spare parts.

== Honors ==
Terry received seven battle stars for her World War II service.
