= USS Resourceful =

AFDM-3-class dry dock of the United States Navy

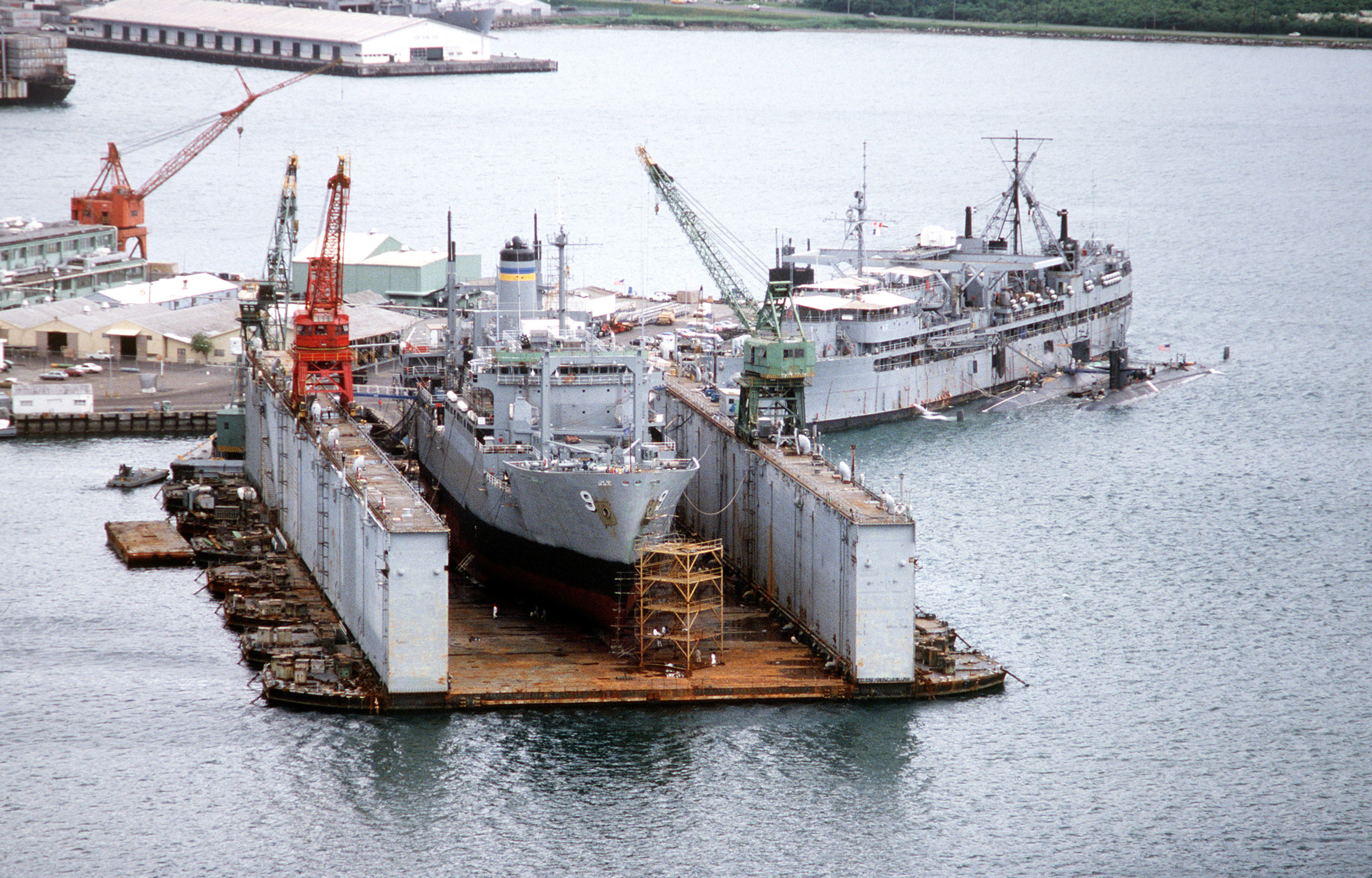
- USS Resourceful and USNS Spica

History

United States
- Name: Resourceful
- Namesake: Resourceful
- Builder: Everett Pacific Shipbuilding Co.
- Acquired: 1 February 1943
- Commissioned: February 1943
- Decommissioned: 22 August 1997
- Reclassified: AFDM-5, 1945
- Stricken: 22 August 1997
- Home port: Subic Bay
- Identification: Callsign: NBGY; Hull number: YFD-21
- Motto: Alta Et Sica; (High and Dry)
- Honors and awards: See Awards
- Fate: Donated to Subic Drydock Co., 1999; Sunk in Subic Bay, 2018

General characteristics
- Class & type: AFDM-3-class floating drydock
- Displacement: 7,000 t (6,889 long tons)
- Length: 552 ft 10 in (168.50 m)
- Beam: 124 ft 0 in (37.80 m)
- Draft: 7–15 ft (2.1–4.6 m)
- Installed power: 1,600 hp (1,193 kW)
- Speed: 22.9 knots (42.4 km/h; 26.4 mph)
- Capacity: 18,000 t (17,716 long tons)
- Complement: 4 officers, 146 enlisted

USS Resourceful (AFDM-5), (former YFD-21), was a AFDM-3-class floating dry dock built in 1943 and operated by the United States Navy.

== Construction and career ==
YFD-21 was built at the Everett Pacific Shipbuilding Shipyard, in Everett, Washington in 1943. She was commissioned in February 1943.

Assigned to the Pacific Fleet, USS Chickasaw (AT-83) departed Seattle, Washington, on 11 March 1943 for Pearl Harbor, Territory of Hawaii, towing the floating dry dock YFD-21, and arrived on 30 March 1943. Draco towed YFD-21 from Seattle by way of Pearl Harbor to Espiritu Santo, arriving 5 May 1943. On 4 July 1945, USS Wildcat (AW-2) shifted to YFD-21 for the remainder of her repairs. In 1945, the unnamed dry dock was re-designated AFDM-5. USNS Safeguard (T-ARS-50) added section G of AFDM-5 to her tow and continued on to Pearl Harbor on 29 July 1946, in company with three YTBs.

During the Vietnam War, AFDM-5 was recommissioned and in 1962, was given the motto "Alta Et Sica", which translates to "High and Dry". She was based in Subic Bay for the rest of her career. After a short period drydocked in AFDM-5 at Subic Bay, the USS Benner (DD-807) sailed to Hong Kong for rest and recreation on the 31 January 1967. USS Albatross (MSC-289) entered the floating dry dock on the 15th and, by 25 October 1967, was underway for Sasebo. USNS Corpus Christi Bay (T-ARVH-1) was in the floating drydock in 1968. USS Grasp (ARS-24) made another dry dock period but this time inside the AFDM-5, in late September 1968. On 26 April 1969, the USS Abnaki (ATF-96) got underway bound for Guam with AFDM-5 in tow.

USS Sanctuary (AH-17) was dry docked inside AFDM-5 in 1970. In 1979, she was finally named Resourceful.

On 1 January 1987, USNS Spica (T-AFS-9) and USNS Catawba (T-ATF-168) were dry docked inside Resourceful. Later in the same year, USNS Silas Bent (T-AGS-26) was also dry docked.

In early 1990s, USS Kinkaid (DD-965) was being repaired on board the dry dock. On 19 April 1992, Resourceful was towed to Yokosuka after the closure of the U.S. Naval Base Subic Bay. On 22 August 1997, Resource was decommissioned for the last time and stricken on the same day. She would then be transferred to the Local Redevelopment Agency (LRA), in the Philippines on 6 April 1999.

The dry dock has kept the name AFDM-5 and provided repair services around the Subic Bay Freeport Zone. In 2012, MV Logos Hope was dry docked inside AFDM-5. From 30 October 2017 to 15 February 2018, BRP Ramon Alcaraz (PS-16) was dry docked inside of her. From 26 March to 26 April 2018, she repaired MV Lorcon Bacolod. In late 2018, the dry dock was seen sunk in port until it was removed in late 2021.

== Awards ==
- American Campaign Medal
- Asiatic-Pacific Campaign Medal
- World War II Victory Medal
- National Defense Service Medal
- Philippines Liberation Medal
