= MS Carolinian =

Ship

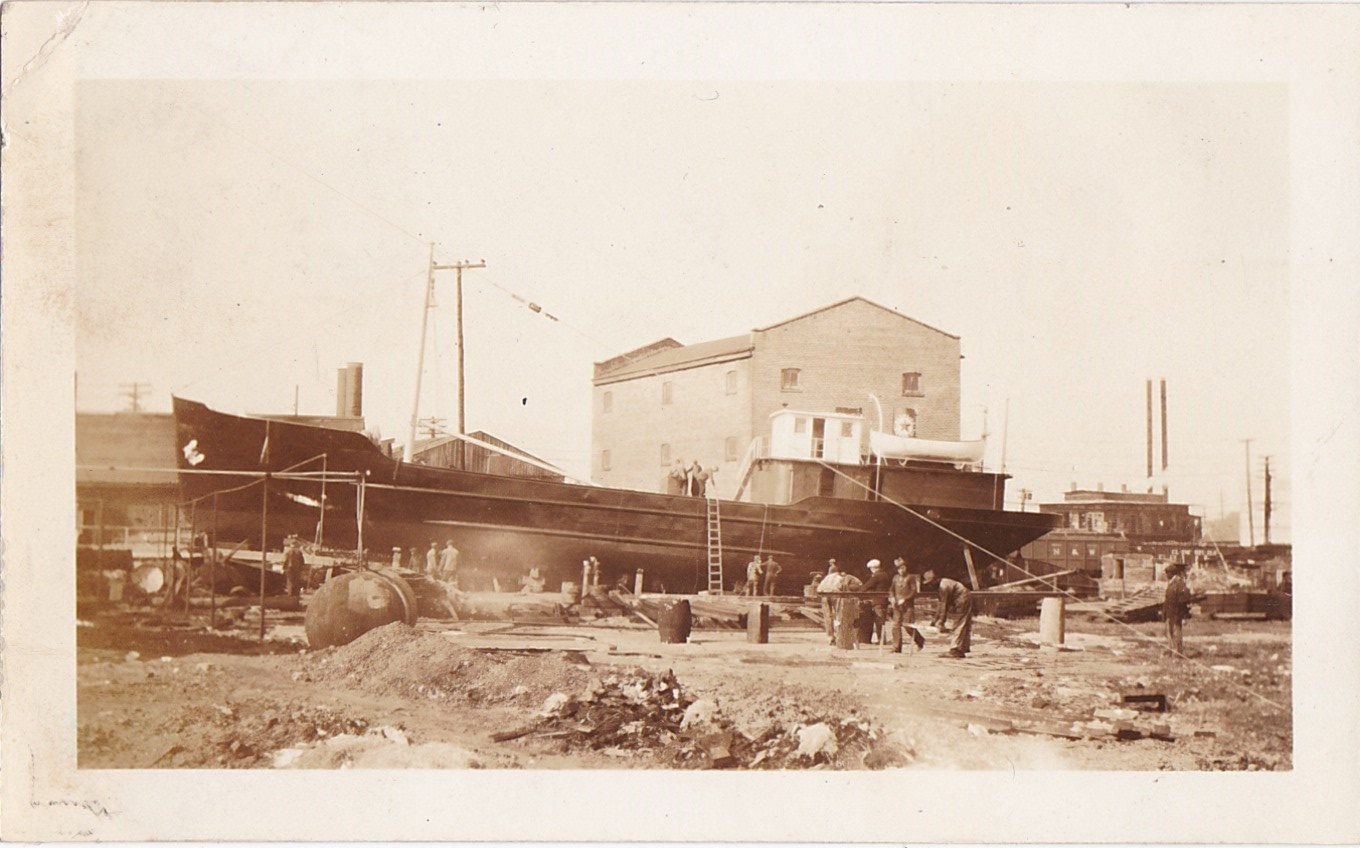
- M/S Carolinian prior to launch, Charleston Dry Dock & Machine Co.

History

United States
- Name: Carolinian
- Namesake: Demonym of "Carolina"
- Owner: M. L. Clark
- Operator: The Texas Company (Texaco)
- Route: Elizabeth City, N.C. and adjacent ports.
- Builder: Charleston Dry Dock & Machine Company
- Laid down: Around July, 1929
- Launched: February 14, 1930
- Completed: March 9, 1930
- Maiden voyage: From Charleston, April, 1930
- Home port: Elizabeth City, North Carolina
- Notes: Designed by R. F. Smith, naval architect.

General characteristics
- Type: Coastal Tanker
- Tonnage: 226 tons
- Displacement: 440 tons (loaded)
- Length: 120 ft.
- Beam: 23 ft.
- Draft: 8.5 ft. (loaded)
- Depth: 10 ft.
- Installed power: (1x) Fairbanks-Morse 6 cyl. marine diesel engine, 10-inch cylinder dia., 12.5-inch stroke. 180 shp at 400 rpm.
- Propulsion: Single Screw
- Speed: 11.5 knots
- Boats & landing craft carried: 1(?)
- Capacity: 125,000 U.S. gallons
- Crew: 4(?)
- Notes: Coastwise Trade, R.F. Smith-patented Lock Notch Welded System

For the first all-welded ship assembled with tack and service bolts, see M/S Fullagar.

The M/S Carolinian was the first entirely-welded motor ship built in the United States, and the world's first welded vessel constructed without perforating the watertight members for assembly. She was completed in March of 1930 in Charleston, South Carolina, United States. Built by Charleston Dry Dock & Machine Company, she was a 226-ton tanker designed for coastal shipping. Miles L. Clark is a known owner, with Texaco as the operator (notice the insignia on her stack prior to launch). The ship took about nine months to complete from the time her keel was laid. As denoted by the prefix M/S, the vessel also had an internal combustion main engine. Welded construction and internal combustion engines are staples in modern shipbuilding, allowing the Carolinian to be one of the first truly modern merchant ships.

Richard F. Smith, the designer, devised the lock notch welded system for which Charleston Dry Dock & Machine was the sole licensee. The design consisted of steel plates with notches that allowed easy fit-up and welding. Only nine workmen were required to assemble the hull. This design saved one-quarter of the cost, and 85,000-lbs of rivets. The welding required a mere 8,000-lbs of welding wire by comparison.

During the shakedown cruise on March 8, she made 11.5 knots heading out to sea, beyond Fort Sumter. The success of the Carolinian's maiden voyage the following month, and two flawless subsequent dry-dock inspections spurred an "estimate" for six orders of similar ships in 1931.

On March 9, 1934, the Carolinian rescued four fishermen from a squall near Elizabeth City, North Carolina, the homeport of this vessel. She was under the command of Captain E. R. Outlaw.

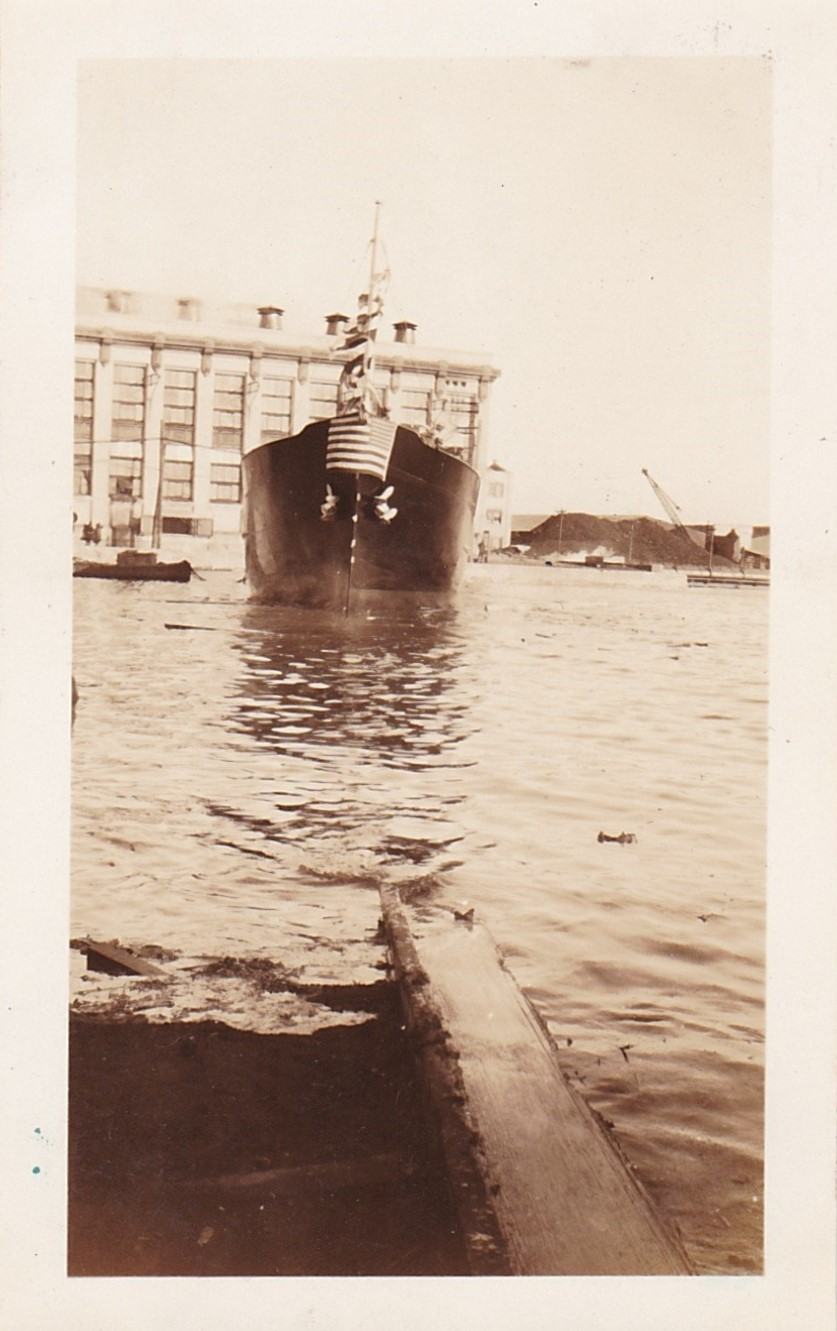
M/S Carolinian going down the slipway.

The vessel was later purchased by Pine State By-Products of South Portland, Maine. It was converted into a barge later in its career, and remained in the Register into the early-1980s.
