= USS Draco =

Cargo ship of the United States Navy

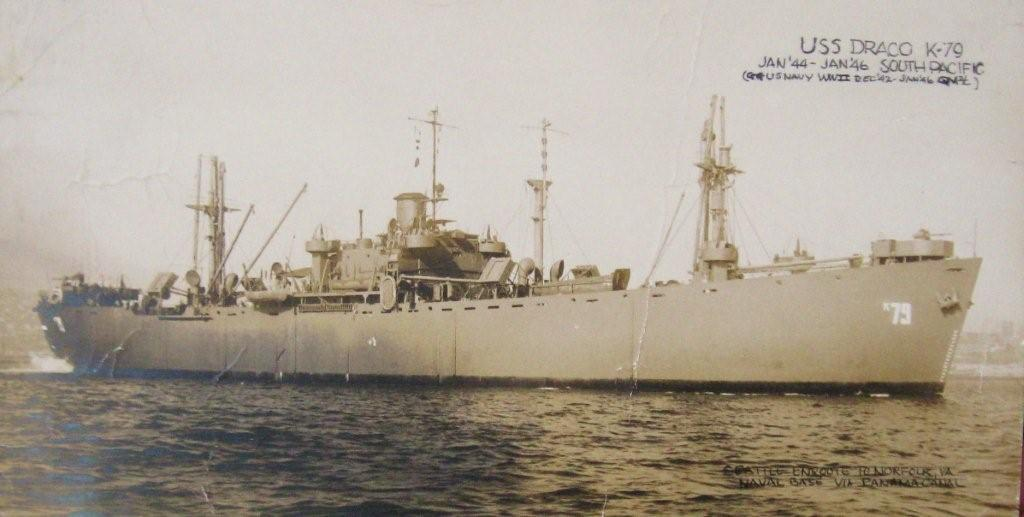
- USS Draco (AK-79), Puget Sound, August 1945

History

United States
- Name: John M. Palmer; Draco
- Namesake: John M. Palmer; The constellation Draco
- Ordered: as a Type EC2-S-C1 hull, MCE hull 453
- Builder: Permanente Metals Corporation, Richmond, California
- Cost: $1,112,024
- Yard number: 453
- Way number: 9
- Laid down: 15 December 1942
- Launched: 19 January 1943
- Sponsored by: Miss Gayle Marie Sanfacon
- Acquired: 31 January 1943
- Commissioned: 16 February 1943
- Decommissioned: 28 November 1945
- Stricken: 19 December 1945
- Identification: Hull symbol: AK-79; Code letters: NYQQ
- Honors and awards: 2 × battle stars
- Fate: Sold for commercial use, 9 August 1947

Union of South Africa
- Name: President Kruger
- Namesake: Paul Kruger
- Owner: Southern Steamship Proprietary, Ltd., Johannesburg
- Acquired: 9 August 1947
- Renamed: sold 1951, renamed Riviera; sold 1953, renamed Effie; renamed 1958, President Pretorius, Marthinus Wessel Pretorius
- Fate: Scrapped April 1968

General characteristics
- Class & type: Crater-class cargo ship
- Displacement: 4,023 long tons (4,088 t) (standard); 14,550 long tons (14,780 t) (full load)
- Length: 441 ft 6 in (134.57 m)
- Beam: 56 ft 11 in (17.35 m)
- Draft: 28 ft 4 in (8.64 m)
- Installed power: 2 × Oil fired 450 °F (232 °C) boilers, operating at 220 psi (1,500 kPa) , (manufactured by Babcock & Wilcox); 2,500 shp (1,900 kW)
- Propulsion: 1 × Vertical triple-expansion reciprocating steam engine, (manufactured by Joshua Hendy); 1 × screw propeller
- Speed: 12.5 kn (23.2 km/h; 14.4 mph)
- Capacity: 7,800 t (7,700 long tons) DWT; 444,206 cu ft (12,578.5 m^{3}) (non-refrigerated)
- Complement: 206
- Armament: 1 × 5 in (127 mm)/38 caliber dual-purpose (DP) gun; 1 × 3 in (76 mm)/50 caliber DP gun; 2 × 40 mm (1.57 in) Bofors anti-aircraft (AA) gun mounts; 6 × 20 mm (0.79 in) Oerlikon cannon AA gun mounts

USS Draco (AK-79) was a Crater-class cargo ship commissioned by the US Navy for service in World War II. Named after the constellation Draco. She was responsible for delivering goods and equipment to locations in the war zone.

== Construction ==
Draco was laid down 15 December 1942, as SS John M. Palmer, MCE hull 453, by Permanente Metals Corporation, Yard No. 2, Richmond, California, under a Maritime Commission (MARCOM) contract; launched 19 January 1943, and sponsored by Miss Gayle Marie Sanfacon. She was transferred to the Navy 31 January 1943; and commissioned 16 February 1943.

== Service history ==
Draco towed YFD-21 from Seattle, Washington, by way of Pearl Harbor to Espiritu Santo, arriving 5 May 1943. She carried cargo from Auckland, New Zealand, to bases on Nouméa, Espiritu Santo, Guadalcanal, and the Fiji Islands, and acted in support of the consolidation of the Solomons, the invasions of Cape Torokina, Bougainville, and Emirau. From 27 July to 10 August 1944 she unloaded cargo at Guam in the capture and occupation of that island, then returned to cargo runs between New Zealand and the Solomons until arriving at Ulithi 26 May 1945.

Draco sailed from Ulithi 20 June 1945, for Okinawa, where she discharged Army supplies from 26 June to 12 July. Sailing by way of Guadalcanal to load salvaged equipment and vehicles, Draco arrived at Tacoma, Washington, 27 August 1945.

== Post-war decommissioning ==
Draco was decommissioned 28 November 1945, and returned to MARCOM for disposal the same day. She entered the National Defense Reserve Fleet, James River Group, Lee Hall, Virginia, 28 November 1945.

== Merchant service ==
On 9 August 1947, she was sold to the South African company, Southern Steamship Proprietary, Ltd., and renamed President Kruger. She was again sold in 1951, and renamed Riviera. In 1953, she was sold and renamed Effie. She was renamed President Pretorius in 1958, and finally sold in April 1968, to be scrapped at Kaohsiung, Taiwan.

== Awards ==
Draco received two battle stars for World War II service.

== Bibliography ==
- "Draco". Dictionary of American Naval Fighting Ships. Naval History and Heritage Command. This article incorporates text from this source, which is in the public domain.
- "Kaiser Permanente No. 2, Richmond CA". www.ShipbuildingHistory.com. 13 October 2010.
- "USS Draco (AK-79)". NavSource. 11 July 2014.
- "JOHN M. PALMER". United States Department of Transportation. Archived from the original on 12 December 2019.
- "SS John M. Palmer".
