= Carl Benner =

American electrical engineer

Carl L. Benner is an electrical engineer at the Texas A&M Engineering Experiment Station in College Station, Texas. He was named a Fellow of the Institute of Electrical and Electronics Engineers (IEEE) in 2014 for his contributions to the development of waveform-based analytics for electric power distribution.
