= Dietrich Benner =

German educationist (born 1941)

Dietrich Benner (born March 1, 1941 in Neuwied, Germany) is a German educationalist. He is Professor Emeritus of General Education at Humboldt University of Berlin. Benner's research focuses on topics in general and systematic pedagogy, the theory of upbringing, education and schooling, general didactics and science didactics, the history of educational theory and reform pedagogy, as well as the modeling and testing of religious and moral competence.

== Biography ==
Benner attended the Görres Gymnasium in Koblenz and studied philosophy, German studies, history, and education at the Universities of Bonn (1961–1962) and Vienna (1962–1965). In 1965, he received his doctorate from the University of Vienna under Erich Heintel with a philosophical study on Hegel and Marx. From 1965 to 1971, he was a research assistant to Josef Derbolav at the Institute of Education at the University of Bonn. There, he earned his habilitation in educational science in 1970. From the summer semester of 1971 to the summer semester of 1972, he held a substitute professorship for Eugen Fink at the University of Freiburg. In 1973, he accepted a professorship in educational science at the University of Münster .

After accepting professorships at the Universities of Klagenfurt (1976) and Zurich (1977), Benner accepted a professorship at Humboldt University of Berlin in 1991, where he has been Professor Emeritus since 2009. From 2008 to 2013, he was Professor of Education at Cardinal Stefan Wyszyński University in Warsaw , where he founded the Department of Theoretical Foundations of Pedagogy. He has also held visiting professorships and seminars at the Universities of Fribourg, Zurich, Basel, Odense, Prague, Vienna, and Hamburg. Since 1999, Benner has regularly taught and conducted research at the East China Pedagogical University (ECNU). His successor at Humboldt University is Malte Brinkmann .

== Works ==
- Hauptströmungen der Erziehungswissenschaft. Eine Systematik traditioneller und moderner Theorien. München 1973, ISBN 3-471-66544-7. (4. Auflage. Weinheim / Basel 2001, ISBN 3-89271-272-7)
- mit Jörg Ramseger: Wenn die Schule sich öffnet. Erfahrungen aus dem Grundschulprojekt Gievenbeck. München 1981, ISBN 3-7799-0650-3.
- Johann Friedrich Herbart: Systematische Pädagogik. Eingeleitet, ausgewählt und interpretiert von D. Benner. Stuttgart 1986.
- Allgemeine Pädagogik. Eine systematisch-problemgeschichtliche Einführung in die Grundstruktur pädagogischen Denkens und Handelns. Weinheim / München 1987, ISBN 3-7799-0340-7. (9. Auflage. Weinheim / Basel 2015, ISBN 978-3-7799-8758-1)
- Wilhelm von Humboldt's Bildungstheorie. Eine problemgeschichtliche Studie zum Begründungszusammenhang neuzeitlicher Bildungsreform. Weinheim / München 1990, ISBN 3-7799-0594-9. (3. Auflage. 2003, ISBN 3-7799-1715-7)
- mit Herwart Kemper: Theorie und Geschichte der Reformpädagogik. 4 Bände. Weinheim 2001. 2. und 3. Auflage, Weinheim / Basel 2009, ISBN 978-3-407-32106-0, ISBN 978-3-407-32107-7, ISBN 978-3-407-32108-4, ISBN 978-3-407-32104-6.
- Bildungstheorie und Bildungsforschung: Grundlagenreflexionen und Anwendungsfelder. Schöningh, Paderborn 2008.
- mit Friedhelm Brüggen: Geschichte der Pädagogik. Vom Beginn der Neuzeit bis zur Gegenwart. Stuttgart 2011, ISBN 978-3-15-010811-6.
- mit R. Schieder, H. Schluß und J. Willems: Religiöse Kompetenz als Teil öffentlicher Bildung. Versuch einer empirisch, bildungstheoretisch und religionspädagogisch ausgewiesenen Konstruktion religiöser Dimensionen und Anspruchsniveaus. Paderborn 2011, ISBN 978-3-506-77077-6.
- Bildung und Religion. Nur einem bildsamen Wesen kann ein Gott sich offenbaren. Paderborn 2014, ISBN 978-3-506-77994-6.
- mit A. von Oettingen, Z. Peng und D. Stępkowski: Bildung – Moral – Demokratie. Theorien und Konzepte moralischer Erziehung und Bildung und ihre Beziehungen zu Ethik und Politik. Paderborn 2015, ISBN 978-3-506-76946-6.
- mit R. Nikolova: Ethisch-moralische Kompetenz als Teil öffentlicher Bildung. Der Berliner Ansatz zur Konstruktion und Erhebung ethisch-moralischer Kompetenzniveaus im öffentlichen Erziehungs- und Bildungssystem mit einem Ausblick auf Projekte zu ETiK-International. Paderborn 2016, ISBN 978-3-506-78596-1.
- Umriss der allgemeinen Wissenschaftsdidaktik. Grundlagen und Orientierungen für Lehrerbildung, Unterricht und Forschung. Weinheim 2020, ISBN 978-3-7799-6021-8. (2. Auflage 2022, ISBN 978-3-7799-6861-0)
- Die Verteidigung der Eigenlogik der Erziehung. Aufsätze von Dietrich Benner in China. Hrsg. von Peng Zhengmei & Peng Tao. Beijing 2023, ISBN 978-7-5191-3624-6).
- Studien zur Eigenlogik moderner Erziehung und ihre Vernachlässigung in Bildungsforschung und Bildungspolitik. Weinheim 2024, ISBN 978-3-7799-8296-8 Print.

=== Essays ===
- Erziehung und Emanzipation. In: Pädagogische Rundschau. Band 24, 1970, S. 503–518.
- Pädagogisches Experiment zwischen Technologie und Praxeologie. In: Pädagogische Rundschau. Band 26, 1972, S. 25–53.
- Über die Aufgaben der Pädagogik nach dem Ende der DDR. Antrittsvorlesung am Fachbereich Erziehungswissenschaften der Humboldt-Universität zu Berlin. In: Zeitschrift für Pädagogik. Band 39, 1993, S. 891–906.
- Die Struktur der Allgemeinbildung im Kerncurriculum moderner Bildungssysteme. Ein Vorschlag zur bildungstheoretischen Rahmung von PISA. In: Zeitschrift für Pädagogik. Band 48, 2002, S. 68–90.
- Erziehung und Tradierung. Grundprobleme einer innovatorischen Theorie und Praxis der Überlieferung. In: Vierteljahrsschrift für wissenschaftliche Pädagogik. Band 80, 2004, S. 163–181.
- Schulische Allgemeinbildung versus allgemeine Menschenbildung? Von der doppelten Gefahr einer wechselseitigen Beschädigung beider. In: Zeitschrift für Erziehungswissenschaft. Band 8, 2005, S. 563–575.
- Wissensformen der Wissensgesellschaft. In: Metamorphosen der Bildung. Historie – Empirie – Theorie. Festschrift für Heinz Elmar Tenorth. Bad Heilbrunn 2011, 29–50.
- Erziehung und Bildung! Zur Konzeptualisierung eines erziehenden Unterrichts, der bildet. In: Zeitschrift für Pädagogik. Band 61, 2015, S. 481–496.
- Über drei Arten von Kausalität in Erziehungs- und Bildungsprozessen und ihre Bedeutung für Didaktik, Unterrichtsforschung und empirische Bildungsforschung. In: Zeitschrift für Pädagogik. Band 64, 2018, S. 107–120.
- Gerechtigkeit in pädagogischen Kontexten. In: Bildungsgerechtigkeit als Versprechen. Zur Rechtfertigung und Infragestellung eines mehrdeutigen Konzepts. Münster 2019, S. 21–38.
- mit Zhengmei Peng, Roumiana Nikolova, Stanislav Ivanov und Tao Peng: Ethical and Moral Competences of Upper Secondary Students: A Comparative Study. In: ECNU Review of Education. Vol. 4, Nr. 4, 2021, S. 686–706.
- Grundlegende pädagogische Unterscheidungen und ihre Bedeutung für erziehungswissenschaftliche Theorieentwicklung und Forschung. In: Bildung und Erziehung. Band 75, Heft 1, 2022, S. 7–23.
- Allgemeinheit und Sozialität als operative Bereiche und moderne Aufgaben der Erziehung. In: D. Paulus. P. Gollub (Hrsg.): Reisen durch die Pädagogik und Bildung. Transepochale Forschung in der Erziehungswissenschaft. Berlin 2022, S. 35–55.
- mit Robert Wunsch: Zehn Thesen zu Ursprung und Pragmatik modernen Pädagogik und Sozialpädagogik. In: neue praxis. Zeitschrift für Sozialarbeit, Sozialpädagogik und Sozialpolitik. Heft 4, 2022, S. 345–356.
- mit Sandra Piper: Perspektiven zur Reform vorschulischer Erziehung und Bildung. Anregungen zur Reform der frühpädagogischen Ausbildung und Praxis in Berlin. .
- Affirmativity and Non-affirmativity in the Concept of Theories of Education and Bildung. In: M. Uljens (Hrsg.): Non-affirmative Theory of Education and Bildung. Open Access: Springer, 2023, S. 21–59.
- Miteinander-Streiten. Eine unverzichtbare Praktik der Erziehung?. In: Pädagogische Korrespondenz. Heft 68, 2023, S. 72–90.
- Über die Gleichrangigkeit von Allgemeiner und Sozialer Pädagogik. In: R. Wunsch, D. Benner (Hrsg.): Soziale Arbeit und Sozialpädagogik weiterentwickeln. Weinheim 2025, ISBN 978-3-7799-8856-4, 184–214.
- Literature by and about Dietrich Benner in the German National Library catalogue
- Projekte von Dietrich Benner https://amor.cms.hu-berlin.de/~h0709ccv//dfg.pdf

=== Video-Podcast ===
- Dietrich Benner – Über drei Kausalitäten in Erziehungs- und Bildungsprozessen. (Vortag in der Abteilung Allgemeine Erziehungswissenschaft an der Humboldt-Universität vom 10. Januar 2018) (https://www.youtube.com/watch?v=Z2GuMvK7DU4)
- Dietrich Benner – Vorlesungen über allgemeine Wissenschaftsdidaktik an der Universität Hamburg im WS 2018/19 (https://lecture2go.uni-hamburg.de/l2go/-/get/v/23553)
- Dietrich Benner im Gespräch mit Nina Kühn über Herbart und die Eigenlogik moderner Erziehung. (Podcast von 120 Minuten an der Pädagogischen Hochschule Karlsruhe vom 29. April 2024) (https://open.spotify.com/episode/60GbqSyVAmt7EQbUWDUYZU?nd=1)

== Honors ==
- 2004: Honorary Professor at East China Normal University (ECNU) Shanghai
- 2009: Honorary doctorate from Aarhus University in Denmark
- 2011: Honorary doctorate from Åbo Akademi University, Finland
- 2012: Honorary membership of the German Society for Educational Science
- 2020: Honorary doctorate from the University of Hamburg
- 2023: Honorary Medal of the Polish Society for Philosophical Pedagogy
- 2024: Ernst-Christian-Trapp Prize of the German Society for Educational Science
