= USS Benner (DE-551) =

History

United States
- Name: USS Benner
- Namesake: Second Lieutenant Stanley G. Benner (1916-1942), a U.S. Marine Corps officer and Silver Star recipient
- Builder: Boston Navy Yard, Boston, Massachusetts (proposed)
- Laid down: Never
- Fate: Construction contract cancelled 10 June 1944

General characteristics
- Class & type: John C. Butler-class destroyer escort
- Displacement: 1,350 tons
- Length: 306 ft (93 m)
- Beam: 36 ft 8 in (11 m)
- Draft: 9 ft 5 in (3 m)
- Propulsion: 2 boilers, 2 geared turbine engines, 12,000 shp; 2 propellers
- Speed: 24 knots (44 km/h)
- Range: 6,000 nmi. (12,000 km) @ 12 kt
- Complement: 14 officers, 201 enlisted
- Armament: 2 × single 5 in (127 mm) guns; 2 × twin 40 mm (1.6 in) AA guns; 10 × single 20 mm (0.79 in) AA guns; 1 × triple 21 in (533 mm) torpedo tubes; 8 × depth charge throwers; 1 × Hedgehog ASW mortar; 2 × depth charge racks

USS Benner (DE-551) was a proposed World War II United States Navy John C. Butler-class destroyer escort that was never built.

Benner was to have been built at the Boston Navy Yard in Boston, Massachusetts, but her construction contract was cancelled on 10 June 1944 before construction could begin.

The name Benner was reassigned to the destroyer USS Benner (DD-807).
