= Charleston Dry Dock & Machine Company =

Shipyard in South Carolina

Coordinates: 32.788711°N 79.924533°W

Charleston Dry Dock & Machine Company (renamed Charleston Drydock and Shipbuilding Co. in the late-1930s) was a shipyard located in Charleston, South Carolina, on the Cooper River. The shipyard is significant for its contribution to marine engineering, including the first entirely-welded commercial ship built in the United States. It was owned and operated by Leland Louis Green who was the first registered naval architect in South Carolina.

== Description ==
The site is situated east of Concord Street, between the intersections of Calhoun and Laurens Streets. In the late-19th century, the wharves along Concord Street were home to naval store warehouses and Pregnall Brothers Shipyard, which was established in 1869. Pregnall Brothers closed in 1912, reopening that same year as Valk & Murdoch Iron Works. In 1919, the yard was renamed Charleston Dry Dock & Machine Co.

In 1921, it was reported that the plant had an 8,500-ton floating drydock, with a 30-foot depth of water coming into the facility. The drydock was designed by Crandall Dry Dock Engineers of Massachusetts.

The first entirely-welded ship in the world, the MS Carolinian, was built at the facility in 1929-1930. It was designed by R.F. Smith, and Charleston Dry Dock & Machine was the sole licensee of this design.

== World War II ==
Charleston Shipbuilding & Dry Dock was responsible for building at least 36 tugboats for the U.S. Navy from 1942-1946. Some of these vessels still have active registrations as of 2015.

== Philip Simmons ==
Philip Simmons worked in, and also operated, a blacksmith shop at various locations adjacent to Charleston Dry Dock & Machine Company. Some of his early work included repairing tools and equipment for waterfront industries.

== Fate and legacy ==
In the Fall of 1946, Charleston Shipbuilding & Drydock Co. began operations under Todd Shipyards of New York. In 2000, construction was completed on part of the site for the South Carolina Aquarium. Severe contamination of the site hindered the project in the late-1990s, and eventually lead to costly delays. Since the 1980s, the former shipyard facility is also occupied by several condominium communities as well as the Charleston Maritime Center (early-2000s).

Two U.S. Coast Guard lightships built by Charleston Dry Dock & Machine Co., Frying Pan (LV-115) and Chesapeake (LV-116), survive as museum ships as of 2017.
