= USS Benner (DD-807) =

Gearing-class destroyer

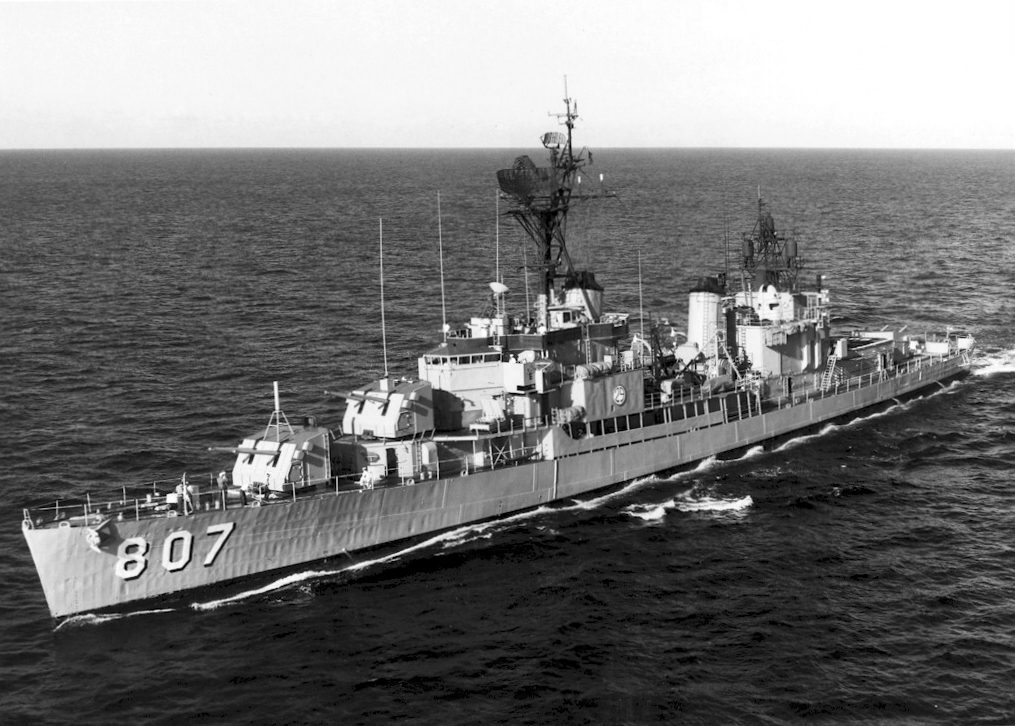
- USS Benner (DD-807) off Hawaii, in 1968

History

United States
- Name: USS Benner
- Namesake: Second Lieutenant Stanley G. Benner (1916–1942), a United States Marine Corps Silver Star recipient
- Builder: Bath Iron Works, Bath, Maine
- Laid down: 10 July 1944
- Launched: 30 November 1944
- Commissioned: 13 February 1945
- Modernized: February 1963 (FRAM II)
- Decommissioned: 20 November 1970
- Reclassified: DDR-807, 18 March 1949; DD-807, 15 November 1962
- Stricken: 1 February 1974
- Identification: Callsign: NTWE; Hull number: DD-807
- Honors and awards: 1 battle star (World War II); 5 battle stars (Vietnam)
- Fate: Sold for scrap, 18 April 1975

General characteristics
- Class & type: Gearing-class destroyer
- Displacement: 3,460 long tons (3,516 t) full
- Length: 390 ft 6 in (119.02 m)
- Beam: 40 ft 10 in (12.45 m)
- Draft: 14 ft 4 in (4.37 m)
- Propulsion: Geared turbines, 2 shafts, 60,000 shp (45 MW)
- Speed: 35 knots (65 km/h; 40 mph)
- Range: 4,500 nmi (8,300 km) at 20 kn (37 km/h; 23 mph)
- Complement: 336
- Armament: 6 × 5"/38 caliber guns; 12 × 40 mm AA guns; 11 × 20 mm AA guns; 10 × 21 inch (533 mm) torpedo tubes; 6 × depth charge projectors; 2 × depth charge tracks

USS Benner (DD/DDR-807) was a Gearing-class destroyer of the United States Navy, named for Marine Second Lieutenant Stanley G. Benner (1916–1942), who was killed during the Battle of Guadalcanal.

== Namesake ==
Stanley Graves Benner was born on 5 July 1916 in Arlington, Massachusetts. He lived in Boston, Massachusetts, until 1940. Enlisting in the United States Marine Corps Reserve on 21 August 1940, he reported for active duty at Marine Corps Base Quantico, on 8 November that same year. After training at the Marine Corps' recruit depot at Marine Corps Recruit Depot Parris Island, he arrived at Guantanamo Bay Naval Base, on 21 January 1941. While there, he participated in maneuvers on the Puerto Rican Island of Culebra. Transferred to the Marine Corps Base at Parris Island, S.C., on 12 April, he served there—receiving a promotion to private first class on 26 May, until shifting duty station to what would later become Camp Lejeune at New River, N.C., on 28 September. Benner was promoted to corporal on 11 October 1941 and to Sergeant on 1 April 1942.

Ordered to the field on 8 May 1942, Benner joined Company "A", 1st Battalion, 7th Marines, and, after traveling by rail to Marine Corps Recruit Depot San Diego, sailed for the South Pacific in late May. After arriving at Tutuila, the battalion reinforced other elements of the 7th Marines already on garrison duty in the Samoan Islands. It remained there, serving as a reserve amphibious force, during the initial landings on Guadalcanal in early August. While on Samoa, Sgt. Benner accepted appointment as second lieutenant on 4 August. The 7th Marines sailed from Samoa on 4 September, for Espiritu Santo in the New Hebrides. Upon arrival on the 12th, the regiment received orders to move to Guadalcanal as soon as possible. Departing the New Hebrides on the 14th, the transports arrived off Kukum, Guadalcanal, on 18 September. Later that same day, the 7th Marines took up a position astride "Bloody Ridge", guarding the perimeter's southern flank from there down to the Lunga River.

Over the next few weeks, Benner's unit took part in the fierce fighting along the Matanikau River, including the desperate amphibious evacuation west of Point Cruz on 27 September and the far more successful spoiling attack west of the river between 7 and 9 October. The 1st Battalion then returned to their original positions on "Bloody Ridge." On the night of 24 October the Japanese 4th Infantry Regiment closed the perimeter's southern flank. When the Japanese arrived, only Benner's 1st Battalion remained to face them because the 2d Battalion had been pulled out to reinforce the perimeter's western flank the day before.

The assault, coming under cover of heavy rain and darkness, surged out of the jungle just after midnight on the 25th. The Japanese, throwing grenades and firing rifles and machine guns, repeatedly charged the marine positions but were beaten back by American small arms, mortar, and artillery fire. The enemy kept the pressure on the ridge throughout the night, at one point forcing a salient into the Marines' line, but were eventually driven back with heavy losses. The Japanese resumed the attack the following evening, throwing fresh troops into the fray. Artillery, mortars, small arms, and canister-firing 37-millimeter guns cut down the repeated Japanese assaults, forcing the decimated units to withdraw. Benner led his platoon in the fierce two days of combat on "Bloody Ridge" and directed its fire against repeated assaults of enemy forces greatly superior in number. In so doing, contributing to the "rout and virtual annihilation of a Japanese regiment" he was killed in action in the early morning hours of 26 October. Benner was awarded the Silver Star, posthumously.

The destroyer escort USS Benner was named for Benner, but her construction was cancelled in 1944 before it could begin.

== Construction and commissioning ==
Benner was laid down on 10 July 1944 at Bath, Maine, by the Bath Iron Works Corp.; launched on 30 November 1944; sponsored by Mrs. Gertrude A. Benner, 2ndLt Benner's mother; and commissioned at Boston, Massachusetts, on 13 February 1945.

== 1945 ==
Intended for service as a "picket ship" in the Pacific, Benner received radar and other modifications at the Boston Navy Yard between 13 February and 21 March. She then sailed for Guantanamo Bay, Cuba, on the 28th, arriving there on the 31st. The destroyer conducted four weeks of shakedown exercises, including gunnery, antiaircraft, and anti-submarine warfare (ASW) drills.

On 29 April, she steamed to Gonaïves Bay, Haiti, for ASW training on a friendly "bottomed out" submarine and conducted a shore bombardment exercise off Culebra Island the following day. After her rendezvous with HMS Reaper (D82) in Windward Passage on 3 May, the warships sailed north on an antisubmarine patrol. Although Benner's crew dropped 11 depth charges on a possible submarine contact later that day, they later determined it to be a false contact. She parted company with HMS Reaper on the 7th and sailed independently for Boston, arriving on 8 May for three weeks of post-shakedown availability. Following those repairs, the destroyer steamed to Norfolk, Virginia, where she joined Prince William (CVE-31) and Gantner (APD-42) in preparation for sailing to the Pacific.

Benner got underway for the Panama Canal on 2 June, transited the canal on the 8th, and arrived at San Diego, California on 15 June. After minor repairs, she sailed for Hawaii on the 18th, mooring in Pearl Harbor on 23 June. Benner spent the rest of the month conducting training missions – antiaircraft, fighter-direction, radar jamming, and motor-torpedo-boat (MTB) evasion exercises – in preparation for deployment to the waters off Japan.

In company with Terry (DD-513), escorting Wasp (CV-18) in Task Unit 12.5.3 (TU 12.5.3), Benner departed Pearl Harbor on 12 July. During the transit across the central Pacific, the destroyers screened Wasp as that aircraft carrier launched air strikes against Wake Island on the 18th. After a brief pause at Eniwetok to refuel the following day, the task unit joined Task Force 38 (TF 38) just south of the Japanese home islands on 26 July.

Benner screened Randolph (CV-15) in Task Group 38.3 (TG 38.3) during 28 July air strikes against enemy shipping at Maizuru and on 30 July against the Tokyo-Nagoya area. While a typhoon canceled further attacks scheduled for early August, the task group refueled and then moved into position for strikes against northern Honshū on 8 August. Taking up a picket position – about 50 miles (90 km) southwest of TF 38 – with John W. Weeks (DD-701), Borie (DD-704) and Hank (DD-702), Benner watched as unidentified aircraft approached their position all day. Although most of the enemy aircraft retreated before friendly combat air patrol (CAP), some low-flying Japanese aircraft sneaked under the CAP's protective umbrella to attack the destroyers.

At 14:54, a single Aichi B7A1 "Grace" carrier attack plane dove over Hank, passed across the formation, and, despite withering anti-aircraft fire, banked around to crash into Borie. Large fires broke out immediately, especially in her forward superstructure around the bridge; and the three other destroyers spent the next two hours fending off four more enemy attacks. After Borie's damage control teams got the fires under control, Benner spent a fruitless evening searching the water for Borie crewmen lost over the side.

The destroyers continued screen operations between 10 and 15 August before TF 38 retired southeast of Honshū to await developments in the wake of news of the Japanese surrender. Detached on 24 August, Benner cruised off Nagoya to provide an aircraft homing beacon for flights to Tokyo from Okinawa. On 4 September, she joined a task group formed around Bennington (CV-20) and cruised off Honshū as that carrier launched POW-relief flights through 9 September. Following leave and upkeep in Tokyo, the destroyer steamed to the Marshall Islands at the end of September – for a week's upkeep alongside a tender – before returning to Japan for three more months of occupation duty.

== 1946–1948 ==
Departing Tokyo on 3 January 1946, Benner spent the next three months cruising in the western Pacific, visiting Guam, Saipan, and several Philippine Islands before finally sailing for home on 25 March. She arrived at San Diego, by way of Eniwetok and Pearl Harbor, on 11 April. After several months of limited operations out of San Diego, the destroyer received an overhaul at Terminal Island between 29 August and 23 November before returning to San Diego in preparation for an overseas deployment.

On 6 January 1947, Benner departed San Diego in company with Dennis J. Buckley (DD-808) and arrived at Hong Kong, via Pearl Harbor and Eniwetok, on the 30th. Tensions in the region were high, and Benner spent eight months cruising the East China Sea in support of the ultimately futile American efforts to resolve the Chinese Civil War. She visited the Chinese ports of Shanghai, Qingdao, and Qinhuangdao, as well as the Korean port of Pusan, before sailing for San Diego, where she arrived on 8 October.

Following 11 months of local operations in California waters, the destroyer departed San Diego for China on 1 October 1948 – mainly to escort the Pacific Mobile Striking Force to Qingdao and to help monitor the withdrawal of Soviet forces from North Korea – before returning home on 23 December.

== 1949–1956 ==
She remained in California waters, conducting routine operations, into the spring of 1949. During this period, the warship was reclassified as a radar picket destroyer and was redesignated DDR-807 on 18 March 1949. Reassigned to the Atlantic Fleet on 1 May, Benner got underway the following day, transited the Panama Canal on 12 May and arrived at her new home port of Newport, R.I., on the 23rd. The destroyer operated out of there on normal peacetime duty with Destroyer Division 102 (DesDiv 102), conducting routine exercises in Narragansett Bay and making three reserve training cruises over the summer, visiting New London; Poughkeepsie; New York City; Washington, D.C.; and Charlottetown, Prince Edward Island, Canada. In October and November, Benner participated in a bilateral amphibious landing exercise with units of the Canadian Navy on the coast of Labrador.

After another overhaul at Norfolk and a fourth reserve training cruise – this one to the West Indies between 24 February and 14 April 1950 – Benner embarked on her first Mediterranean deployment on 2 May. The destroyer visited Lisbon, Portugal; the island of Elba; and Naples, Italy; before steaming to La Spezia on 21 June. Following the North Korean invasion of South Korea on the 25th, Benner put to sea in case hostilities broke out in Europe. She operated in the eastern Mediterranean for the next three months – visiting such ports as Istanbul, Turkey; Beirut, Lebanon; and Argostoli, Greece – before coming home to Newport on 10 October.

Over the next five years, the destroyer made three more of these Mediterranean cruises (20 March to 4 October 1951, 2 October 1952 to 4 February 1953, and 4 May to 28 September 1954). In the course of these missions, she visited ports in Spain, France, Italy, Greece, and Turkey. During the latter deployment, she also visited Algiers and Tangier in North Africa. Following each of these overseas tours, the destroyer made short reserve and midshipmen training cruises to the West Indies – mainly visiting Guantanamo Bay, Cuba; Culebra Island, Puerto Rico; and Kingston, Bermuda. The warship also conducted several NATO training exercises during this period. On 26 August 1952, she voyaged above the Arctic Circle east of Greenland to take part in Operations "Mainbrace" and "Longstep" before sailing to the Mediterranean in October of that year.

Following an overhaul at Philadelphia in early 1955, Benner participated in 14 to 27 March Operation "LantFlex 1" – an amphibious exercise off Newfoundland – and then made another summer midshipmen cruise, visiting Málaga, Spain; Plymouth, England; and Guantanamo Bay, Cuba; before returning to Newport on 4 August. In October and November, the destroyer sailed south to the Gulf of Mexico, conducting air defense exercises with land-based aircraft and making port visits to Corpus Christi, Texas, and Port Everglades, Florida. After the holiday leave period, Benner proceeded to the New York Naval Shipyard in Brooklyn for a modernization overhaul. This yard work, which included repairs to hull and frame damage she suffered during a late December hurricane, took place between 6 January and 21 May 1956.

== 1956–1959 ==
Reassigned to the Pacific Fleet in the spring of 1956, Benner departed Newport on 9 June and sailed south, transiting the Panama Canal on 18 June and mooring at her new home port at Long Beach, California, on the 28th. Assigned to DesDiv 91 on 26 August, the destroyer spent the next six months conducting refresher and type training in and around the San Diego operating area.

On 12 March 1957, the warship departed Long Beach on a regular deployment to the western Pacific for operations with the 7th Fleet. The destroyer crossed the Pacific via the southern route, stopping at Suva in the Fiji Islands between 25 and 27 March and at Melbourne, Australia, from 2 to 7 April. Proceeding northward, she refueled at Manus and Guam before arriving at Yokosuka, Japan, on 24 April. As one of the major functions of the 7th Fleet was to patrol the Taiwan Strait – part of the American commitment to secure Taiwan against communist attack – Benner spent most of this deployment screening carrier operations in this part of the region. While there, she visited Kaohsiung, Keelung, and Hong Kong as well as occasionally steaming north for upkeep at Yokosuka, Japan. The destroyer sailed for home on 27 August and arrived at Long Beach on 10 September.

Following a short leave period, Benner conducted local operations in the Long Beach area, maneuvers that were punctuated by tender availability and upkeep periods. Between 21 November 1957 and 10 March 1958, she underwent a routine overhaul at the Long Beach Naval Shipyard. This was followed by six weeks of refresher training in preparation for another Far East deployment.

Underway on 29 April, Benner first proceeded to Eniwetok Atoll in the Marshall Islands. There, she participated in "Operation Hardtack I" – a 35-detonation series of atmospheric nuclear tests designed to evaluate new types of weapons, the effects of high-altitude explosions, and the new Polaris missile warhead prototype. Benner's assignments during these tests included weather observations, search and rescue, and scientific equipment recovery. She also performed air operations center functions at Bikini Atoll. The destroyer then departed Eniwetok on 1 August and arrived in Yokosuka five days later.

After several weeks of screening carrier operations off Okinawa, Benner received orders to proceed south to Taiwan on 25 August. Two days previously, Chinese Communist artillery on the mainland had opened fire on Chinese Nationalist forces on the islands of Quemoy and Matsu. Benner joined what eventually became a six-carrier task force in the region and, over the next eight weeks, helped to protect supply convoys to the beleaguered Nationalist garrison on Quemoy until the crisis eased. After brief stops at Yokosuka and Midway, the destroyer returned to Long Beach on 21 November.

The warship spent the next seven months in the Long Beach area, either conducting local operations or in a tender availability and upkeep status. In June 1959 "Benner" visited Portland, Oregon as part of the Portland Rose Festival fleet. Benner commenced her third western Pacific tour on 17 July 1959, visiting Hong Kong, Kaohsiung, and Yokosuka in between tours on the Taiwan Strait patrol. She returned home to Long Beach for upkeep on 26 November.

== 1960–1970 ==
The destroyer continued this pattern of operations – routine exercises off the California coast in preparation for a deployment to the Orient which was then followed by an upkeep or overhaul period at Long Beach – for the next four and a half years. This pattern was broken in June 1962, when Benner entered the Long Beach Naval Shipyard for an eight-month Fleet Rehabilitation and Modernization (FRAM) overhaul. During this yard period, the destroyer received new sonar and anti-submarine warfare (ASW) weapons, including a Drone Anti-Submarine Helicopter. In addition, she was reclassified from a radar picket destroyer to a destroyer and was redesignated DD-807 on 15 November 1962. She returned to normal operations in May 1963 and, after a series of ASW exercises intended to test her DASH equipment, deployed to the western Pacific again on 20 February 1964. During this cruise, Benner participated in a Southeast Asia Treaty Organization (SEATO) exercise in the Philippines in May and a Taiwan Strait patrol in June before returning home to Long Beach on 12 August for an extended period of leave, upkeep, and local operations.

In April 1965, Benner and DesDiv 232 joined Hornet (CVS-12) for seven weeks of refresher training in San Diego waters. Early in June, she embarked 35 midshipmen for a two-week training cruise in the Puget Sound area. In July, during a five-day shoot on the San Clemente Island range, Benner qualified for both day and night shore bombardment.

On 12 August, the destroyer got underway for a six-month tour of duty in the Far East. After a two-week stop in Hawaii for an ASW readiness evaluation, the warship continued on to Japan, mooring at Yokosuka on 23 September. On 12 October, Benner joined TF 77 for patrol and surveillance duties off the coast of Vietnam. Over the next three days, the destroyer carried out naval gunfire support missions off Quang Ngai before conducting a search and rescue (SAR) patrol in the Gulf of Tonkin. Following a week of recreation in Hong Kong, the warship set out for Taiwan on 10 November, and then operated out of Kaohsiung on the Taiwan Strait patrol. On 5 December, she proceeded north for a joint ASW operation with ships of the Republic of Korea (ROK) Navy and a visit to Chinhae, before steaming to Sasebo for the Christmas holidays. On 3 January 1966, the warship sailed south to Taiwan to conduct four weeks of patrols in the Taiwan Strait. Returning north to Yokosuka on 9 February, she got underway for home on the 18th, and moored at Long Beach on 3 March.

After six weeks of leave and upkeep, Benner underwent a regular three-month overhaul at the San Francisco Bay Naval Shipyard. Returning to Long Beach on 19 July, she spent the next three months preparing for her next Far Eastern cruise. After leaving Long Beach on 4 November, Benner participated in a joint American and Canadian ASW operation in Hawaiian waters where she was awarded the "Golden Plunger Award" for "sinking" Plunger (SSN-595) during the exercise. Continuing on to Yokosuka late that month, the destroyer proceeded to the Gulf of Tonkin and, on 24 December, joined "Operation Sea Dragon", a logistics interdiction effort in the coastal waters of North Vietnam. Benner first action of the tour came when she fired upon three small logistic craft on 6 January 1967, damaging one before they escaped into coastal inlets. The next afternoon, the warship destroyed an enemy anti-aircraft battery. After a short period drydocked in AFDM-5 at Subic Bay, the destroyer sailed to Hong Kong for rest and recreation on the 31st. She returned to routine "Sea Dragon" operations on 8 February.

The tempo of operations increased on 26 February when Benner joined up with Canberra (CAG-2) and Joseph Strauss (DDG-16) for a bombardment of the North Vietnamese coast. During that day, the warship fired seven missions – including two counter-battery actions – and received 116 enemy rounds close aboard. Although the destroyer was straddled twice by fire from Hon Matt Island, her counter-battery fire managed to silence the enemy guns. Over the next week, the destroyer conducted another 36 fire missions – firing off 1,281 5-inch rounds in the process – against enemy targets. After a two-week tender availability at Sasebo, Japan, Benner served a short stint in the Taiwan Strait before returning to Long Beach on 12 May. She spent the remainder of the year in leave, upkeep, and local operations.

Benner began 1968 with ASW refresher training out of San Diego and then deployed once more to Far Eastern waters. Arriving at Yokosuka on 29 May, she headed south to Vietnamese waters and duty as a naval gunfire support ship. Her first opportunity for action came on 26 June when she fired almost 900 5-inch rounds at Viet Cong troops in the Vũng Tàu area in support of "Operation Game Warden". Over the next three weeks, the destroyer also fired in the Demilitarized Zone (DMZ) and in I Corps territory.

Steaming south for rest and recreation, Benner crossed the equator – and observed the traditional "shellback" initiation rites – to visit Port Swettenham in Malaysia between 26 and 29 July. Rejoining TF 77 on 1 August, she participated in ASW Exercise "Swift Move" before steaming to Sasebo on the 7th. Following two weeks of repairs alongside Ajax (AR-6), Benner returned south for carrier screen duties in the Gulf of Tonkin. She finally returned home to Long Beach, via Yokosuka, on 9 November.

In a change of pace, Benner got underway on 3 January 1969 to provide three days of target services to submarines Bugara (SS-331), Charr (AGSS-328), Medregal (AGSS-480) and Bluegill (AGSS-242). Following these exercises, she conducted local operations out of San Diego until moving into the Long Beach Naval Shipyard for an overhaul on 29 January. The destroyer received upgrades to her sonar system during this repair period. Returning to duty on 4 June, the crew then took Benner through a 10-week refresher training cycle.

On 30 July, a fuel oil fire broke out in the destroyer's after fireroom. Although the space was temporarily abandoned owing to the flames, the fire was brought under control and extinguished shortly thereafter. Under closer inspection, the damage proved light and new electrical cables and fixtures were installed at San Diego by 3 August. Returning to local operations the next day, Benner suffered another accident when she lost a remote-controlled DASH helicopter at sea.

Following a series of inspections and a tender availability, Benner departed Long Beach on 8 October for another Far Eastern deployment. After brief stops at Pearl Harbor, Midway, and Yokosuka, she arrived on "Yankee Station" on 13 November. With the prohibition against attacks on targets in North Vietnam in effect since 1 November, the destroyer's duties were limited to plane guard and ASW screen operations to protect TF 77's carriers as they attacked targets in Laos, South Vietnam, and Cambodia. Aside from brief diversions to cover Long Beach (CGN-9) – the primary sea-air rescue ship in the Tonkin Gulf – Benner spent the majority of this cruise screening Ranger (CVA-61) on "Yankee Station".

After Benner returned home on 9 April, she fell victim to the drastic defense infrastructure budget cuts of the time to fund the war in Vietnam. Reporting to the Puget Sound Naval Shipyard in Bremerton on 29 August, the warship began inactivation preparations on 1 September. Benner was decommissioned on 20 November 1970, and her name was struck from the Naval Vessel Register on 1 February 1974. Although authorized for sale to South Korea on 7 February 1974, the offer was refused on 14 March; and she was sold for scrapping to General Metals of Tacoma, Inc., Tacoma, Washington, on 18 April 1975.

== Awards ==
Benner received one battle star for her World War II service and five battle stars for service in the Vietnam War.
