= Edward A. Terry =

Commander Edward Terry
- Born: January 24, 1839; Hartford, Connecticut
- Died: June 2, 1882 (aged 43); Manitou Springs, Colorado
- Military career
- Allegiance: United States of America
- Branch: United States Navy
- Service years: 1853–1881
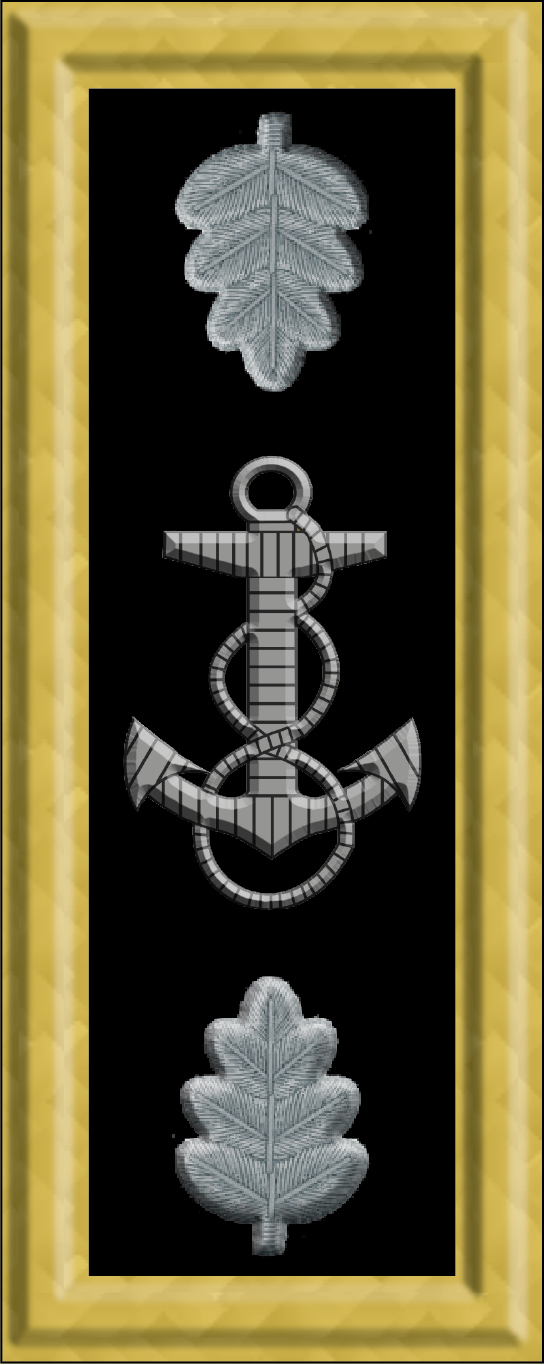
- Rank: Commander
- Commands: USS Saco
- Conflicts: American Civil War

Edward A. Terry (January 24, 1839 – June 1, 1882) was an officer in the United States Navy during the American Civil War. Following the war, he served several tours of duty at the United States Naval Academy, including a tour in the 1870s as Commandant of Cadets.

== Early life and career ==
Born on January 24, 1839, at Hartford, Connecticut, Terry entered the United States Naval Academy on September 21, 1853, and graduated on June 10, 1857. He served as a midshipman in the sloop Germantown, attached to the East India Squadron, from 1857 to 1859.

== Civil War ==
In 1861 he was assigned to the steam sloop Richmond and served in her with the Western Gulf Blockading Squadron throughout the Civil War. He participated in the engagement with the Confederate ram CSS Manassas during the Battle of the Head of Passes on October 12, 1861, the artillery duel with Fort McRee and other shore batteries in Pensacola Bay on 22 November, the passage of Forts Jackson and St. Philip, and the capture of New Orleans in late April 1862.

After New Orleans, David Farragut's force moved up the Mississippi, and Terry was present when the salt water fleet ran the gauntlet at Vicksburg and joined Flag Officer Charles Henry Davis' riverine fleet above the Confederate stronghold. In January 1863, Terry was promoted to lieutenant commander. On March 14, his ship joined others of the fleet in bombarding the batteries surrounding Port Hudson so that Farragut could dash past them and establish a blockade cutting the Confederacy's Red River supply line. In his last major engagement, the Battle of Mobile Bay on August 5, 1864, Terry helped to close the last major Confederate port on the Gulf of Mexico.

== Post-war assignments ==
Following the Civil War, Terry alternated between sea duty and a series of shore assignments at the Naval Academy. In 1866–67, he served in the Pacific Squadron in the steam frigate Powhatan. On December 25, 2867, he married, in Detroit, to Marion, daughter of the explorer and trader Robert Stuart. They had no children

His first tour of duty at the Naval Academy followed in 1868–69. He assumed his first command, Saco, in 1870 and cruised with the Asiatic Fleet until 1872. During that assignment, on October 30, 1871, he was promoted to commander. Terry returned to the Naval Academy in 1873, and in 1875 was appointed Commandant of Midshipmen, a post he held until 1878.

Terry was then ordered to the Pacific Squadron to serve as Flag Captain in Pensacola; first to Rear Admiral C. R. Perry Rodgers, then in 1880–81 to Rear Admiral Thomas H. Stevens.

In 1881, he went on leave due to illness. On June 1, 1882, Commander Terry died at Manitou Springs, Colorado.

== Namesake ==
Two ships in the United States Navy have been named USS Terry for him.
