= USS Cherokee (AT-66) =

Tugboat of the United States Navy

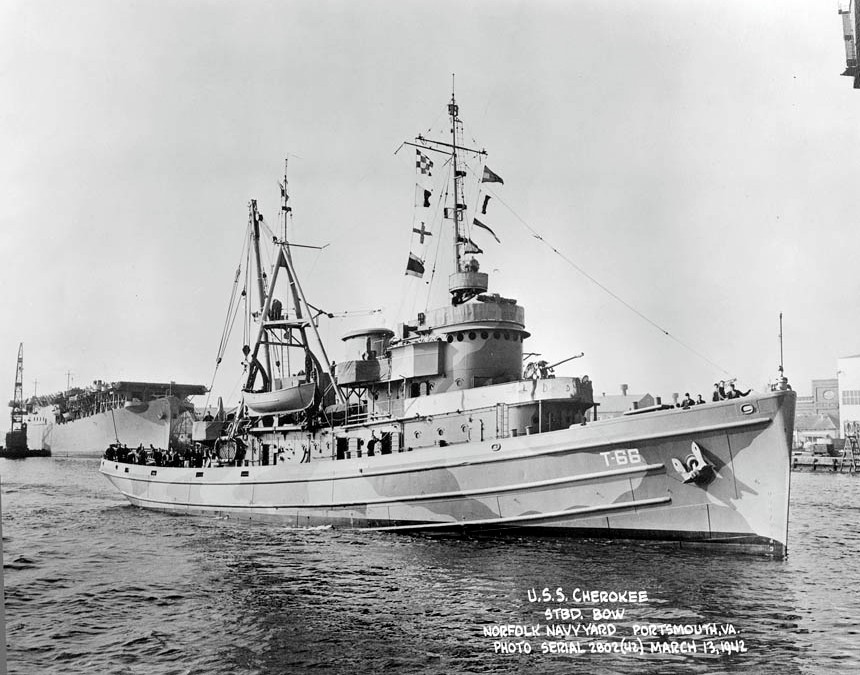
- Cherokee underway off Norfolk Navy Yard, 13 March 1942

History

United States
- Name: USS Cherokee
- Builder: Bethlehem Staten Island
- Launched: 10 November 1939
- Sponsored by: Miss E. Mark
- Commissioned: 26 April 1940
- Decommissioned: 29 June 1946
- Reclassified: ATF-66 on 15 May 1944
- Honors and awards: one battle star for World War II service
- Fate: 29 June 1946 transferred to US Coast Guard to become a medium endurance cutter; Sunk as a target in the 1990s

General characteristics
- Class & type: Navajo-class fleet tug, later became Cherokee-class fleet tug
- Displacement: 1,240 tons
- Length: 205 ft (62 m)
- Beam: 38 ft 6 in (11.73 m)
- Draft: 15 ft 4 in (4.67 m)
- Speed: 16 kn (30 km/h; 18 mph)
- Complement: 85
- Armament: 1 x 3-inch (76 mm) gun

USS Cherokee (AT-66) was a US Navy fleet tug of the Navajo class, later renamed the Cherokee class. She was launched on 10 November 1939 by Bethlehem Shipbuilding Corp., Staten Island, New York and sponsored by Miss E. Mark; and commissioned 26 April 1940. Cherokee served during World War II in the North African campaign. She was redesignated ATF-66 on 15 May 1944.

Following the loss during World War II of the first two ships of the class, the Navajo and the Seminole, the class was renamed from its original pre-war name of Navajo-class to Cherokee-class, after this third ship built in 1939.

== Operations ==
Prewar days found Cherokee sailing on towing duties along the east coast of the United States and in the Caribbean. As United States naval ships took up convoy escort duties in the western Atlantic to support beleaguered Britain, and as Iceland was occupied by American forces, Cherokee's operating area expanded to Newfoundland and Iceland. Similar operations continued until 23 October 1942, when Cherokee sailed from Norfolk, Virginia, for the invasion of North Africa. The only tug to accompany the vast invasion fleet across the Atlantic to French Morocco, Cherokee served well off the beaches during their assault 8 through 11 November 1942, and on 11 and 12 November 1942 she aided two of the destroyers torpedoed by enemy aircraft.

The tug remained in North African waters to care for the many ships concentrating there with men and supplies until 31 March 1943. Fitted with tanks, she served as a yard oiler at Casablanca until 3 May, when she departed for Norfolk. After overhaul, she reported at Bermuda 20 June 1943 to provide tug, towing, and salvage services to the escort vessels and submarines conducting training there.

Cherokee was reclassified fleet ocean tug ATF-66 on 15 May 1944. Twice in 1944 she crossed the Atlantic to Casablanca to take stricken destroyers in tow for the United States, carrying out these difficult assignments with distinguished seamanship. Upon her return from the second of these crossings in July 1944, Cherokee took up duty towing targets for ships in training in Casco Bay, Maine, until 28 May 1945, and at Guantanamo Bay, Cuba, until 23 July 1945. Following the war she continued towing operations in the Caribbean, along the east coast, and to Brazilian ports until she was decommissioned 29 June 1946 and transferred to the US Coast Guard that same day to become USCGC Cherokee (WAT-165). She was designated medium endurance cutter WMEC-165 in 1965.

Cherokee served with the US Coast Guard under the same name and in various designations, as WAT-165 then redesignated medium endurance cutter WMEC-165 in 1965. She was returned to the U.S. Navy, stricken in 1991, and sunk as a target later in the 1990s.
