= USS Arikara =

Tugboat of the United States Navy

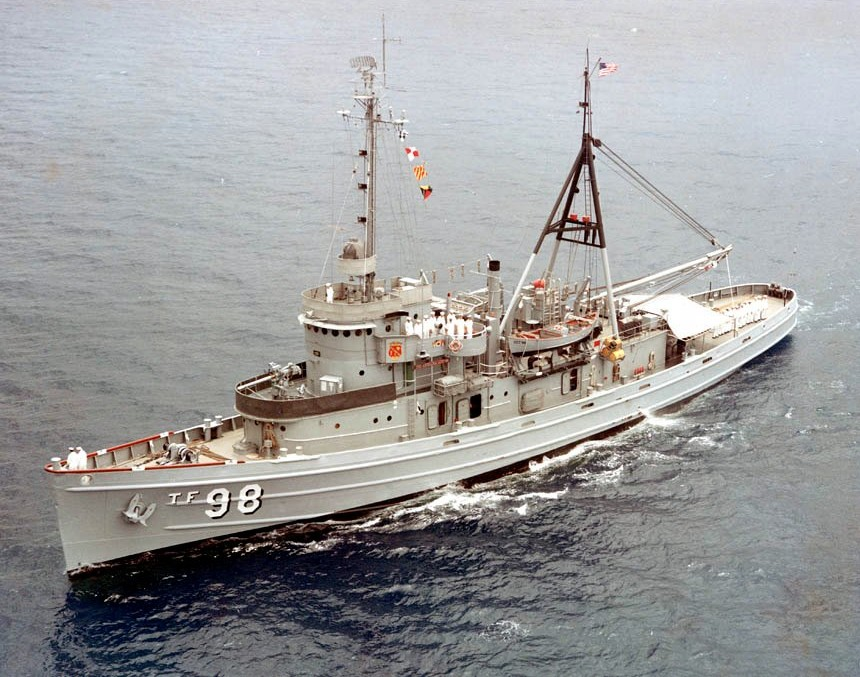
- Arikara underway near Oahu, Hawaii, June 3, 1964

History

United States
- Laid down: January 10, 1943
- Launched: June 22, 1943
- Commissioned: January 5, 1944
- Decommissioned: July 1, 1971
- Reclassified: May 15, 1944
- Stricken: June 25, 1992
- Honors and awards: 3 battle stars, World War II; 5 battle stars, Korean War; 3 battle stars, Vietnam War
- Fate: Transferred to the Chilean Navy, July 1, 1971

History

Chile
- Name: Aldea (ATF-63)
- Acquired: July 1, 1971
- Decommissioned: August 14, 1992
- Fate: Sunk as target, 1992

General characteristics
- Displacement: 1,589 tons
- Length: 205 ft 0 in (62.48 m)
- Beam: 38 ft 6 in (11.73 m)
- Draught: 15 ft 4 in (4.67 m)
- Propulsion: 4 × ALCO 531 diesel main engines; 4 × General Electric generators; 1 Cooper Bessemer FS6 200 KW generators and 2 Superior Engine 100 KW generators auxiliary services engines; single screw; 3,000 shp
- Speed: 16.5 knots (30.6 km/h)
- Complement: 85
- Armament: 1 x 3 in (76 mm); 2 x 40 mm

USS Arikara (AT-98) was an Abnaki-class of fleet ocean tug. It was named after the Arikara, a loose confederacy of sub-tribes of American Indians related to the Pawnee. The Arikara inhabited villages in the Missouri River valley.

== World War II Atlantic service ==
The Arikara was laid down on January 10, 1943, at Charleston, South Carolina, by the Charleston Shipbuilding & Drydock Company; launched on June 22, 1943; sponsored by Mrs. Taylor F. McCoy; and commissioned on January 5, 1944.

On January 15, the tug departed Charleston bound for Hampton Roads, Virginia. After arriving there on the 17th, she conducted shakedown training in Chesapeake Bay until the 26th. Following a post-shakedown repair period in the Norfolk Navy Yard, she stood out of the bay and shaped a northerly course. After stopping briefly at New York, Arikara moved on to Casco Bay, Maine, where she operated between February 10 and March 2 towing targets and participating in antisubmarine warfare training. She returned to New York on March 4 and began preparations for service overseas. Towing barges, the tug put to sea on March 25 as part of Task Force (TF) 67 bound for the British Isles. She reached Falmouth, England, on April 20 and, after delivering the barges, reported for duty with the 12th Fleet.

On the 24th, Arikara moved to Lee-on-the-Solent to join the British tug fleet in preparing for the invasion of Normandy. During the following weeks, the vessel assisted in transporting components of the Mulberry artificial harbours to staging areas along England's southern coast. These prefabricated harbours were intended to provide logistical support to Allied forces following the landings in France.

On May 15, 1944, she was reclassified a fleet tug and redesignated ATF-98. Throughout the period leading up to the invasion, Arikara helped to repel German air attacks. Although several bombs exploded near the vessel, she was not hit and sustained no significant damage.

== Operation Overlord ==
On the afternoon of June 5, the tug stood out of Weymouth, England, on her way to the sector of the Normandy coast code-named by Allied planners as "Omaha Beach". After the first waves of assault troops stormed ashore, the tug began her primary assignment, clearing wrecks from the beach area reserved for the erection of the artificial harbors. Soon, however, German fire began to take such a heavy toll of landing craft that Arikara had to abandon salvage operations in favor of the even more urgent work of rescue and repair. Her work enabled the less heavily damaged landing craft to remain in action, thus maintaining the flow of troops and supplies during the critical phase of the assault on "Omaha" Beach.

That phase past, the tug resumed salvage and towing work on the 7th. In all, she spent almost a month supporting the consolidation of the Normandy invasion. Though she came under air attacks and fire from shore batteries, her only major damage came from the explosion of a nearby mine while she was towing the disabled French frigate La Surprise back to England for repairs. Her main engine room rapidly took on water which rose to within six inches of her main electric motor before her crew managed to check the leaks. Arikara completed her mission successfully, and, after 24 hours of feverish activity, her crew had her repaired and back in action off Normandy.

== Mediterranean service ==
Early in July, Arikara and USS Pinto received orders to return to England. From there, the two tugs set out on July 12 in a convoy bound for the Mediterranean coast of North Africa. Her convoy arrived at Oran, Algeria, on the 21st; but Arikara remained there only until the end of the month. She headed for Italy on August 1, reached Naples on the 3d, and joined Rear Admiral Spencer S. Lewis' TF 87, code-named "Camel" Force, for the mid-August invasion of southern France. Staged through Ajaccio, Corsica, Arikara's unit, the force's salvage and fire-fighting group, arrived off St. Raphael on the Mediterranean coast of France on the morning of August 15, the day of the assault. For more than a fortnight, the tug remained in the transport area, salvaging damaged ships and landing craft, fighting fires, and keeping the approaches to the beach clear of wrecks. On September 2, she moved to the Gulf of San Tropez, France, and began clearing wreckage from French Riviera ports. She also towed ships to Palermo, Sicily, where they underwent repairs. In addition, she made towing voyages to Naples, Marseilles, Bizerte, and Oran.

== Transfer to Pacific ==
Late in October at the latter port, Arikara joined a convoy bound for the United States and headed home. She arrived in Norfolk on November 7 and remained in that vicinity into December. Late in that month, she voyaged to Trinidad where she took YFD-6 in tow before continuing on to the Panama Canal. Arikara reached the Canal Zone on January 3, 1945, transited the canal, and delivered her tow at Cristóbal on the 5th. The following day, she and Bannock (ATF-81) got underway for Hawaii. The tug entered Pearl Harbor later in January but remained there only until resuming her westward voyage on February 4, bound ultimately for the Ryukyu Islands. After stops at Eniwetok and Guam, she reached Ulithi Atoll, in the Carolines, on March 17. There, she reported for duty with Service Squadron (ServRon) 10 and began preparations for the conquest of Okinawa.

Ten days later, she departed Ulithi as part of Task Group (TG) 50.8, the 5th Fleet Logistics Support Group, and headed for the Ryukyu Islands. To begin the campaign, during the last week in March, American forces took Kerama Retto, a small group of islands about 15 miles west of southern Okinawa. Then, on April 1, the main assault force landed on Okinawa proper. Arikara spent the next 11 weeks based at Kerama Retto assisting ships and craft damaged in the struggle for Okinawa. On the night of April 2, the tug went to the assistance of USS Dickerson after that high-speed transport had suffered a devastating suicide crash from a Kawasaki Ki-45 "Nick" twin-engine reconnaissance/ground attack aircraft. Arikara's crew managed to extinguish the fires raging on board the Dickerson, and the tug took her in tow for Kerama Retto. In spite of Arikara's efforts, Dickerson proved to be beyond economical salvage and was towed out to sea on April 4 and sunk.

Although Arikara's main mission at Okinawa was the removal and salvage of damaged landing craft, kamikaze attacks continued to add to her burdens. On May 11, a horde of suicide planes attacked USS Evans and USS Hugh W. Hadley on picket station no. 15 to the northwest of Okinawa. Arikara sped to the aid of Evans, which had sustained four suicide crashes in rapid succession. Arikara moved alongside her, put five pumps on board, made fast a hawser, and towed the destroyer into Kerama Retto for repairs.

A bit over a week later, on May 17, USS Longshaw — her officers and crew drained by long hours at general quarters and a night of illumination fire in support of the troops ashore — ran aground on a reef near Naha while en route to yet another call fire mission. Arikara rushed to her aid. Just when she began taking up slack on the towline, a Japanese shore battery opened up on the stranded destroyer with uncanny accuracy. The enemy artillerists straddled Longshaw immediately, and quickly scored four hits. One of the four caused a forward magazine to detonate blowing off the bow forward of the bridge. With Longshaw a total loss, Arikara parted the towline and moved off to see to her own defense and to rescue survivors. Longshaw was later destroyed by "friendly" gunfire and torpedoes.

Arikara performed salvage work in the Ryūkyūs well into June. On the 19th of that month, she took kamikaze-damaged Evans in tow and set course for the Marianas. The tug arrived at Saipan on June 25 and remained there until July 11. From Saipan, she sailed to Leyte where she stayed through August 18 when she got underway for Japan. The tug stopped at Okinawa before proceeding on to Kyushu. She returned to Okinawa briefly in September and then continued on to the Philippines. On October 9, while still en route to Leyte, the ship weathered a severe typhoon. After reaching Subic Bay, she underwent repairs until getting underway late in November for China. Upon reaching Tsingtao, Arikara began towing and salvage work in support of occupation forces.

Late in February 1946, Arikara left China to resume operations in the eastern and Central Pacific. During the next few years, her towing and salvage operations took her to such varied locales as the Panama Canal Zone, the west coast of the United States, Hawaii, Okinawa, and the Marianas.

== Korean War Service ==
In January 1950, the tug resumed occupation duty upon her arrival at Yokosuka and, for the next five months, provided towing and salvage services in Japan. However, on June 25, 1950, North Korean forces surged south across the 38th parallel into South Korea. Thus, Arikara entered her second war. She was assigned to TF 90, the Amphibious Force, Far East. Due to the skeletal nature of American naval forces in Oriental waters, her assignments early in July consisted of the unlikely duty of escorting shipping between Japan and Korea until an escort group of more suitable warships could be assembled. The tug also served as a communications ship and landing control vessel during amphibious operations at Pusan on the southeastern tip of the Korean peninsula. In addition, she performed her familiar salvage and rescue operations.

After completing her initial missions at Pusan and between that port and Japan, Arikara moved to other areas of the Korean peninsula. On September 5, she departed Yokosuka with Task Unit (TU) 90.04.3, the Pontoon Movement Unit, on her way to Inchon on the western coast of Korea. The tug supported the amphibious assault at Inchon from mid-September to mid-October, before heading, on the 16th of the latter month, for Wonsan on the northeastern coast of Korea. The October 20 amphibious assault on Wonsan, mooted by the arrival of rapidly advancing Republic of Korea (ROK) ground forces, was transformed into an enormous reinforcement and logistical support operation. Arikara spent about a month at Wonsan helping to clear the harbor and to increase its efficiency.

During the latter part of November, she completed upkeep at Sasebo. Towing and salvage operations in Japanese waters occupied her during December 1950 and early January 1951. Then, on January 12, the tug shaped a course back to the United States. Voyaging by way of the Marianas and Hawaii, she arrived in Long Beach, California, in March. By the beginning of April, Arikara was at Bremerton, Washington, undergoing repairs; and she remained there until heading back to Hawaii on June 11. For the remainder of 1951, she operated out of Pearl Harbor making only two voyages to destinations outside the Hawaiian operating area. In July, the ship towed an AFDB to Guam; in August, she returned to Pearl Harbor; and, in October and November, she made a round-trip voyage to Subic Bay in the Philippines.

On January 3, 1952, Arikara departed Pearl Harbor to deploy again to the western Pacific. By the end of the month, she was back in the Korean combat zone. During that tour of duty in the Far East, the tug served once more at Wonsan, as well as at Cho Do and Pusan, and stayed in the waters between Japan and Korea until the beginning of August. That fall, Arikara moved to the Marshall Islands to support Operation Ivy, a nuclear bomb test conducted at Eniwetok Atoll in November 1952. Although the conflict lasted into the summer of 1953, the tug saw no additional service in the Korean combat zone.

By the time that an armistice ended hostilities in Korea on July 27, 1953, Arikara had already settled into a schedule of operations out of Pearl Harbor that included towing missions from Hawaii to Johnston and Kanton Island islands and duty in the Aleutians. In the fall of 1954, the tug began peacetime deployments to the Far East and, for the remainder of her Navy career, she alternated between assignments in the western Pacific with the 7th Fleet and operations out of her home port, Pearl Harbor. During the first 12 years of that period, the tug's Far Eastern itinerary included mostly Japanese, Korean, and Philippine ports of call while her operations out of Pearl Harbor took her to the waters off the coast of Alaska and surrounding the Aleutians, as well as to islands in the Central Pacific.

== Vietnam Service, transfer to Chile and fate ==
Late in 1964, American involvement in the conflict in South Vietnam increased dramatically. As a consequence, Arikara began to visit the Vietnamese coast more frequently. By the fall of 1966, the tug found herself calling at such places as Vũng Tàu and Da Nang to provide towing and other support services for Navy units engaged in fighting communist insurgency and North Vietnamese aggression in South Vietnam. Her deployments to Asian waters along with the concomitant service in Vietnam continued into 1970.

Late in February of that year, Arikara returned to Pearl Harbor from her final tour of duty with the 7th Fleet. She served actively in the Hawaiian Islands and in Alaskan waters for another 16 months. On July 1, 1971, the tug was decommissioned and simultaneously transferred to Chile as a loan under the military assistance program. She was commissioned in the Chilean Navy as Aldea (ATF-63). She was decommissioned by the Chilean Navy on August 14, 1992, and later sunk as a target.

Arikara earned three battle stars during World War II, five battle stars during the Korean War, and three battle stars for service in the Vietnam War.
