= USS Lipan =

Tugboat of the United States Navy

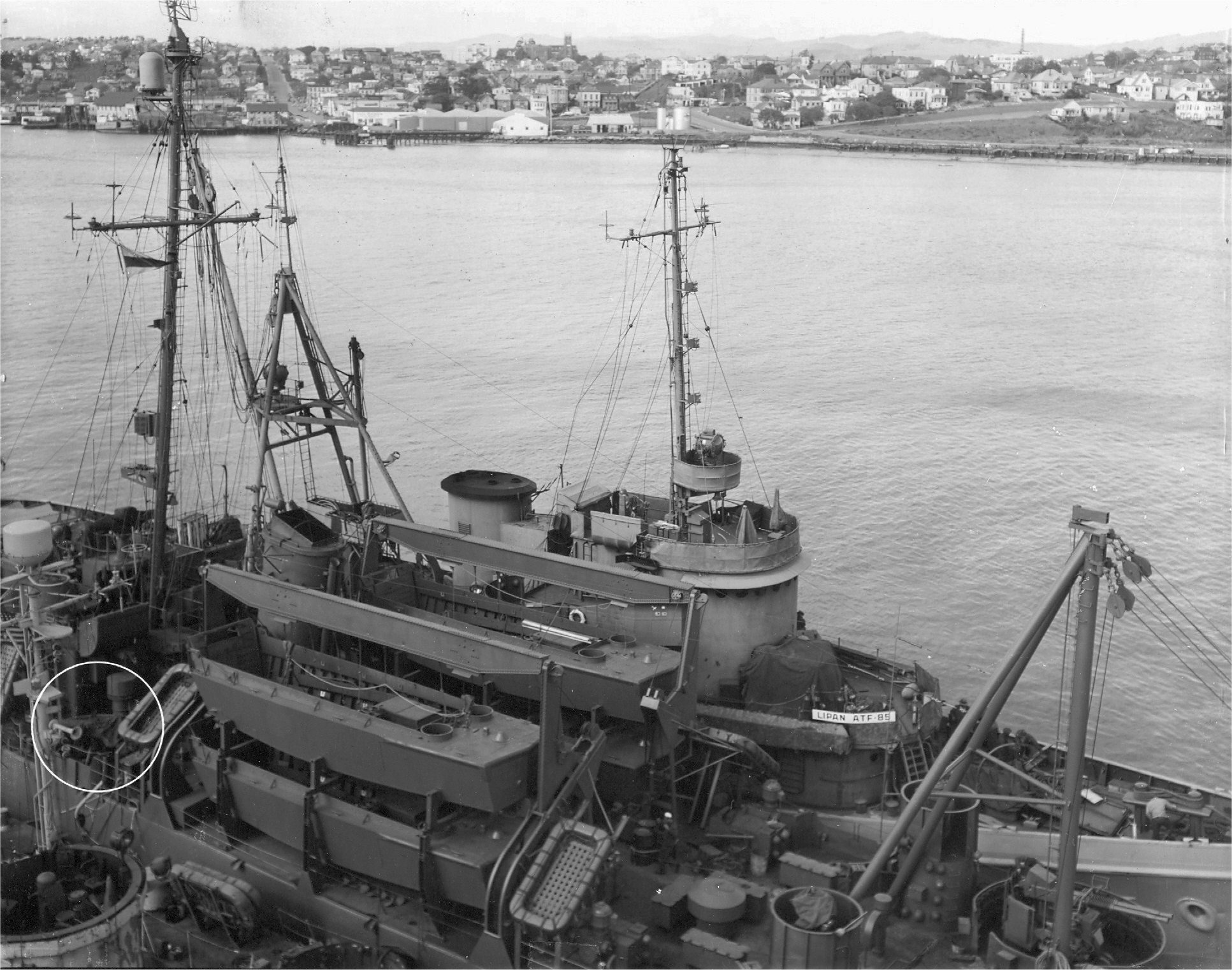
- USS Lipan (ATF-85) moored outboard of USS Horace A. Bass (APD-124) at Mare Island Naval Shipyard, 8 April 1946.

History

United States
- Name: USS Lipan
- Builder: United Engineering Co., San Francisco, California
- Laid down: 30 May 1942
- Launched: 17 September 1942
- Commissioned: 29 April 1943
- Reclassified: ATF-85, 15 May 1944; USNS Lipan (T-ATF-85), 1972
- Stricken: 23 January 1989
- Honors and awards: 2 battle stars (World War II); 4 battle stars (Korea)
- Fate: Loaned to the United States Coast Guard, 30 September 1980

United States
- Name: USCGC Lipan (WMEC-85)
- Acquired: 30 September 1980
- Decommissioned: 31 March 1988
- Fate: Returned to US Navy, 31 March 1988; Sunk as a target, 22 January 1990

General characteristics
- Class & type: Navajo-class fleet tug
- Displacement: 1,235 long tons (1,255 t)
- Length: 205 ft (62 m)
- Beam: 38 ft 6 in (11.73 m)
- Draft: 15 ft 4 in (4.67 m)
- Propulsion: Diesel-electric; four General Motors 12-278A diesel main engines driving four General Electric generators and three General Motors 3-268A auxiliary services engines; single screw; 3,600 shp (2,685 kW)
- Speed: 16 knots (30 km/h; 18 mph)
- Complement: 85
- Armament: 1 × 3 in (76 mm) gun; 2 × twin 40 mm gun mounts; 2 × single 20 mm guns

USS Lipan (AT-85) was a Navajo-class fleet tug constructed for the United States Navy during World War II. Her purpose was to aid ships, usually by towing, on the high seas or in combat or post-combat areas, plus "other duties as assigned." She served in the Pacific Ocean during World War II and the Korean War. She was awarded two battle stars for World War II and four battle stars for the Korean War.

Lipan was laid down 30 May 1942 by United Engineering Co., San Francisco, California; launched on 17 September 1942; sponsored by Miss Jean Kell; and commissioned on 29 April 1943.

== World War II Pacific Theater operations ==
After shakedown in Puget Sound and San Francisco, California, harbor duty, the new ocean-going tug departed with three lighters for the New Hebrides and arrived Espiritu Santo on 2 October. She towed war equipment and supplies from Espiritu Santo to the new base at Guadalcanal until 20 November. Transferring to Guadalcanal on 6 December, Lipan was redesignated ATF-85 (fleet ocean tug) on 13 April and operated in the Solomons during the first half of 1944.

== Supporting the invasion of Saipan ==
Lipan departed Guadalcanal on 4 June with Rear Admiral Reifsnider's Southern Transport Attack Group for the scheduled assault on Guam. When the invasion of Guam was postponed by the Battle of the Philippine Sea, the ship joined Service Squadron 10 at Eniwetok on 3 July supporting the invasion of Saipan. Departing on 8 July with barge in tow, she arrived at Saipan on 15 July and remained under constant enemy fire until 20 July, then rejoined Admiral Reifsnider's group at Agat Bay, Guam, on D-Day, 21 July. During the two weeks of fierce fighting after D-Day, Lipan rescued landing craft grounded by the treacherous surf ringing Agat Bay. Once the U.S. Marines had gained a foothold, the tug towed supply ships bringing in reinforcements to liberate the island and transform Guam into an advanced base for the Philippine campaign.

== Supporting Leyte operations ==
Returning to Eniwetok on 30 September, she sailed for Ulithi with two boats in tow on 12 October, arrived the 20th, and performed ready tow service to aid the ships liberating Leyte. Taking Houston (CL-81) in tandem tow with tug Arapaho (ATF-68) the ship sailed on 14 December for Manus and arrived on 21 December. Dropping the tow, she immediately set course for home and made San Francisco on 9 January 1945.

== Supporting Okinawa operations ==
After overhaul Lipan departed for Okinawa on 24 February dropped fuel barges at Pearl Harbor and Guam, and arrived on 1 May. Three days later, as the Japanese intensified the suicide attacks in a costly but futile campaign to hold Okinawa, the tug undertook salvage and firefighting duties. For two and a half months, as the savage attacks continued, Lipan salvaged and rescued damaged Navy ships off the beaches of Okinawa.

== Under attack by kamikaze aircraft ==
The ship's closest brush with disaster came late afternoon on 21 June. While she was towing the already salvaged Barry (APD-29) to Ie Shima escorted by LSM-59, two suicide aircraft attacked the convoy. One immediately crashed and sank LSM-59. The second barely missed Lipan and crashed into Barry which sank the next day. The tug made Ie Shima and returned to Okinawa the 25th.

== End-of-war operations ==
With Okinawa nearly secure, the ship departed for overhaul at Leyte on 18 July and arrived on 1 August. Overhaul completed after V-J Day, she departed for a supposedly peaceful run to Okinawa, on 23 September, with two boats in tow.

== Damaged in a typhoon ==
While Lipan was en route on 30 September a typhoon with 50-foot (15 m) seas and winds over 100 knots (190 km/h) battered the tug with 55° rolls, snapping the tow, and starting a fire which destroyed the propulsion panel and the lower motor room. After riding out the storm, she made Subic Bay on 7 October. Following extensive repairs, Lipan sailed for San Francisco on 3 December and arrived on Christmas Day.

== Post-war activity ==
During the postwar years, Lipan towed gasoline barges, landing craft, disabled submarines, floating drydocks, and target sleds in operations off the U.S. West Coast and in the western Pacific.

== Korean War operations ==
With the outbreak of the Korean War, Lipan departed Long Beach, California, for the Orient on 20 June 1950. The tug arrived Yokosuka, Japan, on 15 July and shoved off that afternoon to deliver mail and medical supplies to Task force TF 90 in Korean waters. She called at Hoko Ko, Korea (18–24 July) and returned for harbor services at Yokosuka until 5 September. She then steamed with TF 90 for Inchon Harbor for the brilliant flanking amphibious assault.

As the landing forces swept ashore and caught the North Koreans completely by surprise, the tug cast off her pontoon tows, and began various towing and salvage assignments. A month later she was relieved at Inchon and steamed for Pusan en route to duty along the east coast of Korea. Arriving Riwon Harbor near Wonsan on 1 November Lipan planted channel buoys, retracted 23 damaged LSTs from the beach, and recovered lost anchors in Wonsan Harbor, then steamed north and laid buoys at Hŭngnam Harbor and Songjin Harbor. Returning to Wonsan on 26 November, she left the next day for Sasebo, Japan, and arrived the 30th.

For the next two months the tug towed Army pontoon barges from Inchon to Taechon, Korea, or back to Sasebo. She sailed from Sasebo to Yokohama on 16 February with SS Cecil N. Bean in tow, and steamed independently for Pearl Harbor the 18th, arriving on 1 March.

After a three-month overhaul and towing missions to the Marshall Islands and Subic Bay, she departed Hawaii on 26 November for a six-month tour of duty at Apra Harbor, Guam, then returned to Pearl Harbor on 9 June 1952. For the next eleven months she again operated between Hawaii and the Marshalls. On 2 May 1953 the tug left Pearl Harbor for towing duty between Sasebo and various Korean ports such as Inchon, Pusan, and Wonsan. She returned to Hawaii on 19 November.

== Post-Korean War activity ==
The Lipan was home ported in Pearl Harbor from 1954 to 1973 and San Diego until the ships decommissioning in July 1973. The tug continued to meet the towing and salvage needs of the U.S. Pacific Fleet from the west coast to the western Pacific.

== Assigned to the Military Sealift Command ==
She was assigned to the Military Sealift Command (MSC) 31 July 1973 and placed in service as USNS Lipan (T-ATF-85).

On 5 August 1974 the fleet tug collided with the 634-foot tanker Atlantic Prestige in the Straits of Juan de Fuca between Vancouver Island and Washington state while towing another vessel. 26 of the 34 men aboard the tug were taken to Bellingham, Washington, and the tug was beached.

== On loan to the Coast Guard ==
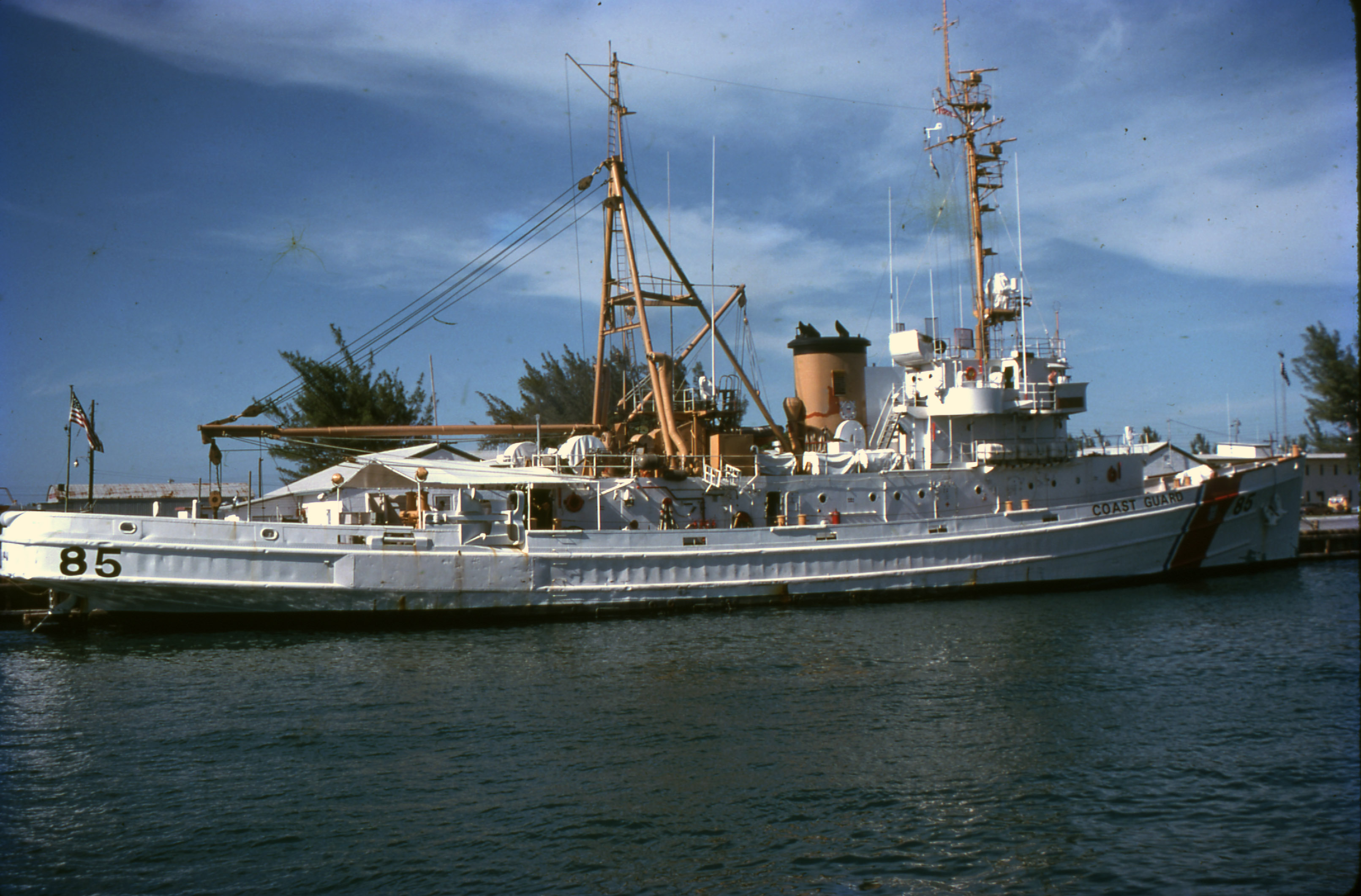
USCGC Lipan (WMEC-85) in Key West

Lipan was placed out of service, c. 1980, and transferred on loan to the United States Coast Guard. She was commissioned, USCGC Lipan (WMEC-85) on 30 September 1980 and served the Coast Guard until she was decommissioned, on 31 March 1988 and returned to U.S. Naval custody.

== Decommissioning ==
Lipan was struck from the Naval Register on 23 January 1989 and sunk as a target on 22 January 1990.

== Awards ==
Lipan received two battle stars for World War II service and four battle stars for Korean service.
