= USS Arapaho (ATF-68) =

Tugboat of the United States Navy

History

United States
- Name: USS Arapaho
- Namesake: Arapaho
- Builder: Charleston Shipbuilding and Drydock Company, Charleston, South Carolina
- Laid down: 8 November 1941
- Launched: 22 June 1942
- Sponsored by: Mrs. Alice Posey Hatcher
- Commissioned: 20 January 1943
- Decommissioned: 15 January 1947
- Stricken: 10 July 1961
- Identification: AT-68 (1943–1944); ATF-68 (1944–1961)
- Honours and awards: Four battle stars during World War II
- Fate: Transferred to the Argentine Navy, 1961

Argentina
- Name: ARA Comandante General Zapiola
- Acquired: 1961
- Fate: Wrecked 10 January 1976

General characteristics
- Class & type: Navajo-class fleet ocean tug
- Tonnage: 1,235 tons
- Displacement: 1,674 tons
- Length: 205 ft 0 in (62.5 m)
- Beam: 38 ft 6 in (11.7 m)
- Draft: 15 ft 4 in (4.7 m)
- Propulsion: diesel-electric, 4 × General Motors 12-278A diesel main engines; 4 × General Electric generators; 3 × General Motors 3-268A auxiliary services engines; 1 × screw, 3,600 shp (2,700 kW)
- Speed: 16.5 knots (30.6 km/h; 19.0 mph)
- Complement: 85
- Armament: 1 × single 3 in (76 mm) dual purpose gun mount; 2 × twin 40 mm AA gun mounts; 2 × single 20 mm AA gun mounts

USS Arapaho (AT-68/ATF-68) was a Navajo-class fleet ocean tug which served the U.S. Navy during World War II with her towing services. She was assigned initially to support the U.S. Atlantic Fleet, and was eventually assigned to support Allied forces in the war zones of the Pacific Ocean, resulting in her crew returning home after the war with four battle stars to their credit.

== US Navy career ==
The second ship to be so named by the Navy, Arapaho (AT-68) was laid down on 8 November 1941 at Charleston, South Carolina, by the Charleston Shipbuilding & Dry-dock Company; launched on 22 June 1942; sponsored by Mrs. Alice Posey Hatcher; and commissioned on 20 January 1943.

=== World War II service ===
International radio call sign of USS Arapaho (ATF-68)
November	Uniform	Delta	Bravo

==== East coast operations ====
The tug conducted her shakedown training in the vicinity of Key West, Florida, and returned to Norfolk, Virginia, to prepare for a transatlantic voyage. On 19 March, she sailed for Casablanca, Morocco. There, she took the torpedo-damaged attack cargo ship Almaack (AKA-10) in tow for the voyage back to the United States. She and her charge arrived back in Norfolk, Virginia, on 20 May.

In mid-June, the tug moved south to search the Florida Strait for the submarine R-12 (SS-89), which had sunk as a result of battery explosions. After fruitlessly seeking this ship from 18 to 23 June, Arapaho set sail on 25 June—apparently from Key West, Florida—with a barge in tow on her way to Panama. She left the barge in the Panama Canal Zone and continued her voyage to San Diego, California, where she arrived on 15 July.

==== Pacific Ocean operations ====
For the next three months, the tug conducted towing and salvage operations, first along the U.S. West Coast and then, from early in September, out of Pearl Harbor. On 16 October, Arapaho departed Hawaii with two supply lighters in tow, bound for the Ellice Islands. She reached Funafuti on 30 October and began heavy towing operations between the Ellice and Gilbert Islands. For a time, she served as an antisubmarine guard ship at recently captured Tarawa Atoll.

On 4 December, Arapaho embarked 12 civilians who had been liberated from a Japanese internment camp on Makin and set sail—via Funafuti—for Pearl Harbor. From Funafuti, the tug steamed in company with aircraft carrier Independence (CVL-22), severely damaged in the Gilbert Islands operation by an aerial torpedo. The ships arrived at Pearl Harbor on 18 December.

Arapaho underwent repairs until near the end of the first week in January 1944. On 6 January, she headed back to the Gilberts. Over the next five months, the tug was based successively at Tarawa and Majuro, though she made numerous tows to other islands in the Gilbert, Marshall, and Ellice groups. By 13 June, she had moved her base of operations to Eniwetok where she engaged in harbor duty and salvage work. On 3 July, Arapaho set a course for Pearl Harbor, which she reached on the 9th to begin a month of repairs. She returned to Eniwetok on 26 August and, except for a round-trip voyage to Guam, operated there until the second week in October.

==== Ulithi operations ====
At that time, she put to sea towing auxiliary repair dock ARD-15 and covered lighter (self-propelled) YF-786 to Ulithi, Service Squadron (ServRon) 10's new advanced base, and, following her arrival at that atoll, worked in and out of its lagoon engaged in harbor and salvage duties.

Between 4 and 10 November, she assisted Zuni (ATF-95) in towing Reno (CL-96) into Ulithi. The light cruiser had been torpedoed by a Japanese submarine off the San Bernardino Strait on the 3d. In December, the tug towed Houston (CL-81) from Ulithi to Manus in the Admiralty Islands. From there, she towed fuel barge YO-186 to Kossol Passage in the Palau Islands. After towing LST-278 to Guam in January 1945, Arapaho returned to Ulithi on the 23d and began a major overhaul of her main propulsion plant. The ship completed repairs and returned to active duty on 18 March.

==== Okinawa operations ====
She operated out of Ulithi until mid-June when she moved to Guam. From there, the tug headed for Okinawa on 5 July with auxiliary repair dock ARD-26 in tow. Arapaho and the auxiliary repair dock arrived in Kerama Retto 10 days later. The tug remained at Okinawa until after the end of hostilities in mid-August. Late that month, she voyaged back to Guam to pick up ARD-21 for tow to Okinawa. She returned to Kerama Retto with her charge on 7 September and resumed local towing duty.

=== End-of-war decommissioning ===
That assignment continued until 9 November 1945 when she began the long journey back to the United States. She stopped at Pearl Harbor for a few days early in December and arrived in San Pedro, Los Angeles, on 27th. Arapaho remained at San Pedro assigned to the inactive fleet awaiting inactivation overhaul for a little more than a year. On 8 and 9 January 1947, she was towed to San Diego, California, where she was decommissioned on 15 January 1947. She remained with the Pacific Reserve Fleet until July 1961. On 1 July 1961, her name was struck from the Navy list.

=== Honors and awards ===
Arapaho (ATF-68) earned four battle stars during World War II.

== Argentine Navy career ==
On 10 July 1961, she was transferred to the Argentine Navy, which commissioned her that same day as ARA Comandante General Zapiola. The tug remained active with the Argentine Navy until 10 January 1976 when she ran aground on an Antarctic reef and was declared a total loss. Her crew was rescued by the Chilean patrol boat Piloto Pardo.

== See also ==
- List of auxiliary ships of the Argentine Navy
