= USS Zuni =

Tugboat of the United States Navy

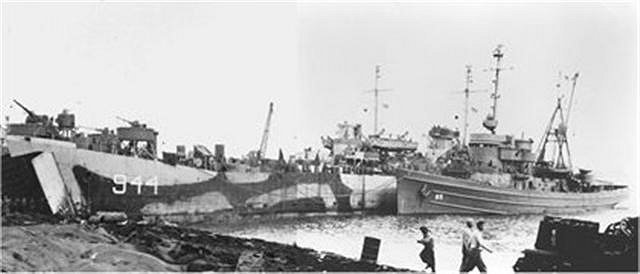
- USS Zuni (ATF-95) on Yellow Beach, Iwo Jima, 23 March 1945, assisting USS LST-944 in beaching, later became USCGC Tamaroa (WMEC-166)

History

United States
- Name: USS Zuni
- Builder: Commercial Iron Works, Portland, Oregon
- Laid down: 8 March 1943
- Launched: 31 July 1943
- Commissioned: 9 October 1943
- Decommissioned: 29 June 1946
- Stricken: 19 July 1946
- Identification: ATF-95
- Nickname(s): "The Mighty Z"
- Fate: Transferred to United States Coast Guard

United States
- Name: USCGC Tamaroa (WAT-166) (1946 - 1956); USCGC Tamaroa (WATF-166) (1956 - 1966); USCGC Tamaroa (WMEC-166)
- Commissioned: 29 June 1946
- Decommissioned: 1 February 1994
- Fate: Sunk as an artificial reef, 2017

General characteristics
- Class & type: Navajo-class fleet tug
- Displacement: 1,731 long tons (1,759 t)
- Length: 205 ft 6 in (62.64 m)
- Beam: 39 ft 3.25 in (11.9698 m)
- Draft: 18 ft (5.5 m)
- Propulsion: 4 × General Motors model 12-278 diesels with diesel-electric drive: 3,010 shp (2,240 kW)
- Speed: 16.1 kn (29.8 km/h; 18.5 mph) maximum; 8.0 kn (14.8 km/h; 9.2 mph) economical
- Range: 15,000 nmi (28,000 km; 17,000 mi) at 8 kn (15 km/h; 9.2 mph) (1990)
- Complement: 10 officers, 74 enlisted (1990)
- Sensors & processing systems: Radar: SPN-25 (1961); no sonar.
- Armament: WWII: 1 × 3 in (76 mm) caliber gun; 2 × twin 40 mm guns; 2 × 20 mm guns; 1990: 1 × 3"/50 caliber gun

USS Zuni (AT/ATF-95), a Cherokee-class fleet tugboat, formerly called Navajo class, was a ship of the United States Navy named for the Zuni, the popular name given to a tribe of Pueblo Indians indigenous to the area around the Zuni River in central New Mexico near the Arizona state line.

Zuni (AT-95) was laid down on 8 March 1943 at Portland, Oregon, by the Commercial Iron Works; launched on 31 July 1943; sponsored by Mrs. J. J. O'Donnell; and commissioned on 9 October 1943.

== 1943 ==
Zuni completed shakedown training late in October and on the 28th reported for duty with the Western Sea Frontier, The following day, she departed Puget Sound, bound for Kodiak, Alaska. On 10 November, she stood out of the harbor at Kodiak with two barges in tow. In extremely heavy weather during the voyage south, the towlines to both barges parted; and Zuni experienced great difficulty in keeping herself afloat. Though she managed to maintain contact with the second barge after it broke loose, she ultimately received orders to abandon it and make for Seattle, Washington.

On 1 December, the tug was reassigned to Service Squadron 2 (ServRon 2) and departed Seattle that same day with a barge in tow, bound for Oakland, California. After repairs at Oakland, the tug headed west for the New Hebrides on 27 December 1943, in company with four cargo ships, and arrived in Espiritu Santo at the end of January 1944.

== 1944 ==
Early in February, the tug left Espiritu Santo, set her course for Hawaii, and arrived in Pearl Harbor on 17 February. She performed routine missions at Oahu for about a month, getting underway on 21 March for a round-trip voyage to Canton Island. She returned to Oahu on 9 April towing two barges from Canton Island. On 20 April, she stood out of Pearl Harbor, pulling three barges bound for Majuro Atoll, and returned to Hawaii on 11 May. On 15 May 1944, she was redesignated a Fleet Ocean Tug, ATF-95.

A week later, she began an extended tour of duty in the Central Pacific. Towing the floating dry dock ARD-16, the tug arrived in Kwajalein lagoon on 2 June. Reassigned to ServRon 12, Zuni served as a harbor tug at Kwajalein until mid-July when she again took ARD-16 in tow and got underway for the Mariana Islands. There, she participated briefly in the 24 July assault on Tinian before settling into a routine of shuttle voyages between Eniwetok and the Marianas. Late in September, she towed a different floating dry dock, ARD-17, to the Palau Islands where, during the first 18 days of October, she provided support services to the combined forces invading Peleliu. At that point, she received urgent orders to rendezvous with Houston after that light cruiser had been damaged by two torpedoes during a Japanese aerial blitz to answer Task Force 38's raids on Okinawa and Formosa. She relieved Pawnee of the light cruiser and towed her into Ulithi lagoon on 27 October. After serving at the anchorage there for five days, the tug returned to sea with a group of oilers. Soon another set of urgent orders sent her to aid another light cruiser, Reno, which had been torpedoed in the Philippines, off the San Bernardino Strait, on 3 November by Japanese submarine I-41. Though the cruiser nearly capsized, the ships' companies of Zuni and Reno combined efforts to meet the threat; and the tug succeeded in towing the cruiser 1,500 miles (2,800 km) back to Ulithi.

The tug remained in Ulithi for the rest of November and throughout most of December. During the latter month, she towed the disabled merchantman SS John B. Floyd into Ulithi and conducted a solitary cruise eastward of the Philippines. On 29 December, Zuni put to sea with Task Group 30.8, the replenishment group for TF 38, and cruised for almost a month off Luzon. She returned to Ulithi on 28 January 1945 for engine repairs.

== 1945 ==
She moved back out to sea in February and arrived off Iwo Jima three days after the initial assault. For 31 days, she performed yeoman service for the warships in the area. She pulled a transport off a sand bar. She provided engine partial power to LST-944, which had lost one engine, as LST-944 made her run for the beach, and Zuni remained alongside LST-944 to assist the vessel to remain in position on the beach against the very high surf to land the US Army 506th 90 mm AAA Battalion, which was attached to the 3rd Marine Division. The use of a tug to help power an LST (Landing Ship, Tank) to the beach was a Navy first in amphibious landings. Her more routine missions consisted of assisting broached landing craft and laying submerged fuel pipes.

Work in the shallows, however, was as dangerous to her as to others. While attempting to save LST-727 on 23 March 1945, Zuni was stranded on Yellow Beach on Iwo Jima when a broken towline fouled her anchor and propeller. She lost two crewmen, Frederick Francis Palkovics, 18, of Elizabeth, N.J., and James Michael Byrnes, in the disaster, and suffered a broken keel and holed sides. She was pulled off the beach by Zebra and USS ATR-52, temporarily repaired, and towed to Saipan. After further temporary repairs, Zuni was towed to Pearl Harbor where she arrived at the end of May. During the more than 14 weeks of repairs she underwent there, World War II ended.

Zuni resumed active duty on 15 September and served with the Pacific Fleet until early in 1946, when she was transferred to the Atlantic Fleet. She served in the 8th Naval District until she was decommissioned on 29 June 1946 and transferred to the United States Coast Guard. Zuni was struck from the Naval Vessel Register on 19 July 1946.

Zuni earned four battle stars for her World War II service. Admiral William Halsey awarded the Legion of Merit to her skipper, Lt. Ray E. Chance. From the time of her commissioning Zuni was underway 80% of the time.

== USCGC Tamaroa ==
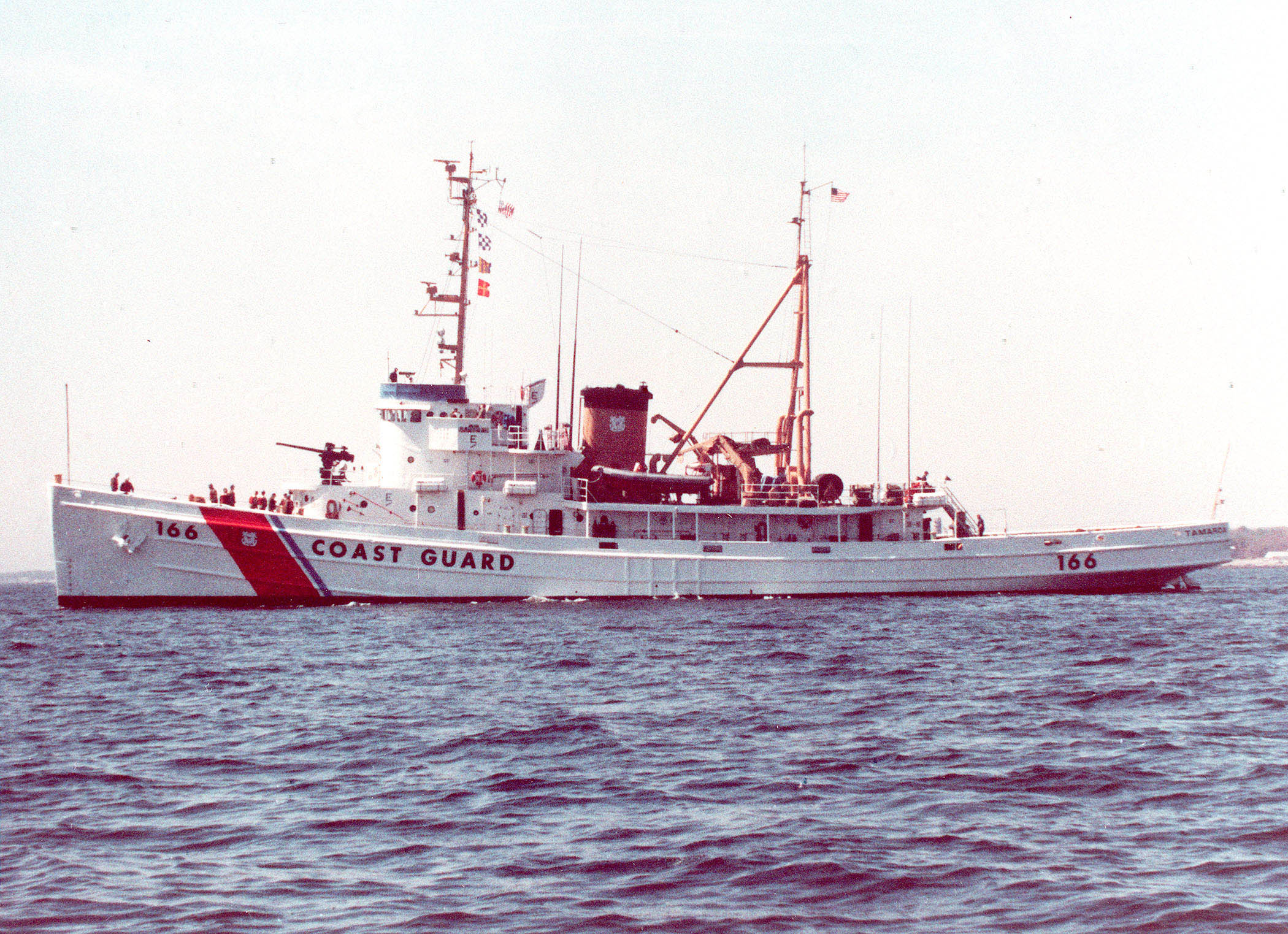
USCGC Tamaroa in May 1990

The ship was renamed USCGC Tamaroa (WAT-166), after the Tamaroa tribe of the Illiniwek tribal group. She was later reclassified a Medium Endurance Cutter, WMEC-166. As Tamaroa, she is best known for her rescue work during the "Perfect Storm" of 1991. She was decommissioned by the Coast Guard on 1 February 1994.

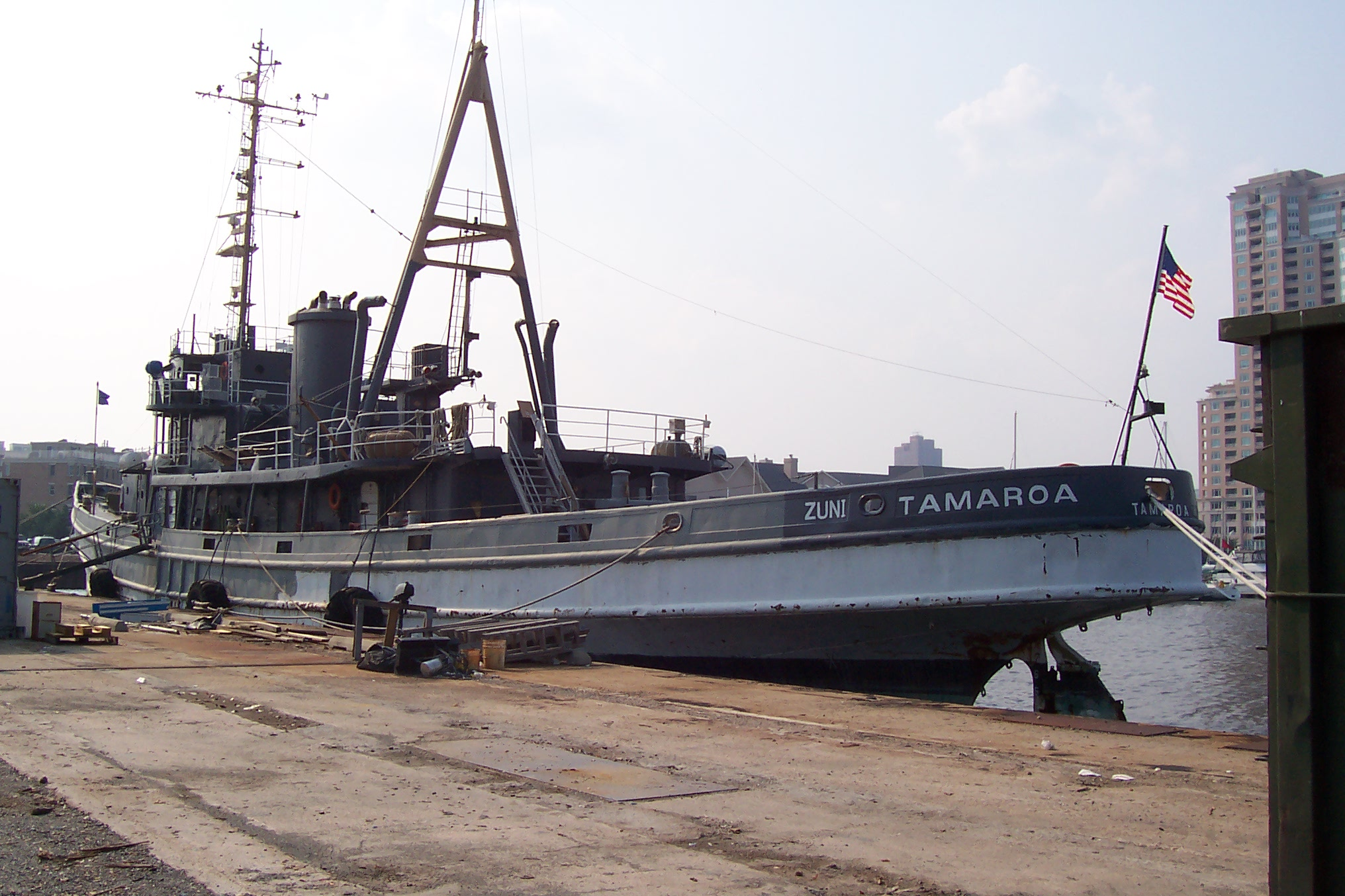
At Baltimore harbor, August 2007

From 2009 till 2011 Tamaroa had been undergoing restoration work at Little Creek in preparation to its move to its future home port in the City of Portsmouth. In 2011 she was moved to the Nauticus on the waterfront in downtown Norfolk where she remained for a brief stay. She was then moved to a private shipyard across the Elizabeth river where she awaits her final fate. In late 2011 or early 2012 she suffered a major leak during a storm. Her owner decided that it was no longer worth keeping and turned her over to the shipyard owner. The Zuni Maritime Foundation was able to remove the property that they had acquired to outfit the ship and has transferred to other museum ships.

== Scuttling and use as reef ==
Prior to scuttling, parts of the Tamaroa were removed by the Black Dog Salvage company for two episodes of the TV show "Salvage Dawgs". Her main mast was repurposed as a flagpole for the Ballast Point Brewing Company in Roanoke, Virginia. In 2017 the hull of the ship was scuttled off the coast of Cape May, New Jersey to add to an existing artificial reef. New Jersey and Delaware acquired the Tamaroa for $300,000, mostly raised through non-profit groups. It joins the Navy destroyer USS Arthur W. Radford 120 feet below the ocean's surface on the Del-Jersey-Land Reef, which is managed by Delaware, New Jersey and Maryland.
