= USS Chippewa (AT-69) =

Tugboat of the United States Navy

History

United States
- Name: USS Chippewa
- Builder: Charleston Shipbuilding and Drydock Company, Charleston, South Carolina
- Launched: 25 July 1942
- Commissioned: 14 February 1943
- Decommissioned: 26 February 1947
- Reclassified: ATF-69, 15 May 1944
- Stricken: 1 September 1961
- Fate: Sunk as an artificial reef; 8 February 1990

General characteristics
- Class & type: Navajo-class fleet tug
- Displacement: 1,235 long tons (1,255 t)
- Length: 205 ft (62 m)
- Beam: 38 ft 6 in (11.73 m)
- Draft: 15 ft 4 in (4.67 m)
- Propulsion: Diesel-electric; four General Motors 12-278A diesel main engines driving four General Electric generators and three General Motors 3-268A auxiliary services engines; single screw; 3,600 shp (2,685 kW)
- Speed: 16 knots (30 km/h; 18 mph)
- Complement: 85
- Armament: 1 × 3 in (76 mm) gun; 2 × twin 40 mm gun mounts; 2 × single 20 mm guns

USS Chippewa (AT-69) was a Navajo-class fleet tug constructed for the United States Navy during World War II. Her purpose was to aid ships, usually by towing, on the high seas or in combat or post-combat areas, plus "other duties as assigned." She served in the Atlantic Ocean.

Chippewa was laid down as AT-69, on 26 June 1942, by the Charleston Shipbuilding and Drydock Company, Charleston, South Carolina; launched on 25 July 1942; sponsored by Mrs. T. Horton; and commissioned on 14 February 1943.

== World War II Atlantic Ocean operations ==
Chippewa crossed the Atlantic from Norfolk to Casablanca to lay buoys there between 4 May 1943 and 9 June, returning to Boston 26 June. Two days later, she cleared for Norfolk and overhaul, and on 19 July began towing duty with a passage to Bermuda and Jacksonville. Assigned to duty in the Caribbean Sea Frontier, she made Trinidad, British West Indies, her principal base until 6 May 1944, when she returned to Norfolk for repairs. On 15 May she was reclassified ATF-69.

With repairs complete 11 June 1944, Chippewa returned to towing and salvage duty in the Caribbean out of Trinidad until 29 March 1945. After repairs at Norfolk, she was reassigned for duty based on Argentia, Newfoundland, between 19 May and 1 November. During this time, she made a long towing voyage to Houston, Tex. Chippewa made her last towing passage from Boston to Bermuda to Norfolk, where she arrived 28 December with SS War Bonnet in tow.

== Post-war decommissioning and Fate ==
In March 1946, Chippewa reported to the U.S. 16th Fleet for inactivation, decommissioning on 26 February 1947 and berthing at Orange, Texas. The diesel electric, single screw tug remained in the Reserve Fleet until transferred to the Maritime Administration and moved to the Beaumont NDRF on 15 November 1960. Chippewa was struck from the Naval Vessel Register on 1 September 1961. Chippewa remained in the Beaumont NDRF until 17 August 1989 when she was returned to the Navy to be prepared to be sunk as an artificial reef. Chippewa was sunk on 8 February 1990 by a network of 37 explosive charges, where she continues to serve the Panama City area as an artificial reef.
