= USS Seminole (AT-65) =

Tugboat of the United States Navy

Coordinates: 9°23′0″S 160°13′14″E

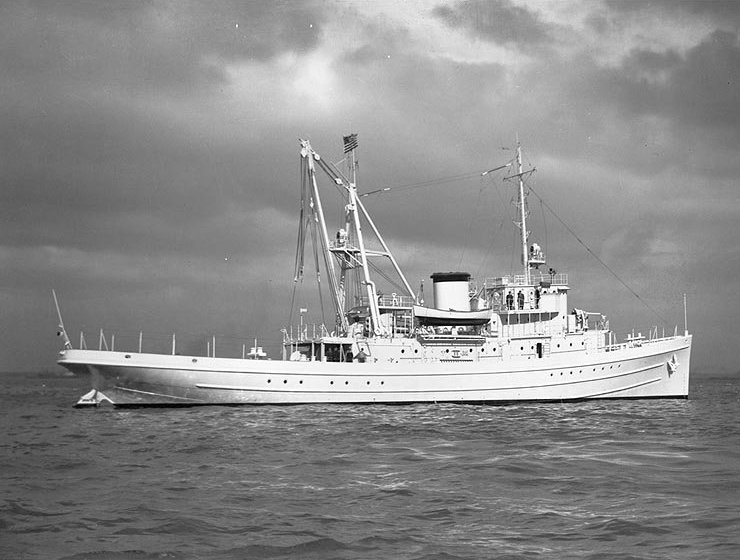

History

United States
- Name: USS Seminole
- Builder: Bethlehem Mariners Harbor, Staten Island, New York City
- Laid down: 16 December 1938
- Launched: 15 September 1939
- Commissioned: 8 March 1940
- Stricken: 2 December 1942
- Honors and awards: 1 battle star (World War II)
- Fate: Sunk during action off Tulagi, 25 October 1942

General characteristics
- Class & type: Navajo-class fleet tug
- Displacement: 1,500 long tons (1,524 t)
- Length: 205 ft (62 m)
- Beam: 38 ft 6 in (11.73 m)
- Draft: 15 ft 3 in (4.65 m)
- Speed: 16 knots (30 km/h; 18 mph)
- Complement: 80
- Armament: 1 × 3 in (76 mm) gun

USS Seminole (AT-65), the third ship named Seminole of the United States Navy, was a Navajo-class fleet tug whose task was to travel with the fleet and provide towing services as required.

Seminole was laid down on 16 December 1938 by the Bethlehem Shipbuilding Corporation, Staten Island, New York; launched on 15 September 1939; sponsored by Miss Grace Svenningsen, daughter of the Foreman Carpenter at the Staten Island Yard; and commissioned on 8 March 1940.

== East Coast operations ==
Following shakedown along the U.S. East Coast, Seminole steamed for San Diego, California, and towing operations along the U.S. West Coast, and around Hawaii, Wake Island, and to the Panama Canal.

== World War II Pacific Theater operations ==
On one such trip, Seminole departed Pearl Harbor en route to San Diego. At 1317 on 7 December 1941, however, the ocean-going tug sounded general quarters, reversed her course, and anchored at Pearl Harbor on the 12th.

With her sister ship, USS Navajo (AT-64), the Seminole operated in Pearl Harbor during the busy, hectic days following the Japanese attack. On 15 February 1942, however, Seminole embarked a salvage team and departed Pearl Harbor for Canton Island where, from 21 February to 24 March 1942, she assisted in unsuccessful salvage operations for the grounded Army transport ship, SS President Taylor, which was eventually abandoned on the coral reef (and removed in the 1950s). On 24 March 1942, she reembarked her divers; took the fleet tug Sonoma (AT-12) in tow; and steamed (under her diesel-electric power) for Pearl Harbor. Arriving on 31 March 1942, she remained in the harbor on channel escort duty until 31 May 1942, when she commenced salvage operations on patrol craft YP-108 off nearby Wahie Point, Lanai. Three days later Seminole returned to Pearl Harbor.

=== Sailing to the South Pacific ===
On 4 June 1942, the fleet ocean tug got underway from Pearl Harbor for Midway Island. Arriving on 10 June 1942, she took the crippled minesweeper/fleet tug Vireo (AM-52) in tow and delivered her to Pearl Harbor for emergency repairs on 17 June 1942. Repairs and further channel escort duty followed; then, on 15 August 1942, she got underway to Fiji.

Moving south and west, Seminole anchored in Suva Harbor, Fiji Islands on 26 August 1942; she continued on the next day to the Tonga Islands; anchored at Tongatapu on 29 August 1942; and commenced channel escort duty in Nukuʻalofa anchorage, Tongatapu. She continued her escort duties at Tongatapu until 8 October 1942.

=== Battle action at Tulagi ===
Seminole arrived off Tulagi on 18 October 1942, where she was assigned to ferry ammunition, gasoline, and troops. On the morning of 25 October 1942, Seminole and YP-284, a converted fishing vessel, were unloading aviation gasoline, howitzers, and U.S. Marines about three and one-half miles east of Lunga Point when three Japanese destroyers, Akatsuki, Ikazuchi and Shiratsuyu appeared to the northwest. The smaller vessels immediately got underway, heading eastward in hopes of avoiding the enemy fire. The Japanese destroyers, after breaking contact with two American destroyers, changed course and pursued the slower Seminole and YP-284. The first shells to hit Seminole did so at about 1115, and were followed by two more hitting salvos.

=== Abandon ship ===
On 25 October 1942, the order to abandon the burning, sinking ship was given at 1120, minutes after YP-284 went under. Seminole sank about 1,000 yards off-shore between Lengo and the point to the east. Since the majority of the enemy projectiles had passed through her thin-skinned sides without exploding, Seminole lost only one crew member in the action.

Seminole was struck from the Navy list five weeks later on 2 December 1942.

== Awards ==
Seminole received one battle star for World War II service.
