= USS Chickasaw (AT-83) =

Tugboat of the United States Navy

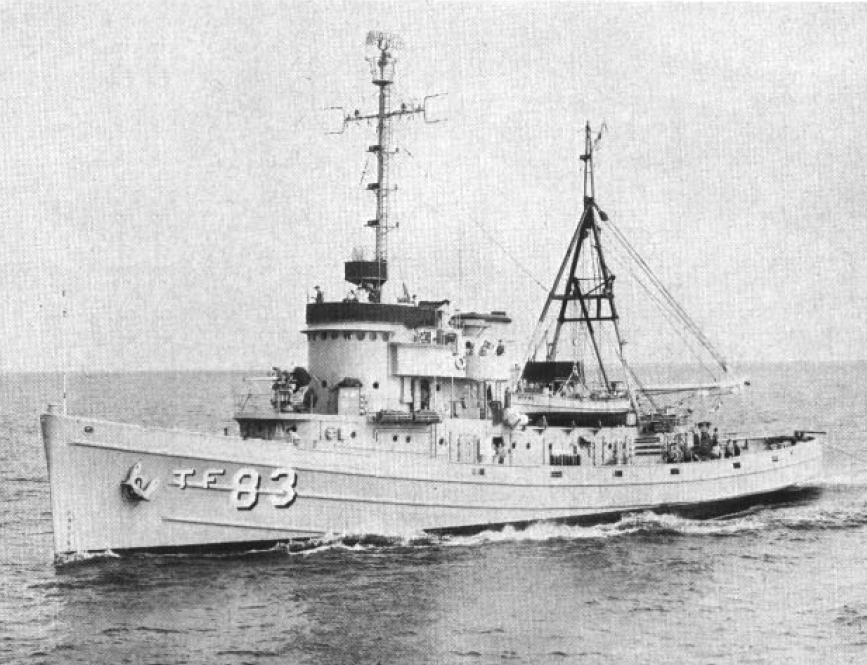

History

United States
- Name: USS Chickasaw (AT-83)
- Namesake: Chickasaw
- Builder: United Engineering Co., Ltd., Alameda, California
- Launched: 23 July 1942
- Commissioned: 4 February 1943
- Decommissioned: 30 June 1965
- Reclassified: ATF-83, 15 May 1944
- Stricken: 15 April 1976
- Honors and awards: 6 battle stars and Navy Unit Commendation (World War II); 2 battle stars (Korea)
- Fate: Sold to the Republic of China, 1 May 1976

History

Taiwan
- Name: ROCS Ta Tung (A-548)
- Acquired: 1 May 1976
- Decommissioned: 16 Jul 1999
- Fate: Sunk as an artificial reef on 10 November 2002

General characteristics
- Class & type: Navajo-class fleet tug
- Displacement: 1,235 long tons (1,255 t)
- Length: 205 ft (62 m)
- Beam: 38 ft 6 in (11.73 m)
- Draft: 15 ft 4 in (4.67 m)
- Propulsion: Diesel-electric; 4 × General Motors 12-278A diesel engines driving 4 General Electric generators; 3 × General Motors 3-268A auxiliary services engines; 1 screw; 3,600 shp (2,685 kW)
- Speed: 16 knots (30 km/h; 18 mph)
- Complement: 85 officers and enlisted
- Armament: 1 × single 3"/50 caliber gun; 2 × twin 40 mm AA guns; 2 × single 20 mm AA guns

USS Chickasaw (AT-83/ATF-83) was a Navajo-class fleet tug constructed for the United States Navy during World War II. She served in the Pacific Ocean in World War II and the Korean War, and was awarded six battle stars for World War II and two battle stars during the Korean War.

She was the third U.S. Navy vessel to be named Chickasaw, and was launched 23 July 1942 by United Engineering Co., Ltd., Alameda, California; sponsored by Mrs. R. Fairbanks; commissioned 4 February 1943 and reported to the Pacific Fleet.

== World War II Pacific Theatre operations ==
Chickasaw departed Seattle, Washington, 11 March 1943, for Pearl Harbor towing yard floating drydock YFD-21, and arrived on 30 March. Sailing on to Espiritu Santo, Chickasaw served as station tug until 27 June, when she stood out for Pearl Harbor. Arriving 6 July, she had salvage duty, towed targets, laid buoys, and made tows to Midway Island until 21 January 1944, when she sailed for the Marshalls.

== Supporting island invasions ==
Chickasaw supported the occupation of Kwajalein, Majuro, and Eniwetok until 19 March, when she cleared Kwajalein for Pearl Harbor, arriving 27 March. She sailed from Pearl Harbor on 11 May, was reclassified ATF-83 on 15 May, and arrived at Majuro on 24 May for training duty. Clearing the Marshalls on 11 June, Chickasaw arrived off Saipan on 16 June for tug duties, patrol, and salvage in support of the occupation of that island until 24 July. Similar duty found Chickasaw off Tinian from 24 July 1944. After continued salvage duty in the Marianas Chickasaw cleared Saipan on 18 September for Guam, Eniwetok, and Manus, arriving 4 October.

== Supporting the invasion of the Philippines ==
Six days later she sailed for the assault on Leyte, arriving in Leyte Gulf on 20 October. Here she conducted salvage and rescue operations through the landings, the fury of the Battle for Leyte Gulf, and the occupation, until 22 November when she sailed for replenishment and salvage duty at Manus. On 27 December she got underway for Lingayen Gulf, arriving 9 January 1945 for salvage operations during the assault. She remained at Lingayen, Subic Bay, and San Pedro Bay on similar duty until 4 March, when she cleared for overhaul and tug duties at Ulithi. From 9–22 June she next operated off Okinawa, then sailed for Pearl Harbor, where she arrived 24 July for yard overhaul.

== Post-war activity ==
Variously based at San Diego, California, Pearl Harbor, and in the Marianas between World War II and the Korean War, Chickasaw served the Fleet with towing, salvage, and other tug duty which took her throughout the Pacific.

== Korean War support ==
During the first year of the Korean War, she operated on the U.S. West Coast, to Pearl Harbor, and to Eniwetok and Kwajalein, and during the summer of 1951, sailed in Alaskan waters. After west coast operations, she cleared Pearl Harbor on 3 March 1953 for Sasebo, her base for direct support to forces engaged in the Korean War. Returning to San Diego, California, 17 October, she resumed an operating schedule which through 1960 included Alaskan operations in 1954-55 and 1957, and deployments to the Far East in 1957–58, 1959, and 1960.

== Decommissioning ==
After being decommissioned (date unknown) she was struck from the Naval Register on 15 April 1976. She was sold to the Republic of China under the Security Assistance Program, 1 May 1976, and renamed Ta Tung (A-548). She was decommissioned on July 16, 1999, and sunk as an artificial reef on November 10, 2002.

== Awards ==
Chickasaw received six battle stars for World War II service, and two for Korean War service.
