= Cherokee-class tugboat =

Class of armed tugboats

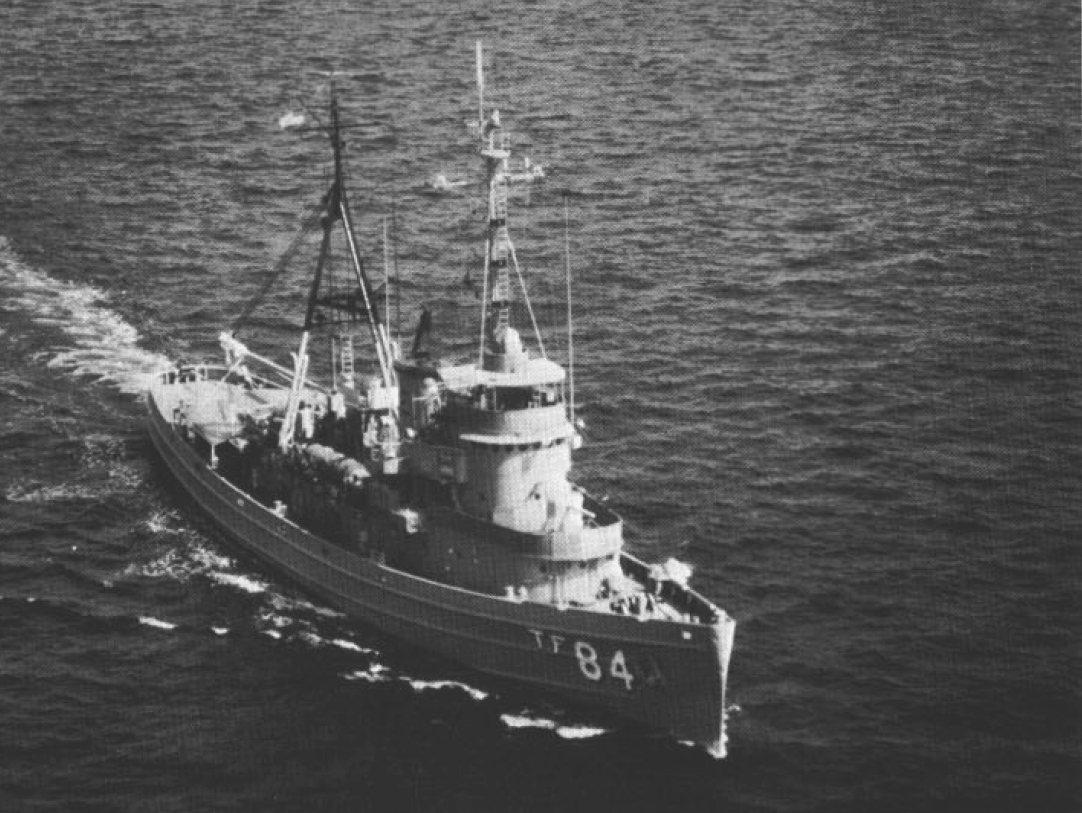
- USS Cree (ATF-84) underway in 1970

Class overview
- Builders: Charleston SB & DD, SC (9); United Engineering Co., CA (8); Cramp Shipbuilding, PA (5); Commercial Iron Works, OR (4); Bethlehem Staten Island, NY (3)
- Operators: United States Navy; United States Coast Guard; Argentine Navy; Chilean Navy; Colombian National Navy; Dominican Navy; Indonesian Navy; Pakistan Navy; Peruvian Navy; Republic of China Navy; Turkish Navy; Brazilian Navy
- Preceded by: Bagaduce class
- Succeeded by: Abnaki class
- Built: 1938–1943
- In service: 1940–1994 (US)
- Planned: 33
- Completed: 29
- Active: 2
- Lost: 2
- Retired: 25

General characteristics
- Type: Fleet tugboat
- Displacement: 1,235 long tons (1,255 t)
- Length: 205 ft (62 m)
- Beam: 38 ft 6 in (11.73 m)
- Draft: 18 ft (5.5 m)
- Propulsion: Diesel-electric, 1 shaft, 3,600 hp (2,685 kW)
- Speed: 16.5 knots (30.6 km/h; 19.0 mph)
- Complement: 85+
- Armament: 1 × 3"/50 caliber gun; 2 × twin 40 mm guns; 2 × 20 mm guns

The Cherokee class of fleet tugboats, originally known as the Navajo class, were built for the United States Navy prior to the start of World War II. They represented a radical departure from previous ocean-going tug designs, and were far more capable of extended open ocean travel than their predecessors. This was due in large part to their length of 205 feet (62 m), 38 feet (12 m) beam, and substantial fuel-carrying capacity. They were also the first large surface vessels in the United States Navy to be equipped with Diesel-electric drive.

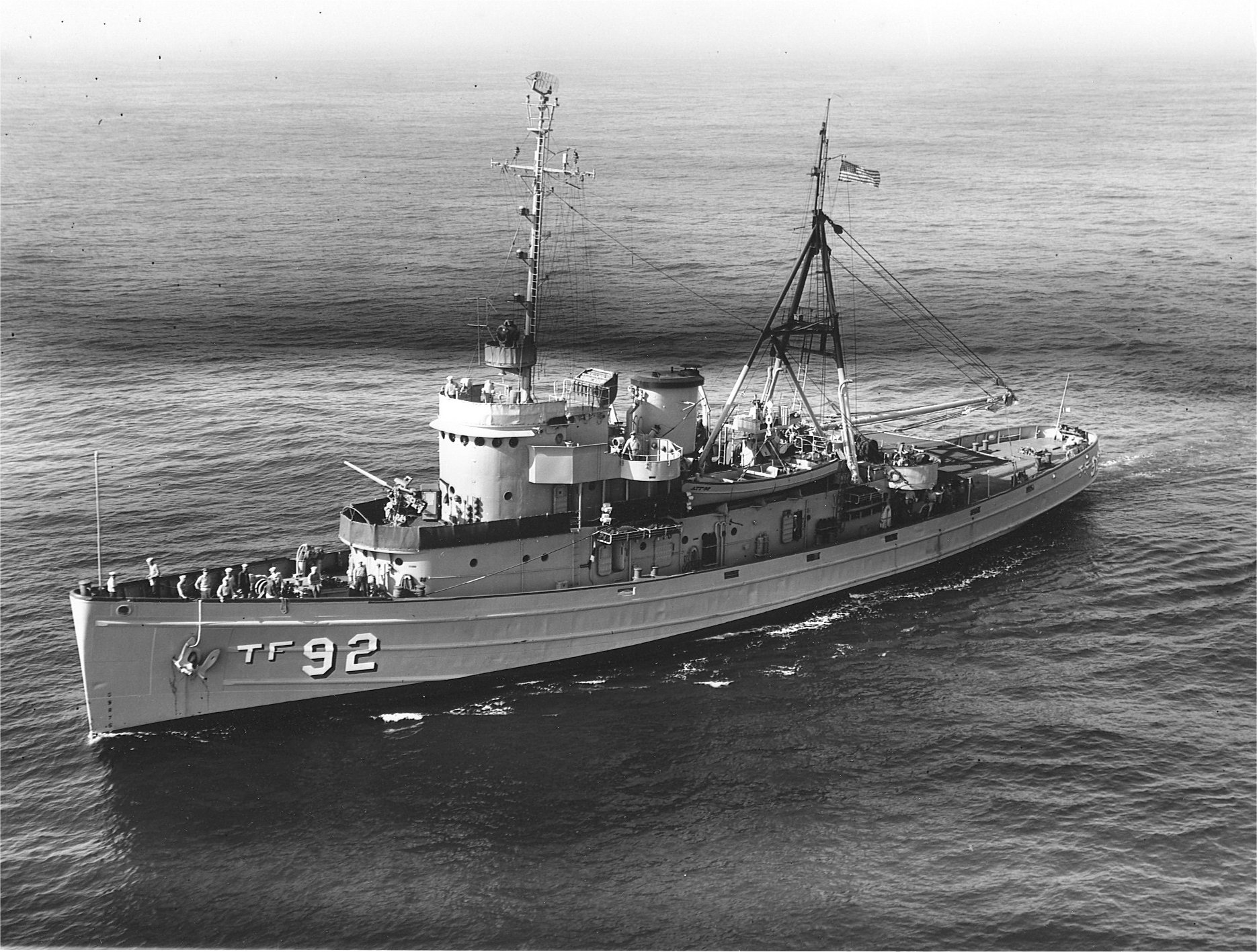
USS Tawasa towed a nuclear bomb used as a nuclear depth charge as it was detonated in Operation Wigwam in 1955

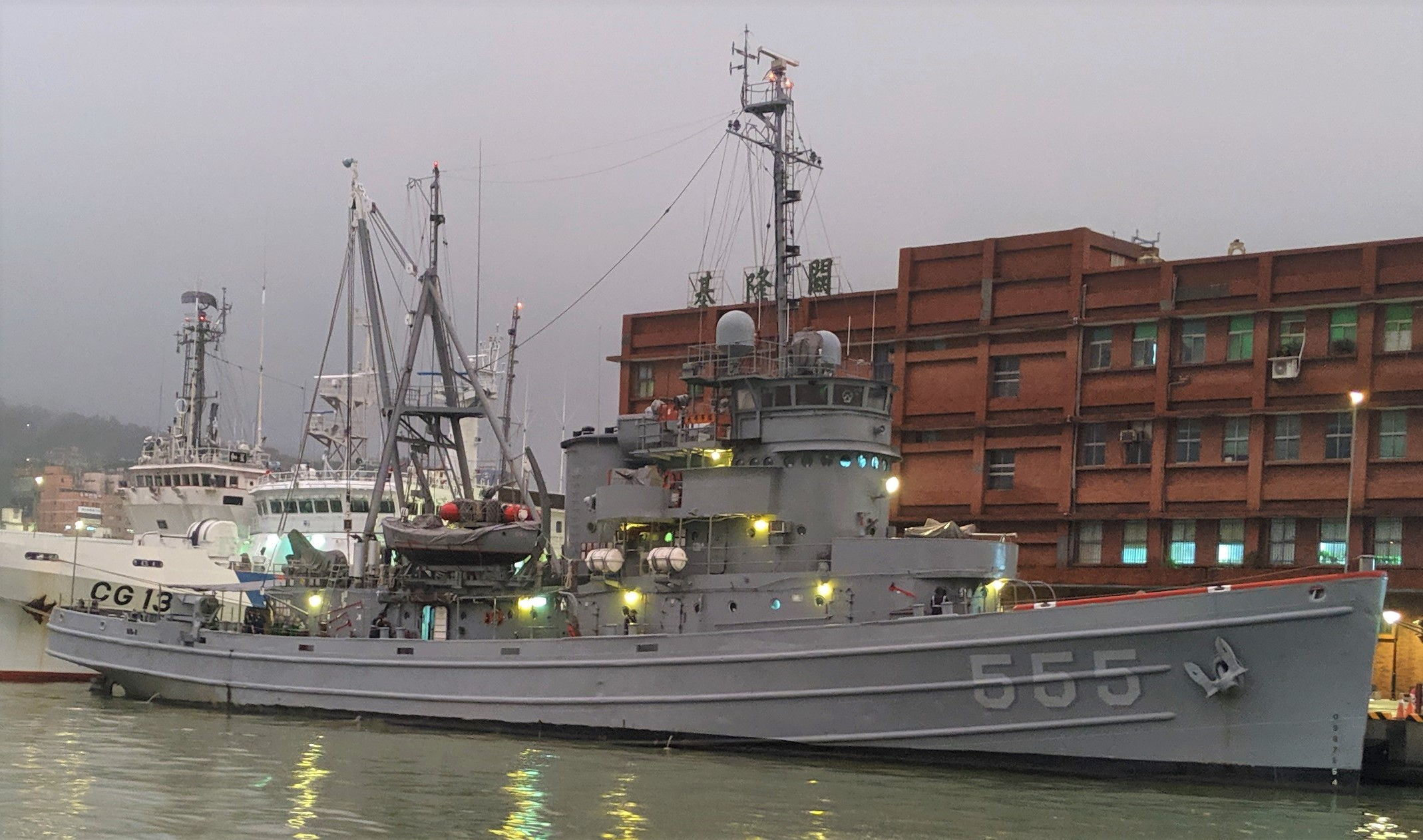
Ta Feng, ex-USS Narragansett at Keelung harbor, September 28, 2019

The first three vessels, Navajo, Seminole and Cherokee, were constructed from 1938 to 1940 at the Bethlehem Staten Island division of Bethlehem Steel. Navajo and Seminole joined the Pacific fleet in 1940, and Cherokee went to the Atlantic fleet. Navajo was en route to San Diego from Pearl Harbor on 7 December 1941, and immediately reversed course to Pearl Harbor once news broke of the Japanese attack. She became a critical element of salvage operations there, as did her sister ship Seminole, in the days following the attack.

Following the loss during World War II of the first two ships of the class, Navajo and Seminole, the class was renamed from its original pre-war name of Navajo class to Cherokee class, the name of the third ship laid in 1939, which still survived.

== Ships ==
Ship name	Hull	Builder	Comm.	Decomm.	Fate/status
Navajo	AT-64	Bethlehem Staten Island	26 Jan 1940	n/a	Sunk, 12 September 1943
Seminole	AT-65	Bethlehem Staten Island	8 Mar 1940	n/a	Sunk, 25 October 1942
Cherokee	AT-66	Bethlehem Staten Island	26 Apr 1940	29 Jun 1946	Transferred to United States Coast Guard; sunk as a target, 1992
Apache	AT-67	Charleston Shipbuilding and Drydock Company	12 Dec 1942	27 Feb 1974	Transferred to Taiwan, 1 June 1974; stranded in action 1985; after rebuild currently active (only the bridge and the mast are retrieved)
Arapaho	AT-68	Charleston Shipbuilding and Drydock Company	20 Jan 1943	15 Jan 1947	Transferred to Argentina, 1961; wrecked 10 January 1976
Chippewa	AT-69	Charleston Shipbuilding and Drydock Company	14 Feb 1943	26 Feb 1947	Sunk as an artificial reef, 8 February 1990
Choctaw	AT-70	Charleston Shipbuilding and Drydock Company	21 Apr 1943	11 Mar 1947	Transferred, to Colombia, 1 March 1978; fate unknown
Hopi	AT-71	Charleston Shipbuilding and Drydock Company	31 Mar 1943	9 Dec 1955	joined the Atlantic Reserve Fleet. turned over to the Maritime Administration 27 March 1962 and moved to the National Defense Reserve Fleet, James River, Va., where she remains, following permanent transfer to the Maritime Administration 1 July 1963, into 1967.
Kiowa	AT-72	Charleston Shipbuilding and Drydock Company	7 Jun 1943	n/a	Sold to Dominican Republic, 1972; sold for scrap, 12 December 1994
Menominee	AT-73	United Engineering Company	25 Sep 1942	15 Nov 1946	Transferred to Indonesia, 26 January 1961; sunk as a target in 2004
Pawnee	AT-74	United Engineering Company	7 Nov 1942	Jan 1947	Sold for scrap, 9 November 1971
Sioux	AT-75	United Engineering Company	6 Dec 1942	15 Aug 1973	Transferred to Turkey, 15 August 1973; decommissioned in 2017, sunk as target 2023
Ute	AT-76	United Engineering Company	13 Dec 1942	30 Aug 1974	Sunk as a target, 4 August 1991
	AT-77; AT-78; AT-79; AT-80	cancelled			
Bannock	AT-81	Charleston Shipbuilding and Drydock Company	28 Jun 1942	25 Nov 1955	Sold for scrap, late 1950s
Carib	AT-82	Charleston Shipbuilding and Drydock Company	24 Jul 1943	24 Jan 1947	Transferred to Colombia, 14 February 1978; sunk as a target, June 2007
Chickasaw	AT-83	United Engineering Company	4 Feb 1943	30 Jun 1965	Transferred to Taiwan, 1 May 1976; decommissioned, 16 Jul 1999
Cree	AT-84	United Engineering Company	28 Mar 1943	n/a	Sunk as a target, 27 August 1978
Lipan	AT-85	United Engineering Company	29 Apr 1943	31 Mar 1988	Sunk as a target, 22 January 1990
Mataco	AT-86	United Engineering Company	29 May 1943	1 Oct 1977	Sold for scrap, 1 April 1979
Moreno	AT-87	Cramp Shipbuilding	30 Nov 1942	18 Aug 1946	Sunk as a target, 6 October 1988
Narragansett	AT-88	Cramp Shipbuilding	15 Jan 1943	21 Dec 1946	Transferred to Taiwan, 20 June 1991; decommissioned, 1 October 2021
Nauset	AT-89	Cramp Shipbuilding	2 Mar 1943	n/a	Sunk, 9 September 1943
Pinto	AT-90	Cramp Shipbuilding	1 Apr 1943	11 Jul 1946	Transferred to Peru, 1 May 1974; active as of 2019
Seneca	AT-91	Cramp Shipbuilding	30 Apr 1943	Jul 1971	Sunk as a target, 21 July 2003
Tawasa	AT-92	Commercial Iron Works	17 Jul 1943	31 Mar 1975	Sold for scrap, 1 August 1976
Tekesta	AT-93	Commercial Iron Works	16 Aug 1943	14 Apr 1950	Transferred to Chile, May 1960; Sunk as a target, 5 July 1999
Yuma	AT-94	Commercial Iron Works	31 Aug 1943	11 Nov 1955	Transferred to Pakistan, 25 March 1959; decommissioned in 1993; fate unknown after.
Zuni	AT-95	Commercial Iron Works	9 Oct 1943	1 Feb 1994	Sunk as an artificial reef, 10 May 2017
Chilula*	AT-153	Charleston Shipbuilding and Drydock Company	5 Apr 1945	19 Jun 1991	Sunk as a target, 1997

(*)Note: The reason for the gap in numbering from AT-95 to AT-153 is unknown.

== See also ==
- Sotoyomo-class tugboat
- Type V ship – Tugs
- List of auxiliaries of the United States Navy
