= USS Bannock =

Tugboat of the United States Navy

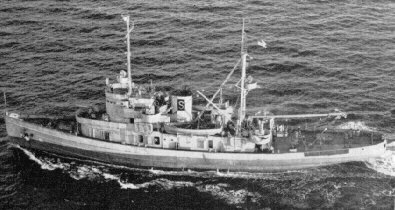
- Bannock in 1944

History

United States
- Name: USS Bannock
- Namesake: Bannock (tribe)
- Launched: 7 January 1943
- Commissioned: 28 June 1943
- Recommissioned: 11 September 1951
- Decommissioned: 25 November 1955
- Reclassified: Fleet Ocean Tug (ATF-81), 15 May 1944
- Honours and awards: two battle stars World War II
- Fate: Sold for scrap, late 1950s

General characteristics
- Class & type: Cherokee-class fleet tug
- Displacement: 1,646 tons
- Length: 205 ft (62 m)
- Beam: 38 ft 6 in (11.73 m)
- Draft: 15 ft 3 in (4.65 m)
- Propulsion: diesel-electric, four General Motors 12-278A main diesel engines driving four General Electric generators and three General Motors 3-268A auxiliary services engines, single screw, 3,600 shp (2,700 kW)
- Speed: 16 knots (30 km/h)
- Complement: 8 Officers, 68 Enlisted
- Armament: one single 3 in (76 mm)/50 gun mount, two twin 40 mm gun mounts, two single 20 mm guns

USS Bannock (AT-81/ATF-81) was an ocean-going tug launched 7 January 1943 by Charleston Shipbuilding and Dry Dock Co., Charleston, SC, sponsored by Mrs. Katherine Carswell, widow of Chief Petty Officer Carswell. She was commissioned 28 June 1943 and reported to the Atlantic Fleet. The ship was named for the Bannock Indian tribe in southern Idaho.

== Service history ==
Until April 1944 Bannock engaged in towing along the East Coast and in the Caribbean. On 19 April 1944 she arrived in England and, until June, towed ships and barges in preparation for the invasion of Europe. On 15 May 1944 her designation was changed to ATF-81.

Between 6 June and 21 July Bannock conducted salvage, repair, towing, and fire fighting operations on United States and British Navy ships during and subsequent to the invasion of Normandy. She returned to Boston 26 August 1944 and remained on the East Coast until December when she proceeded to the Pacific. Departing Pearl Harbor 9 February 1945 Bannock sailed to the Western Pacific where, between 6 May and 30 June 1945, she participated in the assault and occupation of Okinawa.

Bannock continued to operate throughout the Western Pacific until 22 January 1946. In the early months of 1946 she worked her way eastward across the Pacific, arriving at San Diego in May. Following pre-inactivation overhaul, she was placed out of commission in reserve 21 February 1947 at Orange, TX.

Bannock was recommissioned 11 September 1951 and reported to the Atlantic Fleet. Between September 1951 and November 1955 she had general and target towing duty along the Eastern Seaboard. She once again went out of commission in reserve 25 November 1955.

Bannock was disposed of through the Security Assistance Program (SAP) on 1 May 1979 to the Italian Coast Guard for service as the oceanographic research ship C.P. 451 Bannock.

Bannock received two battle stars for her service during World War II.
