= USS Pinto =

Tugboat of the United States Navy

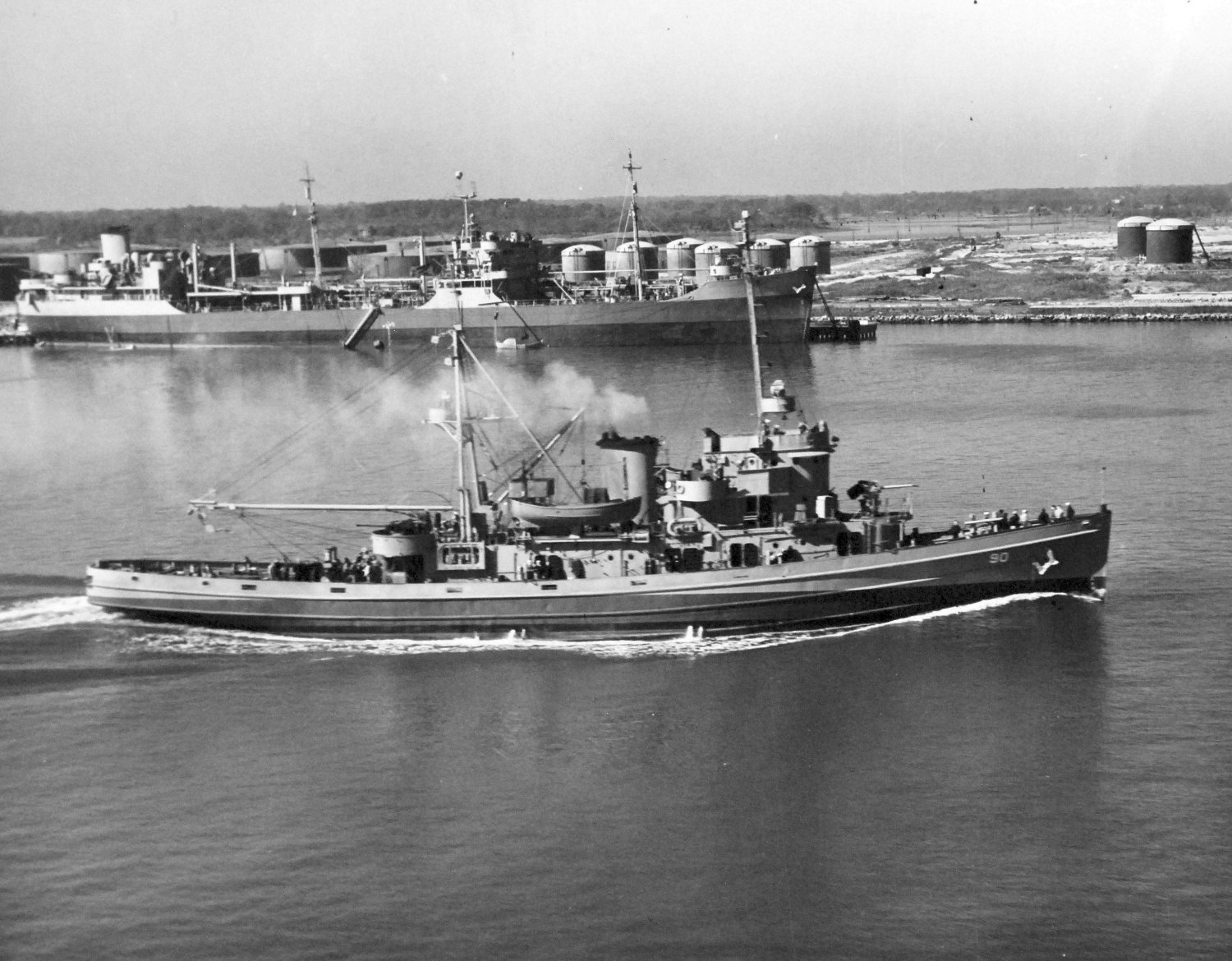

History

United States
- Name: USS Pinto
- Builder: Cramp Shipbuilding Co., Philadelphia
- Yard number: 545
- Laid down: 10 August 1942
- Launched: 5 January 1943
- Commissioned: 1 April 1943
- Decommissioned: 11 July 1946
- Reclassified: ATF-90, 15 May 1944
- Stricken: 17 May 1974
- Identification: AT-90
- Honors and awards: 3 battle stars & Navy Unit Commendation (World War II)
- Fate: Sold to Peru, 1 May 1974

Peru
- Name: BAP Guardian Rios
- Acquired: 1 May 1974
- Identification: ARB-123
- Status: In service

General characteristics
- Class & type: Navajo-class fleet tug
- Displacement: 1,235 long tons (1,255 t) light; 1,674 long tons (1,701 t) full
- Length: 205 ft (62 m)
- Beam: 38 ft 6 in (11.73 m)
- Draft: 15 ft 4 in (4.67 m)
- Propulsion: Diesel-electric; four General Motors 12-278A diesel main engines driving four General Electric generators and three General Motors 3-268A auxiliary services engines; single screw; 3,600 shp (2,685 kW)
- Speed: 16.5 knots (30.6 km/h; 19.0 mph)
- Complement: 85
- Armament: 1 × 3 in (76 mm) gun; 2 × twin 40 mm gun mounts; 2 × single 20 mm guns

USS Pinto (AT-90) was a Navajo-class fleet tug constructed for the United States Navy during World War II. Her purpose was to aid ships, usually by towing, on the high seas or in combat or post-combat areas, plus "other duties as assigned." She served in the Atlantic Ocean and, at war's end, returned home with three battle stars to her credit.

Pinto was laid down by the Cramp Shipbuilding Co. of Philadelphia 10 August 1942; launched 5 January 1943; sponsored by Miss Lorna Cook; and commissioned 1 April 1943.

== World War II Atlantic Ocean operations ==
Following shakedown, Pinto served in Service Squadron 1, Service Force, Atlantic Fleet operating on the U.S. East Coast of the United States and at Argentia, Newfoundland until 15 December 1943 when she arrived Long Island Sound to conduct salvage and towing operations for the U.S. Army and Navy Proving Grounds, Davisville, Rhode Island.

== Normandy Invasion operations ==
On 26 March 1944, Pinto was underway for the European theater of operations, arriving at Falmouth, England on 19 April. She was redesignated ATF-90 on 15 May. She arrived off the Normandy invasion coast on 6 June, where she and two other tugs comprised Combat Salvage Unit 122.3.1, which assisted and made emergency repairs to invasion landing craft while under enemy fire. On "D-Day" plus one (7 June 1944), USS Susan B. Anthony, an ocean liner serving as a troopship, struck a mine and was left burning and sinking; Pinto aided in rescuing 2,200 Army troops plus the Navy crew, finally having to axe the lines connecting her to the troopship as the tug was being pulled down. She was awarded the Navy Unit Commendation for her action, which holds the Guinness world record for most people saved with no deaths. Pinto remained on station as a combat salvage vessel off "Omaha Beach" until 3 July, when she returned to England.

== Invasion of Southern France operations ==
She arrived at Oran, Algeria, on 21 July, and joined the assault Force for "Operation Dragoon". On 15 August she arrived off the coast of southern France with task unit TU 85.14.7 and conducted salvage operations under enemy fire until 28 August when she returned to Oran and then the United States.

== Transferred to the Pacific Fleet ==
On 10 November Pinto, with a floating drydock section in tow, got underway for Panama, whence she proceeded across the Pacific to Bora Bora, Society Islands to join the 7th Fleet. Until June 1945 Pinto engaged in towing and salvage operations off New Guinea, the Admiralties, the Philippines and Morotai. On 4 June, Pinto departed Morotai as part of task group TG 76.20 for the amphibious assault on Brunei Bay, British North Borneo. She remained as salvage tug on station in Victoria Harbour until 2 July when she returned to the Philippine Islands for towing assignments.

During autumn Pinto conducted salvage and towing operations between Morotai, Balikpapan, Tarakan and Leyte Gulf. Then in December she got underway for the United States and inactivation.

== Decommissioning ==
On 11 July 1946 Pinto was decommissioned and entered the Atlantic Reserve Fleet, berthed at Orange, Texas. She was transferred, 1 May 1974, cash sale, under the Security Assistance Program, to Peru, and renamed BAP Guardian Rios (ARB-123).

== Awards ==
Pinto received the Navy Unit Commendation and also three battle stars for World War II service:

- Invasion of Normandy, 6 June to 3 July 1944
- Invasion of Southern France, 15 to 28 August 1944
- Borneo operation, Brunei Bay operation, 4 June to 5 July 1945
