= USS Pawnee (ATF-74) =

Tugboat of the United States Navy

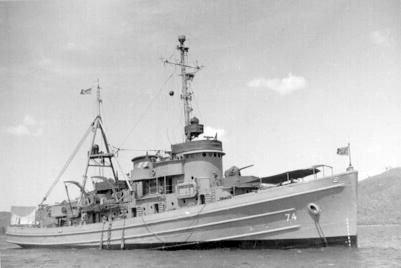
- USS Pawnee (ATF-74)

History

United States
- Name: USS Pawnee
- Builder: United Engineering Company, Alameda, California
- Laid down: 23 October 1941
- Launched: 31 March 1942
- Commissioned: 7 November 1942
- Decommissioned: January 1947
- Reclassified: ATF–74, 15 May 1944
- Stricken: 1 September 1962
- Fate: Disposed of by scrapping; 9 November 1971

General characteristics
- Class & type: Navajo-class fleet tug
- Displacement: 1,675 long tons (1,702 t)
- Length: 205 ft (62 m)
- Beam: 38 ft 6 in (11.73 m)
- Draft: 15 ft 4 in (4.67 m)
- Speed: 16.5 knots (30.6 km/h; 19.0 mph)
- Complement: 85 officers and enlisted
- Armament: 1 × 3 in (76 mm) gun; 2 × 40 mm guns

USS Pawnee (AT-74/ATF-74) was a Navajo-class fleet tug in the United States Navy.

Pawnee was laid down on 23 October 1941 by the United Engineering Company, Alameda, California; launched on 31 March 1942 and commissioned on 7 November 1942.

== Service history ==
After a Pacific coast Shakedown cruise Pawnee was assigned to Service Force, Pacific. In December 1942, she steamed for Pearl Harbor and commenced towing operations. She stood out of Pearl Harbor in early January, steamed for the forward Pacific area with the floating drydock USS ARD–5 in tow, and reported to ComSoPac for duty the 29th at Espiritu Santo.

Pawnee operated in the Solomons from June through August 1943, providing towing services at New Georgia and Rendova. She next provided services at Vella Lavella until October. Other operations took her to the Western Carolines, Okinawa, Leyte, and Luzon. She was reclassified as ATF–74 on 15 May 1944.

On 14 October 1944, off the coast of Formosa, the Cleveland-class light cruiser USS Houston was hit by a torpedo amidships and taken under tow by Pawnee. Two days later, with the damaged cruiser still attached by a tow line, another wave of Japanese torpedo bombers attacked Houston hitting her in the stern with a second torpedo. Damage was controlled and Pawnee with Houston reached Ulithi on 27 October.

She served with the Naval Occupation Forces in the Philippines from 28 September 1945 until 24 February 1946, when she sailed to Pearl Harbor. In January 1947 she decommissioned and entered the Columbia River Group of the Pacific Reserve Fleet. Pawnee was struck from the Navy List on 1 September 1962 and placed in the National Defense Reserve Fleet, Olympia, Washington, where she remained until 1971.

Pawnee was sold on 9 November 1971 to Hatch and Kirk, Inc of Seattle, WA for $31,850 and was broken up the next year.

== Suggested Reading ==
- Mason, Theodore C. (1996). We Will Stand By You: Serving in the Pawnee, 1942-1945. Naval Institute Press. ISBN 1-55750-581-0. A personal account of a radioman who served aboard the Pawnee from her commissioning until 1945.
