= USS Houston (CL-81) =

Light cruiser of the United States Navy

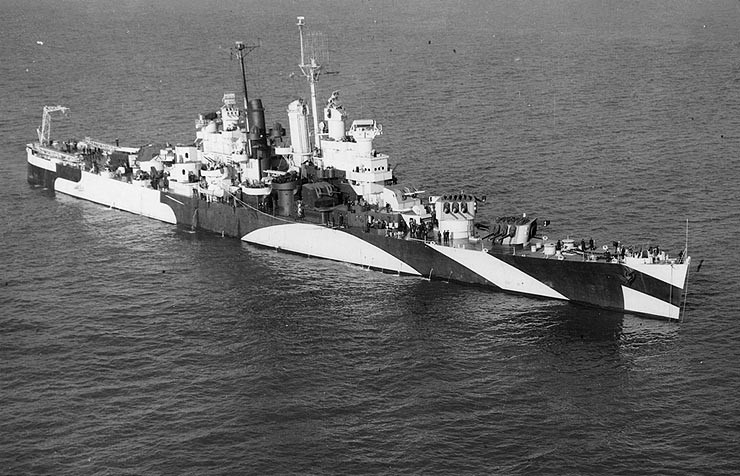
- USS Houston (January 1944)

History

United States
- Namesake: City of Houston, Texas
- Builder: Newport News Shipbuilding & Dry Dock Company, Newport News, Virginia
- Launched: 19 June 1943
- Commissioned: 20 December 1943
- Decommissioned: 15 December 1947
- Stricken: 1 March 1959
- Fate: Sold for scrap on 1 June 1961

General characteristics
- Class & type: Cleveland-class light cruiser
- Displacement: Standard: 11,744 long tons (11,932 t); Full load: 14,131 long tons (14,358 t)
- Length: 610 ft 1 in (185.95 m)
- Beam: 66 ft 4 in (20.22 m)
- Draft: 24 ft 6 in (7.47 m)
- Installed power: 4 × Babcock & Wilcox boilers; 100,000 shp (75,000 kW)
- Propulsion: 4 × steam turbines; 4 × screw propellers
- Speed: 32.5 knots (60.2 km/h; 37.4 mph)
- Range: 11,000 nmi (20,000 km; 13,000 mi) at 15 kn (28 km/h; 17 mph)
- Complement: 1,285 officers and enlisted
- Armament: 12 × 6 in (152 mm) Mark 16 guns; 12 × 5 in (127 mm)/38 caliber guns; 24 × 40 mm (1.6 in) Bofors anti-aircraft guns; 21 × 20 mm (0.79 in) Oerlikon anti-aircraft guns
- Armor: Belt: 3.5–5 in (89–127 mm); Deck: 2 in (51 mm); Barbettes: 6 in (152 mm); Turrets: 6 in (152 mm); Conning Tower: 5 in (127 mm)
- Aircraft carried: 4 × floatplanes
- Aviation facilities: 2 × stern catapults

USS Houston (hull number: CL-81) was a Cleveland-class light cruiser of the United States Navy, which were built during World War II. The class was designed as a development of the earlier Brooklyn-class cruisers, the size of which had been limited by the First London Naval Treaty. The start of the war led to the dissolution of the treaty system, but the dramatic need for new vessels precluded a new design, so the Clevelands used the same hull as their predecessors, but were significantly heavier. The Clevelands carried a main battery of twelve 6-inch (152 mm) guns in four three-gun turrets, along with a secondary armament of twelve 5 in (127 mm) dual-purpose guns. They had a top speed of 32.5 knots (60.2 km/h; 37.4 mph).

She was active in the Pacific War and survived two separate aerial torpedo hits in October 1944.

== Design ==
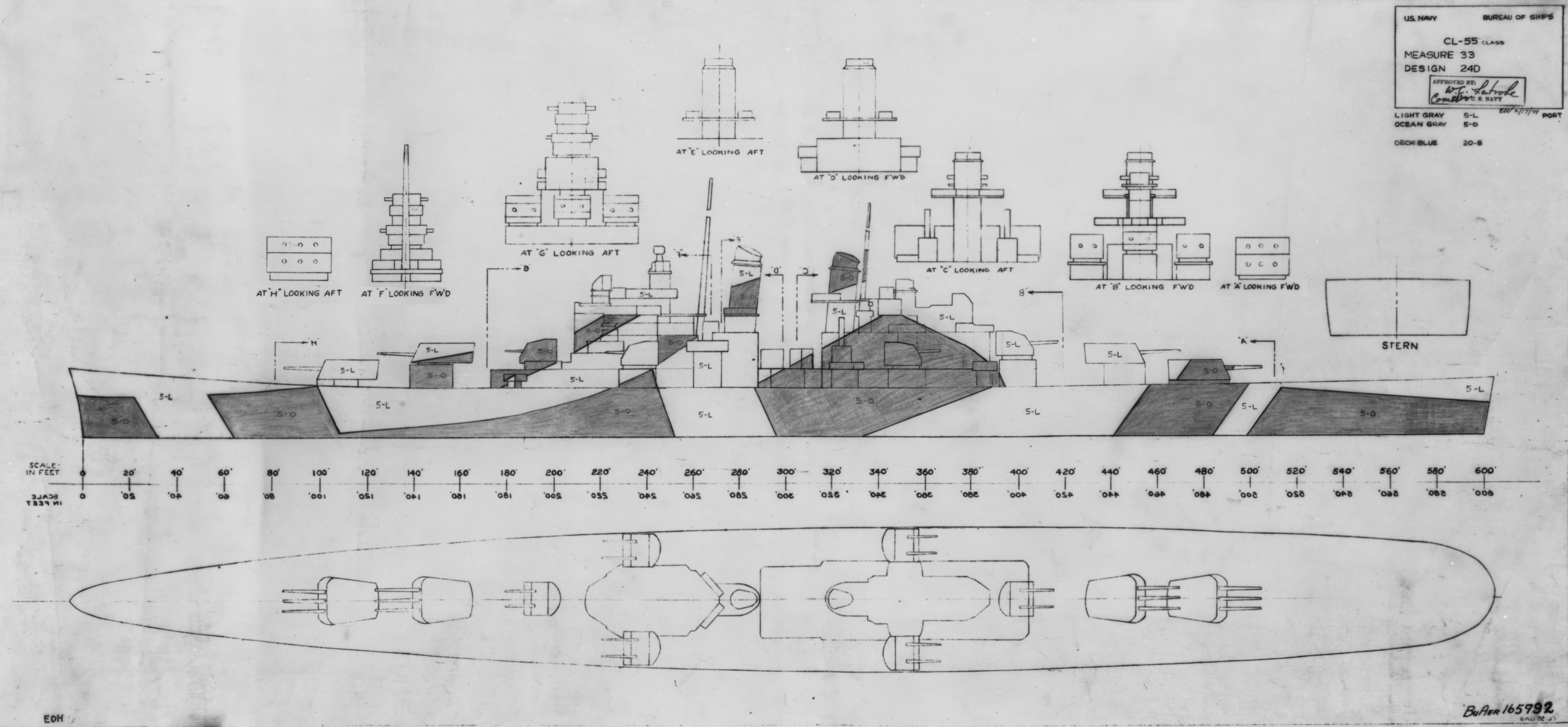
Depiction of the Cleveland class, showing the plan and profile

The Cleveland-class light cruisers traced their origin to design work done in the late 1930s; at the time, light cruiser displacement was limited to 8,000 long tons (8,100 t) by the Second London Naval Treaty. Following the start of World War II in September 1939, Britain announced it would suspend the treaty for the duration of the conflict, a decision the US Navy quickly followed. Though still neutral, the United States recognized that war was likely and the urgent need for additional ships ruled out an entirely new design, so the Clevelands were a close development of the earlier Brooklyn-class cruisers, the chief difference being the substitution of a two-gun 5 in (127 mm) dual-purpose gun mount for one of the main battery 6 in (152 mm) gun turrets.

Houston was 610 feet 1 inch (186 m) long overall and had a beam of 66 ft 4 in (20.22 m) and a draft of 24 ft 6 in (7.47 m). Her standard displacement amounted to 11,744 long tons (11,932 t) and increased to 14,131 long tons (14,358 t) at full load. The ship was powered by four General Electric steam turbines, each driving one propeller shaft, using steam provided by four oil-fired Babcock & Wilcox boilers. Rated at 100,000 shaft horsepower (75,000 kW), the turbines were intended to give a top speed of 32.5 knots (60.2 km/h; 37.4 mph). Her crew numbered 1285 officers and enlisted men.

The ship was armed with a main battery of twelve 6 in /47-caliber Mark 16 guns (Note: /47 refers to the length of the gun in terms of calibers. A /47 gun is 47 times long as it is in bore diameter.) in four 3-gun turrets on the centerline. Two were placed forward in a superfiring pair; the other two turrets were placed aft of the superstructure in another superfiring pair. The secondary battery consisted of twelve 5 in (127 mm) /38-caliber dual-purpose guns mounted in twin turrets. Two of these were placed on the centerline, one directly behind the forward main turrets and the other just forward of the aft turrets. Two more were placed abreast of the conning tower and the other pair on either side of the aft superstructure. Anti-aircraft defense consisted of twenty-four Bofors 40 mm (1.6 in) guns in four quadruple and four double mounts and twenty-one Oerlikon 20 mm (0.79 in) guns in single mounts.

The ship's belt armor ranged in thickness from 3.5 to 5 in (89 to 127 mm), with the thicker section amidships where it protected the ammunition magazines and propulsion machinery spaces. Her deck armor was 2 in (51 mm) thick. The main battery turrets were protected with 6.5 in (170 mm) faces and 3 in (76 mm) sides and tops, and they were supported by barbettes 6 inches thick. Houston's conning tower had 5-inch sides.

== Service history ==
Houston was laid down at the Newport News Shipbuilding & Dry Dock Company at Newport News, Virginia on 4 August 1941, originally under the name Vicksburg. On 12 October 1942, she was renamed Houston; some five months before, on 30 May, 1,000 Navy recruits, known as the Houston Volunteers, were sworn in at a dedication ceremony in downtown Houston but with a nineteen-month period between then and commissioning, only one served aboard the new Houston. The completed hull was launched on 19 June 1943. Fitting-out work was completed by December that year, and she was commissioned on the 20th. The ship got underway on 1 February 1944 to begin her shakedown cruise. She initially sailed to the Caribbean Sea, and then returned north for initial training off Boston. On 16 April, she left for the Pacific Ocean to join the war effort there. She passed through the Panama Canal and sailed north to San Diego, before continuing on to Pearl Harbor. She arrived there on 6 May and carried out further training exercises for the next few weeks.

=== World War II operations ===
Houston departed from Hawaii later in May and arrived in Majuro Atoll on the 31st, where she joined the anti-aircraft screen for the aircraft carriers of the Fast Carrier Task Force, then part of the Fifth Fleet. There, she was assigned to Task Group (TG) 58.4, which was centered on the aircraft carrier Essex and the light carriers Langley and Cowpens. She and the rest of the fleet then began the invasion of the Mariana and Palau Islands. The fleet got underway on 5 June and began air strikes on the islands on 12 June to prepare for the amphibious invasion, which started with the invasion of Saipan on 15 June. For their part, the Japanese launched their counter-attack with the recently formed 1st Mobile Fleet. In the resulting Battle of the Philippine Sea on 19 June, Houston contributed her anti-aircraft guns to the fleet's defense. After American air strikes on the 1st Mobile Fleet sank two of the Japanese carriers, the Japanese withdrew, allowing the American fleet to return to operations in support of the Marianas campaign. On 26 June, Houston joined the shore bombardment unit that targeted Guam and Rota. During the bombardment, she destroyed ten aircraft, the airstrip they occupied, and a radar installation. Houston thereafter sailed for Eniwetok to replenish ammunition for the next operation.

By this time, the Fast Carrier Task Force had passed to the command of the Third Fleet, and all of the units were renumbered. Houston was transferred to TG 38.2, which included the carriers Bunker Hill, Intrepid, and Hancock, the light carriers Independence and Cabot, and the fast battleships Iowa and New Jersey. The task force departed on 30 August to begin air strikes on the Palau Islands to prepare for the upcoming invasion of Peleliu. The carriers struck the islands on 6 September, after which Houston and several destroyers bombarded Peleliu and other islands in the area. The Fast Carrier Task Force then sailed west to neutralize Japanese airfields in the Philippines before returning for another series of attacks on Peleliu from 17 to 19 September to support American ground forces that had landed on the island on the 15th. The fleet then departed for Ulithi atoll to prepare for the next offensive, arriving there on 1 October. There, the fleet was reorganized again, and Houston was assigned to TG 38.1, which included the carriers Hornet and Wasp and the light carriers Cowpens and Monterey.

==== Formosa raid and torpedoing ====
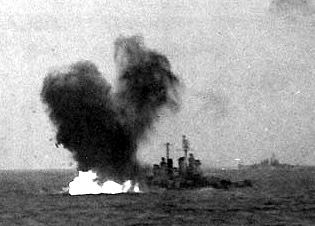
Second torpedo strike on Houston

On 6 October, the Fast Carrier Task Force sortied to carry out a series of air strikes on Japanese targets in the western Pacific. These began with attacks on Okinawa on 10 October, followed by attacks on Formosa two days later. The Formosa Air Battle lasted for three days, and American forces inflicted serious damage to the Japanese 2nd Air Fleet based on the island. Houston's anti-aircraft gunners claimed four aircraft shot down on 12 October, and three more on 14 October. During the latter engagement late in the day, a Japanese torpedo bomber hit Houston with a torpedo in one of her engine rooms. The hole flooded all four machinery spaces, which disabled power aboard the ship. The torpedo hit from the starboard side while Houston was turning right at a speed of 25 knots (46 km/h; 29 mph), so her hull was listing to port; as a result, the torpedo hit on the bottom of the hull. The ship's damage control teams began work immediately and began efforts to control flooding; eventually, they were able to contain flooding and pump some undamaged compartments empty.

The heavy cruiser Boston took Houston under tow to evacuate the crippled vessel, though the tugboat Pawnee had taken over the towline later that night. As the ship could no longer feed or house her crew due to the damage, most of the men were evacuated save the captain and damage control teams. She and the heavy cruiser Canberra, which had also been disabled by a torpedo hit, came under heavy attack from the 2nd Air Fleet on 16 October, and Houston was struck by a second torpedo in the stern, directly above her rudder. The explosion ignited the starboard tank that held fuel for the ship's reconnaissance floatplanes, causing a major fire in the aircraft hangar, though the remaining crew suppressed the blaze within fifteen minutes. Flooding from this hit degraded the ship's buoyancy and stability further. Another 300 men were evacuated afterward, leaving just 200 aboard to continue damage control efforts as the ships withdrew.

The Japanese believed the withdrawing formation might be intercepted, and sortied from the Inland Sea in an attempt to sink them, but an American air attack forced them to withdraw. Houston and Canberra had arrived back at Ulithi by 27 October; there, Houston underwent temporary repairs with assistance from the repair ship Hector. There were no floating dry docks large enough to accommodate Houston, but significant hull repairs were nevertheless effected and much of the flooding was pumped out. This work allowed her to steam to Manus Island for further work, arriving there on 20 December. There, the floating dry dock ABSD-2 took the cruiser aboard, allowing the rest of the hull damage to be plated over and the remaining water pumped out. Two of her boilers were also restored to operation, along with the No. 2 and 3 engines, allowing her to get underway in February. From there, she sailed to the New York Navy Yard for permanent repairs, which she reached on 24 March 1945. Work lasted until 11 October, by which time the war had ended with the surrender of Japan. In the course of the ship's wartime service, Houston received three battle stars.

Evacuation and repairs

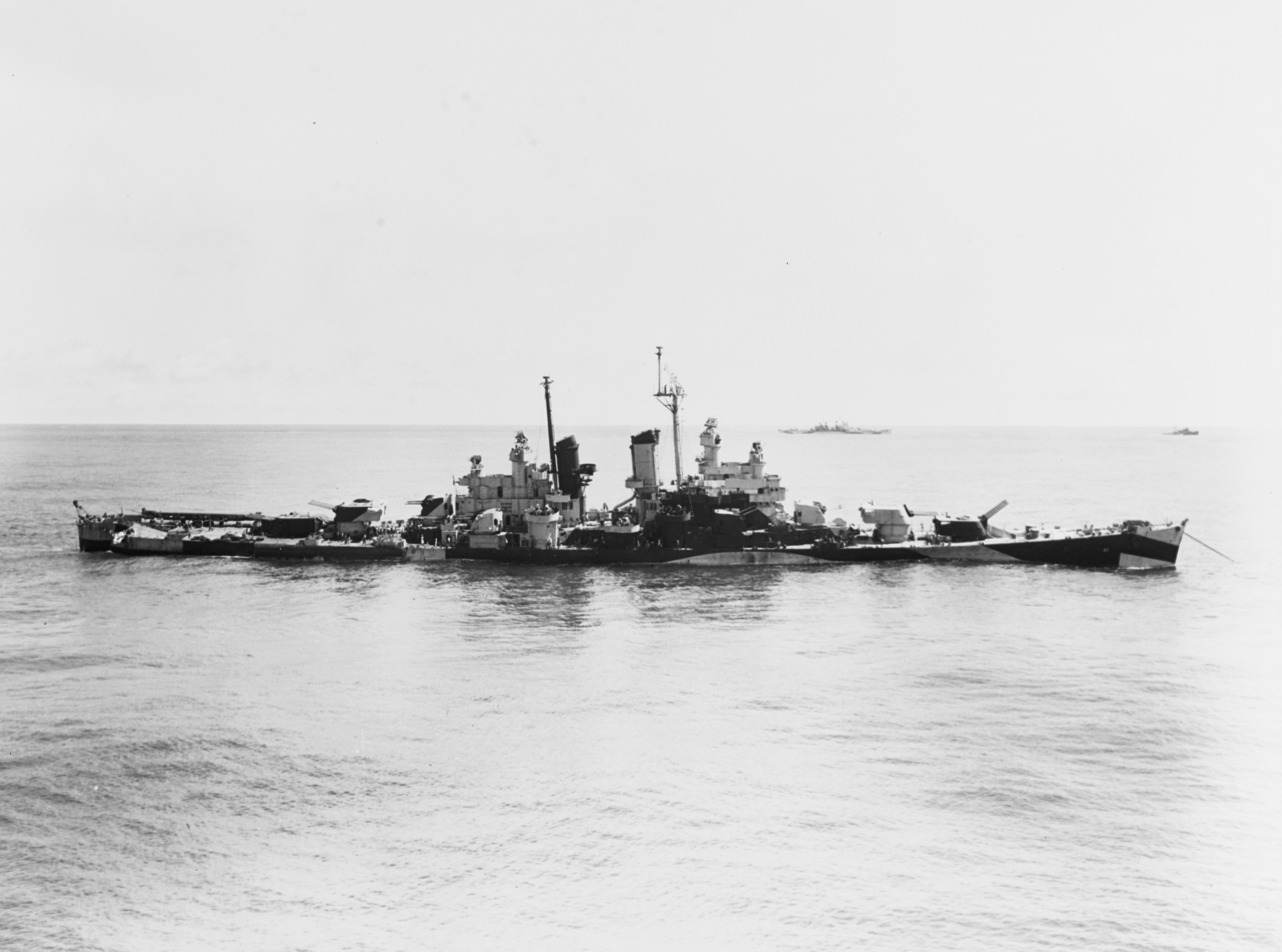
Houston, low in the water, on 17 October

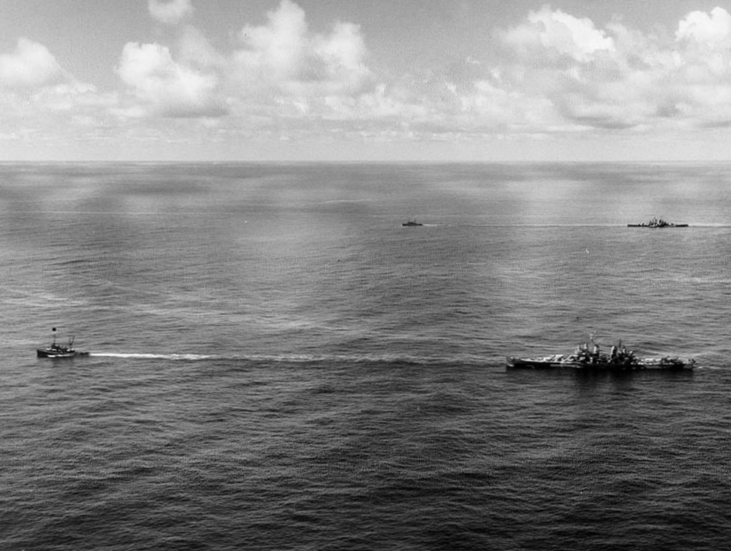
USS Canberra (foreground) and Houston (background) under tow on 18 October

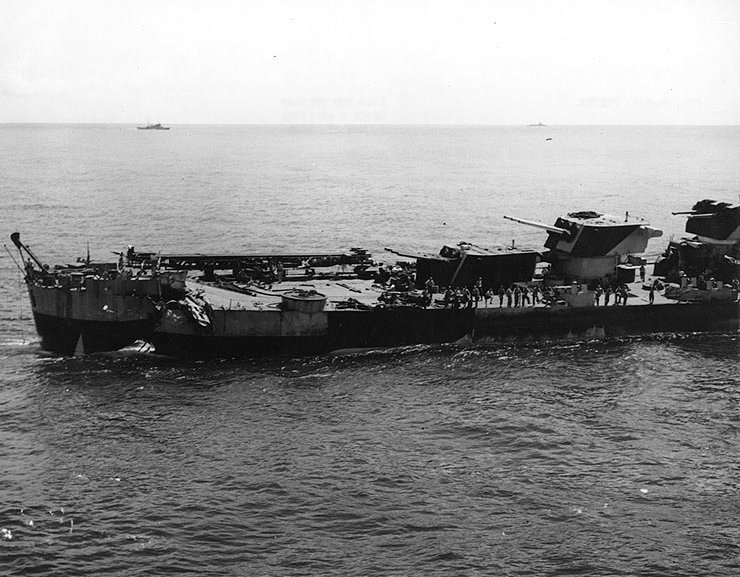
Houston's badly damaged stern

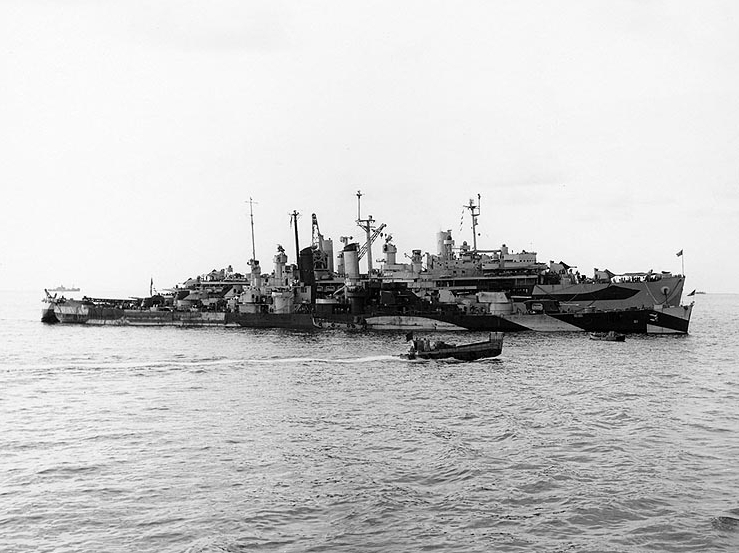
Houston alongside Hector at Ulithi for repairs

=== Post-War service ===
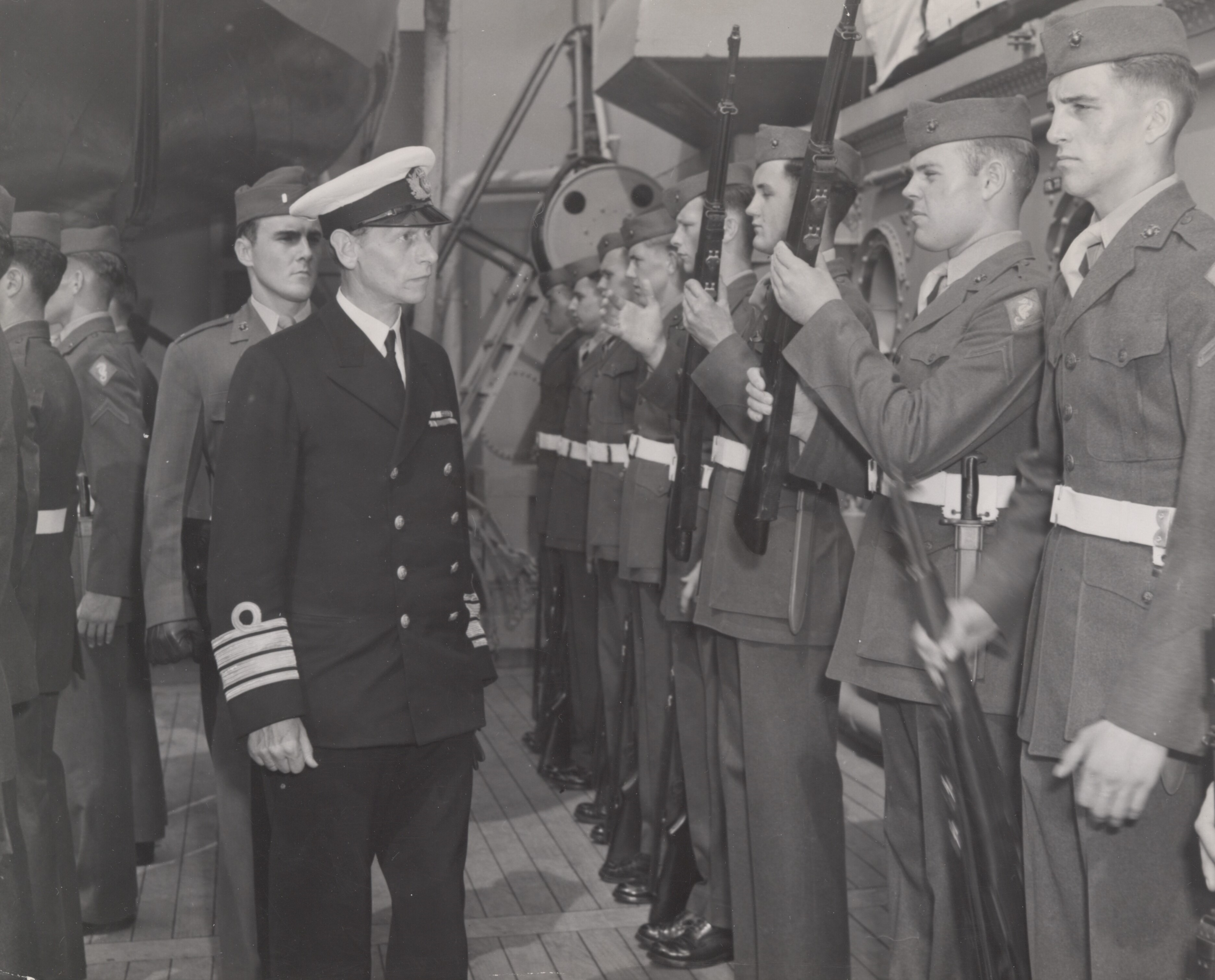
A H Vedel on board the USS Houston 1946

After returning to active service, Houston conducted refresher training for her crew in the Caribbean. She then joined training maneuvers held off Newport, Rhode Island. On 16 April 1946, she embarked on a goodwill cruise to visit European ports, including cities in Scandinavia, Portugal, and Italy; she also stopped in Egypt while cruising the Mediterranean Sea. Houston arrived back in the United States on 14 December and thereafter took part in various training exercises through 17 May 1947. At that time, she joined Cruiser Division 12 for another voyage to the Mediterranean. She returned to Philadelphia on 16 August, and was decommissioned on 15 December. She was allocated to the reserve fleet, remaining in the Navy's inventory until 1 March 1959, when she was stricken from the Naval Vessel Register and sold to be broken up.
