= USS ABSD-3 =

WWII American floating drydock

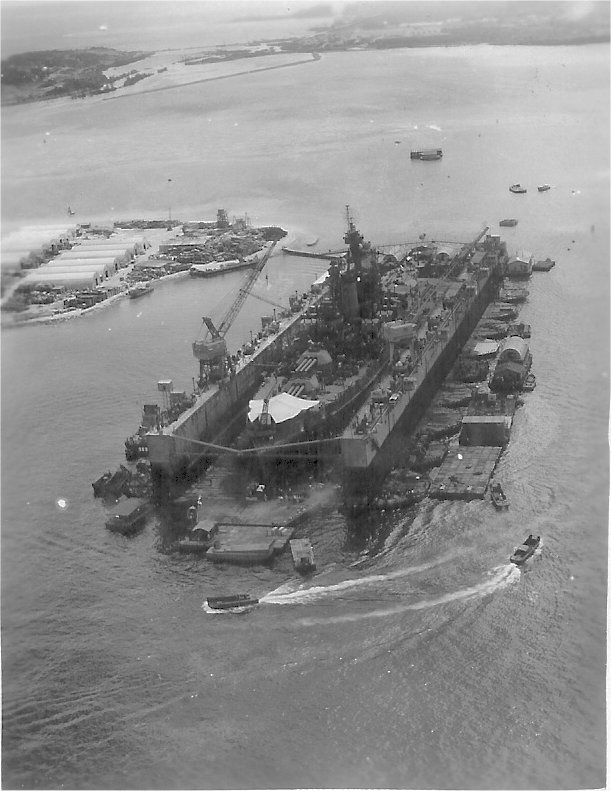
- ABSD-3 at Guam Apra Harbor repairing the USS Pennsylvania (BB-38) in September of 1945

History

United States
- Name: ABSD-3 (AFDB-3)
- Builder: Chicago Bridge & Iron Company (sections); Pollock-Stockton Shipbuilding Company (sections); Pittsburgh-Des Moines Steel Co. (section); Everett-Pacific Shipbuilding & Dry Dock Company in Everett, Washington (sections)
- Laid down: 1943-1943
- Launched: 1943
- Acquired: April 1944
- Commissioned: 27 October 1944
- Out of service: 1948
- Reclassified: AFDB-3 (Large Auxiliary Floating Dry Dock)
- Honours and awards: American Campaign Medal Asiatic-Pacific Campaign Medal World War II Victory Medal

General characteristics
- Type: Advance Base Sectional Drydock
- Displacement: 30,800 long tons (31,294 t)
- Length: 844 ft 3 in (257.33 m)
- Beam: 246 ft 5 in (75.11 m)
- Draft: 8 ft 8 in (2.64 m)
- Propulsion: None
- Complement: 22 officers and 471 enlisted men
- Armament: 14 × 40 mm (1.6 in) guns; 14 × 20 mm (0.79 in) guns

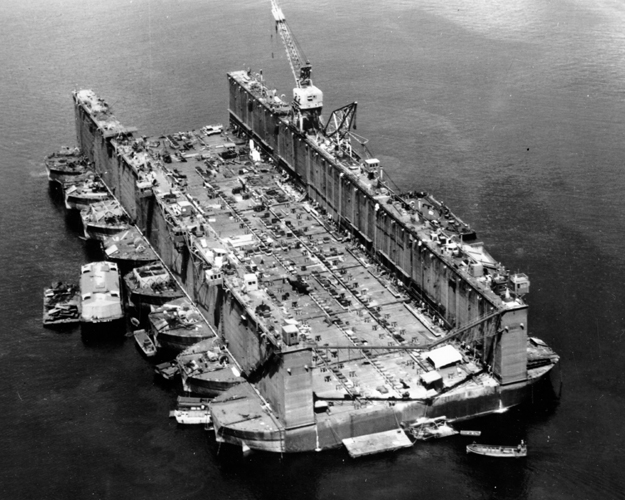
USS ABSD-3 at Guam, empty

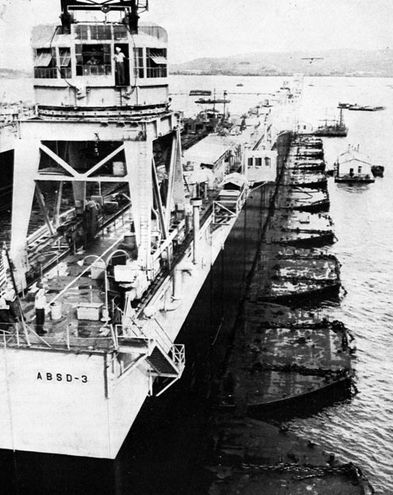
USS AFDB-3 (ABSD-3) with rail traveling 15-ton crane, in Guam

ABSD-3 is an advanced base sectional dock, constructed of nine advance base dock (ABD) sections for the US Navy as an auxiliary floating drydock for World War II. ABSD-3 was delivered to the US Navy in April 1944, and was commissioned on 27 October 1944. Advance Base Sectional Dock-3 (Auxiliary Floating Dock Big-3) was constructed in sections during 1942 and 1943.

Each section was 3,850 tons and 80 feet long. Each section had a 256 feet beam, 75 feet molded depth and 10,000 tons lifting capacity. There were four ballast compartments in each section. With all nine sections joined, she was 844 feet long and 28 feet tall (keel to welldeck), with an inside clear width of 133 feet 7 inches. The length includes 3 feet between each section and 50 platforms at each end. There were 12 ballast tanks in each section. ABSD-2 had a traveling 15-ton capacity crane with an 85-foot radius and two or more support barges. The two side walls were folded down under tow to reduce wind resistance and lower the center of gravity. ABSD-3 had six capstans for pulling, each rated at 24,000 lbf (110,000 N) at 30 ft/min (0.15 m/s). Four of the capstans were reversible.

== Construction ==
The nine sections that made up dock ABSD-3 were built at four different shipyards, to speed up construction:

- Section A - Pollock-Stockton Shipbuilding Company in Stockton, California
- Sections B & F - Everett-Pacific Shipbuilding & Dry Dock Company in Everett, Washington
- Sections C & E - Chicago Bridge in Morgan City, Louisiana
- Sections D, G, H & I - Pittsburgh-Des Moines Steel Co., Pittsburgh, Pennsylvania

== World War II ==
Commissioned on 27 October 1944, the USS ABSD-3 was assigned to the Asiatic-Pacific Theater. It was towed in sections to the Naval Base Guam at Apra Harbor in Guam, Marianas Islands. After assembling she was placed in service to repair ships at Guam with ABSD-6.

On an island in the harbor at Guam the Navy built a base to support the crew of ABSD-3 and ABSD-6. At the base were supplies, movie theater, mess hall, officers' clubs, movie theater, and enlisted club. The base was built mostly with quonset huts.

The largest repairs at Guam were that of the USS Pennsylvania near the end of World War II; the ship was hit by a kamikaze attack off Okinawa on 12 August 1945. Due to the Pennsylvania's 28.9 ft (8.8 m) draft with a full load, the battleship had to unload much of her ammunition and fuel oil before entering AFDB-3. The USS Idaho (BB-42) was also repaired in ABSD-3 after a kamikaze attack on the same day.

Able to lift 90,000 tons, ABSD-3 could raise large ships such as aircraft carriers, battleships, cruisers, and large auxiliary ships, out of the water for repair below the waterline. She was also used to repair multiple smaller ships at the same time. Ships in continuous use during war need repair both from wear and from war damage from naval mine and torpedoes. Rudders and propellers are best serviced on dry docks. Without ABSD-2 and her sister ships, at remote locations months could be lost in a ships returning to a home port for repair. ABSD-3 had power stations, ballast pumps, repair shops, and machine shops, and could be self-sustaining. ABSD-2 had two rail track moveable cranes able to lift tons of material and parts, for removing damaged parts and installing new parts.

The first ship repaired at Guam was on 5 March 1945 and the last ship on 5 March 1946, after one year of operation.

- Ships ABSD-3 repaired during World War 2:
- USS Napa
- LST 802
- LST 822
- PC 42
- USS Minneapolis
- LCI 544
- LCI 610
- AK 142 - Cargo Ship
- LST 688
- LST 442
- YD USS McInteze
- USS Alnitah
- LST 827
- HM LST-421
- USS LST-486
- LCT 840
- LCT 830
- LCT 868
- LCT 846
- AOD 186
- USS LST-546
- LST 646
- LCI 890
- LCI 910
- USS Idaho
- USS South Dakota
- USS Arkansas
- YNT AN-48 USS Lancewood
- YNT AN-47 USS Canotia
- USS LST-1000
- USS LST-767
- LST 609
- USS Pittsburgh
- YDGT 7
- SC-760
- SC-1317
- YMS 403
- YMS 361
- YMS 163
- AGS 14
- APC 102 s
- APC 25
- APC 45
- USS Earle B. Hall
- USS Tillman
- YMS 845
- AM 50
- USS Rescue
- AK USS Edward G. Acheson
- USS Munsee
- LCI 562
- SC 658
- AV 4
- LST 789
- LSM 476
- USS St. George
- LST 800
- LSM 208
- LCT 971
- LCT 358
- LCT 1182
- LCT 911
- LCT 912
- LCT 945
- LCT 817
- LCI 321
- SC 677
- AK SS E B
- AK SS Abigail Adams
- FD 188 US Army
- LCT 1185
- YMS 163
- GS 11
- LSM 439
- SC 654
- USS Lamar
- USS Kern
- LCI 1290
- PC 787
- AK SS Ida Tarbell
- Ak SS SS Carlos J. Finlay
- LCT 803
- MS 323
- AN 68
- YMS 275
- YTB 299
- YD
- AU 22
- LCT 1010
- LCT 905
- USS Pennsylvania
- APA SS B. Dixon
- GAGL 308 Papaw
- USS Wantuck
- LCI 910
- LCI 784
- BCL 3068 (Concrete#42 Uranium)
- YPK 3
- USS Mona Island
- YC 1132
- USS Locust
- YF 771
- LST 621
- LST 831
- USS LST-931
- LCI 461
- LCI 355
- LST 986
- LCM 184
- LCM 37
- LCM 256
- LCI 689
- YF 768
- APL 15 APL-2
- LCI 817
- LCI 1064
- LCM 140
- LCM 142
- FS-255
- FS 229

== Post-war ==
After the war ABSD-3 was decommissioned from the US Navy on 1 April 1946. Some sections were laid up in the Atlantic Reserve Fleet in Green Cove Springs, Florida. Some sections were stored in the James River Reserve Fleet from 1979 to 1982.

She was struck from the Naval Register on 1 August 1981.

On 1 April 1982 eight sections were sold to Bath Iron Works in Bath, Maine. In 1982 she was towed to Portland, Maine. Bath Iron Works used the dock to lift new-built guided missile destroyers (DDG) to install sonar domes on the new ships' bows. The USS Samuel B. Roberts (FFG-58) was one of the ships serviced at the Bath Iron Works in May 1998. Bath Iron Works built a new land dry lock facility and no longer needed ABSD-3.

In 1999 she was sold and then in 2000 moved to two pieces (four sections) with the heavy-lift ship MV Blue Marlin to a shipyard in Rijeka, Croatia.
