= HM LST-412 =

1942 LST-1-class tank landing ship

History

United Kingdom
- Name: LST-412
- Ordered: as a Type S3-M-K2 hull, MCE hull 932
- Builder: Bethlehem-Fairfield Shipyard, Baltimore, Maryland
- Yard number: 2184
- Laid down: 24 September 1942
- Launched: 16 November 1942
- Commissioned: 26 January 1943
- Decommissioned: 23 January 1946
- Identification: Hull symbol: LST-412
- Fate: Returned to USN, 23 January 1946

United States
- Name: LST-412
- Acquired: 23 January 1946
- Stricken: 20 March 1946
- Fate: Sold for scrapping, 16 December 1947

General characteristics
- Class & type: LST-1-class tank landing ship
- Displacement: 1,625 long tons (1,651 t) (light); 4,080 long tons (4,145 t) (full (seagoing draft with 1,675 short tons (1,520 t) load); 2,366 long tons (2,404 t) (beaching)
- Length: 328 ft (100 m) oa
- Beam: 50 ft (15 m)
- Draft: Unloaded: 2 ft 4 in (0.71 m) forward; 7 ft 6 in (2.29 m) aft; Full load: 8 ft 2 in (2.49 m) forward; 14 ft 1 in (4.29 m) aft; Landing with 500 short tons (450 t) load: 3 ft 11 in (1.19 m) forward; 9 ft 10 in (3.00 m) aft
- Installed power: 2 × 900 hp (670 kW) Electro-Motive Diesel 12-567A diesel engines; 1,700 shp (1,300 kW)
- Propulsion: 1 × Falk main reduction gears; 2 × Propellers
- Speed: 12 kn (22 km/h; 14 mph)
- Range: 24,000 nmi (44,000 km; 28,000 mi) at 9 kn (17 km/h; 10 mph) while displacing 3,960 long tons (4,024 t)
- Boats & landing craft carried: 2 x LCVPs
- Capacity: 1,600–1,900 short tons (3,200,000–3,800,000 lb; 1,500,000–1,700,000 kg) cargo depending on mission
- Troops: 163
- Complement: 117
- Armament: Varied, ultimate armament; 1 × QF 12-pounder 12 cwt naval gun; 6 × 20 mm (0.79 in) Oerlikon cannon; 4 × Fast Aerial Mine (FAM) mounts

HMS LST-412 was a United States Navy LST-1-class tank landing ship that was transferred to the Royal Navy during World War II. As with many of her class, the ship was never named. Instead, she was referred to by her hull designation.

== Construction ==
LST-412 was laid down on 24 September 1942, under Maritime Commission (MARCOM) contract, MC hull 932, by the Bethlehem-Fairfield Shipyard, Baltimore, Maryland; launched 16 November 1942; then transferred to the United Kingdom and commissioned on 23 January 1943.

== Service history ==
LST-412, in company with sister ships LST-324 and LST-421, left New York, 13 March 1943, with refinery equipment bound for Curaçao, she then sailed to Freetown, Sierra Leone. LST-412 participated with the Royal Navy during the invasion of Normandy, June 1944.

LST-412 saw no active service in the United States Navy. She was decommissioned and returned to United States Navy custody on 23 January 1946, and struck from the Navy list on 20 March 1946. On 16 December 1947, LST-412 was sold to the Northern Metals Co., Philadelphia, Pennsylvania, and subsequently scrapped.

== See also ==
- List of United States Navy LSTs

== Notes ==
Citations

== Bibliography ==
Online resources

- "LST-412". Dictionary of American Naval Fighting Ships. Naval History and Heritage Command. This article incorporates text from this source, which is in the public domain.
- "Bethlehem-Fairfield, Baltimore MD". www.ShipbuildingHistory.com. 14 August 2008.
- "USS LST-412". NavSource. 7 March 2014.
