= USS South Dakota (BB-57) =

Fast battleship of the United States Navy

Coordinates: 43°32′36″N 96°45′46″W

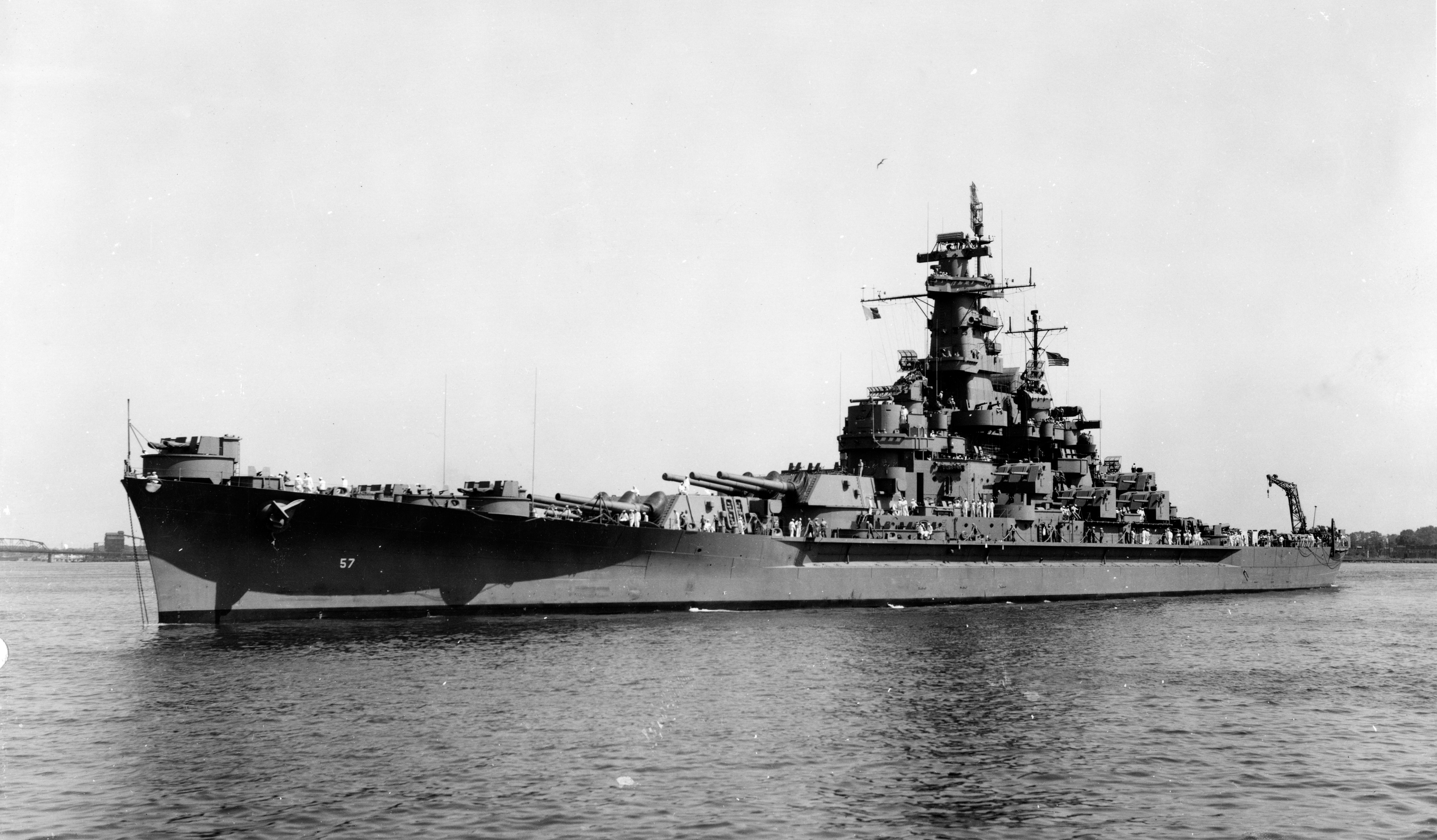
- USS South Dakota anchored in Norfolk, 1943.

History

United States
- Namesake: South Dakota
- Ordered: 15 December 1938
- Builder: New York Shipbuilding Corporation
- Laid down: 5 July 1939
- Launched: 7 June 1941
- Commissioned: 20 March 1942
- Decommissioned: 31 January 1947
- Stricken: 1 June 1962
- Fate: Broken up, 1962

General characteristics
- Class & type: South Dakota-class battleship
- Displacement: Standard: 37,970 long tons (38,579 t); Full load: 44,519 long tons (45,233 t)
- Length: 680 ft (210 m) o/a
- Beam: 108 ft 2 in (32.97 m)
- Draft: 35 ft 1 in (10.69 m)
- Installed power: 130,000 shp (97,000 kW); 8 × Babcock & Wilcox boilers
- Propulsion: 4 × General Electric steam turbines; 4 × screw propellers
- Speed: 27.5 knots (50.9 km/h; 31.6 mph)
- Range: 15,000 nmi (28,000 km; 17,000 mi) at 15 kn (28 km/h; 17 mph)
- Crew: 1,793 officers and enlisted men (peace); 2,500 officers and enlisted men (war)
- Armament: 9 × 16 in (406.4 mm)/45 caliber Mark 6 guns; 16 × 5 in (127 mm)/38 caliber DP guns; 7 × quad 40 mm (1.6 in) Bofors guns; 7 × quad 1.1 in (28 mm) guns; 34 × 20 mm (0.79 in) Oerlikon cannons; 8 × .50-cal machine-guns
- Armor: Belt: 12.2 in (310 mm); Deck: 6 in (152 mm); Turrets: 18 in (457 mm); Barbettes: 17.3 in (439 mm); Conning tower: 16 in
- Aircraft carried: 3 × "Kingfisher" floatplanes
- Aviation facilities: 2 × catapults

USS South Dakota, hull number BB-57, was the lead vessel of the four South Dakota-class fast battleships built for the United States Navy in the 1930s. The first American battleships designed after the Washington treaty system began to break down in the mid-1930s, the South Dakotas were able to take advantage of a treaty clause that allowed them to increase the main battery to 16-inch (406 mm) guns. However, congressional refusal to authorize larger battleships kept their displacement close to the Washington limit of 35,000 long tons (35,562 t). A requirement to be armored against the same caliber of guns as they carried, combined with the displacement restriction, resulted in cramped ships. Overcrowding was exacerbated by wartime modifications that considerably strengthened their anti-aircraft batteries and significantly increased their crews.

South Dakota saw extensive action during World War II; immediately upon entering service in mid-1942, she was sent to the south Pacific to reinforce Allied forces waging the Guadalcanal campaign. The ship was damaged in an accidental grounding on an uncharted reef, but after completing repairs she returned to the front, taking part in the Battle of Santa Cruz in October and the Second Naval Battle of Guadalcanal in November. During the latter action, electrical failures hampered the ability of the ship to engage Japanese warships and she became the target of numerous Japanese vessels, sustaining over two-dozen hits that significantly damaged her superstructure but did not seriously threaten her buoyancy. South Dakota returned to the United States for repairs that lasted into 1943, after which she was briefly deployed to strengthen the British Home Fleet, tasked with protecting convoys to the Soviet Union.

In mid-1943, the ship was transferred back to the Pacific, where she primarily operated with the fast carrier task force, contributing her heavy anti-aircraft armament to its defense. In this capacity, she took part in the Gilbert and Marshall Islands campaign in late 1943 and early 1944, the Mariana and Palau Islands campaign in mid-1944, and the Philippines campaign later that year. In 1945, she participated in the Battles of Iwo Jima and Okinawa and bombarded Japan three times. Following the end of the war in August 1945, she took part in the initial occupation of the country before returning to the United States in September. She later moved to the Philadelphia Naval Shipyard, where she was laid up in the Atlantic Reserve Fleet until 1962, when she was sold for scrap.

== Design ==
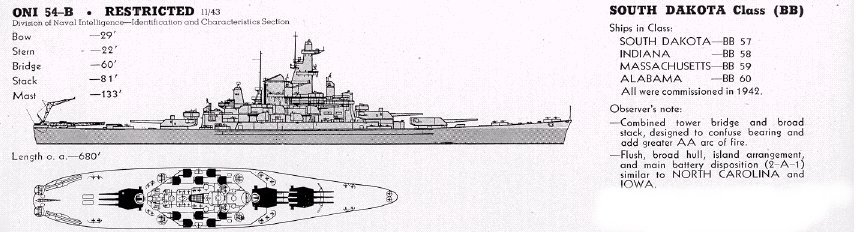
Recognition drawing of the South Dakota class

The South Dakota was ordered in the context of global naval rearmament during the breakdown of the Washington treaty system that had controlled battleship construction during the 1920s and early 1930s. Under the Washington and London treaties, so-called treaty battleships were limited to a standard displacement of 35,000 long tons (35,562 t) and a main battery of 14-inch (356 mm) guns. In 1936, following Japan's decision to abandon the treaty system, the United States Navy decided to invoke the "escalator clause" in the treaty that allowed displacements to rise to 45,000 long tons (45,722 t) and armament to increase to 16 in (406 mm) guns. Congressional objections to increasing the size of the new ships forced the design staff to keep displacement as close to 35,000 LT as possible while incorporating the larger guns and armor sufficient to defeat guns of the same caliber. The ship cost $52.8-million (equivalent to $799 million today), making it one of the most expensive American naval ships at the time.

South Dakota was 680 feet (210 m) long overall and had a beam of 108 ft 2 in (32.97 m) and a draft of 35 ft 1 in (10.69 m). She displaced 37,970 long tons (38,579 t) as designed and up to 44,519 long tons (45,233 t) at full combat load. The ship was powered by four-shaft General Electric steam turbines and eight oil-fired Babcock & Wilcox boilers rated at 130,000 shaft horsepower (97,000 kW), generating a top speed of 27.5 knots (50.9 km/h; 31.6 mph). The ship had a cruising range of 15,000 nautical miles (28,000 km; 17,000 mi) at a speed of 15 kn (28 km/h; 17 mph). She carried three Vought OS2U Kingfisher floatplanes for aerial reconnaissance, which were launched by a pair of aircraft catapults on her fantail. Her peace time crew numbered 1,793 officers and enlisted men but during the war the crew swelled to 2,500.

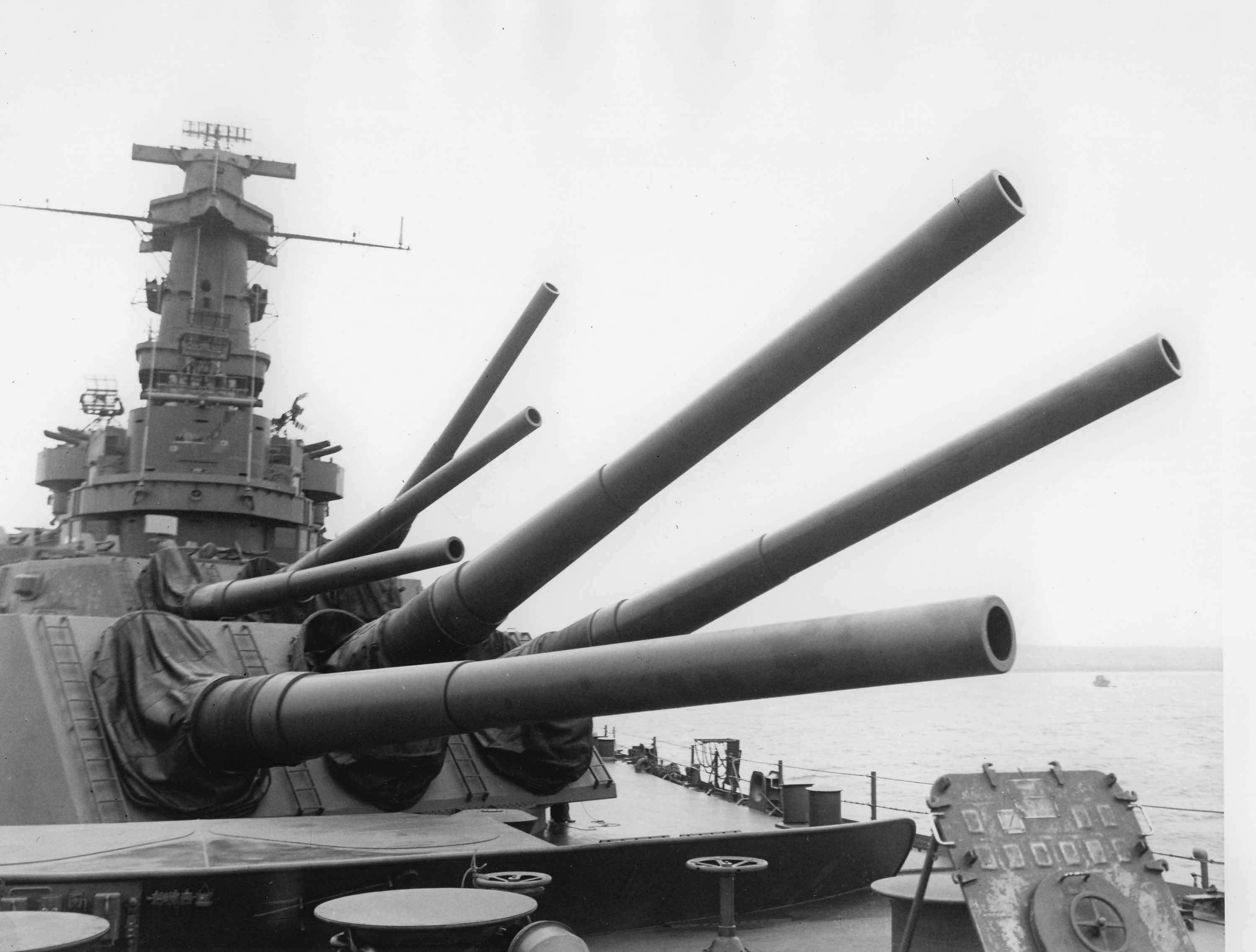
South Dakota's forward turrets; note the various radar sets on the tower mast

The ship was armed with a main battery of nine 16-inch /45 caliber Mark 6 guns (Note: /45 refers to the length of the gun in terms of calibers. A /45 gun is 45 times long as it is in bore diameter.) in three triple gun turrets on the centerline, two of which were placed in a superfiring pair forward, with the third aft. The secondary battery consisted of sixteen 5 in (127 mm) /38 caliber dual purpose guns mounted in twin turrets clustered amidships, four turrets on either side. This was two fewer turrets than her sisters, a reduction in weight and magazine space to accommodate the extra personnel and equipment for her use as a flagship. To compensate for the reduction in medium anti-aircraft firepower, she received light anti-aircraft guns. As designed, the ship was equipped with an anti-aircraft battery of twenty 1.1 in (28 mm) /75 caliber guns and twelve .50-caliber M2 Browning machine guns in single mounts, but she was completed with a battery of seven quadruple 40 mm (1.6 in) Bofors guns, seven quadruple 1.1 in guns, thirty-four 20 mm (0.79 in) Oerlikon autocannon in single mounts, and eight of the .50-cal. guns.

The main armored belt was 12.2 in (310 mm) thick, while the main armored deck was up to 6 in (152 mm) thick. The main battery gun turrets had 18 in (457 mm) thick faces, and they were mounted atop barbettes that were 17.3 in (439 mm) thick. The conning tower had 16 in thick sides.

=== Modifications ===
South Dakota received a series of modifications through her wartime career, consisting primarily of additions to her anti-aircraft battery and various types of radar sets. The first addition was the installation of SC air search radar, ordered in 1941, that was fitted in the fore mast. It was later replaced with an SK type set. At the same time, an SG surface search radar was installed on the forward superstructure; a second SG set was added to the main mast after experiences during the Guadalcanal campaign in 1942. During fitting out in 1942, she received a Mark 3 fire control radar, mounted on her conning tower to assist in the direction of her main battery guns and Mark 4 radars for the secondary battery guns. The Mark 3 was quickly replaced with more modern Mark 8 fire control radar, and Mark 4 radars for the secondary battery guns. She later received Mark 12/22 sets in place of the Mark 4s. South Dakota also received a TDY jammer. In 1945, her traditional spotting scopes were replaced with Mark 27 microwave radar sets, and she received an SR air search radar and an SK-2 air search dish.

The ship's light anti-aircraft battery was gradually expanded. In November 1942, eight more .50-cal machine guns were installed and during repairs in late 1942 and early 1943, two of her 1.1 in quadruple mounts were replaced with 40 mm quadruple mounts. By February 1943, all of her 1.1 in guns were removed and thirteen more 40 mm quadruple mounts were added. By this time, her 20 mm battery had been increased to 80 barrels, all in individual mounts. By the end of the war, eight of these had been removed.

== Service history ==
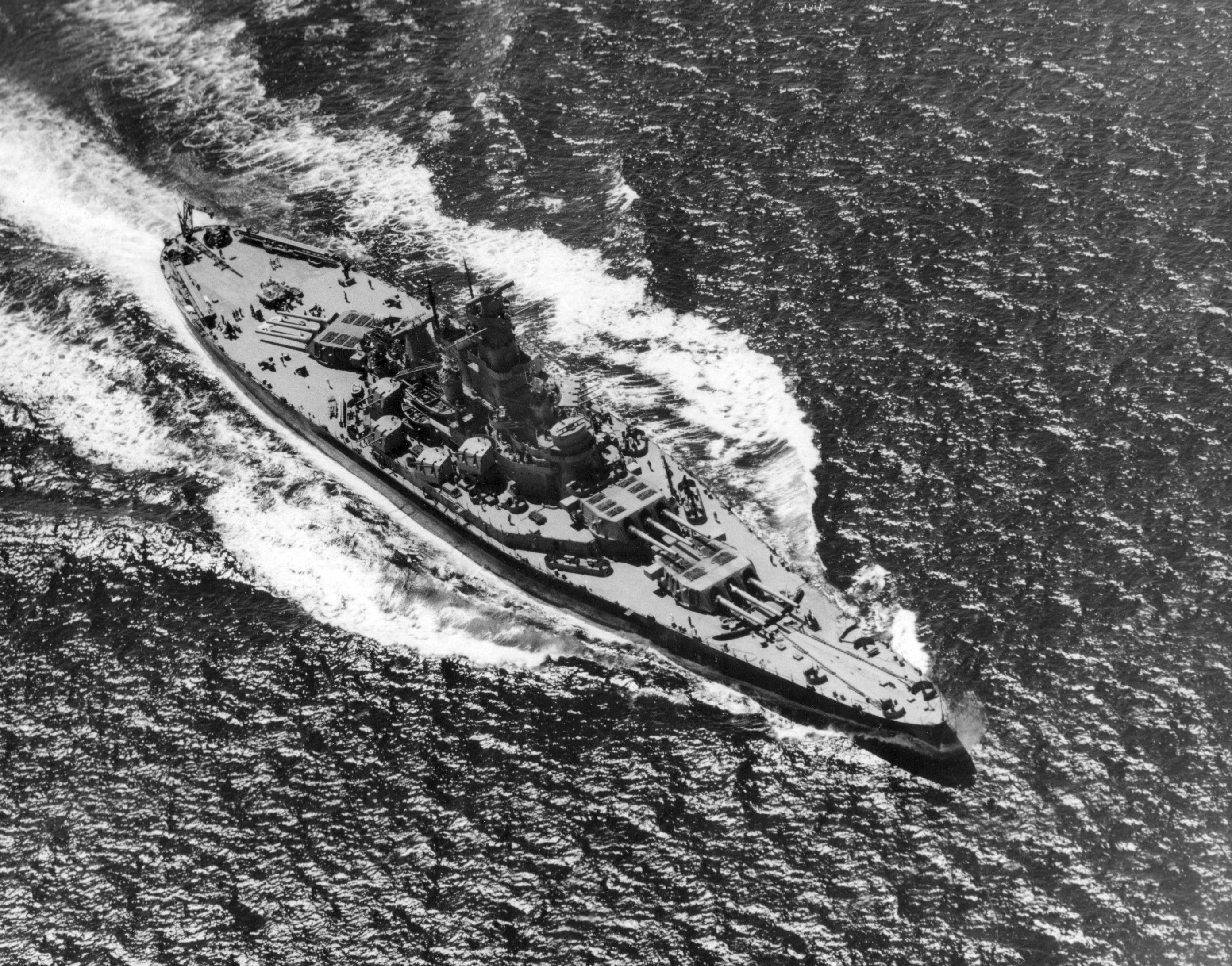
South Dakota during her shakedown cruise

The keel for South Dakota was laid down on 5 July 1939, at the New York Shipbuilding Corporation in Camden, New Jersey. She was launched on 7 June 1941 and was commissioned into the fleet on 20 March 1942. She was then towed across the river to the Philadelphia Navy Yard and began fitting out; Captain Thomas Leigh Gatch was her first commanding officer. This work was completed by 14 May, and over the next two days she did machinery tests in the Delaware River, followed by more fitting out work that lasted until 3 June. Two days later, she began her shakedown cruise, escorted by four destroyers owing to the threat of German U-boats operating off the east coast of the United States. Over the following two days, she tested her engines at various speeds and test fired her guns to check for structural problems. Training in the area continued until 17 July and the next day, she departed for Hampton Roads, Virginia with four destroyers as escort. From there, she cruised back north to meet the battleship Washington off the coast of Maine before anchoring at Casco Bay on 21 July. There, she engaged in further firing practice before steaming to Philadelphia and being declared ready for active duty on 26 July.

=== First Pacific deployment ===
As the fighting between American and Japanese forces in the Guadalcanal Campaign intensified, particularly after the Allied defeat at the Battle of Savo Island, Admiral Ernest King, the Chief of Naval Operations, ordered South Dakota, Washington, the light cruiser Juneau, and six destroyers to deploy to the south Pacific to reinforce the American fleet there. Rear Admiral (RADM) Willis Lee took command of the ships, designated Battleship Division (BatDiv) 6 on 14 August, hoisting his flag aboard South Dakota. The next day, she got underway escorted by three destroyers, but her progress was delayed by an engine breakdown that necessitated repairs that were completed the following morning. After steaming south through the Caribbean, Lee detached the escorting destroyers, passed through the Panama Canal, and picked up three other destroyers on the Pacific side of the canal.

Later in August, while still en route to the Guadalcanal area, South Dakota rendezvoused with Juneau, the ships proceeding together to Nukuʻalofa, Tongatapu which they reached on 4 September. After refueling there, they left the port on 6 September, but South Dakota was badly damaged when she struck an uncharted reef in the Lahai Passage. Divers from the repair ship Vestal inspected the hull and discovered a 150-foot (46 m) length of plating had been damaged. Workers from Vestal patched the hull, allowing her to depart for Pearl Harbor on 12 September, where permanent repairs were effected. She joined the aircraft carrier Saratoga, which had been torpedoed by a Japanese submarine south of Guadalcanal, and her escorts for the voyage. Repairs lasted from 23 to 28 September, and the work also included removing the 1.1-inch guns, adding four 40 mm quad mounts and twenty-two 20 mm guns.

After loading ammunition and supplies, South Dakota was pronounced ready for sea on 12 October 1942. She conducted anti-aircraft training through the following day before returning to Pearl Harbor on 14 October. She departed for the south Pacific later that day in company with Task Force 16 (TF), which included the aircraft carrier Enterprise, with nine escorting destroyers. Vice Admiral William F. Halsey, the South Pacific Area commander, ordered TF 16 to sweep for Japanese naval forces north of the Santa Cruz Islands before turning south-west toward the Solomon Islands to block the Japanese path to Guadalcanal. For the operation, TF 16 was reinforced by TF 17—centered on the carrier Hornet—which were combined to form TF 61 under the command of RADM Thomas C. Kinkaid. The force was supported by Lee with TF 64, which comprised Washington, two heavy cruisers, two light cruisers, and six destroyers.

==== Battle of the Santa Cruz Islands ====
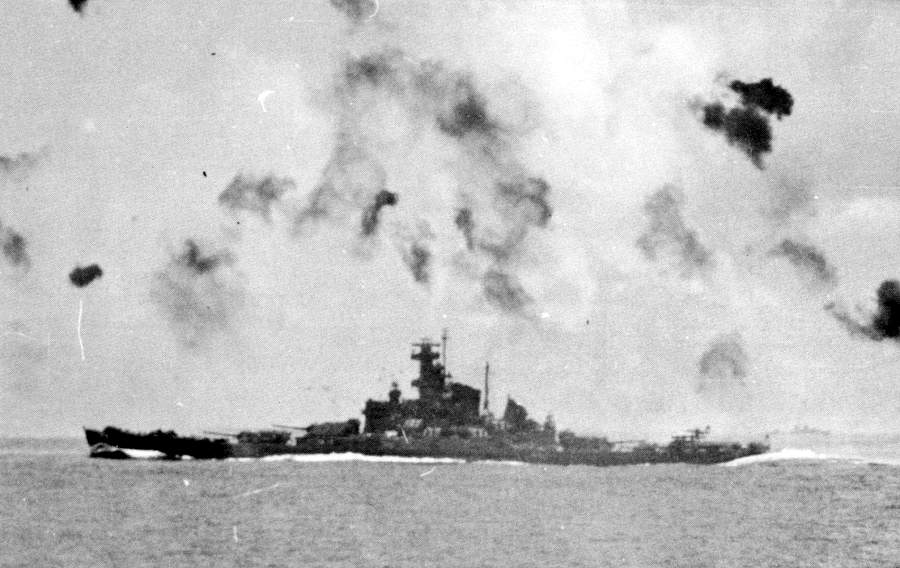
South Dakota at the Battle of Santa Cruz

Japanese and American reconnaissance aircraft discovered each other's fleets on 25 October 1942, and South Dakota's crew prepared for a night surface action that night, though the anticipated Japanese attack did not materialize. Japanese reconnaissance aircraft that had spotted Lee's force east of Rennell Island had drawn the Japanese fleet in his direction, away from TF 61. The next morning, aircraft from Enterprise located the Japanese aircraft carriers minutes before a Japanese seaplane located TF 61; both sides immediately launched air strikes, leading to the Battle of the Santa Cruz Islands. The first Japanese wave struck Hornet's group, inflicting serious damage on the carrier and forcing her to withdraw, though South Dakota and Enterprise were left unmolested. Hornet's withdrawal allowed the Japanese carriers to concentrate their attacks on Enterprise's group.

A second strike later that morning, shortly after 10:00 targeted the Enterprise group, and South Dakota provided heavy anti-aircraft fire to drive off the attackers; the ships shot down seven Japanese aircraft and fighters claimed another three. A third wave hit the task force an hour later, and at 11:48, a group of Nakajima B5N torpedo bombers attacked South Dakota. She evaded the torpedoes and shot down one of the attackers. A fourth strike arrived over the fleet half an hour later, and several Aichi D3A dive bombers attacked South Dakota. Most of the bombs fell harmlessly in the sea, but one scored a hit on her forward main battery turret roof, though it exploded without penetrating. Gatch, who was out on the bridge wing to spot the bombers so he could try to maneuver the vessel away, was wounded by a bomb splinter and the concussion from the blast threw him into the wall and knocked him unconscious. Two men were killed and over fifty were wounded by fragments from the bomb. Splinters from the bomb damaged the center and left gun of the number two turret. The gun crew was eventually informed by the Bureau of Ordnance that the gouges were deep enough that the barrels should not be fired.

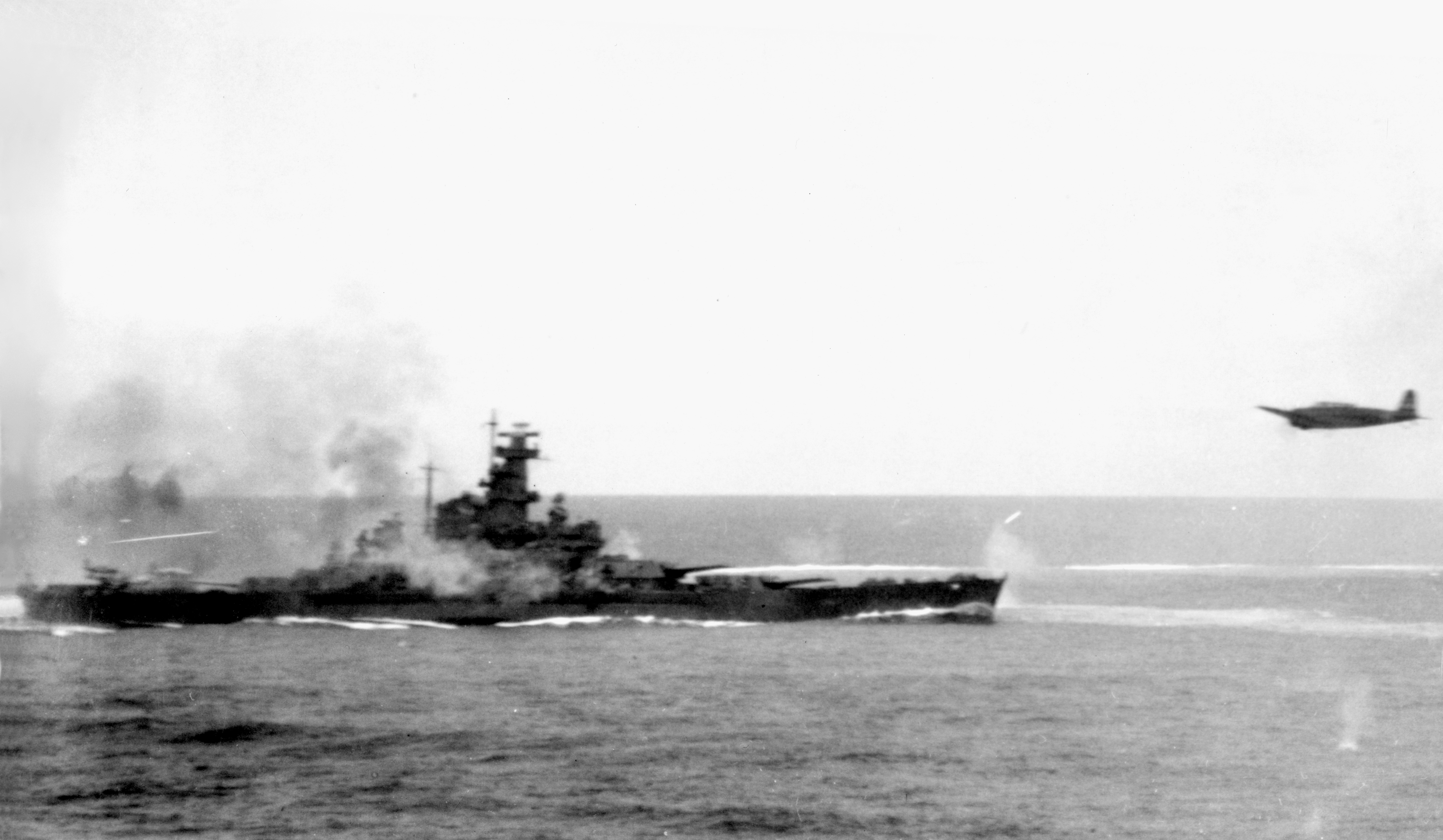
South Dakota fires at a Japanese torpedo bomber (right) during the Battle of Santa Cruz. The smoke around the battleship is from the ship's anti-aircraft guns.

A miscommunication while transferring steering control to the executive officer's (XO) station caused South Dakota to haul out of formation, briefly headed toward Enterprise before the XO corrected the mistake. The two fleets then disengaged as night approached. South Dakota's gunners claimed to have shot down 26 Japanese aircraft, but only 13 had actually been shot down by all of the ships of TF 16 combined. The ship suffered two fatalities and around sixty wounded between the bomb hit and strafing runs from Mitsubishi A6M Zero fighters. The effectiveness of South Dakota's anti-aircraft fire was exaggerated in the press after the battle; the 5-inch, 1.1-inch, and 40 mm guns had difficulty tracking targets through the low clouds. The 20 mm guns, with their shorter effective range, were not hampered by the reduced visibility and accounted for two-thirds of the aircraft South Dakota shot down, according to the ship's after action report.

Though the Japanese carriers survived the battle and Hornet eventually had to be scuttled, the Japanese had lost 99 aircraft, nearly half of the carriers' complement, devastating Japanese naval aviation, which relied on a small number of highly trained veterans that could not be easily replaced. While attempting to avoid a submarine contact on the return trip to Nouméa, South Dakota collided with the destroyer Mahan on 30 October. Both South Dakota and Mahan suffered significant damage, with Mahan's bow deflected to port and crumpled back to Frame 14. Both warships continued to Nouméa, where Vestal repaired South Dakota's collision and battle damage.

The repair team flooded some of South Dakota's internal compartments to induce a list to expose the damaged hull plating; the work lasted from 1 to 6 November, and Gatch had returned to duty the previous day. By this time, Enterprise was the only active carrier in the Pacific, and so Halsey ordered Washington to join South Dakota as part of the escort force to protect the valuable carrier. TF 16 now consisted of South Dakota, Enterprise, Washington, the heavy cruiser Northampton, and nine destroyers. The ships sortied on 11 November to return to the fighting off Guadalcanal. The cruiser Pensacola and two more destroyers joined them the following day. On 13 November, after learning that a major Japanese attack was approaching, Halsey detached South Dakota, Washington, and four of the destroyers as Task Group 16.3, again under Lee's command. Enterprise, her forward elevator damaged from the action at Santa Cruz, was kept to the south as a reserve. The ships of TG 16.3 were to block an anticipated Japanese bombardment group in the waters off Guadalcanal.

==== Second Naval Battle of Guadalcanal ====
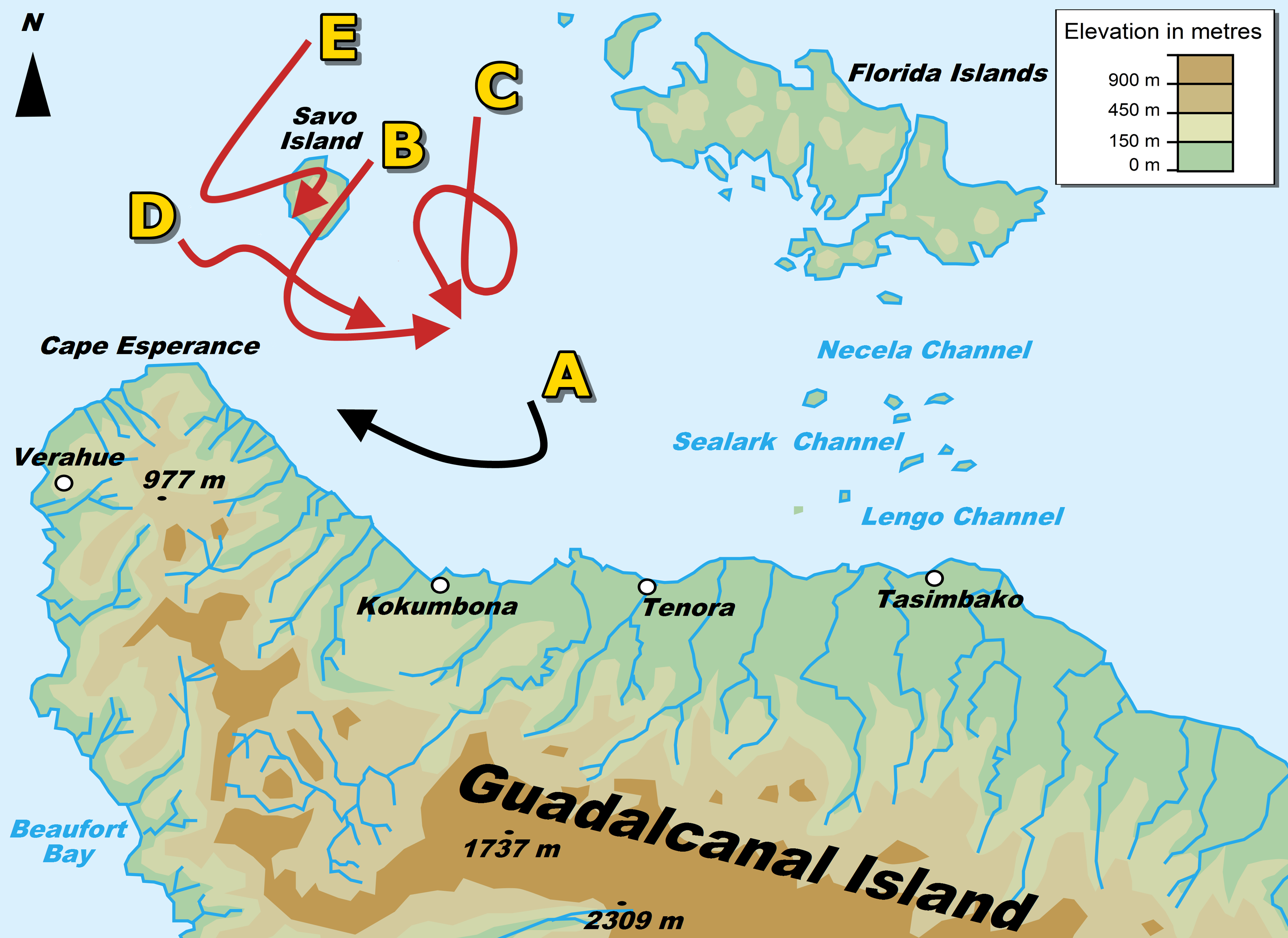
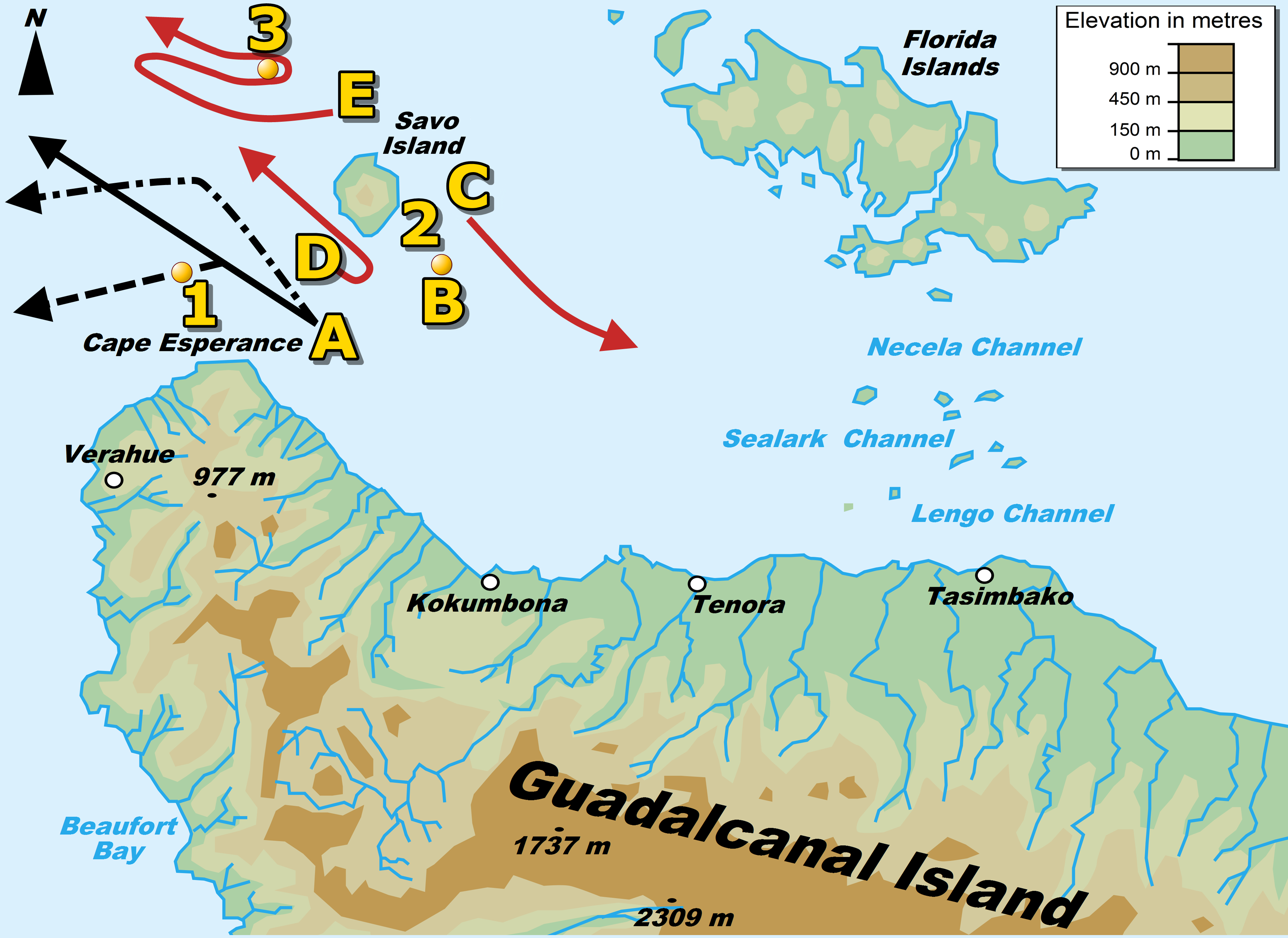
Top: First phase of the battle; American forces are in black and Japanese are in red. Bottom: Second phase of the battle; South Dakota's movements are denoted by the dot and dashed line.

As Lee's task group approached Guadalcanal, his Japanese counterpart Admiral Nobutake Kondō steamed to meet him with his main bombardment force, consisting of the fast battleship Kirishima, the heavy cruisers Takao and Atago, and a destroyer screen. While en route, TG 16.3 was re-designated as TF 64 on 14 November; the ships passed to the south of Guadalcanal and then rounded the western end of the island to block Kondō's expected route. Japanese aircraft reported sighting Lee's formation, but identification of the ships ranged from a group of cruisers and destroyers to aircraft carriers, causing confusion among the Japanese commanders. That evening, American reconnaissance aircraft spotted Japanese warships off Savo Island, prompting Lee to order his ships to general quarters. The four destroyers were arrayed ahead of the two battleships. The American task force, having been thrown together a day before, had not operated together as a unit, and both of the battleships had very limited experience shooting their main battery, particularly at night.

At around 23:00 on 14 November 1942, the leading Japanese destroyers in a screening force commanded by RADM Shintarō Hashimoto sent ahead of Kondō's main force spotted Lee's ships and turned about to warn Kondō. At about the same time, Washington's search radar picked up one of Hashimoto's cruisers and a destroyer. The ships' fire control radars then began tracking the Japanese vessels and Lee ordered both of his battleships to open fire when ready. Washington fired first at 23:17 at a range of 18,000 yd (16,000 m), followed quickly by South Dakota, though she was limited to four of her six forward guns owing to the damage to two of the barrels sustained at Santa Cruz. The ships used their radars to determine the range but their optical directors to aim the guns. South Dakota initially targeted the destroyer Shikinami; South Dakota missed, but Shikinami immediately turned to open the range. South Dakota then shifted fire to the destroyers Ayanami and Uranami; her spotters claimed South Dakota had hit both and set them on fire, but she scored no hits during this period. The former approached Washington too closely, however, and was quickly reduced to a flaming wreck, which was scuttled later.

Shortly thereafter, at about 23:30, an error in the electrical switchboard room knocked out power aboard South Dakota, disabling her radar systems and leaving the ship all but blind to the Japanese vessels approaching the force. By this time, Hashimoto's ships had inflicted serious damage on the American destroyer screen; two of the destroyers were torpedoed (one of which, Benham, survived until the following morning) and a third was destroyed by gunfire. This compounded South Dakota's problems, as she had to keep clear of the burning wrecks. By being forced to turn in front of the burning destroyers, the fires backlit South Dakota and highlighted her presence to the Japanese ships. At 23:40, she engaged Hashimoto's ships with her rear turret, which accidentally set her Kingfishers on fire, but a second salvo knocked two of the three burning aircraft overboard and blew out the fire on the third. Power was restored and she fired five salvos from her main battery at a range of 5,800 yd (5,300 m), but the shock of firing the guns caused further electrical failures, disabling her gunnery and search radars for five minutes shortly before midnight. Upon reactivating her search radar, South Dakota picked up numerous Japanese vessels directly ahead. These were Kondō's ships, and they immediately launched a volley of torpedoes at South Dakota, though they all missed.

Having inadvertently closed to within 5,000 yd (4,600 m) of Kondō's force, South Dakota bore the brunt of Japanese attacks during this phase of the battle. Japanese destroyers illuminated the ship and the rest of Kondō's vessels concentrated their fire on South Dakota. She received 27 hits during this phase, including a 14-inch shell from Kirishima that hit the rear turret and failed to penetrate the armor, though it damaged the training gear. Most of the hits came from the medium-caliber guns of the cruisers and destroyers, though they were largely confined to the superstructure, where they did not threaten the ship's survival. They nevertheless inflicted significant damage, destroying radar sets, disabling radio systems, and knocking out other systems, leaving the ship in Lee's words "deaf, dumb, blind, and impotent."

Focused on South Dakota, the Japanese left Washington unengaged, allowing her to attack Kirishima without any disruption. South Dakota fired two or three salvos at the next Japanese ship in the line before shifting fire to target Kirishima as well, firing five salvos in total before checking her fire as her gun directing equipment had been disabled; her secondary battery nevertheless kept up a heavy fire. Washington quickly inflicted fatal damage on Kirishima, destroying two of her four main battery turrets, holing her below the waterline, and starting numerous fires. Shortly after midnight, Kondō turned his ships to bring them back into torpedo range, leaving the stricken Kirishima to steam out of control. At 00:05, the Japanese ceased firing at South Dakota and she increased speed to 27 knots (50 km/h; 31 mph) and checked her fire at 00:08. Since her radios had been disabled by gunfire, Gatch could not communicate with Lee, so he turned south and disengaged. A hit below the waterline caused minor flooding and a list of 0.75 degrees, though that was quickly corrected. Fires that shell hits had started were suppressed by 01:55. At around 02:00, South Dakota restored radio contact with Washington and Gatch informed Lee of his ship's condition. Lee ordered Gatch to withdraw at high speed. South Dakota's crew had suffered heavy casualties, with 40 killed and 180 wounded. Among the injured was 12-year-old Calvin Graham, who had lied about his age to enlist; he was the youngest American to fight in the war. By 09:00, South Dakota had formed back up with Washington, Benham, and the destroyer Gwin to withdraw from the area. South Dakota received the Navy Unit Commendation for her role in the battle.

=== Repairs and Atlantic deployment ===
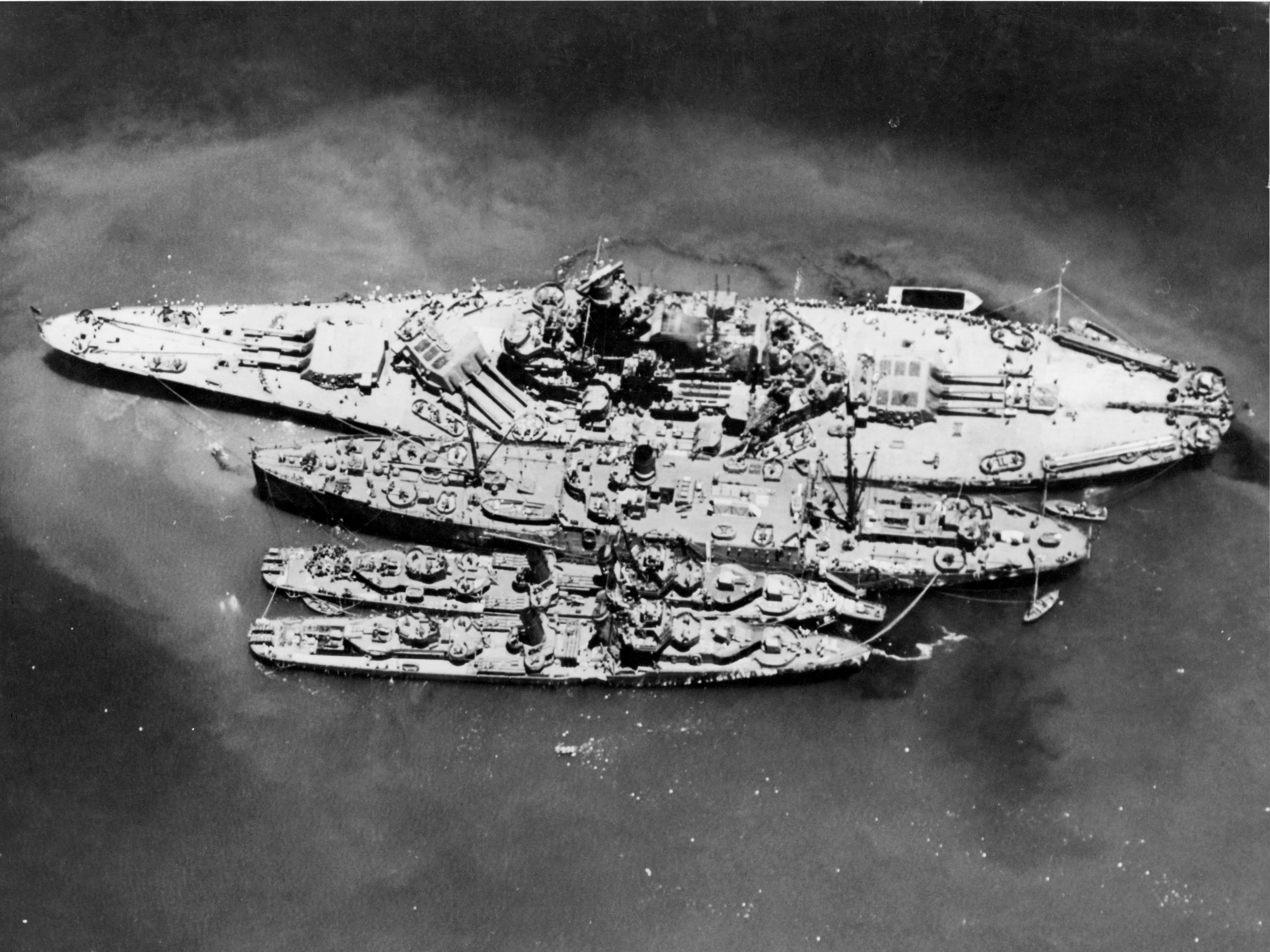
South Dakota tied alongside the repair ship Prometheus after the battle off Guadalcanal

Washington joined South Dakota, and the two battleships withdrew to Nouméa, which they reached on 17 November. There, the repair ship Prometheus repaired some of South Dakota's damage, the work lasting until 25 November. During that period, she received replacements for her destroyed Kingfishers. On 25 November, she got underway, headed to Nukuʻalofa escorted by a pair of destroyers. After refueling there on 27 November, she proceeded with the destroyers until the 29th, when she detached them to return to the fleet. South Dakota steamed northeast to the Panama Canal, which she reached on 11 December. She refueled on the Pacific side of the canal, passed through the locks, and steamed north to New York. Once she was in the Atlantic, she picked up an escort of two destroyers.

After arriving in New York on 18 December, South Dakota went into dry-dock at the Brooklyn Navy Yard for permanent repairs and a refit. The ship was heralded in the press and credited with the victory off Guadalcanal instead of Washington, despite her poor performance in the action. For security purposes, she was referred to as "Battleship X". Captain Lynde D. McCormick relieved Gatch on 1 February 1943, and the ship went to sea on 25 February to begin sea trials. In March, she began operations in the north Atlantic with the carrier Ranger. The British Home Fleet deployed battleships to the Mediterranean to support the Allied invasion of Sicily, and South Dakota was in turn sent to reinforce the Home Fleet. Her primary responsibility during this period was protecting the Arctic supply convoys being sent to the Soviet Union through the Arctic Ocean; a powerful German squadron consisting of the battleships Tirpitz and Scharnhorst and several heavy cruisers threatened these convoys.

The American contribution to the convoy escort was designated TF 61, commanded by RADM Olaf M. Hustvedt, and consisted of South Dakota, her sister Alabama, and five destroyers. The ships arrived in Scapa Flow on 19 May and joined the battleships HMS Anson and Duke of York, with which they frequently operated over the next three months. The ships protected convoys going back and forth between Britain and the Soviet Union, and in July, they conducted a demonstration to distract German attention during the Sicily invasion, though the Germans took no notice of the ships. At the end of the month, South Dakota was recalled to Norfolk with five destroyers as escort; they arrived there on 1 August. After her arrival, RADM Edward Hanson, the commander of BatDiv 9, came aboard South Dakota, making her his flagship.

=== Second tour in the Pacific ===
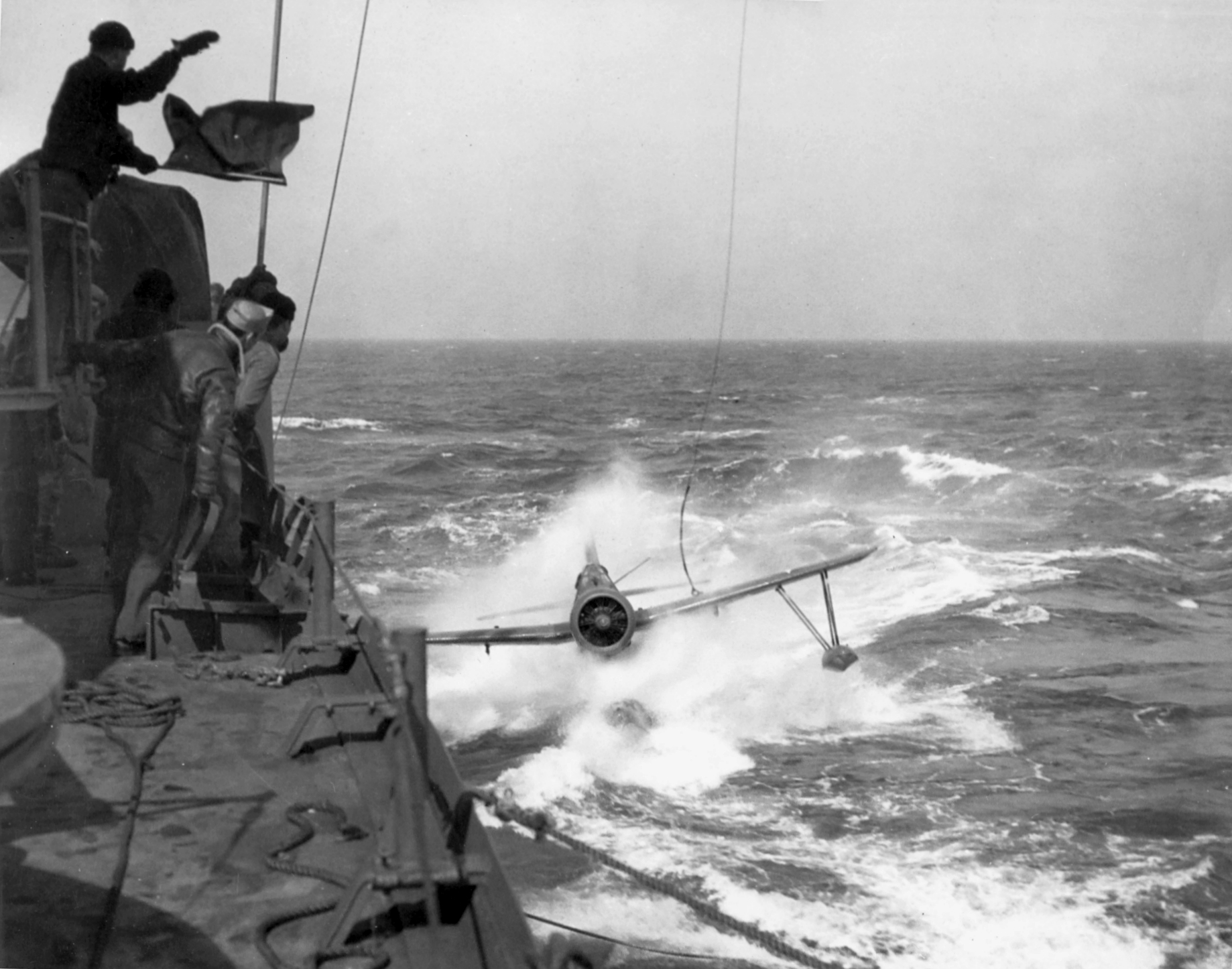
South Dakota's crew preparing to recover a Kingfisher seaplane

==== The Gilbert and Marshall Islands ====
South Dakota departed Norfolk on 21 August and reached Efate in the south Pacific on 14 September. From there, she steamed to Fiji on 7 November, where she joined the rest of BatDiv 9, which had been assigned to the support force for TG 50.1, designated the Carrier Interceptor Group. The American fleet embarked on a campaign to conquer the Gilbert and Marshall Islands, beginning with Operation Galvanic, the seizure of Tarawa later in November. On 19 November, the carriers launched raids on Tarawa and nearby islands in advance of the amphibious assault. South Dakota once again came under the command of Lee in December, who commanded TG 50.4, which also included the battleships Alabama, Washington, North Carolina, and two carriers. The ships were sent to attack Nauru early in the month, and on 6 December they were reinforced by the battleships Indiana and Massachusetts, now being re-designated TG 50.8. The ships arrived off Nauru two days later and bombarded it with gunfire from the battleships and strikes from the carriers' aircraft. The Americans achieved little of significance, as the Japanese forces on the island were light and had few aircraft to be targeted. The ships returned to Efate and began preparations for the next major offensive, including loading ammunition and other supplies. She loaded ammunition from the transport William Ward Burrows on 5 January 1944 and went to sea in company with Indiana and three destroyers for gunnery training on 16 January.

The next operation in which South Dakota participated was the invasion of the Marshalls, code-named Operation Flintlock; South Dakota was now part of TG 37.2, Third Fleet, which included Indiana, Massachusetts, North Carolina, and Washington, escorted by six destroyers. They departed Efate on 18 January, bound for Funafuti. Heavy seas injured several men aboard South Dakota and swept one man overboard, who was not recovered. The ships met the carriers Bunker Hill and Monterey on the way, and on arriving in Funafuti two days later, the group was re-numbered as TF 58.8, as Fifth Fleet had taken command of the fast carrier task force. The ships refueled and departed on 23 January, and on the morning of 25 January, South Dakota, North Carolina, and Alabama were detached to form TG 58.2.2. The fleet continued on to its objective over the next several days, the voyage marked by false submarine sightings and radar contacts. The ships reached Roi-Namur on 29 January, and the carriers launched major air strikes on the islands in preparation for the coming assault. South Dakota remained with the carriers to protect them from Japanese aircraft that did not materialize. On 30 January, South Dakota and the rest of TG 58.2.2 were sent to shell the islands, part of the preparatory bombardment before the ground forces went ashore the following day.

==== Central Pacific raids ====
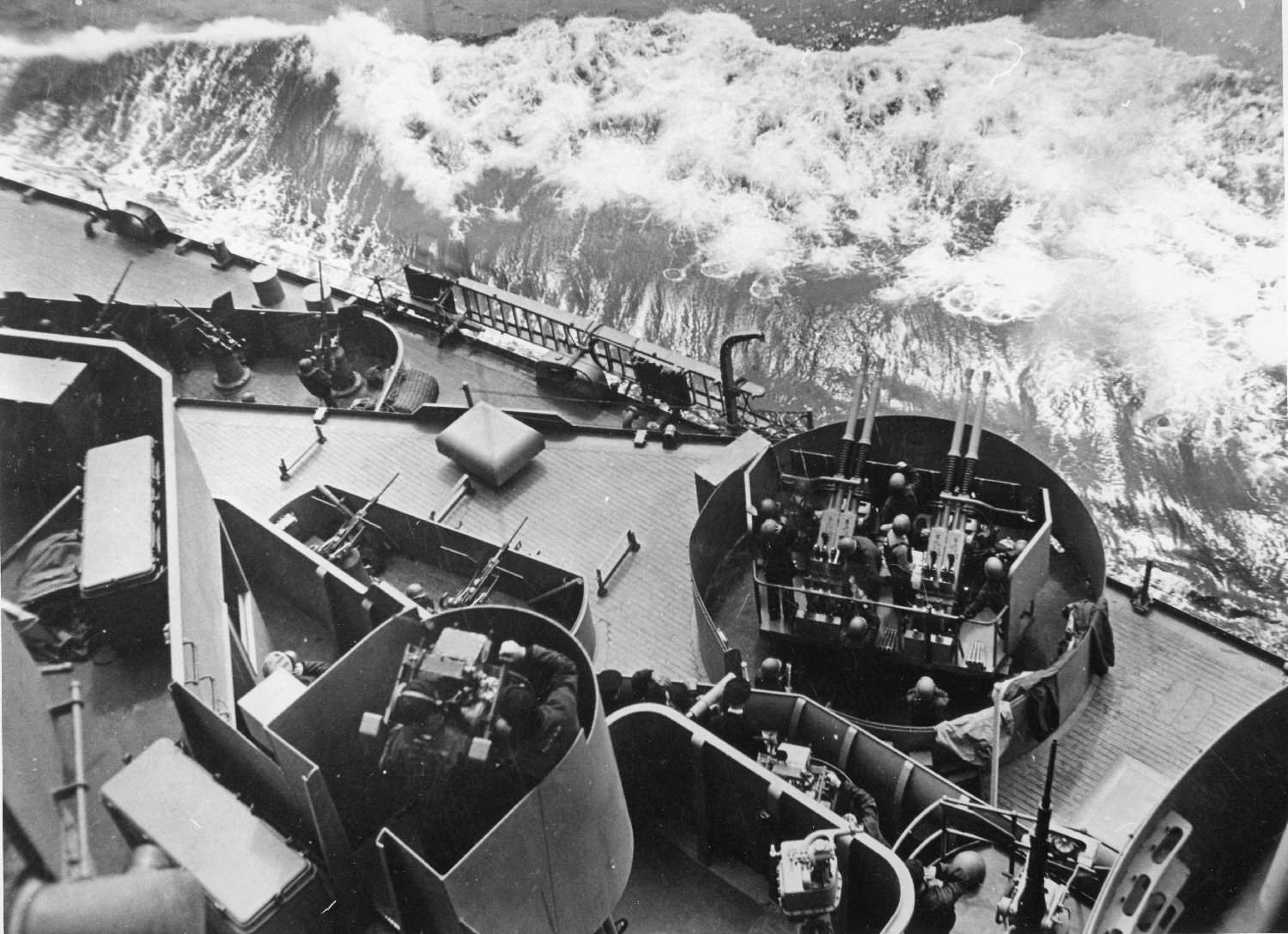
Part of South Dakota's light anti-aircraft armament, including a 40 mm quad mount and numerous 20 mm single mounts

South Dakota steamed to Majuro to replenish fuel and ammunition on 4 February before departing on 12 February to support Operation Hailstone, a raid on the major Japanese naval base in the central Pacific at Truk. The American strikes sank a number of Japanese warships and logistics vessels in the harbor before continuing on to raid Japanese air bases in the Mariana Islands on 20 February. South Dakota's 5-inch gunners engaged Japanese aircraft at long range late on 21 February and into the early hours of 22 February. Heavy anti-aircraft fire from the fleet kept the Japanese aircraft from closing to attack effectively, and South Dakota claimed several aircraft shot down. The American carriers attacked airfields on Saipan, Guam, and Tinian over the next two days, and on 23 February the fleet came under heavy Japanese air strikes. A wave of Mitsubishi G4M land-based bombers struck the fleet and South Dakota shot down at least two of them, one of which had attempted to bomb the ship.

South Dakota, Alabama, and a screen of destroyers were detached from the carrier raiding force to return to TG 58.2; they arrived back in Majuro on 26 February where they refueled and conducted shooting practice over the next month. Fifth Fleet got underway on 22 March for Operation Desecrate One, a series of carrier raids on islands in the western Carolines, including Palau, Yap, Woleai, and Ulithi. The raids were intended to secure the seaward flank for the landing at Hollandia in New Guinea. For the operation, South Dakota was assigned to TG 58.9, which included four other fast battleships, two carriers, three heavy cruisers, and thirteen destroyers; the ships were tasked with screening the main carrier task force to guard against a possible attack by heavy surface elements of the Japanese Combined Fleet, though they encountered no naval opposition.

On 27 March, three carriers and other warships from TG 36.1 joined TG 58.2, which was re-designated 58.3. Late that evening, South Dakota's air search radar picked up Japanese aircraft approaching; in the ensuing battle, South Dakota's gunners could not identify any targets in the darkness and so she did not engage the Japanese aircraft. For their part, the Japanese inflicted no damage on the fleet. The main carrier force began their raids on 30 March, which continued into 1 April. Another Japanese air strike hit the fleet late on the 30th, and this time South Dakota engaged two waves of attackers but did not shoot any down. The carriers inflicted significant losses to Japanese forces in the region at little cost before further operations were interrupted by bad weather that prevented aircraft from being launched. By 6 April, the fleet had returned to Majuro to prepare for the next operation.

Operation Desecrate Two followed the next week; this series of raids targeted Japanese positions along the coast of New Guinea to support the landing at Aitape. While underway on 19 April, South Dakota picked up a Japanese aircraft that was shadowing the fleet and a fighter from the combat air patrol (CAP) was sent to shoot it down. The carriers began their strikes two days later and inflicted serious losses, sinking a number of Japanese vessels in the area and destroying around 130 aircraft in the air or on the ground. Another series of raids followed the next day to support the ground forces fighting ashore. While the fleet withdrew back to Majuro, the carriers hit Truk again on 29 and 30 April, further battering the island. On 1 May, Lee took the fast battleships, including South Dakota, and created TG 58.7, tasked with bombarding the island of Pohnpei. The ships arrived off the island that afternoon and opened fire, quickly suppressing the Japanese anti-aircraft guns that attempted to engage them. South Dakota, Indiana, and North Carolina briefly disengaged to avoid a reported submarine in the area, but after it failed to attack, they returned to their firing positions. There were few targets for the battleships, but the operation provided the crews with experience operating in the bombardment role together. The ships returned to Majuro on 4 May. South Dakota conducted more shooting practice at sea on 15–16 May.

==== The Mariana and Palau Islands ====
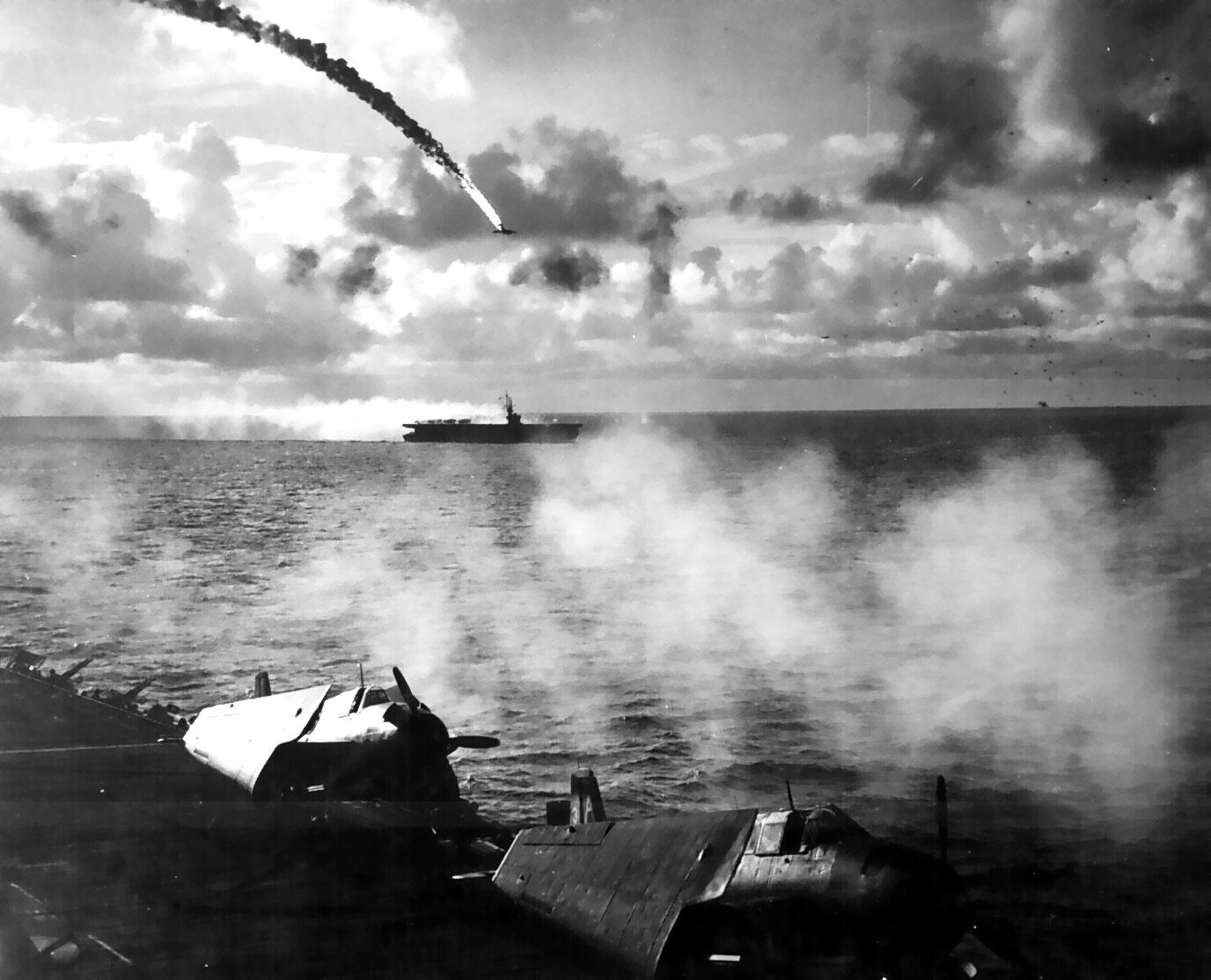
A Japanese plane shot down over the carrier Kitkun Bay

TF 58 sortied on 6 June 1944 to begin Operation Forager, the invasion of the Mariana Islands. South Dakota operated as part of TG 58.7, again under Lee's command. The unit now included six other battleships, four heavy cruisers, and thirteen destroyers. They were again tasked primarily with escorting the fast carrier strike force, providing protection against surface forces and their ample anti-aircraft batteries to defend against hostile aircraft. The carriers began their raids on 11 June and continued for several days. Japanese aircraft launched the first of several counter-attacks later that night and South Dakota used her air search radar to help vector fighters from the CAP to intercept them. As the Japanese made their approach, South Dakota's 5-inch guns opened fire. On 13 June, South Dakota and the other battleships were sent to shell Saipan and Tinian in advance of the arrival of the old battleships of the bombardment group the following day. Japanese artillery attempted to engage them but South Dakota and the other battleships easily outranged them. South Dakota bombarded the area around Tanapag Harbor for some six hours, hitting two transports in the port and starting several fires in the town. The shelling was generally ineffective, however, as the battleships were not sufficiently experienced with shore bombardment, and Japanese defenses were largely undamaged.

On 14 June, South Dakota refueled some of the escorting destroyers and employed her Kingfishers to rescue downed pilots from the carriers. The next day, the marines went ashore on Saipan, a breach of Japan's inner defensive perimeter that triggered the Japanese fleet to launch a major counter-thrust with the 1st Mobile Fleet, the main carrier strike force. While the Japanese were approaching, local counter-attacks from land-based aircraft struck the fleet. The first of these hit on the evening of 15 June, with South Dakota shooting down one of the attackers. The ship refueled the next day, and on 17 June the carriers and escorting battleships left the Saipan area to meet the 1st Mobile Fleet after patrolling submarines had reported its approach through the Philippine Sea. On 18 June, Lee and Admiral Marc Mitscher, the commander of the fast carrier task force, discussed strategies for the coming battle, and Lee decided to deploy his battleships with the carriers to screen them during the anticipated Japanese attack, rather than pursue the Japanese fleet in a night action, as Mitscher suggested.

===== Battle of the Philippine Sea =====
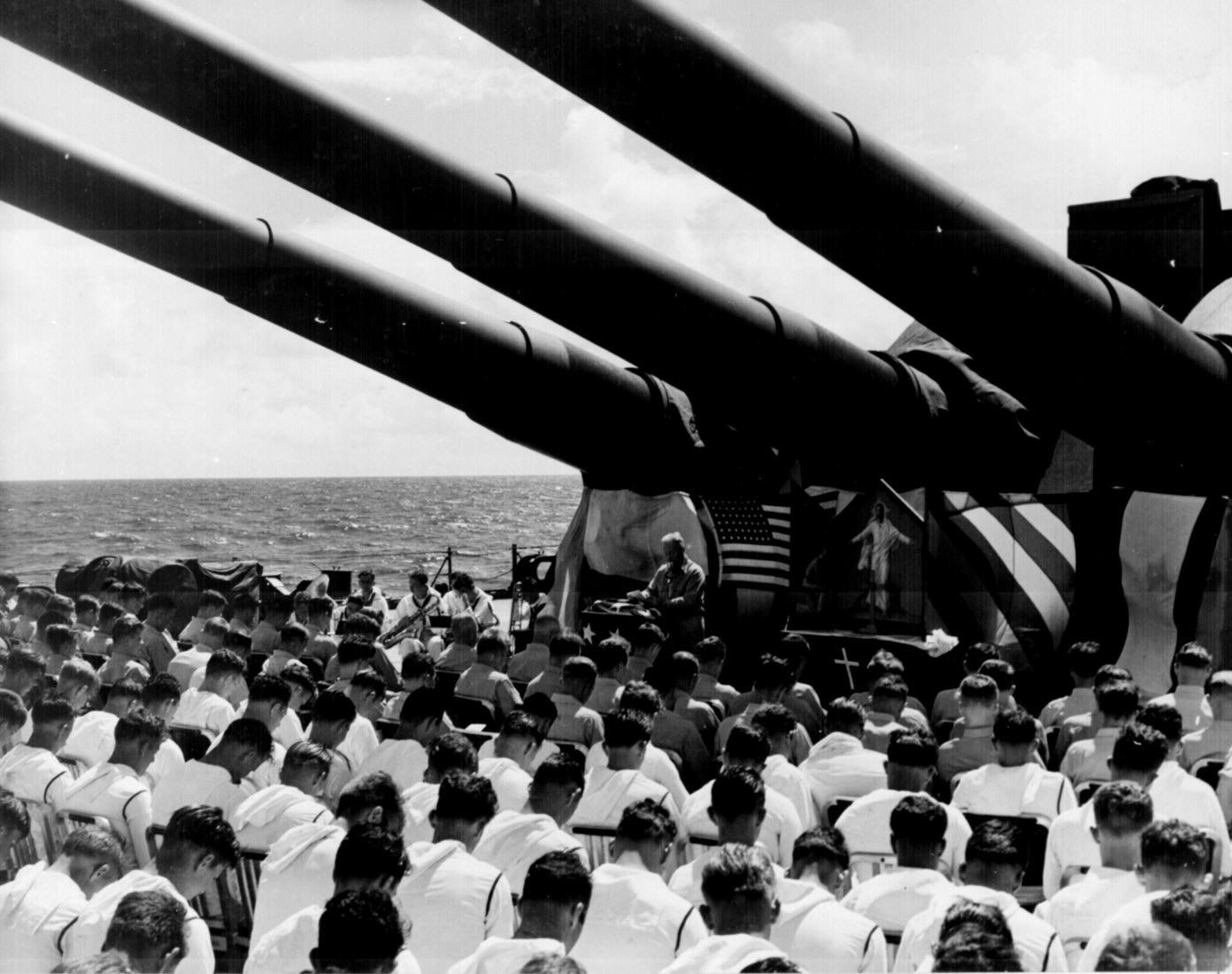
1 July 1944, Chaplain Lindner reads the benediction held in honor of shipmates killed in the air action off Guam

Lee kept his ships steaming in a circle that was 6 nautical miles (11 km; 6.9 mi) in diameter to cover a wide area as the Japanese scouts approached the fleet early on 19 June. South Dakota and the other battleships tracked these aircraft on their air search radars. By 10:04, South Dakota picked up the first wave of strike aircraft inbound and ordered her crew to general quarters. In the ensuing Battle of the Philippine Sea, the CAP fighters engaged the incoming aircraft at 10:43, but Japanese planes broke through and continued on to the fleet. One of these, a Yokosuka D4Y dive-bomber, hit South Dakota with a 500-pound (230 kg) bomb at 10:49, blasting an 8-by-10-foot (2.4 by 3.0 m) hole in the deck, disabling a 40 mm mount, and killing twenty-four and wounding another twenty-seven men. Gun crews claimed to have shot the bomber down, but observers aboard Alabama stated that the plane evaded the fire and escaped.

At 11:50, a second wave of about twenty aircraft punched their way through the CAP. Two Nakajima B6N torpedo bombers attempted to launch their torpedoes at South Dakota, but heavy fire from her and Alabama forced them to break off their runs. Other aircraft targeted South Dakota at around 11:55, but she again emerged unscathed. Third and fourth waves hit the fleet later in the day, but South Dakota was not attacked during these actions. That evening, the men killed in the bomb hit were buried at sea; one of the wounded men succumbed to his injuries the next morning and he was buried as well. The battle continued throughout 20 June, but South Dakota did not see further action. The American strike aircraft had had to fly at extreme range to attack the retreating Japanese fleet, and so many were forced to ditch their aircraft after running out of fuel; South Dakota spent the next morning searching for downed aircrews. During this period, another man who had been wounded by the bomb hit died.

South Dakota turned to the east on 22 June; with the 1st Mobile Fleet having been badly mauled by Mitscher's carrier strike, the invasion fleet off the Marianas was no longer under significant threat and the battleships of TG 58.7 could withdraw from the area. South Dakota was transferred to TG 58.2 and sent to Eniwetok on 23 June, arriving there four days later. From there, she got underway for Puget Sound by way of Pearl Harbor; while in Pearl Harbor on 2 July, she embarked a group of 248 wounded, 279 sailors, and 90 marines to carry them to the mainland. She reached Puget Sound on 10 July and disembarked her passengers and her own wounded crewmen the next day. She was then dry-docked for repairs that evening. The work was completed by 6 August and after being re-floated, she loaded ammunition on 19 August. Sea trials began two days later. She was then assigned to Task Unit (TU) 12.5.1 in company with a pair of destroyers on 25 August, departing for Pearl Harbor, which she reached on the last day of the month.

The ship took part in a series of gunnery exercises off Hawaii from 6 to 8 September, including anti-aircraft shooting and defending against simulated torpedo boat attacks. She replenished fuel and ammunition in Pearl Harbor on 9 September and departed two days later for further maneuvers. During these exercises, she experienced difficulties with her engines; divers inspected the screws and discovered that several of the blades on three of her four propellers were bent or chipped. Instead of participating in the scheduled exercises, she had to return to dry dock in Pearl Harbor for repairs that lasted until 16 September. She resumed training operations that day before getting underway to re-join the fleet on 18 September. TU 12.5.1 initially headed to Seeadler Harbor in Manus Island off New Guinea, but while en route they were redirected to Ulithi, which had recently been seized to serve as the fleet's advance base. They reached their destination on 30 September, by which time Third Fleet had taken operational control of the fast carrier task force.

==== Okinawa and Formosa raids ====
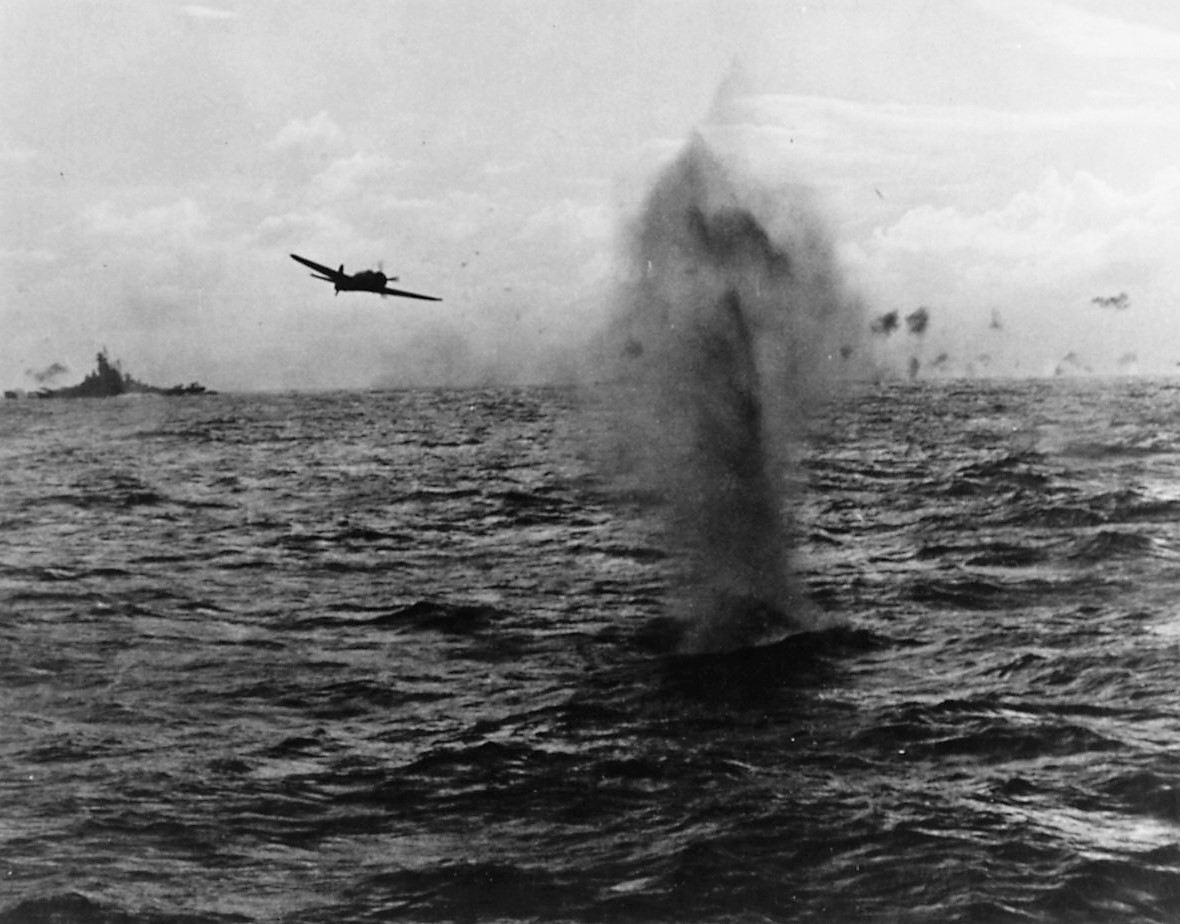
An unidentified South Dakota-class battleship during the Formosa raid, with a B6N flying through the flak

On 3 October, the fleet at Ulithi was forced to go to sea to avoid being caught in harbor by a typhoon that struck that night. After returning to the anchorage the next morning, the stores ship Aldebaran accidentally collided with South Dakota, striking her port side and inflicting only superficial damage. On 5 October, Hanson came back aboard the ship and she resumed her role as the flagship of BatDiv 9. The next day, TF 38, to which BatDiv 9 had been assigned, sortied to embark on the next major operation, a series of carrier raids on Japanese positions in the western Pacific. The fast carrier task force, still under Mitscher's command, steamed north to launch strikes on the Okinawa Islands; they arrived early on the morning of 10 October and began the raid, which sank twenty-nine Japanese vessels in the area. Early the next morning, the battleship Iowa picked up a radar contact at long range and South Dakota confirmed the contact; it turned out to be a G4M bomber shadowing the task force that was shot down by one of the CAP fighters.

After leaving the Okinawa area, Mitscher turned to make a feint toward the Philippines late in the day before turning west toward Formosa, which he attacked in a major raid beginning on 12 October. The aircraft inflicted significant damage to Japanese installations around the island, bombing airfields, factories, and other military facilities and sinking eighteen ships and damaging six more. A G4M dropped chaff to interfere with the fleet's search radars, but the measure was only partially effective and the bomber was shot down. CAP intercepted three waves of bombers, but they were able to approach the fleet much closer before being detected, possibly as a result of the chaff. South Dakota opened fire with her 5-inch guns at 19:03 as the first wave arrived before the target turned away. The second wave reached the fleet about twenty minutes later and South Dakota's gunners engaged it as well. The Japanese air strikes convinced Mitscher to disengage to the east before returning the next morning for another attack. While the Americans were withdrawing, Japanese aircraft repeatedly attacked the ships, though South Dakota initially held her fire since no aircraft approached close enough for her to engage them. At 22:31, she reported shooting down one aircraft, and she kept another group of aircraft at bay with long-range 5-inch fire closer to midnight.

The carriers returned to their strike positions on 13 October, but Japanese aircraft counter-attacked almost immediately, though this first wave was broken up by CAP fighters. Several waves of G4M bombers struck the fleet, torpedoing the cruiser USS Canberra. South Dakota maneuvered at high speed to avoid their torpedoes while engaging the bombers. The American carriers launched another round of strikes the next day to cover the withdrawal of Canberra and her escorts. Later that afternoon, lookouts on South Dakota spotted a wave of seven B6N torpedo bombers approaching the fleet; she opened fire on the two closest aircraft, shooting one of them down. Five more were destroyed by fire from other ships in the area. The fast carrier task force then withdrew to support the invasion of the Philippines.

==== Philippines campaign ====
===== Battle of Leyte Gulf =====
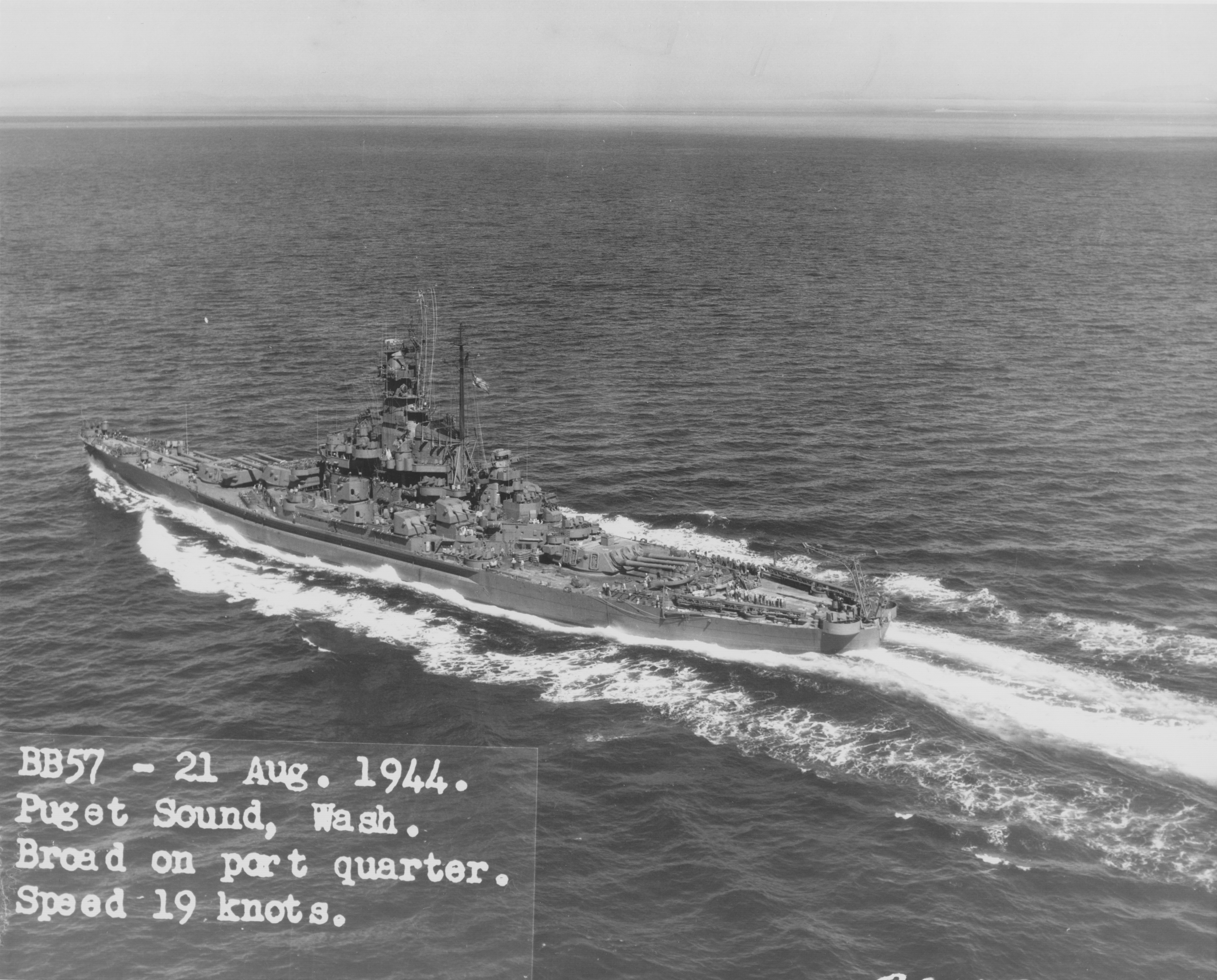
South Dakota underway in August 1944

The landing on Leyte on 17 October triggered the Japanese high command to initiate Operation Shō-Gō 1, a complicated counter-thrust that involved four separate fleets converging on the Allied invasion fleet to destroy it. The 1st Mobile Fleet, now labeled the Northern Force, had been significantly reduced in strength by three years of combat and was intended to serve only as a distraction to lure the American fast carrier task force away from the invasion fleet. Meanwhile, Vice Admiral Takeo Kurita's Center Force would pass through the San Bernardino Strait and attack the invasion fleet. The Americans detected Kurita's approach, however, and the carriers launched a major attack on his fleet while it passed through the Sibuyan Sea. After losing the powerful battleship Musashi in the Battle of the Sibuyan Sea on 24 October, Kurita temporarily reversed course. This convinced Halsey, now the commander of Third Fleet, to send the fast carrier task force to destroy the 1st Mobile Fleet, which had by then been detected.

Later that evening, Commodore Arleigh Burke, Mitscher's Chief of Staff, suggested that Mitscher detach South Dakota and Massachusetts (along with a pair of light cruisers and a destroyer screen) to send them ahead of the carriers to fight a night action with the Northern Force. Mitscher agreed, and at 17:12 ordered RADM Forrest Sherman to put the plan into action. Halsey intervened before Sherman could send the ships north and overruled Mitscher, ordering them to keep the battleships with the main fleet. As Halsey sent Mitscher north to pursue the Japanese carriers, he established TF 34, consisting of South Dakota and five other fast battleships, seven cruisers, and eighteen destroyers, commanded by now Vice Admiral Lee. TF 34 was arrayed ahead of the carriers, serving as their screen.

On the morning of 25 October, Mitscher began his first attack on the Northern Force, initiating the Battle off Cape Engaño; over the course of six strikes on the Japanese fleet, the Americans sank all four carriers and damaged two old battleships that had been converted into hybrid carriers. Unknown to Halsey and Mitscher, Kurita had resumed his approach through the San Bernardino Strait late on 24 October and passed into Leyte Gulf the next morning. While Mitscher was occupied with the decoy Northern Force, Kurita moved in to attack the invasion fleet; in the Battle off Samar, he was held off by a group of escort carriers, destroyers, and destroyer escorts, TU 77.4.3, known as Taffy 3. Frantic calls for help later that morning led Halsey to detach Lee's battleships to head south and intervene. However, Halsey waited more than an hour after receiving orders from Admiral Chester W. Nimitz, the Commander, U.S. Pacific Fleet, to detach TF 34; still steaming north during this interval, the delay added two hours to the battleships' voyage south. A need to refuel destroyers further slowed TF 34's progress south.

Heavy resistance from Taffy 3 threw Kurita's battleships and cruisers into disarray and led him to break off the attack before South Dakota and the rest of TF 34 could arrive. Halsey detached the battleships Iowa and New Jersey as TG 34.5 to pursue Kurita through the San Bernardino Strait while Lee took the rest of his ships further southwest to try to cut off his escape, but both groups arrived too late. The historian H. P. Wilmott speculated that had Halsey detached TF 34 promptly and not delayed the battleships by refueling the destroyers, the ships could have easily arrived in the strait ahead of Center Force and, owing to the marked superiority of their radar-directed main guns, destroyed Kurita's ships. South Dakota refueled at sea on 26 October before in turn refueling a pair of destroyers two days later. She refueled another two destroyers on 30 October, though the process was temporarily interrupted by the appearance of a G4M. On 1 November, South Dakota was transferred to BatDiv 6, though Hanson remained aboard the ship until her replacement, the new battleship Wisconsin, arrived later that month. South Dakota withdrew to Ulithi the following day.

===== Later operations =====
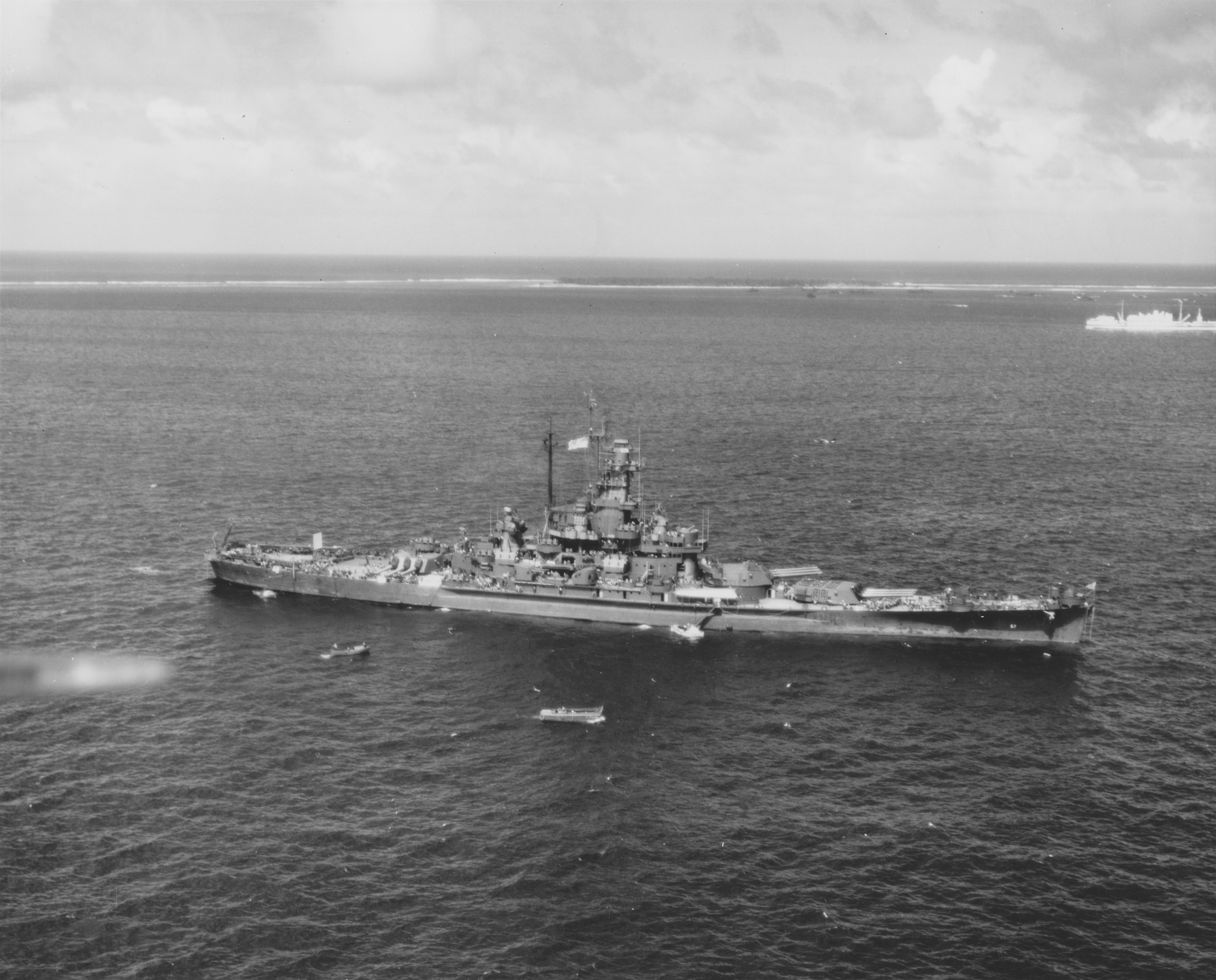
South Dakota in Ulithi in December 1944

Immediately on arrival in Ulithi on 2 November, South Dakota sortied as part of TG 38.1, tasked with supporting ground forces ashore on Leyte that had encountered heavy Japanese resistance. On 4 November, South Dakota was transferred to TG 38.3 to support a group of four carriers launching strikes on Luzon the next day. The group came under air attack on the afternoon of 5 November; errant rounds from other ships accidentally killed a man and wounded seven more aboard South Dakota during the action. Another wave of aircraft approached the following morning, prompting the fleet to assume a defensive formation. The Japanese planes did not attack, however, and the fleet returned to its cruising formation. South Dakota spent the next several days refueling destroyers and replenishing her own fuel bunkers. The carriers launched another series of raids on 13 and 14 November before withdrawing to Ulithi, arriving on 17 November.

The next day Hanson transferred to Wisconsin and Lee, who was by now the Commander Battleships, Pacific Fleet, came aboard the ship, making her his flagship. South Dakota and the rest of TG 38.3 sortied on 22 November. The unit by this time consisted of two fleet and two light carriers, South Dakota and the two North Carolina-class battleships, three cruisers, and two destroyer squadrons. Most of the ships conducted gunnery training while the carriers conducted strikes independently against targets in the Philippines over the next three days. South Dakota spent the rest of the month taking part in anti-aircraft training and refueling destroyers. She arrived back in Ulithi on 2 December, where the crew made repairs and loaded ammunition and stores for future operations.

On 11 December, TG 38.3 departed Ulithi to join the rest of TF 38 for an assault on the island of Mindoro; the purpose of the operation was to seize a large airfield that could be used to support the invasion of Luzon. The carriers began a series of strikes on airfields on Luzon on 14 December to destroy or otherwise prevent Japanese aircraft there from interfering with the landing on Mindoro. The American raids continued over the next several days and significantly degraded the remaining strength of Japanese air forces in the Philippines. Late in the day on 17 December, Typhoon Cobra swept through the area, battering the fleet, sinking three destroyers, and inflicting serious damage to several other vessels, though South Dakota emerged relatively unscathed. The damage inflicted on the fleet delayed further support of ground troops for two days and the continuing bad weather led Halsey to break off operations; the ships arrived back in Ulithi on 24 December.

TF 38 refueled over the next several days and embarked on another raid on Formosa on 3–4 January 1945, but bad weather hampered flight operations and Halsey broke off the operation, having achieved little. The ships returned to the Philippines and made repeated strikes on Lingayen over the course of 6 and 7 January in preparation for the next landing, particularly targeting the airfields being used by the kamikaze suicide aircraft. The ships then entered the South China Sea on 10 January and refueled before conducting a further series of strikes against various targets in the region, including Formosa on 21 January and the Ryuku Islands the following day.

==== Battles of Iwo Jima and Okinawa ====
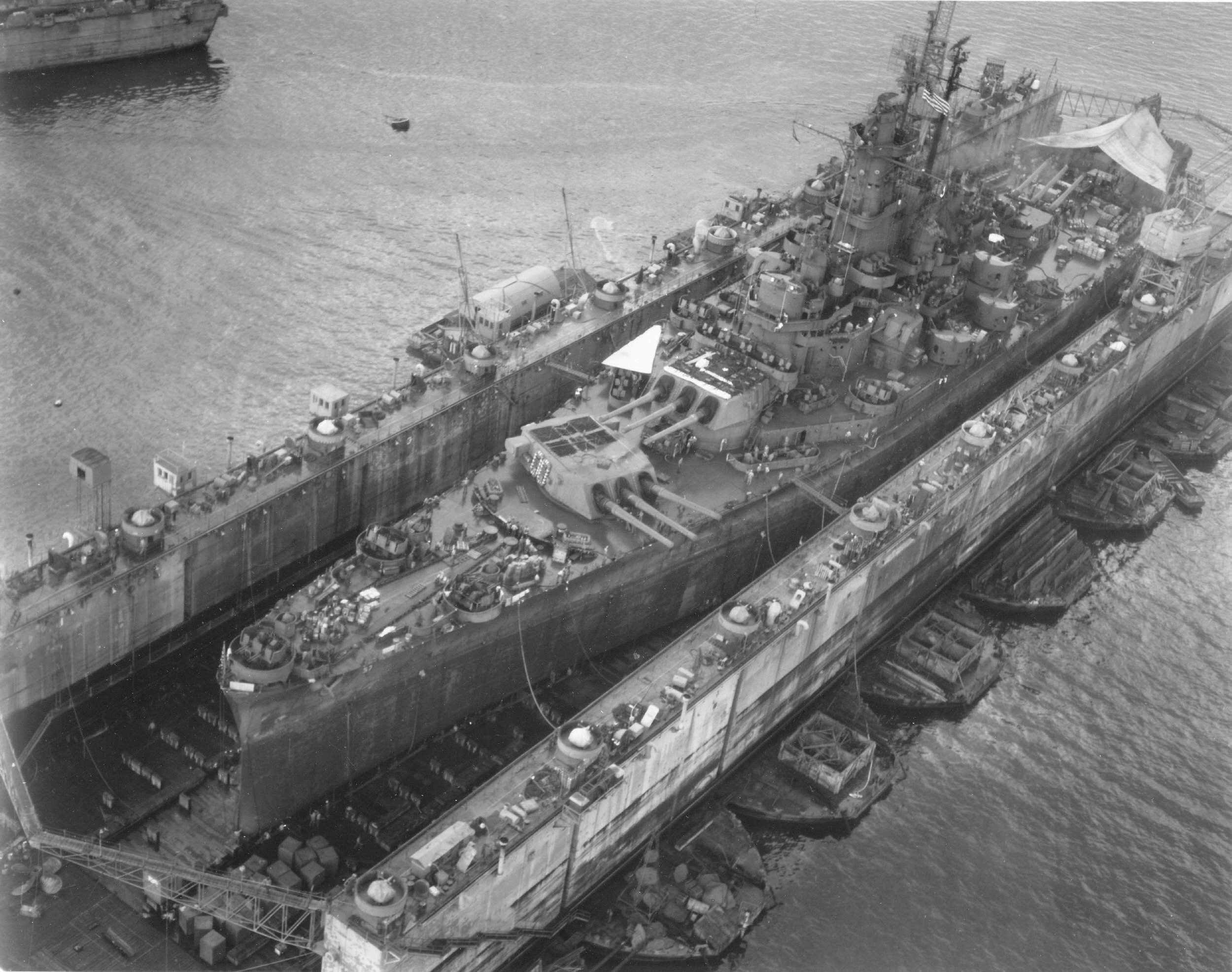
South Dakota aboard the auxiliary floating drydock ABSD-3

By early February, Fifth Fleet had resumed control of the fast carrier task force and South Dakota was transferred to TG 58.3, along with New Jersey, the large cruiser Alaska, and several other warships. The fleet carriers conducted a series of air strikes on Japan, targeting the Tokyo area on 17 February, but bad weather made it difficult for the aircraft to operate. The ships of TG 58.3 were then sent to reinforce the invasion fleet during the Battle of Iwo Jima from 19 to 22 February. The carriers made repeated strikes as the marines went ashore on the first day of the landing. The ships of TF 58 were then recalled for another series of raids on Japan, targeting Tokyo on 25 February; planned attacks on Kobe and Nagoya were cancelled due to poor weather.

The fleet then returned to Ulithi to replenish ammunition and fuel before embarking on another raid of Japan in mid-March. The carriers struck Kyushu on 18 March while the battleships continue their air defense role. Four days later, having inflicted serious damage on airfields and several warships in Kure, the task force withdrew to refuel. The following day, air strikes to prepare Okinawa for assault began, interrupted by the need to disengage and refuel on 28–29 March. The initiation of major attacks on the island, a clear indicator of an impending amphibious assault, led the Japanese to begin a serious, concentrated kamikaze campaign against the fleet, damaging numerous vessels but not seriously impeding the Allies' progress. Over the coming weeks, the task groups of TF 58 rotated through the waters off Okinawa, two groups at a time, to allow the other groups to replenish fuel and ammunition and repair battle damage. Throughout the maelstrom off Okinawa, South Dakota emerged without having been hit by any of the kamikazes.

On 19 April, South Dakota was detached from the carriers to join a shore bombardment group sent to support a major offensive by XXIV Army Corps against Japanese defensive positions in southern Okinawa, though they made little progress. The ships of TF 58 then departed for a raid on the Sakishima Islands before withdrawing to Leyte. After replenishing there, the task groups resumed their rotations off Okinawa for the next week. On 6 May, South Dakota was replenishing ammunition from the ammunition ship USS Wrangell when a tank of propellant for the 16 in (410 mm) guns exploded. The blast detonated four more tanks and caused a serious fire, forcing the crew to flood the magazine for turret number 2 to avoid a catastrophic explosion. Three men were killed by the explosion and eight more were seriously wounded and later died; another twenty-four were less-seriously injured in the accident.

South Dakota was detached from TG 58.4 for repairs at Ulithi on 13 May in company with a pair of escorting destroyers, arriving there the next day. She entered the auxiliary floating drydock ABSD-3 to be inspected. The ship's propellers, shafts, and strut bearings all had worn badly and suffered from pitting. These were repaired and she was refloated on 27 May; during this period, Third Fleet resumed command of the fast carrier task force, reverting all subordinate unit designations to the 30-series. Two days later, South Dakota went to sea to begin anti-submarine training with a pair of destroyers. Further combat practice, including main-battery and anti-aircraft gunnery practice and night combat training, continued over the next several days, during which time the ship crossed the Philippine Sea to Leyte Gulf. A reorganization of TF 38 saw South Dakota reassigned to TG 38.1 on 16 June, the same day she became the flagship of RADM John F. Shafroth Jr. The ship took part in more anti-aircraft training from 23 to 24 June.

==== Bombardments of Japan ====
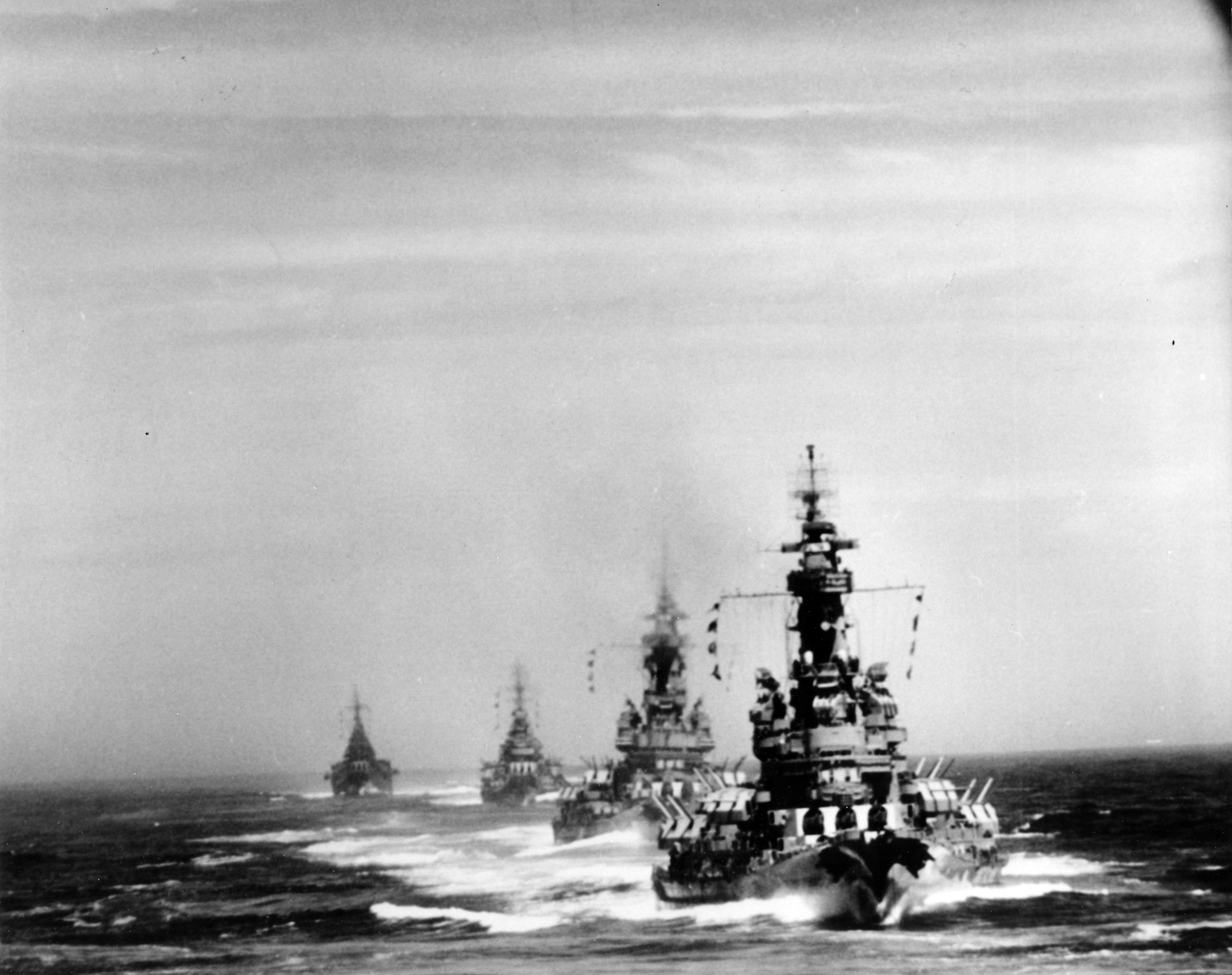
Task Unit 38.18.1, photographed from South Dakota, approaching Kamaishi

With Okinawa in Allied hands, preparations were beginning for Operation Olympic, the invasion of Kyushu. TF 38 sortied from Leyte on 1 July to begin a series of strikes on targets in Japan to deplete Japanese forces in the Home Islands. While en route, South Dakota kept several destroyers fueled before the fleet arrived off the coast of Japan on 10 July. The carriers began their raids that day, though the Japanese had anticipated the attacks and had dispersed and camouflaged their aircraft, holding them back for the eventual landing instead of losing them prematurely. As a result, the carrier aircraft found few Japanese planes to destroy over the next several days. On 14 July, South Dakota was assigned to TU 38.8.1 with Indiana, Massachusetts, two heavy cruisers, and nine destroyers. The battleships were then sent to bombard the town of Kamaishi to destroy the Kamaishi Steel Works, but the mountainous terrain made targeting the facility difficult. This was the first time that Japan came under bombardment by capital ships during the war. Despite their difficulty in observing the effects of their shooting, in the course of six passes, the battleships inflicted what was later estimated to have been a two-and-a-half-month interruption in coke production and a one-month disruption of pig iron manufacture.

The battleships then returned to their positions with TF 38 and covered them during air strikes on Honshu and Hokkaido on 15 July. Further reinforced by the British Pacific Fleet, the Allied fleet struck targets around Tokyo on 17 July, sinking or damaging several warships in the area. Over the course of 20 through 22 July, South Dakota replenished fuel, ammunition, and other supplies at sea. Additional carrier strikes were made from 24 to 28 July, inflicting further losses to the remnants of the Japanese fleet; the battleships Haruna, Ise, and Hyuga were all sunk at their moorings, along with a number of cruisers, destroyers, and other warships. TU 38.8.1 was re-formed on 29 July to bombard Hamamatsu; this time, South Dakota, Indiana, and Massachusetts were reinforced by the British TU 37.1.2, centered on the battleship King George V, and they were covered by CAP fighters from the carrier Bon Homme Richard. The battleships opened fire shortly before midnight on 29 July and continued firing into the early hours of the 30th.

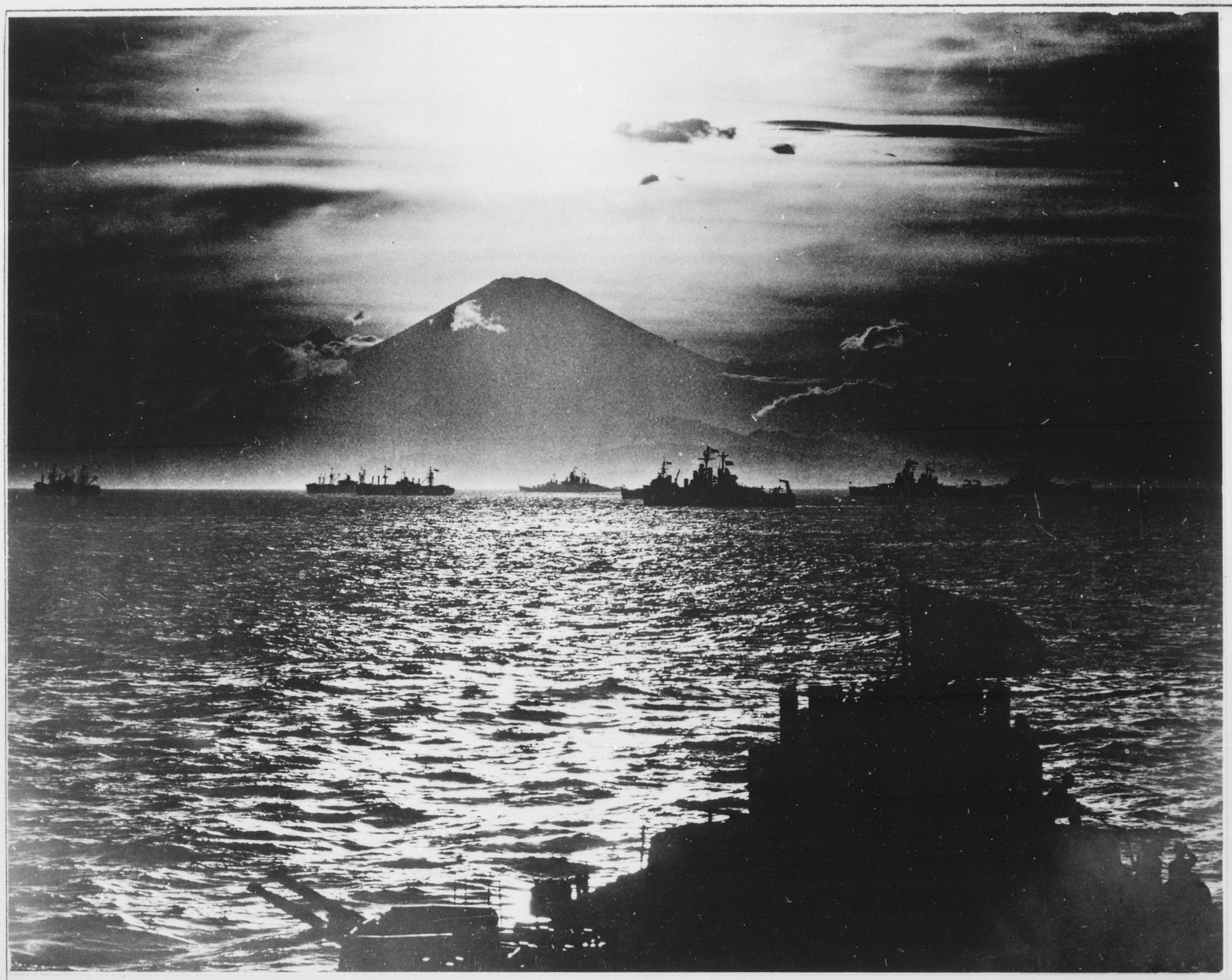
August 1945, Mount Fuji, Japan, as seen from South Dakota in Tokyo Bay

The ships withdrew shortly after ceasing fire with South Dakota in the lead of the formation. The task unit was again dissolved later that morning and South Dakota returned to TG 38.1, which thereafter resumed launching air strikes on the Tokyo and Nagoya areas. Another typhoon threatened the fleet, but Halsey steered the ships out of its way on 31 July and 1 August. South Dakota refueled on 3 August and the carriers launched simulated strikes on the fleet for anti-aircraft training two days later. South Dakota again replenished her fuel bunkers on 7 August before re-forming TU 34.8.1 for a third bombardment mission on 9 August. This time, the unit consisted of South Dakota, six Allied cruisers and ten Allied destroyers. South Dakota shelled Kamaishi that afternoon for a period of about an hour and a half before disengaging. As the ships withdrew, a single Japanese plane attacked them but evaded all fire from the ships and escaped. South Dakota returned to TG 38.1 and supported the carriers during further strikes on airfields later that day and on the 10th. Shafroth transferred to Alabama on 12 August and South Dakota was reassigned to TG 38.3 the next morning.

==== End of the war ====
TF 38 carriers had already launched aircraft on the morning of 15 August when Halsey received word that the Japanese had agreed to surrender unconditionally. The aircraft were recalled and South Dakota received the order to cease offensive operations at 06:58. Problems communicating their surrender to all subordinate units led to some Japanese aircraft launching attacks on the fleet later that day, but they were all shot down by CAP aircraft. South Dakota spent the next several days refueling and replenishing ammunition before steaming to Sagami Wan on 27 August as part of the initial occupation of Japan. Two days later, she moved to Tokyo Bay; that afternoon, Halsey and Nimitz came aboard the ship. Halsey left later in the day, but Nimitz remained until he left for the battleship Missouri, where the formal surrender ceremony took place on 2 September. Nimitz returned later that day before departing for Guam on 3 September and South Dakota came alongside Missouri to transfer Halsey and his staff to the ship. South Dakota thereafter served as Halsey's flagship while he directed the initial stages of the occupation.

Halsey remained aboard until 20 September when he left to return to Pearl Harbor. South Dakota got underway that afternoon in company with numerous other warships for the voyage back to the United States. South Dakota stopped in Buckner Bay in Okinawa on 23 September and then resumed her journey across the Pacific the next morning with some 600 sailors, soldiers, and marines aboard. The ships passed Hawaii and thereafter dispersed to different ports; South Dakota entered San Francisco on 27 October, with Halsey once again aboard for Navy Day celebrations. Governor Earl Warren boarded the ship for the ceremonies. Two days later, she steamed down to San Pedro, California.

=== Post-war ===
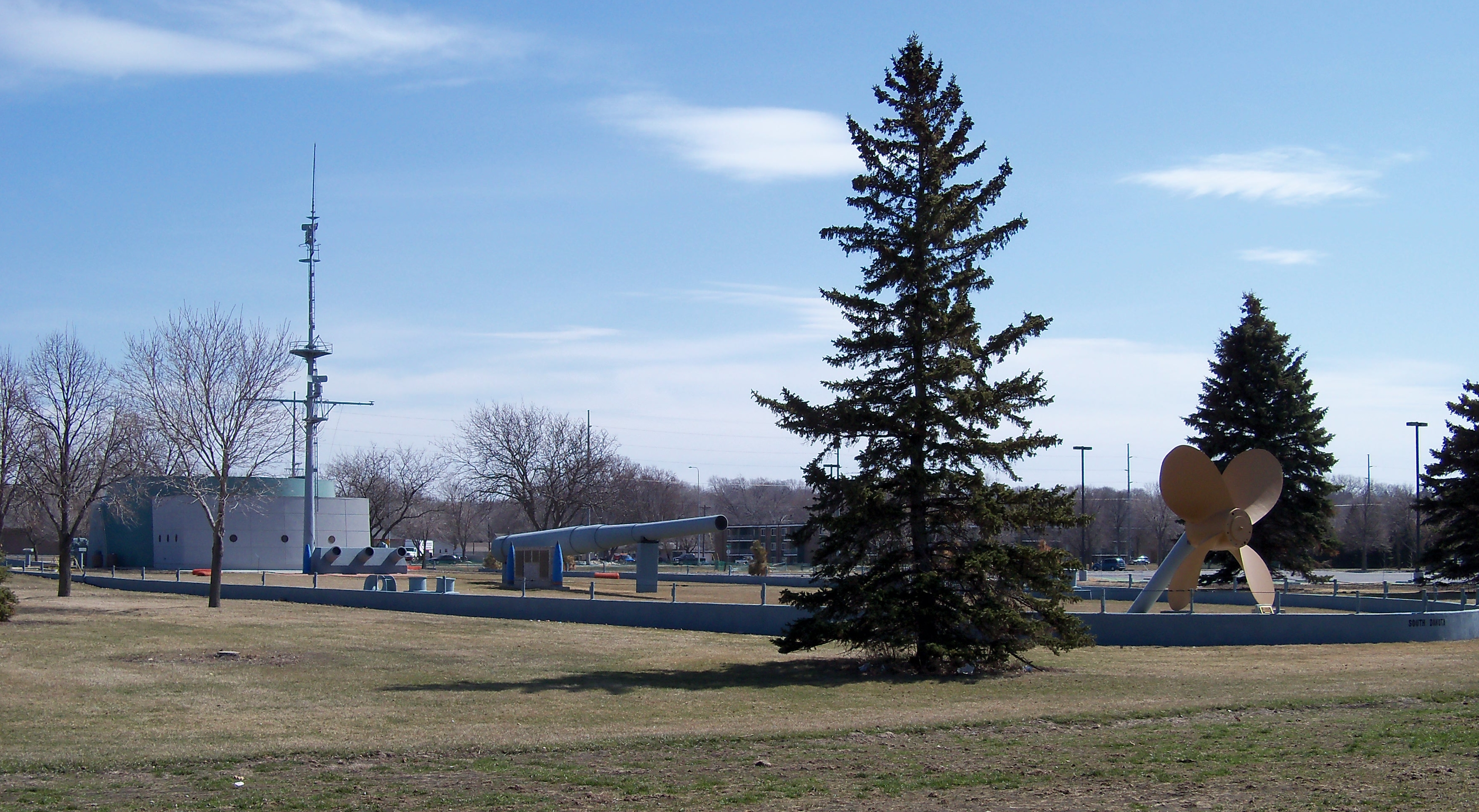
The USS South Dakota memorial in Sioux Falls, South Dakota

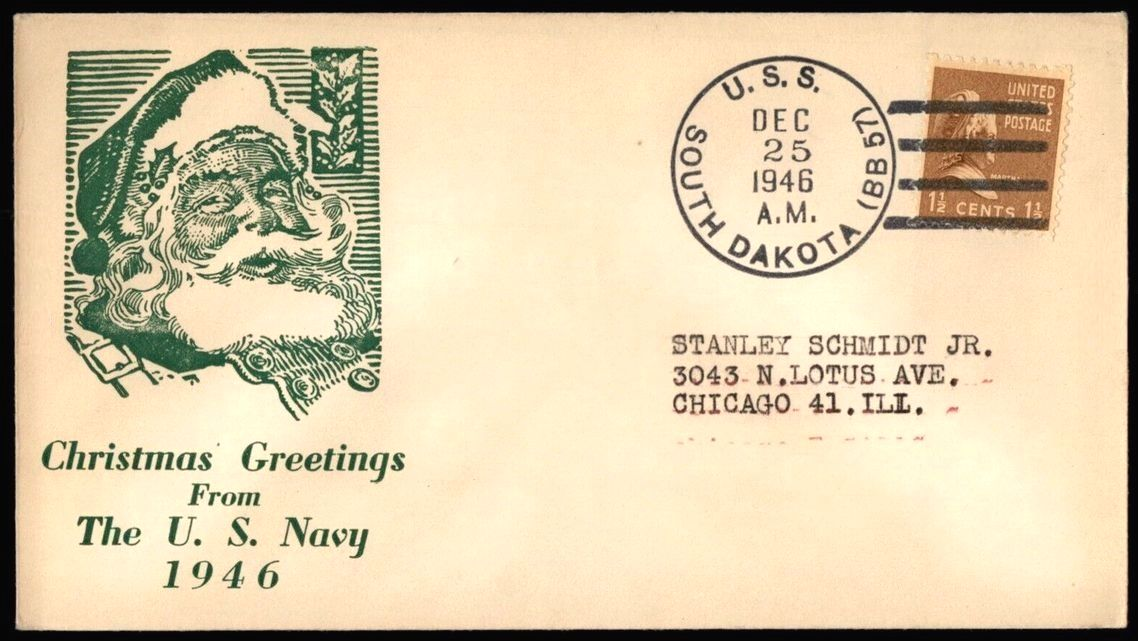
Official Naval Postmark and cachet USS South Dakota, 25 December 1946

On 3 January 1946, South Dakota got underway for the Atlantic; she steamed south and transited the Panama Canal a final time and steamed north to the Philadelphia Navy Yard, arriving there on 20 January. She then underwent an overhaul in preparation for deactivation. A month later on 21 February, RADM Thomas R. Cooley hoisted his flag aboard the ship, making her the flagship of the Fourth Fleet, a reserve unit. Cooley's tenure aboard the ship was brief and he was replaced by Vice Admiral Charles H. McMorris just five days later. On 3 July, McMorris transferred his flag to the heavy cruiser Oregon City and the Navy dissolved the Fourth Fleet on 1 January 1947. South Dakota was decommissioned on 31 January and laid up in the Atlantic Reserve Fleet.

Plans were drawn up during the period she was in reserve to modernize South Dakota and the other ships of her class should they be needed for future active service. In March 1954, a program to equip the four ships with secondary batteries consisting of ten twin 3-inch (76 mm) guns were proposed, but the plan came to nothing. Another plan to convert the ship into a guided missile battleship arose in 1956–1957, but the cost of the conversion proved to be prohibitive. She would have had all three main battery turrets removed and replaced with a twin RIM-8 Talos missile launcher forward, two RIM-24 Tartar launchers aft, anti-submarine weapons, and equipment to handle helicopters. The cost of the project amounted to $120 million.

The ship remained in the Navy's inventory for another fifteen years before being stricken from the Naval Vessel Register on 1 June 1962. South Dakota was sold to the Lipsett Division of Luria Brothers and Co. to be broken up for scrap on 25 October. Tugboats towed her from Philadelphia in November to Kearny, New Jersey to be dismantled. Some parts of the ship were retained through the efforts of the Sioux Falls Chamber of Commerce, and they were installed in a memorial to the ship in the city on 7 September 1969. The memorial consists of a low concrete wall built in the outline of the ship in full scale, and artifacts from the ship, including an anchor, a simulated gun turret, and a 16-inch gun are displayed in the outline. A museum was erected in the center of the outline, and it displays other artifacts, including her bell, sailors' uniforms, a scale model of South Dakota, and various other displays. Additional artifacts from the ship are preserved at the National Museum of the United States Navy, including one of South Dakota's screws and a section of armor plate. Both items are on display in Willard Park.
