= USS Prometheus (AR-3) =

Repair ship of the United States Navy

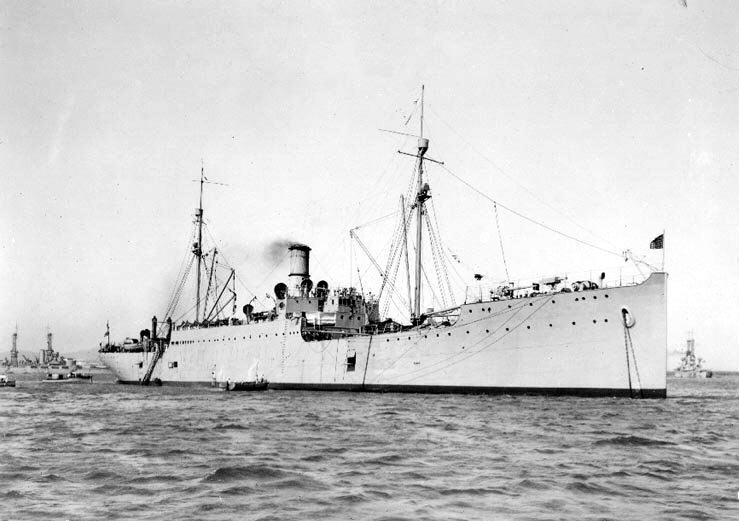
- USS Prometheus (Fleet Repair Ship No. 2) at Guantánamo Bay, Cuba in January 1920. Note the battleships in the background.

History

United States
- Name: USS Ontario (Fleet Collier No. 2)
- Builder: Mare Island Navy Yard
- Laid down: 18 October 1907
- Launched: 5 December 1908
- Commissioned: 15 January 1910
- Decommissioned: 7 April 1913
- Fate: Converted to a repair ship
- Name: USS Prometheus (Repair Ship No. 2)
- Commissioned: 23 December 1914
- Decommissioned: 4 October 1924
- Recommissioned: 15 May 1942
- Decommissioned: 1 July 1946
- Stricken: 31 July 1946
- Fate: Sold, 29 August 1950

General characteristics
- Type: Repair ship
- Displacement: 8,940 long tons (9,083 t)
- Length: 466 ft 4 in (142.14 m)
- Beam: 60 ft 2 in (18.34 m)
- Draft: 19 ft 6 in (5.94 m)
- Speed: 16 knots (30 km/h; 18 mph)
- Complement: 737
- Armament: 2 × single 5"/38 caliber guns dual-purpose mounts; 4 × 3"/50 caliber guns; 4 × 40 mm guns

Service record
- Operations: World War I; World War II
- Awards: 1 Battle star (WWII)

USS Prometheus (AR-3) was a repair ship that served the United States Navy during World War I and World War II. Named after Greek mythology figure Prometheus, she was originally laid down as a collier on 18 October 1907 at the Mare Island Navy Yard, Vallejo, California; launched on 5 December 1908; and commissioned 15 January 1910 as USS Ontario (Fleet Collier No. 2).

== Service history ==
=== 1910–1924 ===
Ontario served with a merchant complement until she decommissioned on 7 April 1913 to undergo conversion to a repair ship. After conversion, she recommissioned 23 December 1914 as USS Prometheus (Repair Ship No. 2). After a cruise to Alaskan waters in 1915, she was assigned to duty with the Atlantic Fleet, 16 May 1916 operating out of Norfolk, Virginia and bound for Bermuda, remaining there until 29 January 1918. While at Bermuda she was ordered to join the Naval forces at Brest, France to provide repair services, and she did a commendable job until she sailed on 16 January 1919 for New York City. Upon arrival at New York she was assigned to Battleship Force 1 for duty in conjunction with the upkeep of vessels engaged in overseas transportation of troops. She was classified as AR-3 on 17 July 1920.

Prometheus sailed from New York on 1 September 1920 with orders to tow the USS Connecticut (BB-18), disabled at Cuba, to Philadelphia. For her performance in this assignment she was commended by the Commander-in-Chief, Atlantic Fleet. Prometheus made additional cruises to Cuba in 1921 and 1923 while operating with the Atlantic Fleet. Prometheus transferred to the west coast early in 1923, arriving at San Pedro, Los Angeles on 17 April. She operated along the Pacific coast as far north as Washington, until she decommissioned on 4 October 1924 at Bremerton.

=== 1942–1946 ===
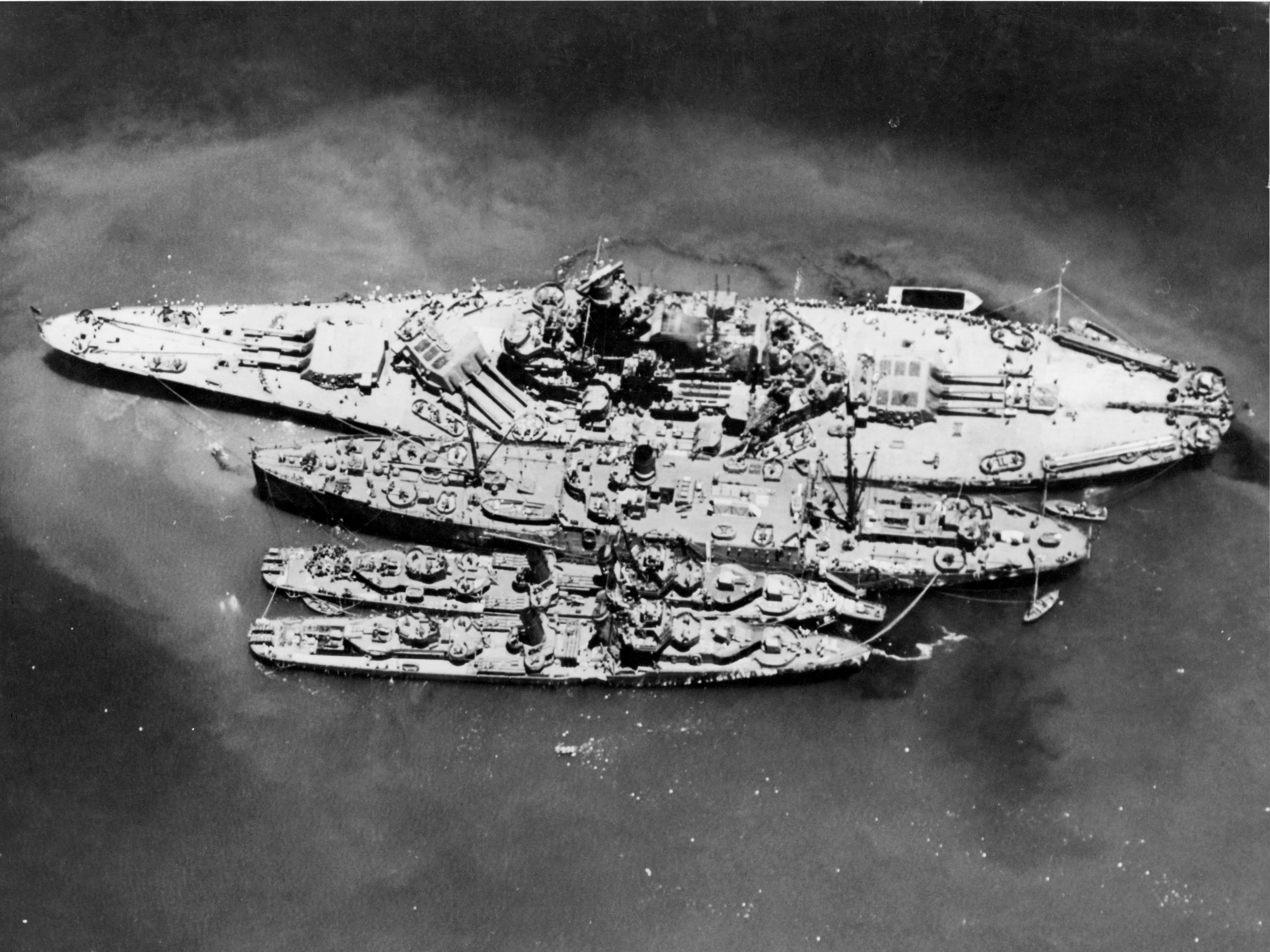
Prometheus repairs the battleship South Dakota and two destroyers, November 1942

Prometheus recommissioned on 15 May 1942 at the Bremerton Navy Yard and following shakedown, she sailed from San Francisco, California on 9 August for Pearl Harbor, Hawaii where she took in tow the drydock ARD–2 and proceeded to Nouméa, New Caledonia. She rendered repair services from the largest warship, the USS South Dakota (BB-57), to the smallest amphibious craft, which were beginning to figure so prominently in the island-hopping campaign towards the Japanese home islands. Her only breaks, from a steady demand of hard work from her crew, came on infrequent trips to Sydney, Australia. Following the push westward across the Pacific, Prometheus moved in the spring of 1944 from San Francisco to Tulagi, and after a month's stay there, where she catered primarily to escort carriers, she went to Florida Island and then in September to Manus. She received orders on 25 September to proceed to Kossol Passage, Palau Islands where she came under enemy fire for the first time from a Japanese midget sub. She opened fire with her 3"/50 caliber deck gun and sunk the sub. She and her crew suffered no damage.

Prometheus departed Kossol on 21 January 1945 and moved to the now famous Ulithi anchorage to help ready the Fleet for the Iwo Jima campaign and the Okinawa strikes. By 19 February she had moved again to San Pedro Bay, Leyte to ready ships for the take-over invasion of Okinawa. Though her main responsibility was to repair ships and craft of the Amphibious Force, she gained wide acclaim for the excellence of repairs and alterations made to the USS Texas (BB-35) and USS Colorado (BB-45) in the Philippines.

War's end found the old repair ship at Guiuan, Samar in the process of commissioning the cargo ship Justin, formerly the SS Gus Darnell, which required bomb damage repair and alterations to fit her for Navy service during the occupation period ahead. Prometheus continued her rigorous schedule at Okinawa and Hong Kong during the Asian occupation, returning to San Francisco at the year's end. At San Francisco she performed decommissioning work on vessels sent there for disposal until she, herself, decommissioned on 1 July 1946.

=== Decommissioning and sale ===
Prometheus was delivered to the WSA and simultaneously to the Maritime Commission Reserve Fleet for lay up on 16 July at Puget Sound, Washington. She was struck from the Naval Vessel Register on 31 July. By 26 August 1949 she had been completely stripped, and she was sold on 29 August 1950 to Zidell Shipwrecking Company and subsequently scrapped.

Prometheus earned one battle star for Pacific service in World War II.

== See also ==
- List of auxiliaries of the United States Navy
