= HM LST-421 =

1942 LST-1-class tank landing ship

History

United Kingdom
- Name: LST-421
- Ordered: as a Type S3-M-K2 hull, MCE hull 941
- Builder: Bethlehem-Fairfield Shipyard, Baltimore, Maryland
- Yard number: 2193
- Laid down: 11 November 1942
- Launched: 5 December 1942
- Commissioned: 26 January 1943
- Decommissioned: 29 November 1946
- Identification: Hull symbol: LST-421
- Fate: Returned to USN custody, 29 November 1946

United States
- Name: LST-421
- Acquired: 29 November 1946
- Stricken: 1 August 1947
- Fate: Sold for conversion to merchant service, 7 October 1947

General characteristics
- Class & type: LST-1-class tank landing ship
- Displacement: 4,080 long tons (4,145 t) full load; 2,160 long tons (2,190 t) landing
- Length: 328 ft (100 m) oa
- Beam: 50 ft (15 m)
- Draft: Full load: 8 ft 2 in (2.49 m) forward; 14 ft 1 in (4.29 m) aft; Landing at 2,160 t: 3 ft 11 in (1.19 m) forward; 9 ft 10 in (3.00 m) aft
- Installed power: 2 × 900 hp (670 kW) Electro-Motive Diesel 12-567A diesel engines; 1,700 shp (1,300 kW)
- Propulsion: 1 × Falk main reduction gears; 2 × Propellers
- Speed: 12 kn (22 km/h; 14 mph)
- Range: 24,000 nmi (44,000 km; 28,000 mi) at 9 kn (17 km/h; 10 mph) while displacing 3,960 long tons (4,024 t)
- Boats & landing craft carried: 2 or 6 x LCVPs
- Capacity: 2,100 tons oceangoing maximum; 350 tons main deckload
- Troops: 163
- Complement: 117
- Armament: Varied, ultimate armament; 1 × QF 12-pounder 12 cwt naval gun; 6 × 20 mm (0.79 in) Oerlikon cannon; 4 × Fast Aerial Mine (FAM) mounts

HMS LST-421 was a United States Navy LST-1-class tank landing ship that was transferred to the Royal Navy during World War II. As with many of her class, the ship was never named. Instead, she was referred to by her hull designation.

== Construction ==
LST-421 was laid down on 11 November 1942, under Maritime Commission (MARCOM) contract, MC hull 941, by the Bethlehem-Fairfield Shipyard, Baltimore, Maryland; launched 5 December 1942; then transferred to the United Kingdom and commissioned on 26 January 1943.

== Service history ==
LST-421, in company with sister ships LST-324 and LST-412, left New York, 13 March 1943, with refinery equipment bound for Curaçao, she then sailed to Freetown, Sierra Leone. LST-412 participated with the Royal Navy during the invasion of Sicily, the Salerno landings, the Anzio landings, and the invasion of Normandy, June 1944.

LST-421 saw no active service in the United States Navy. She was decommissioned and returned to United States Navy custody on 29 November 1946, and struck from the Naval Vessel Register on 1 August 1947. The tank landing ship was sold to the Tung Hwa Trading Co., Singapore, on 7 October 1947 and converted for merchant service.

== See also ==
- List of United States Navy LSTs

== Notes ==
Citations

== Bibliography ==
Online resources

- "LST-421". Dictionary of American Naval Fighting Ships. Naval History and Heritage Command. This article incorporates text from this source, which is in the public domain.
- "Bethlehem-Fairfield, Baltimore MD". www.ShipbuildingHistory.com. 14 August 2008.
- "USS LST-421". NavSource. 3 November 2006.
