= USS ABSD-6 =

WWII American floating drydock

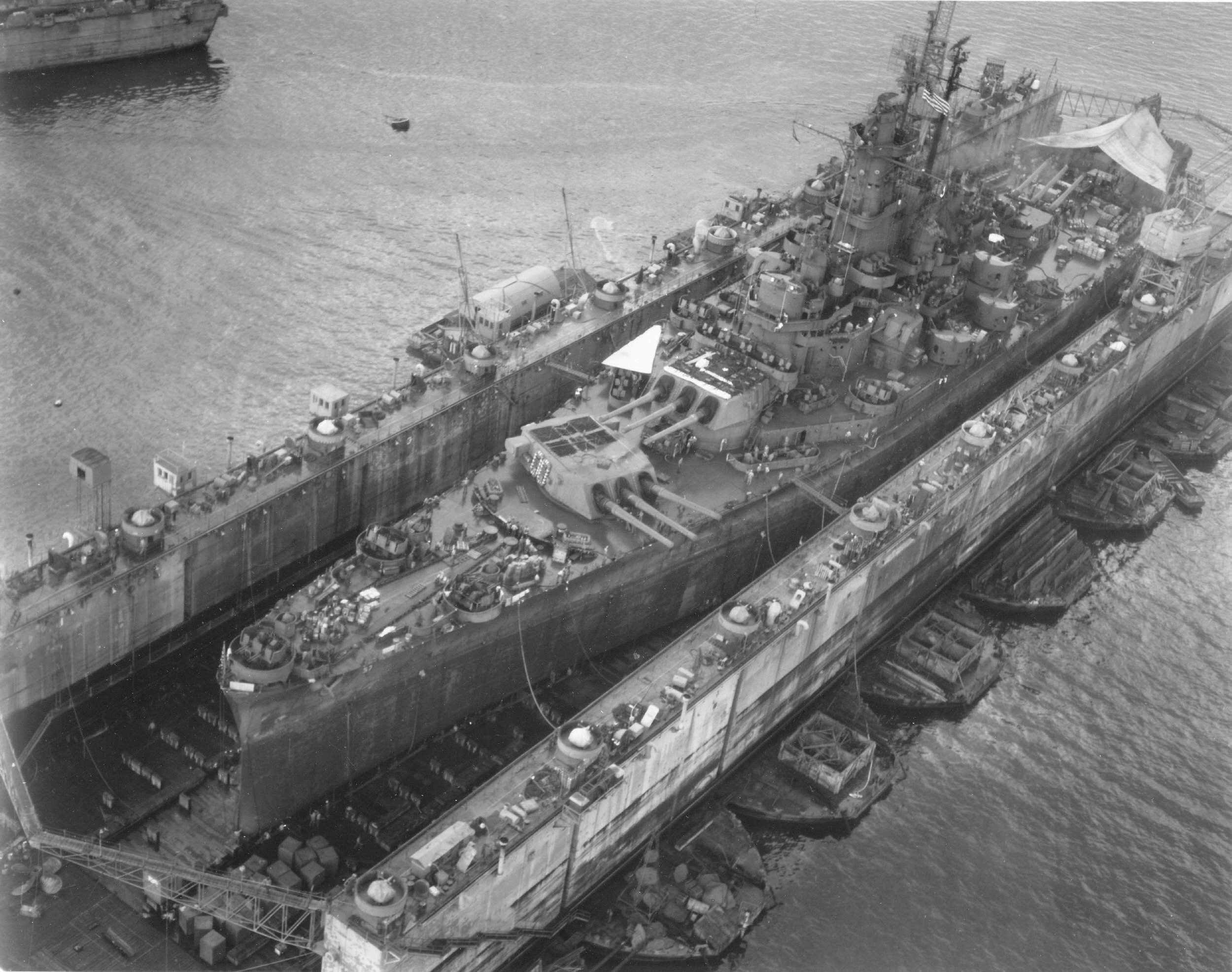
- USS ABSD-6 repairing USS South Dakota at Apra Harbor at Guam.

History

United States
- Name: ABSD-6 - (AFDB-6)
- Builder: Mare Island Naval Shipyard in Vallejo, California
- Laid down: 1943-1943
- Launched: 1943
- Acquired: December of 1944
- Commissioned: 28 September 1944
- Decommissioned: January of 1947
- Out of service: 29 June 1946
- Reclassified: AFDB-6 (Large Auxiliary Floating Dry Dock)
- Honours and awards: American Campaign Medal Asiatic-Pacific Campaign Medal World War II Victory Medal
- Fate: Scrapped 1 January 1976

General characteristics
- Type: Advance Base Sectional Drydock
- Displacement: 30,800 long tons (31,294 t)
- Length: 844 ft 3 in (257.33 m) with nine selections (A-G)
- Beam: 246 ft 5 in (75.11 m)
- Draft: 8 ft 8 in (2.64 m)
- Propulsion: None
- Complement: 22 officers and 471 enlisted men
- Armament: 14 × 40 mm (1.6 in) guns; 14 × 20 mm (0.79 in) guns

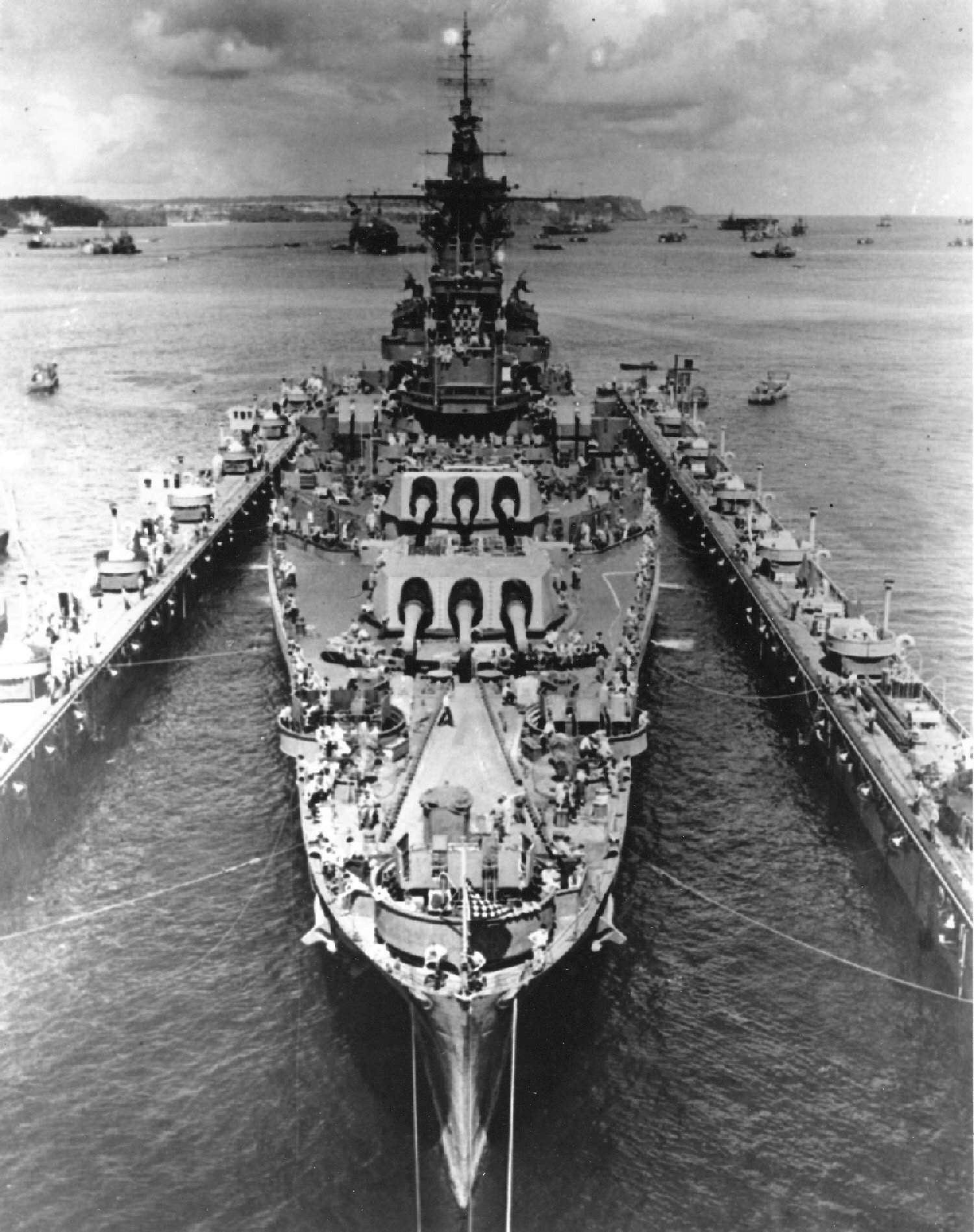
USS ABSD-6 submerged, USS ABSD-6 repaired USS South Dakota in Guam. Repairs were done in ABSD-6 dry dock after an accidental explosion damaged her on 6 May 1945, while rearming from USS Wrangell

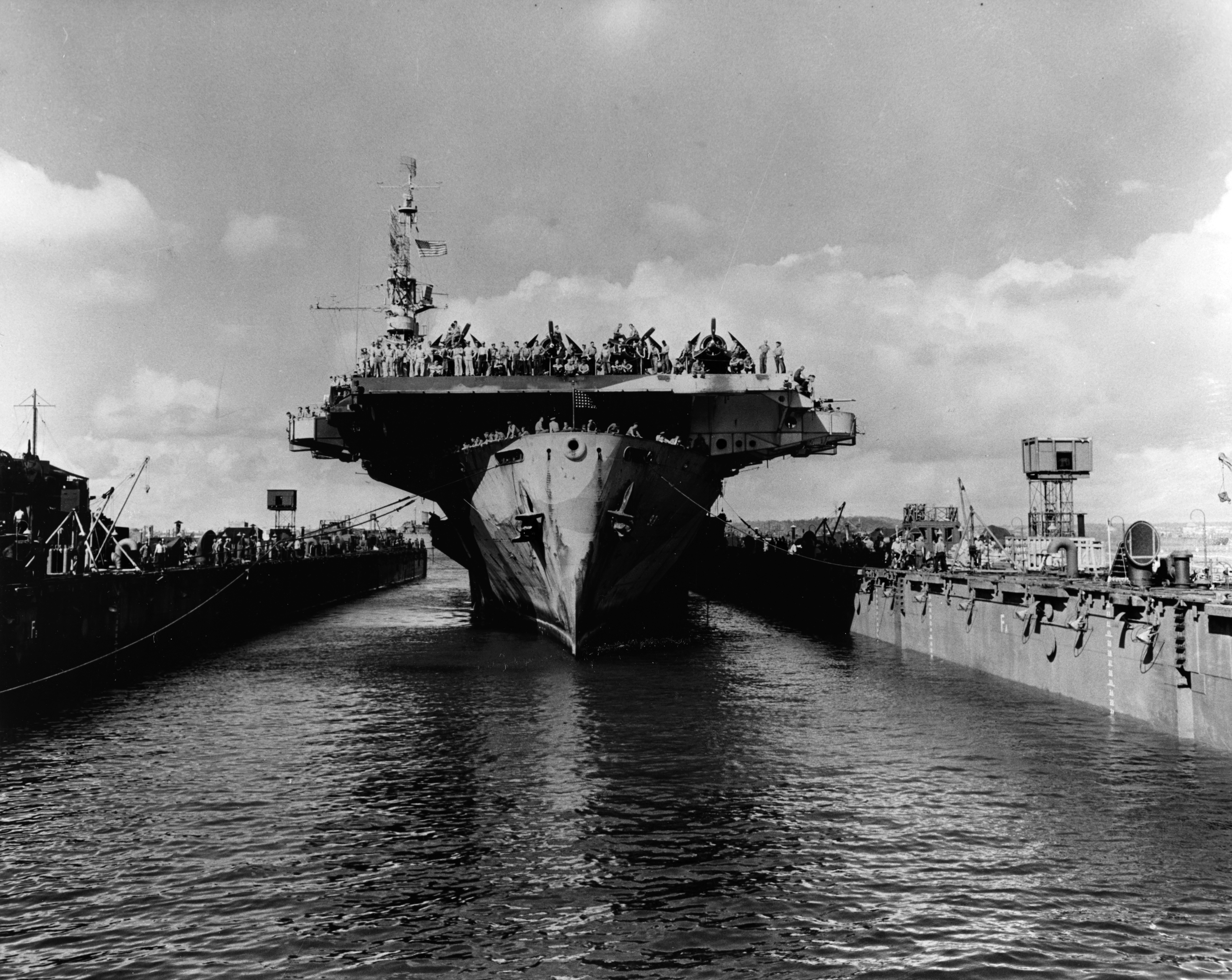
USS Makin Island halfway into USS ABSD-6, at Guam, 8 June 1945.

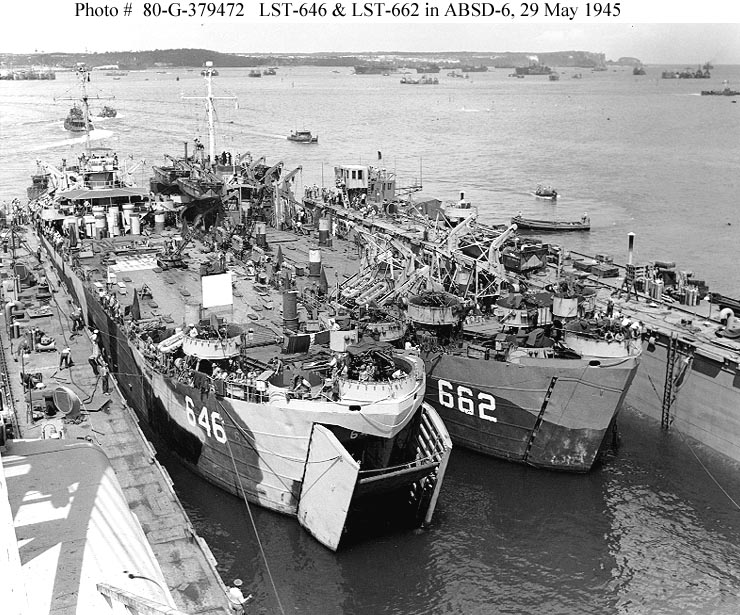
USS LST-646 and USS LST-662 in ABSD-6, in Apra Harbor, Guam, 29 May 1945

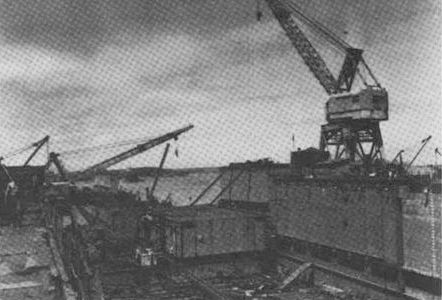
USS ABSD-6 being assembled at Apra Harbor, Guam in 1945

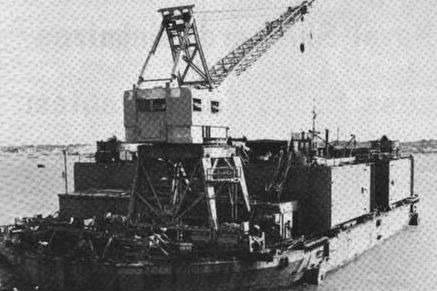
ABSD-6's Section D and one crane under tow to Guam. pontoons are folded down to reduce wind resistance and lower center of gravity

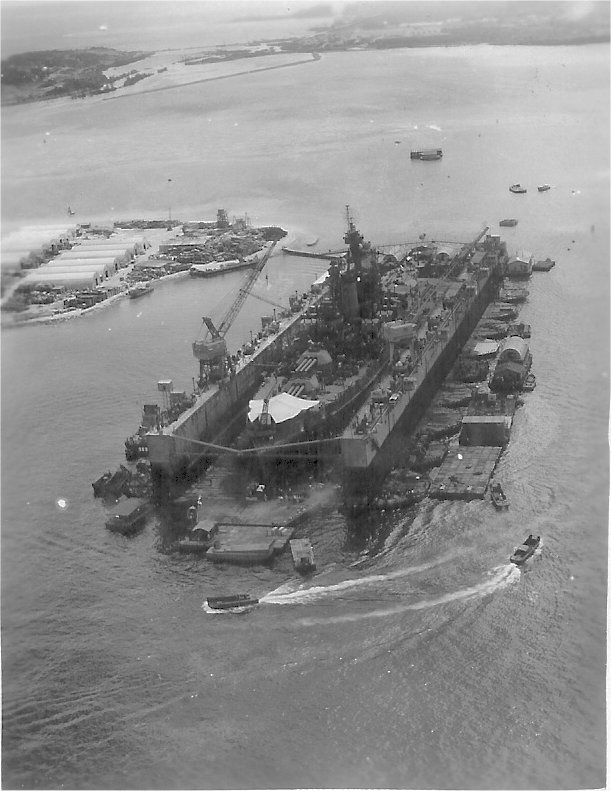
ABSD-6's sister ship, USS ABSD-3 at Guam, to the rear right of ABSD-3 is the land base that supported ABSD-6 and ABSD-3 crew

ABSD-6 is an advanced base sectional dock which was constructed of nine advance base docks (ABD) sections for the US Navy as an auxiliary floating drydock for World War II. ABSD-6 was built by Mare Island Naval Shipyard at Vallejo, California. ABSD-6 was commissioned on 28 September 1944. Advance Base Sectional Dock-6 (Auxiliary Floating Dock Big-6) was constructed in sections during 1942 and 1943. Each section are 3,850 tons and are 93 feet long each. Each Section had a 165 feet beam, a 75 feet molded depth and had 10,000 tons lifting capacity each. There were 4 ballast compartments in each section. With all nine sections joined, she was 825 feet long, 28 feet tall (keel to welldeck), and with an inside clear width of 133 feet 7 inches. ABSD-2 had a traveling 15-ton capacity crane with an 85-foot radius and two or more support barges. The two side walls were folded down under tow to reduce wind resistance and lower the center of gravity. ABSD-6 had 6 capstans for pulling, each rated at 24,000 lbf (110,000 N) at 30 ft/min (0.15 m/s), 4 of the capstans were reversible.

== World War II ==
Commissioned as USS ABSD-6 on 28 September 1944, ABSD-6 was assigned to the Asiatic-Pacific Theater. ABSD-6 was towed in sections to the Naval Base Guam at Apra Harbor in Guam, Marianas Islands. After assembling she was placed in service to repair ships at Guam with her sister ship USS ABSD-3. On an island in the harbor at Guam the Navy built a base to support the crew of ABSD-6 and ABSD-3. At the base were supplies, movie theater, mess hall, Officers Clubs, movie theater, and Enlisted club and more. The base was built mostly with quonset huts. The largest repairs at Guam was that of the battleship USS South Dakota (BB-57) in May 1945. South Dakota was in need of drydock repairs after an accidental explosion on 6 May 1945 while South Dakota was rearming from USS Wrangell. South Dakota was at Guam with ABSD-6 from 11 to 29 May 1945. Due to South Dakota's 36.3 ft (11.1 m) draft with a full load, the battleship had to unload much of her ammunition and fuel oil before entering AFDB-6. Another large ship repaired and painted was USS Makin Island, a 7,800-ton Casablanca-class escort carrier. Able to lift 90,000 tons ABSD-6 could raise large ships like, aircraft carriers, battleships, cruisers, and large auxiliary ships, out the water for repair below the ship's waterline. She was also used to repair multiple smaller ships at the same time. Ships in continuous use during war need repair both from wear and from war damage from naval mine and torpedoes. Rudders and propellers are best serviced on dry docks. Without ABSD-6 and her sister ships, at remote locations months could be lost in a ships returning to a home port for repair. ABSD-6 had power stations, ballast pumps, repair shops, machine shops, and could be self-sustaining. ABSD-6 had two rail track moveable cranes able to lift tons of material and parts for removing damage parts and install new parts. Some of the ships repaired by ABSD-6 at Guam:

- USS LCI-80 Landing Craft Infantry
- USS LCI-449
- USS LST-643 29 May 1945 Landing Ship, Tank
- USS LST-759 29 May 1945
- USS LST-646 29 May 1945
- USS LST-662 29 May 1945
- USS LSM-32 Landing Ship Medium
- USS LCI-992
- USS Steamer Bay May 1945
- USS Duluth June 1945
- USS Spangler July 1945
- USS LSM-112 27 July 1945
- USS LSM-334 27 July 1945
- USS LSM-426
- USS Tills August 1945
- USS Holland August 1945
- USS LSM-279 15 January 1946
- USS LSM-491
- USS LSM-308
- USS LSM-27
- USS LSM-348
- USS LSM-85

== Post war ==
ABSD-6 was decommissioned on 29 June 1946 and laid up in the US Navy Reserve Fleet. ABSD-6 was re-designated Large Auxiliary Floating Dry Dock AFDB-6. AFDB-6 was sold for scrap on 1 January 1976 by the Defense Reutilization and Marketing Service.
