= Tills =

Tills may refer to:

- Robert Tills, the first American naval officer killed during the Battle of the Philippines.
- USS Tills (DE-748), a Cannon-class destroyer escort named after Robert Tills.

== See also ==
- Till (disambiguation)
