= Elmo Zumwalt =

United States Navy admiral (1920–2000)

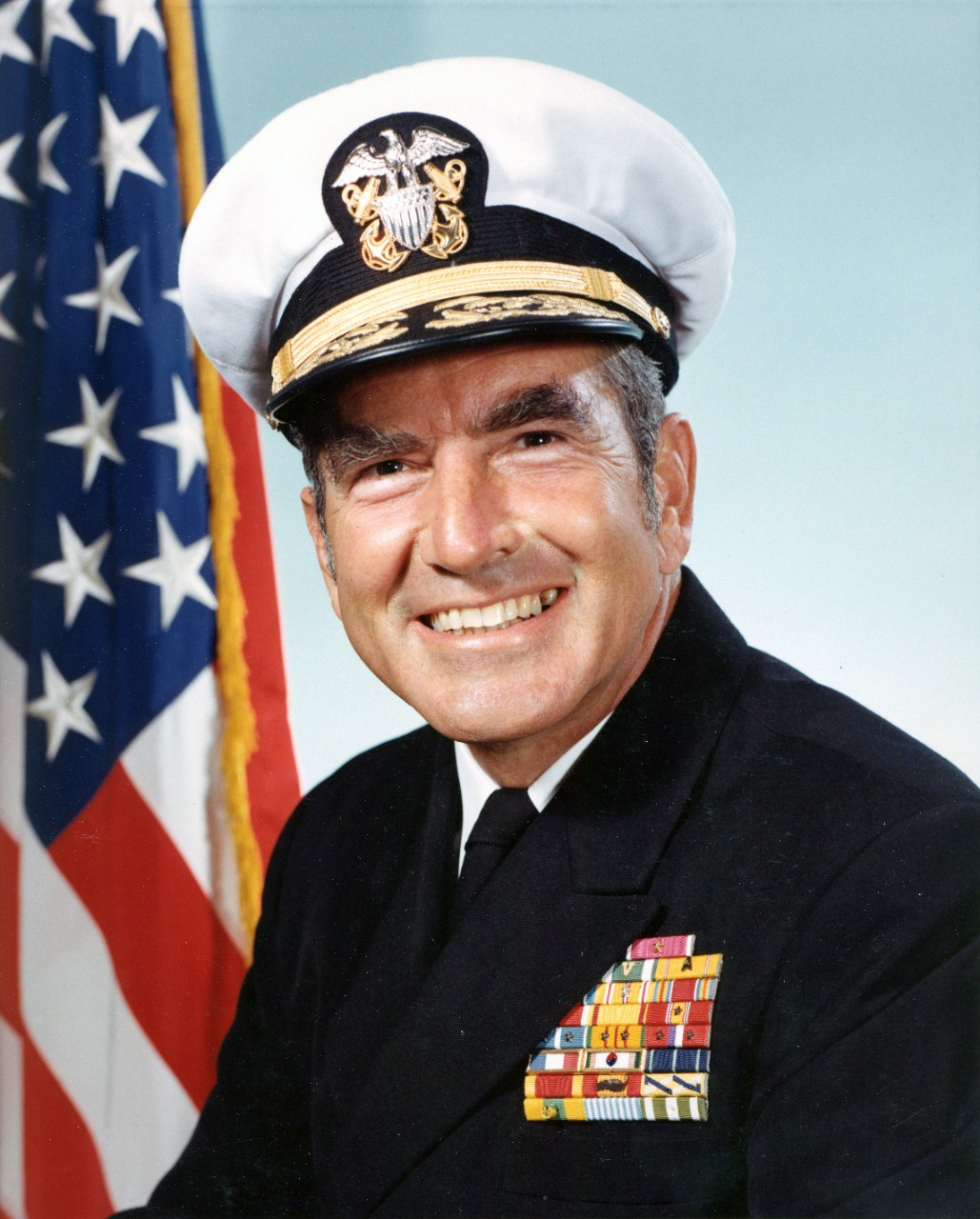
- Zumwalt in August 1970
- Born: November 29, 1920; San Francisco, California, US
- Died: January 2, 2000 (aged 79); Durham, North Carolina, US
- Burial place: United States Naval Academy Cemetery
- Spouses: Jane Carey (m. 1942; div. 1944); Mouza Coutelais-du-Roche (m. 1945–2000)
- Military career
- Allegiance: United States
- Branch: United States Navy
- Service years: 1942–1974
- Rank: Admiral
- Nickname: "Bud"
- Units: USS Phelps; USS Robinson; USS Saufley; USS Zellars; USS Wisconsin
- Commands: Chief of Naval Operations; Naval Forces Vietnam; Cruiser-Destroyer Flotilla Seven; USS Dewey; USS Arnold J. Isbell; USS Tills
- Conflicts: World War II; Battle of Leyte Gulf; Korean War; Vietnam War
- Awards: Navy Distinguished Service Medal (3); Legion of Merit (2); Bronze Star Medal with Valor device; Navy Commendation Medal with Valor device

Elmo Russell "Bud" Zumwalt Jr. (November 29, 1920 – January 2, 2000) was a United States Navy officer and the youngest person to serve as Chief of Naval Operations. As an admiral and later the 19th Chief of Naval Operations, Zumwalt played a major role in United States military history, especially during the Vietnam War. A decorated war veteran, Zumwalt reformed United States Navy personnel policies in an effort to improve enlisted life and ease racial tensions. After he retired from a 32-year navy career, he launched an unsuccessful campaign for the United States Senate.

== Early life and education ==
Zumwalt was born in San Francisco, California, the son of Elmo Russell Zumwalt, and his wife, Frances Pearl (née Frank) Zumwalt, both country doctors. Frances was raised Jewish, the daughter of Julius and Sarah Frank of Burlington, Vermont. His family moved to Tulare, California, where he grew up. She became estranged from her parents for marrying outside the faith, as the Zumwalts were Christians.

Zumwalt, an Eagle Scout and recipient of the Distinguished Eagle Scout Award from the Boy Scouts of America, attended Tulare Union High School in Tulare, California, where he became the valedictorian, and Rutherford Preparatory School in Long Beach, California.

== Naval career ==
=== Naval Academy and World War II ===
Zumwalt had planned to become a doctor like his parents, but in 1939, he was accepted to the United States Naval Academy (USNA) at Annapolis, Maryland. As a midshipman at the USNA, he was president of the Trident Society, vice president of the Quarterdeck Society and the two-time winner of the June Week Public Speaking Contest (1940–41). Zumwalt also participated in intercollegiate debating and was a Company Commander (1941) and Regimental Three Striper (1942). He graduated with distinction and was commissioned as an ensign on June 19, 1942. He also received an honorary degree from Texas Tech University.

Zumwalt was assigned to USS Phelps, a destroyer. In August 1943, Phelps was detached for instruction in the Operational Training Command-Pacific in San Francisco. In January 1944, Zumwalt reported for duty on board USS Robinson. On this ship, he was awarded the Bronze Star Medal with Valor device for "heroic service as Evaluator in the Combat Information Center ... in action against enemy Japanese battleships during the Battle for Leyte Gulf, October 25, 1944".

After the end of World War II in August 1945, Zumwalt continued to serve until December 8, 1945, as the prize crew officer of the Ataka, a 1,200-ton Japanese river gunboat with a crew of 200. In this capacity, he took the first American-controlled ship since the outbreak of World War II up the Huangpu River to Shanghai, China. There, they helped to restore order and assisted in disarming the Japanese.

=== Command assignments ===
Zumwalt next served as executive officer of the destroyer USS Saufley, and in March 1946, was transferred to the destroyer USS Zellars, as executive officer and navigator.

In January 1948, Zumwalt was assigned to the Naval Reserve Officers Training Corps unit of the University of North Carolina, where he remained until June 1950. That same month, he assumed command of USS Tills, a destroyer escort that was commissioned in a reserve status. The Tills was placed in full active commission at Charleston Naval Shipyard on November 21, 1950, and he continued to command her until March 1951, when he joined the battleship USS Wisconsin as navigator and served with the ship in operations in Korea.

Detached from USS Wisconsin in June 1952, he attended the Naval War College, Newport, Rhode Island, and in June 1953, he reported as head of the Shore and Overseas Bases Section, Bureau of Naval Personnel, Navy Department, Washington, D.C. He also served as officer and enlisted requirements officer, and as action officer on Medicare legislation. Completing that tour of duty in July 1955, he assumed command of the destroyer USS Arnold J. Isbell, participating in two deployments with the United States Seventh Fleet. In this assignment, he was commended by the Commander, Cruiser-Destroyer Forces, United States Pacific Fleet, for winning the Battle Efficiency Competition for his ship and for winning Excellence Awards in Engineering, Gunnery, Anti-Submarine Warfare, and Operations. In July 1957, he returned to the Bureau of Naval Personnel for further duty. In December 1957, he was transferred to the Office of the Assistant Secretary of the Navy (Personnel and Reserve Forces), and served as special assistant for naval personnel until November 1958, then as special assistant and naval aide until August 1959.

Ordered to the first ship built from the keel up as a guided missile frigate, USS Dewey, built at the Bath (Maine) Iron Works, he assumed command of that frigate at her commissioning in December 1959, and commanded it until June 1961. During the period of his command, Dewey earned the Excellence Award in Engineering, Supply, Weapons, and was runner-up in the Battle Efficiency Competition. He was a student at the National War College, Washington, D.C., during the 1961–1962 class year. In June 1962, he was assigned to the Office of the Assistant Secretary of Defense (International Security Affairs), Washington, D.C., where he served first as desk officer for France, Spain, and Portugal, then as director of arms control and contingency planning for Cuba. From December 1963 until June 21, 1965, he served as executive assistant and senior aide to the Honorable Paul H. Nitze, Secretary of the Navy. For duty in his tour in the offices of the Secretary of Defense and the Secretary of the Navy, he was awarded the Legion of Merit.

=== Flag assignments ===
==== Vietnam ====
After his selection for the rank of rear admiral, Zumwalt assumed command of Cruiser-Destroyer Flotilla Seven on 24 July 1965 in San Diego. He then served as Director, Systems Analysis Division, OPNAV (OP-96) from August 1966 to August 1968. In September 1968, he became Commander Naval Forces Vietnam and Chief of the Naval Advisory Group, United States Military Assistance Command Vietnam (MACV) and was promoted to vice admiral in October 1968. Zumwalt was the Navy adviser to General Creighton Abrams, Commander, MACV. Zumwalt always spoke very highly of Abrams, and said that Abrams was the most caring officer he had ever known.

Zumwalt's command was not a blue-water force, like the Seventh Fleet; it was a brown-water unit: he commanded the flotilla of Swift Boats that patrolled the coasts, harbors, and rivers of Vietnam. Among the swift-boat commanders were his son Elmo Russell Zumwalt III and later future senator and secretary of state John Kerry. Among his other forces were Task Force 115, the Coastal Surveillance Force, Task Force 116, the River Patrol Force and Task Force 117, the joint Army-Navy Mobile Riverine Force.

==== Chief of Naval Operations ====
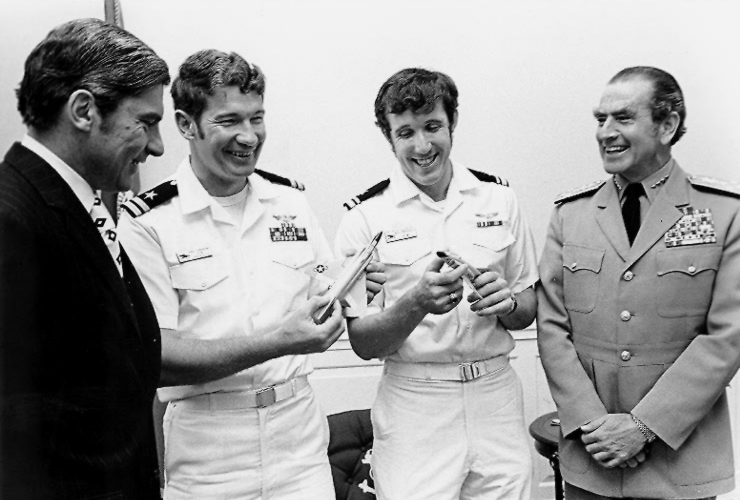
L-R Secretary of the Navy John Warner, Randall "Duke" Cunningham, William Driscoll, and CNO Zumwalt.

President Richard Nixon nominated Zumwalt to be Chief of Naval Operations in April 1970. Upon being relieved as Commander Naval Forces Vietnam on May 15, 1970, he was awarded a second Navy Distinguished Service Medal for exceptionally meritorious service.

Zumwalt assumed duties as Chief of Naval Operations and was promoted to full admiral on July 1, 1970, and quickly began a series of moves intended to reduce racism and sexism in the Navy. These were disseminated in Navy-wide communications known as "Z-grams". These included orders authorizing beards (sideburns, mustaches, and longer groomed hair were also acceptable) and introducing beer-dispensing machines to barracks.

Zumwalt instituted the 'Mod Squad'—Destroyer Squadron 26 and later 31—to give promising young officers early command experience. Billets were a rank lower than normal.

Zumwalt was the last Chief of Naval Operations to live at Number One Observatory Circle before it became the official residence of the vice president. For Zumwalt, not pleased with the choice, this was reason enough to challenge Virginia Senator Harry F. Byrd Jr. in the 1976 Senate election in Virginia.

Elmo Zumwalt Jr. retired from the Navy on July 1, 1974, aged 53.

==== "High-Low" plan ====
As Chief of Naval Operations, Zumwalt reshaped the Navy's effort to replace large numbers of aging World War II-era vessels, a plan called "High-Low". Instituted over the resistance of Admiral Hyman Rickover and others, High-Low sought to balance the purchase of high-end, nuclear-powered vessels with low-end, cheaper ones that could be bought in greater numbers. Rickover, the 'Father of the Nuclear Navy', preferred buying a few major ships to buying many ordinary ones. Zumwalt proposed four kinds of warships to fit the plan; in the end, only the Pegasus class of missile patrol boats and the Oliver Hazard Perry-class of guided missile frigates became reality, and only six of the planned 100+ Pegasus-class hydrofoils were built. The Oliver Hazard Perry class (the "low" option to the "high" of the Spruance-class destroyer) stood as the most numerous class of United States' warships since World War II until the advent of the Arleigh Burke-class destroyers. Other pairings included the Ticonderoga-class cruiser (then designated as a destroyer) as the "low" option to the Strike Cruiser, and the Sea Control Ship and Aircraft Carrier (Medium) as the "low" options to the Nimitz-class aircraft carrier. These pairings were never realized, however.

== List of Z-grams ==
"Z-gram" was the semi-official title for policy directives issued by Elmo Zumwalt as Chief of Naval Operations (CNO). Many of these directives were efforts to reform outdated policies potentially contributing to difficulties recruiting and retaining qualified naval personnel during the period of United States withdrawal from the Vietnam War.

List of Z-grams
- Z-gram 1 (1 July 1970): Zumwalt's remarks upon taking office as CNO.
- Z-gram 2 (14 July 1970): convened a junior officer retention study group.
- Z-gram 3 (22 July 1970): Cryptographic procedures and Policy.
- Z-gram 4 (30 July 1970): authorized 30 days leave for officers with orders for a permanent change of station (PCS).
- Z-gram 5 (30 July 1970): instituted a test program aboard six ships to extend to 1st class petty officers the privilege of officers and chief petty officers (CPOs) to keep civilian clothing aboard ship for wearing on liberty.
- Z-gram 6 (11 August 1970): instituted a test program, funded entirely by deployed personnel to assist their families obtaining transportation and lodging to visit them in an overseas liberty port during holiday periods.
- Z-gram 7 (11 August 1970): directed commanding officers to assign sponsors for newly arriving personnel. The sponsors were normally of the same rank or rate and with similar marital and family status to assist the arriving family establishing themselves in the new location.
- Z-gram 8 (11 August 1970): extended the working hours of personnel writing officers' orders from 16:30 to 21:00 so those personnel would be available to answer telephone questions after duty hours of officers expecting orders.
- Z-gram 9 (14 August 1970): provided an alternative means of promotion to 1st class and CPO for highly motivated individuals who had five times failed the normal promotion examinations.
- Z-gram 10 (20 August 1970): required naval air stations to have an officer or CPO meet each arriving transient aircraft to coordinate aircraft servicing and assist flight crew with dining and temporary lodging.
- Z-gram 11 (24 August 1970): authorized continuing sea duty for enlisted men requesting it.
- Z-gram 12 (24 August 1970): authorized wearing of civilian clothes on shore bases during and after the evening meal by all enlisted personnel except recruits in basic training.
- Z-gram 13 (26 August 1970): directed commanding officers to grant 30 days of leave to at least half of their crew during the first 30 days following return from overseas deployment.
- Z-gram 14 (27 August 1970): abolished 18 collateral duties traditionally assigned to junior officers (including cigarette fund officer and cold weather officer) and encouraged assignment of another 18 collateral duties (including movie officer and athletics officer) to qualified senior petty officers.
- Z-gram 15 (28 August 1970): ordered all disbursing officers to provide all personnel with a statement of earnings prior to 30 October 1970 itemizing basic pay and allowances for clothing, quarters, sea duty, and hostile fire with taxes, deductions and allotments.
- Z-gram 16 (2 September 1970): established a computer database to assist enlisted personnel desiring a duty swap with a similarly qualified sailor on another ship or home port.
- Z-gram 17 (2 September 1970): raised the check-cashing limit at naval bases from $25 to $50.
- Z-gram 18 (4 September 1970): opened the Navy Finance Center around the clock to all disbursing officers processing urgent inquiries about pay and benefits.
- Z-gram 19 (4 September 1970): implemented an executive order from President Nixon to authorize an increased percentage of early promotions for officers.
- Z-gram 20 (8 September 1970): required all shore bases to provide washing facilities and lockers for enlisted personnel assigned dirty work in dungarees.
- Z-gram 21 (9 September 1970): encouraged commanding officers to provide compensatory time off for personnel standing watch on holidays.
- Z-gram 22 (9 September 1970): authorized shore bases to organize facility improvement teams for welfare, living and parking facilities.
- Z-gram 23 (12 September 1970): established the CPO advisory board to the CNO.
- Z-gram 24 (14 September 1970): established procedures for Navy wives to present complaints, viewpoints and suggestions to commanding officers of shore bases.
- Z-gram 25 (16 September 1970): authorized ships in port to reduce watch standing rotation from one day in four to one day in six.
- Z-gram 26 (21 September 1970): shifted responsibility for shore patrol staffing from shipboard to shore-based personnel at major naval bases.
- Z-gram 27 (21 September 1970): eliminated routine local operations over a weekend by ships sailing from their home port.
- Z-gram 28 (21 September 1970): was a status report on implementation of recommendations by retention study groups.
- Z-gram 29 (22 September 1970): encouraged commanding officers to allow leave for 5% of their crew during overseas deployments.
- Z-gram 30 (23 September 1970): established "hard-rock" officers' clubs for junior officers at five naval bases and encouraged other naval base officers' clubs to allow at least one room for casual dress, encourage unescorted young ladies to visit the clubs, and appoint younger officers to advise club managers about other measures to improve morale of junior officers.
- Z-gram 31 (23 September 1970): established a junior officer ship-handling competition whose winners would be able to pick their next duty assignment.
- Z-gram 32 (23 September 1970): allowed sailors to arrange their own re-enlistment ceremonies with assistance from their command.
- Z-gram 33 (25 September 1970): established a procedure to improve customer relations at naval Base Exchanges.
- Z-gram 34 (25 September 1970): eliminated the requirement for junior officers to own formal dinner dress uniforms.
- Z-gram 35 (25 September 1970): authorized alcoholic beverages in barracks and beer vending machines in senior enlisted barracks.
- Z-gram 36 (26 September 1970): encouraged commanding officers to improve the customer service ethic at base dispensaries and disbursing facilities.
- Z-gram 37 (26 September 1970): reduced the rank required for command of aviation squadrons from commander to lieutenant commander.
- Z-gram 38 (28 September 1970): instructed commanding officers to eliminate scheduling of work routine on Sundays and holidays unless ship is deployed overseas.
- Z-gram 39 (5 October 1970): extended the operating hours of 25 large base commissaries to reduce crowds on Saturday mornings and paydays.
- Z-gram 40 (7 October 1970): gave sailors the option of being paid either in cash or by check.
- Z-gram 41 (21 October 1970): established a Command Excellence chair at the Naval War College to be filled by a commander or captain with a record of outstanding performance in command.
- Z-gram 42 (13 October 1970): allowed junior officers to request sea duty as their first choice for initial duty assignment.
- Z-gram 43 (13 October 1970): encouraged commanding officers to help disbursing officers speedily process large travel reimbursement claims.
- Z-gram 44 (13 October 1970): encouraged assignment of senior petty officers to stand in-port officer of the deck watches to reduce junior officer workload.
- Z-gram 45 (15 October 1970): encouraged commanding officers to increase support services to families of prisoners of war.
- Z-gram 46 (15 October 1970): reduced routine paperwork required for the 3M planned maintenance system inspections and documentation.
- Z-gram 47 (20 October 1970): increased responsibilities of department heads and executive officers of ships being deactivated.
- Z-gram 48 (23 October 1970): established a new Bureau of Naval Personnel office focused on providing information to dependent families of active duty personnel.
- Z-gram 49 (23 October 1970): required half of personnel on awards boards to be below the rank of commander.
- Z-gram 50 (23 October 1970): encouraged ships returning from overseas deployments to use shore based utilities to allow leave for increased numbers of engineering personnel.
- Z-gram 51 (23 October 1970): established a uniform breast insignia for officers in charge of brown-water navy boats.
- Z-gram 52 (23 October 1970): Dissemination of CNO policy.
- Z-gram 53 (2 November 1970): authorized annual publication of a list of job assignments available to junior officers, emphasizing geographical locations and required qualifications for career planning.
- Z-gram 54 (2 November 1970): outlined procedures for junior personnel to make suggestions to CNO.
- Z-gram 55 (4 November 1970): established pilot program for improving Navy human resources management.
- Z-gram 56 (9 November 1970): established a program similar to Z-16 for officers desiring a duty swap with a similarly qualified officer on another ship or home port.
- Z-gram 57 (10 November 1970): eliminated a broad spectrum of selectively enforced regulations and specified relaxed interpretations of others related to grooming standards and wearing of uniforms, so the vast majority of sailors would not be penalized by policies designed to constrain a few abusing the trust and confidence of less stringent rules.
- Z-gram 58 (14 November 1970): required ships' stores afloat to accept checks in payment for purchases.
- Z-gram 59 (14 November 1970): established a program for officers to spend a year of independent research and study for professional development in areas mutually beneficial to the officer and the Navy.
- Z-gram 60 (18 November 1970): encouraged all major naval installations to install a recording answering device on one telephone to receive suggestions.
- Z-gram 61 (19 November 1970): Authorized warrant officers and senior petty officers afloat to serve as communications watch officers and registered publications custodians.
- Z-gram 62 (27 November 1970): established a Naval War College forum to discuss improved naval personnel policies and present their views to CNO and Secretary of the Navy.
- Z-gram 63 (30 November 1970): reduced by 25% the number of publications to be maintained by ships.
- Z-gram 64 (3 December 1970): encouraged commanding officers to increase the opportunities for junior officers to practice ship handling.
- Z-gram 65 (5 December 1970): listed incentives for officers to volunteer for duty in Vietnam.
- Z-gram 66 (17 December 1970): directed every navy facility to appoint a minority group officer or senior petty officer as a minority affairs assistant to the commanding officer.
- Z-gram 67 (22 December 1970): streamlined required inspection procedures to reduce the amount of time required for preparation and execution.
- Z-gram 68 (23 December 1970): expanded the civilian clothing privilege explored in Z-gram 5 to all petty officers on all ships.
- Z-gram 69 (28 December 1970): eliminated command of a deep draft ship from the requirements for promotion to admiral.
- Z-gram 70 (21 January 1971): clarified grooming standards and working uniform regulations addressed by Z-gram 57 to reflect contemporary hair styles and allow wearing working uniforms while commuting between the base and off-base housing.

== Later years ==
After he retired, Zumwalt wrote On Watch: a Memoir, published by Quadrangle Books in 1976. It reviews his Navy career and includes reprints of all the Z-grams he issued as CNO.

Also in 1976, Zumwalt unsuccessfully ran as a Democratic candidate for the United States Senate from Virginia, and was defeated by incumbent independent senator Harry F. Byrd Jr. by a 57% to 38% result. Later, he held the presidency of the American Medical Building Corporation in Milwaukee, Wisconsin.

While serving in Shanghai in 1945, Zumwalt met and married Mouza Coutelais-du-Roche, whose French-Russian family was living there. She returned with him to the United States. They had four children: Elmo Russell Zumwalt III; James Gregory Zumwalt; Ann F. Zumwalt Coppola; and Mouzetta C. Zumwalt-Weathers.

Zumwalt's eldest son, Elmo Zumwalt III, served as a lieutenant on one of Zumwalt's patrol boats during the Vietnam War. In January 1983, he was diagnosed with lymphoma, and in 1985 it was then discovered he also had Hodgkin's disease. In addition, his grandson Elmo Russell Zumwalt IV had been born in 1977 with learning disabilities. Admiral Zumwalt and his family were convinced that both son and grandson were victims of Agent Orange, which the admiral had ordered to be sprayed over the Mekong Delta to kill vegetation and drive "the Viet Cong back 1,000 yards off the water's edge".

In an article published in The New York Times in 1986, Elmo Zumwalt III said:

I am a lawyer and I don't think I could prove in court, by the weight of the existing scientific evidence, that Agent Orange is the cause of all the medical problems – nervous disorders, cancer and skin problems – reported by Vietnam veterans, or of their children's severe birth defects. But I am convinced that it is.

Admiral Zumwalt and his son collaborated with writer John Pekkanen to create the book My Father, My Son, published by MacMillan in September 1986, where they discussed the family tragedy of his son's battle with cancer. In 1988, the book was made into a TV movie with the same name, starring Karl Malden as the admiral and Keith Carradine as his son. Elmo Zumwalt III died as the result of his cancer on August 14, 1988, at the age of 42, three months after the TV movie was shown.

During his son's illness in the early 1980s, Admiral Zumwalt was very active in lobbying Congress to establish a national registry of bone marrow donors. Such donors serve patients who do not have suitably matched bone marrow donors in their families. Though his son ultimately was able to receive a transplant from his own sister, many patients do not have close relatives who are able and willing to help in this way. As such, his efforts were a major factor in the founding of the National Marrow Donor Program (NMDP) in July 1986. Admiral Zumwalt was the first chairman of the NMDP's board of directors.

In his later years, Zumwalt resided in Arlington County, Virginia.

== Death and legacy ==
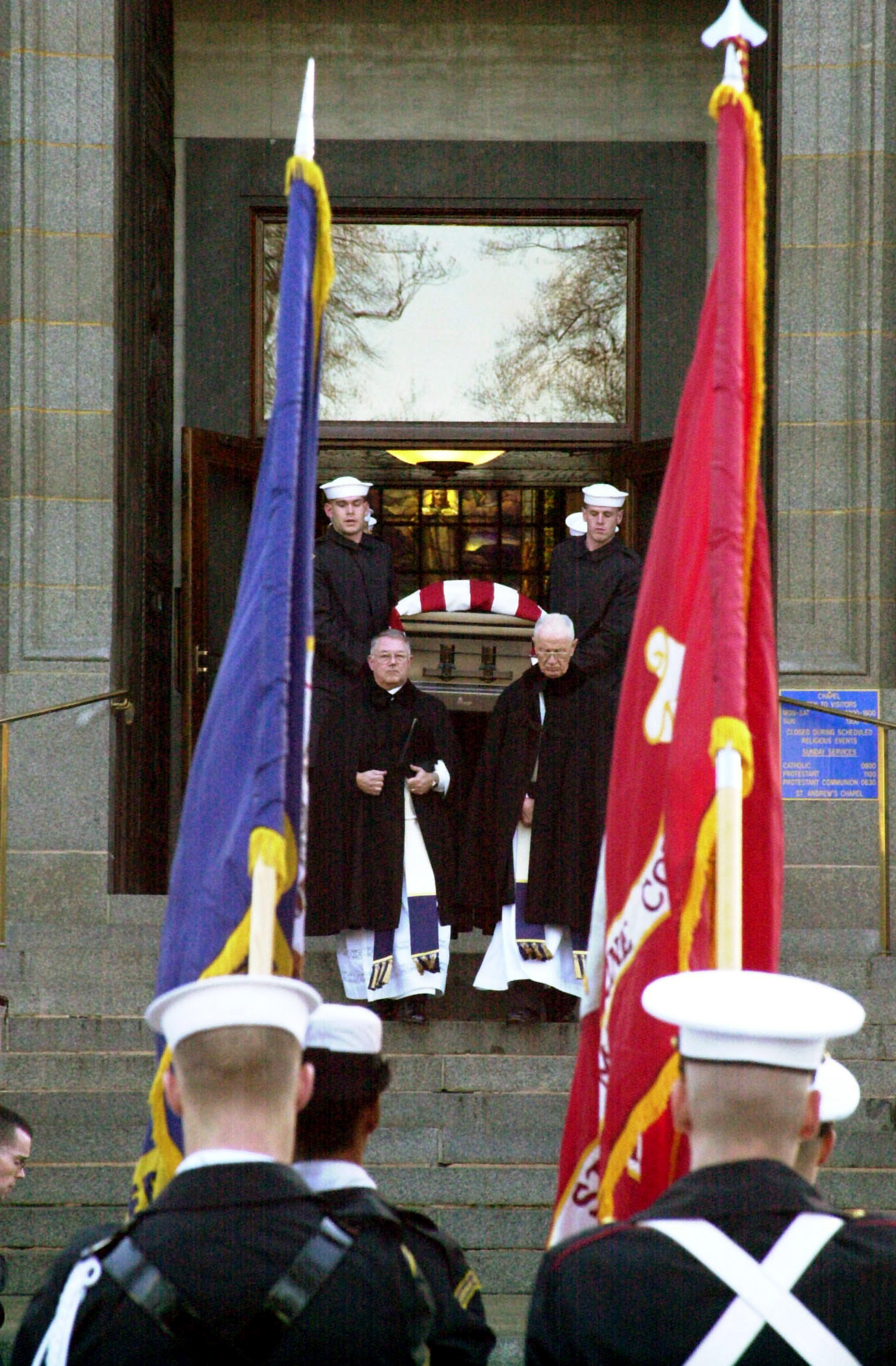
Zumwalt's casket being carried by pallbearers at his funeral in January 2000.

Zumwalt died on January 2, 2000, aged 79, at the Duke University Medical Center in Durham, North Carolina, from mesothelioma. His funeral service was held at the Naval Academy Chapel. In his eulogy President Bill Clinton called Zumwalt "the conscience of the United States Navy".

The United States Navy's DD(X) guided missile destroyer program has been named the Zumwalt class in his honor, and its lead ship, USS Zumwalt, bears his name by Navy tradition.

In 2013, the Mesothelioma Center for Excellence at the West Los Angeles VA Medical Center was renamed the Elmo Zumwalt Treatment & Research Center. It specializes in mesothelioma research, particularly for veterans who may have been exposed to asbestos during their service.

== Dates of rank ==
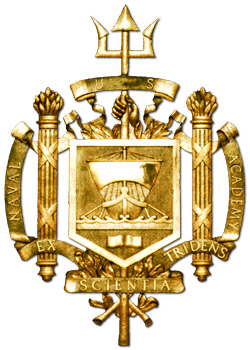
United States Naval Academy Midshipman – Class of 1943, which graduated on 19 June 1942 due to wartime necessity.

Ensign	Lieutenant, Junior Grade	Lieutenant	Lieutenant Commander	Commander	Captain
O-1	O-2	O-3	O-4	O-5	O-6
June 19, 1942	May 1, 1943	July 1, 1944	April 1, 1950	February 1, 1955	July 1, 1961

Rear Admiral (lower half)	Rear Admiral (upper half)	Vice Admiral	Admiral
O-7	O-8	O-9	O-10
Never Held	July 1, 1965	October 1, 1968	July 1, 1970

== Assignments ==
1. August 1942 – November 1943, watch officer, USS Phelps (DD-360)
2. November 1943 – December 1943, student, Operational Training Command Pacific, San Francisco, Cal.
3. January 1944 – October 1945, watch officer, USS Robinson (DD-562)
4. October 1945 – March 1946, executive officer, USS Saufley (DD-465)
5. March 1946 – January 1948, executive officer, USS Zellars (DD-777)
6. January 1948 – June 1950, assistant professor of naval sciences, NROTC Unit, University of North Carolina at Chapel Hill
7. June 1950 – March 1951, commanding officer, USS Tills (DE-748)
8. March 1951 – June 1952, navigator, USS Wisconsin (BB-64)
9. June 1952 – June 1953, student, Naval War College, Newport, Rhode Island
10. June 1953 – July 1955, Bureau of Naval Personnel, Washington, D.C.
11. July 1955 – July 1957, commanding officer, USS Arnold J. Isbell (DD-869)
12. July 1957 – December 1957: lieutenant detailer, Bureau of Naval Personnel
13. December 1957 – August 1959, special assistant, executive assistant, Office of the Assistant Secretary of the Navy for Personnel and Reserve Forces
14. August 1959 – June 1961, prospective commanding officer, commanding officer, USS Dewey (DLG-14)
15. August 1961 – June 1962, student, National War College, Washington, D.C.
16. June 1962 – December 1963, desk officer, Office of the Assistant Secretary of Defense (International Security Affairs)
17. December 1963 – June 1965, executive assistant, Office of the Secretary of the Navy
18. July 1965 – July 1966, Commander, Cruiser-Destroyer Flotilla Seven
19. August 1966 – August 1968 Director, Systems Analysis Division, Office of the CNO
20. September 1968 – May 1970, Commander, U.S. Naval Forces Vietnam and Chief, Naval Advisory Group Vietnam, Saigon, South Vietnam
21. July 1970 – June 1974, Chief of Naval Operations, the Pentagon, Arlington, Va.

== Awards and decorations ==
=== U.S. military awards and decorations ===
Navy Distinguished Service Medal with two gold award stars
Legion of Merit with gold award star
Bronze Star with Valor device
Navy Commendation Medal with Valor device
Navy Unit Commendation
China Service Medal
American Defense Service Medal with bronze "A" Device
American Campaign Medal
Asiatic-Pacific Campaign Medal with one silver and two bronze campaign stars
World War II Victory Medal
Navy Occupation Service Medal with "ASIA" clasp
National Defense Service Medal with one bronze service star
Korean Service Medal with two bronze service stars
Vietnam Service Medal with one silver and two bronze service stars
Navy Expert Rifle Marksmanship Ribbon

=== U.S. civilian awards ===
Presidential Medal of Freedom

=== Foreign awards ===
Grand Cross of the Order of May (Naval Merit), (Argentina)
Commander of the Order of Léopold, (Belgium)
Grade of High Officer of the Order of Naval Merit, (Bolivia)
Grand Officer of the Order of Naval Merit, (Brazil)
Grand Cross of the Order of the Southern Cross, (Brazil)
Order of Merit, (Chile)
Grand Officer of the Order of Naval Merit Admiral Padilla, (Colombia)
Grand Cross with Silver Breast Star of the Order of Merit of Duarte, Sánchez and Mella, (Dominican Republic)
Commander of the Legion of Honour, (France)
Grand Cross, Second Class of the Order of Merit, (Germany)
Grand Cross of the Order of George I, (Greece)
Bintang Jalasena, First Class (Indonesia)
Grand Cross of the Order of Merit of the Italian Republic, (Italy)
Grand Cordon of the Order of the Rising Sun, (Japan)
Order of Military Merit, Third Class (Republic of Korea)
Order of National Security Merit, Tong-Il Medal (Republic of Korea)
Grand Officer of the Order of Orange-Nassau (with Swords), (Netherlands)
Grand Cross of the Royal Norwegian Order of St. Olav, (Norway)
Commander Grand Cross of the Royal Order of the Sword, (Sweden)
Order of Naval Merit, First Class (Venezuela)
National Order of Vietnam, Third Class (Republic of Vietnam)
Republic of Vietnam Navy Distinguished Service Order, First Class (Republic of Vietnam)
Republic of Vietnam Gallantry Cross with Palm (Republic of Vietnam)
Chuong My Medal, 1st Class
Philippine Liberation Medal with two service stars (Philippines)
United Nations Korea Medal
Vietnam Campaign Medal (Republic of Vietnam)
Korean War Service Medal (Republic of Korea)

=== Foreign unit awards ===
Philippine Presidential Unit Citation (Philippines)
Korean Presidential Unit Citation (Republic of Korea)
Republic of Vietnam Gallantry Cross Unit Citation (Republic of Vietnam)
Vietnam Civil Actions Unit Citation (Republic of Vietnam)

=== Boy Scouts of America awards ===
Distinguished Eagle Scout Award

== See also ==
Military offices
Preceded by Thomas H. Moorer	Chief of Naval Operations; 1970–1974	Succeeded by James L. Holloway III
Party political offices
Preceded by George Rawlings	Democratic nominee for U.S. Senator from Virginia (Class 1); 1976	Succeeded by Dick Davis
