= On Watch: A Memoir =

1976 book by Elmo Zumwalt

- Author: Elmo Zumwalt
- Language: English
- Genre: Memoir
- Publisher: Quadrangle / The New York Times Company
- Publication date: 1976
- Publication place: United States
- ISBN: 978-0-8129-0520-5
- Followed by: My Father, My Son

On Watch: A Memoir is one of two books written by U.S. Navy admiral Elmo Zumwalt. Published in 1976, it is largely a critical appraisal of the military policies of the Richard Nixon presidency during the Cold War.

== Background ==
On Watch: A Memoir was published in 1976, shortly after Elmo Zumwalt's retirement from the U.S. Navy.

== Content ==
Though billed as a memoir, Zumwalt spends only the first three chapters of On Watch dealing with his early life, which included his time at the U.S. Naval Academy, service during World War II, and his family. Most of the rest of the volume addresses the years 1970 to 1974, when Zumwalt served as United States Chief of Naval Operations. In it, Zumwalt critically appraises the military policies of the Richard Nixon presidency with regard to Soviet containment at the height of the Cold War. In the book's preface, he remarks that Nixon and Henry Kissinger had "contempt for the patriotism and intelligence of the American people." He denounces Kissinger as being convinced that "the dynamics of history are on the side of the Soviet Union", and generally expresses his view that, under Nixon, the United States had become too accommodating to the USSR.

In addition to Nixon and Kissinger, Zumwalt takes aim at the then-elderly Admiral Hyman G. Rickover. Zumwalt charged: Rickover continually worked to ingratiate himself with members of the United States Congress as a means of consolidating personal political power; underhandedly challenged the authority of the Chief of Naval Operations; and would "stop at nothing" to ensure the primacy of nuclear programs over conventional armaments. Zumwalt also criticized Rickover's refusal to retire, stating that "his tour never ends because" Rickover's allies in Congress wouldn't allow it. (Note: At the time of the book's publication, Rickover was 75, the oldest officer in the Navy, having received a personal exemption to the mandatory retirement age by an act of Congress. He ultimately would be forced into retirement seven years later, aged 82.)

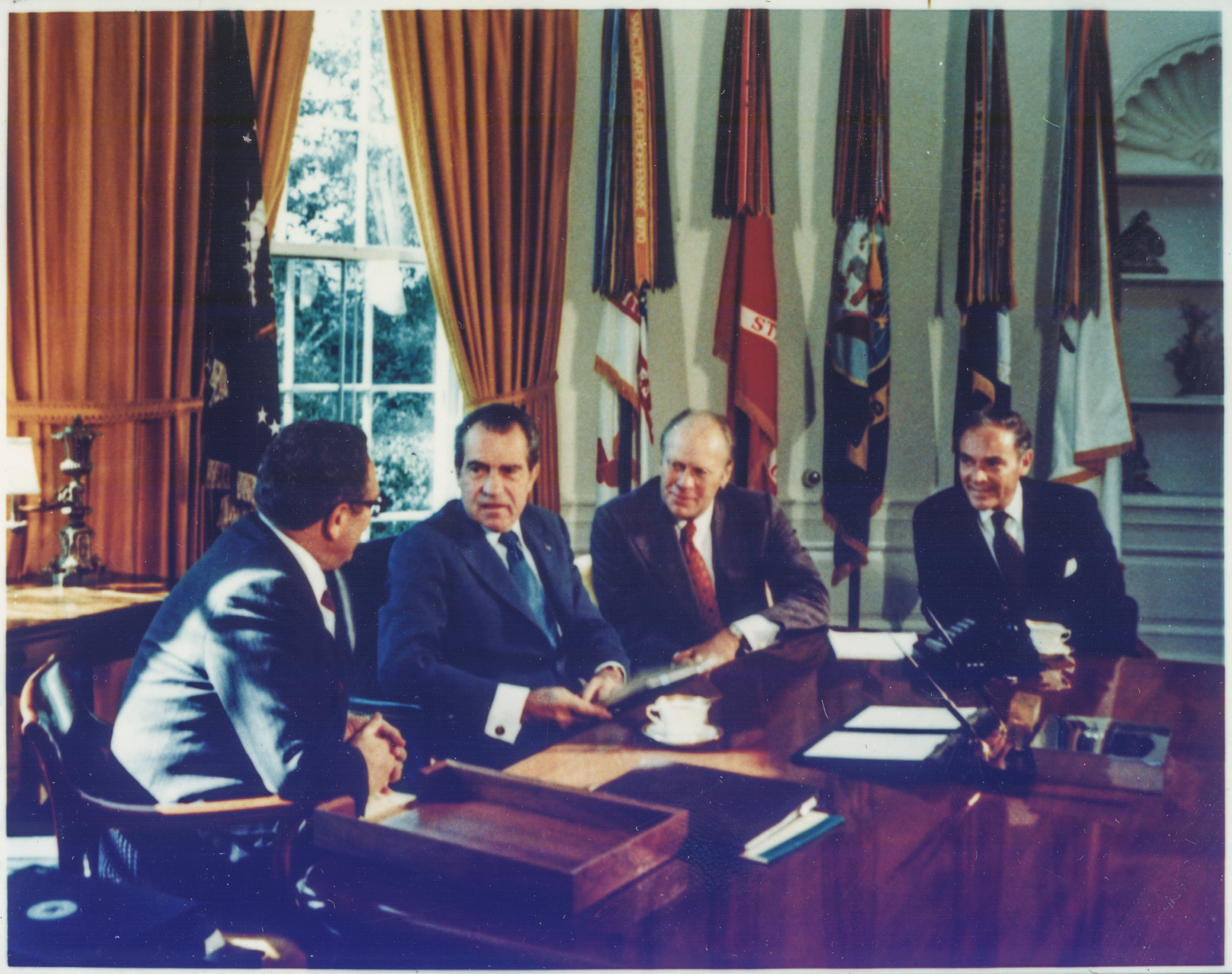
Zumwalt used his memoir to criticize the Nixon administration, which he felt was too accommodating to the Soviet Union.

Other sections of On Watch are spent on Zumwalt's glowing recollections of Paul Nitze, under whom he started working as an aide when Nitze was Assistant Secretary of Defense for International Security Affairs, as well as discussing the racial integration of the U.S. Navy, and the expanding role of women in military service.

== Reaction ==
A 1977 review of the book by Paolo Coletta, published in Air University Review, remarked that:

While the full story cannot appear until Nixon, Rickover, Kissinger, Haig, and former Secretary of the Navy John W. Warner, among others, tell their side of it—if they ever do—On Watch remains a terrifying tale of an administration so involved in escaping from the moral morass it had created and so dependent on a Lone Ranger to decide its foreign policies that the primary rule of national life, security, was neglected.

Kirkus Reviews, meanwhile, called the book an "informally elegant memoir" and "one of the major documents of the season".

Writing in the Annals of the American Academy of Political and Social Science, however, Paul Conway concluded that the book contained "too much mental masturbation about the likely outcome of conventional naval war between the U.S. and the Soviet Union" and encouraged readers to "search for alternatives to the policies that Zumwalt and Henry Kissinger represent in the text".

== Dedication ==
Zumwalt dedicated On Watch to Malcolm Scott Wine, who was the deputy director of Zumwalt's unsuccessful campaign for the Democratic Party-nomination for United States Senator from Virginia. Wine died in 1976, the year of the book's publication, of epileptic-related respiratory arrest.

== See also ==
- Crusade in Europe
