= USS Dewey (DDG-45) =

Guided missile destroyer of the U.S. Navy

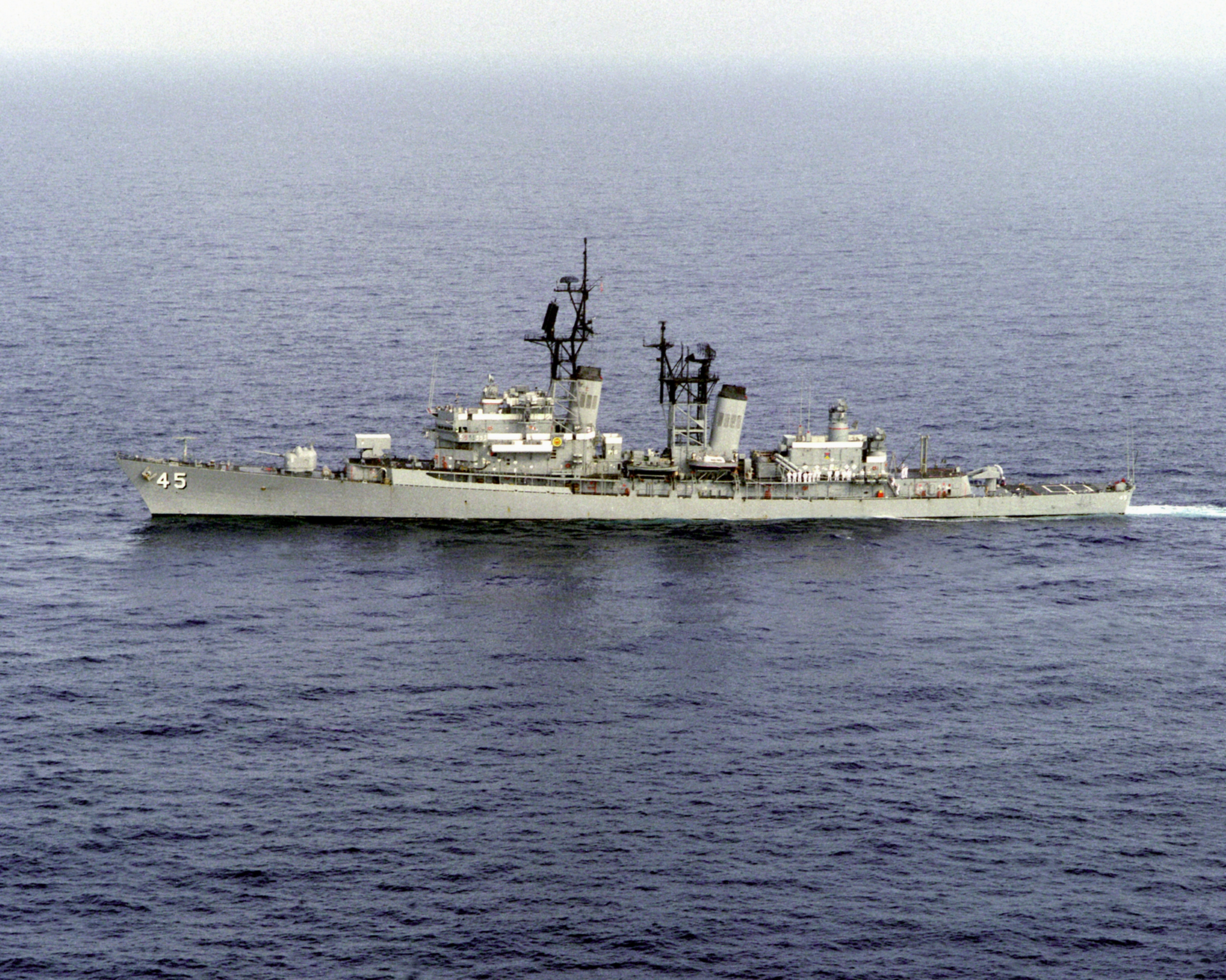
- USS Dewey (DDG-45)

History

United States
- Name: Dewey
- Namesake: George Dewey
- Builder: Bath Iron Works
- Laid down: 10 August 1957
- Launched: 30 November 1958
- Acquired: 2 December 1959
- Commissioned: 7 December 1959
- Decommissioned: 31 August 1990
- Stricken: 20 November 1992
- Identification: DLG-14/DDG-45
- Motto: Pax Propter Vim
- Fate: Sold for scrapping, 15 April 1994
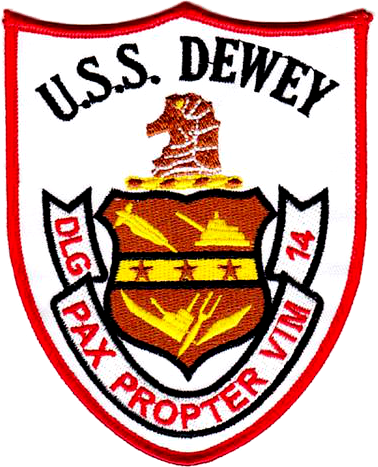
- Badge

General characteristics
- Class & type: Farragut-class guided missile destroyer
- Displacement: 5,800 tons
- Length: 512.5 ft (156.2 m)
- Beam: 52 ft (16 m)
- Draft: 25 ft (7.6 m)
- Propulsion: 4 x 1200psi boilers; 2 geared turbines
- Speed: 36.5 knots (67.6 km/h; 42.0 mph)
- Range: 4,500 nautical miles (8,300 km; 5,200 mi) at 20 knots (37 km/h; 23 mph)
- Complement: 377 (21 officers + 356 enlisted)
- Sensors & processing systems: AN/SPS-48C air-search radar; AN/SPS-49 air-search radar; AN/SPG-55B fire control radar; AN/SPG-53F gun fire control radar
- Electronic warfare & decoys: AN/SLQ-32
- Armament: 1 x Mk 42 5 in (130 mm)/54 caliber gun; Mark 46 torpedoes from two Mk-32 triple mounts; 1 x Mk 16 ASROC missile launcher; 1 x Mk 10 Mod.0 missile launcher for RIM-2 Terrier / Standard (ER) Missiles; 2 x Mk 141 Harpoon missile launchers

USS Dewey (DLG-14/DDG-45) was a Farragut-class guided missile destroyer in the United States Navy. She was named in honor of George Dewey, the United States' only Admiral of the Navy. She was the third of four ships whose namesake was Admiral Dewey. The ship's motto was The First and Finest.

== Construction and design ==
Dewey was laid down on 10 August 1957 by Bath Iron Works of Bath, Maine. She was launched on 30 November 1958, sponsored by Katherine St. George, the United States representative from New York State. Dewey was commissioned on 7 December 1959, Commander Elmo R. Zumwalt, Jr., in command. Dewey was the ninth Farragut-class destroyer (also known as the Coontz class).

Commander Zumwalt later, in 1970, became the youngest man to serve as Chief of Naval Operations.

The design of the Farragut-class destroyers was closer in size to a World War II cruiser rather than a destroyer; this type was originally termed "frigate" by the U.S. Navy. Other navies used the term "frigate" for destroyer-sized ships specialized in anti-submarine warfare; the U.S. Navy used this term for fast-carrier anti-aircraft warfare ships. The DLGs succeeded the missile-less DLs.

== Service ==
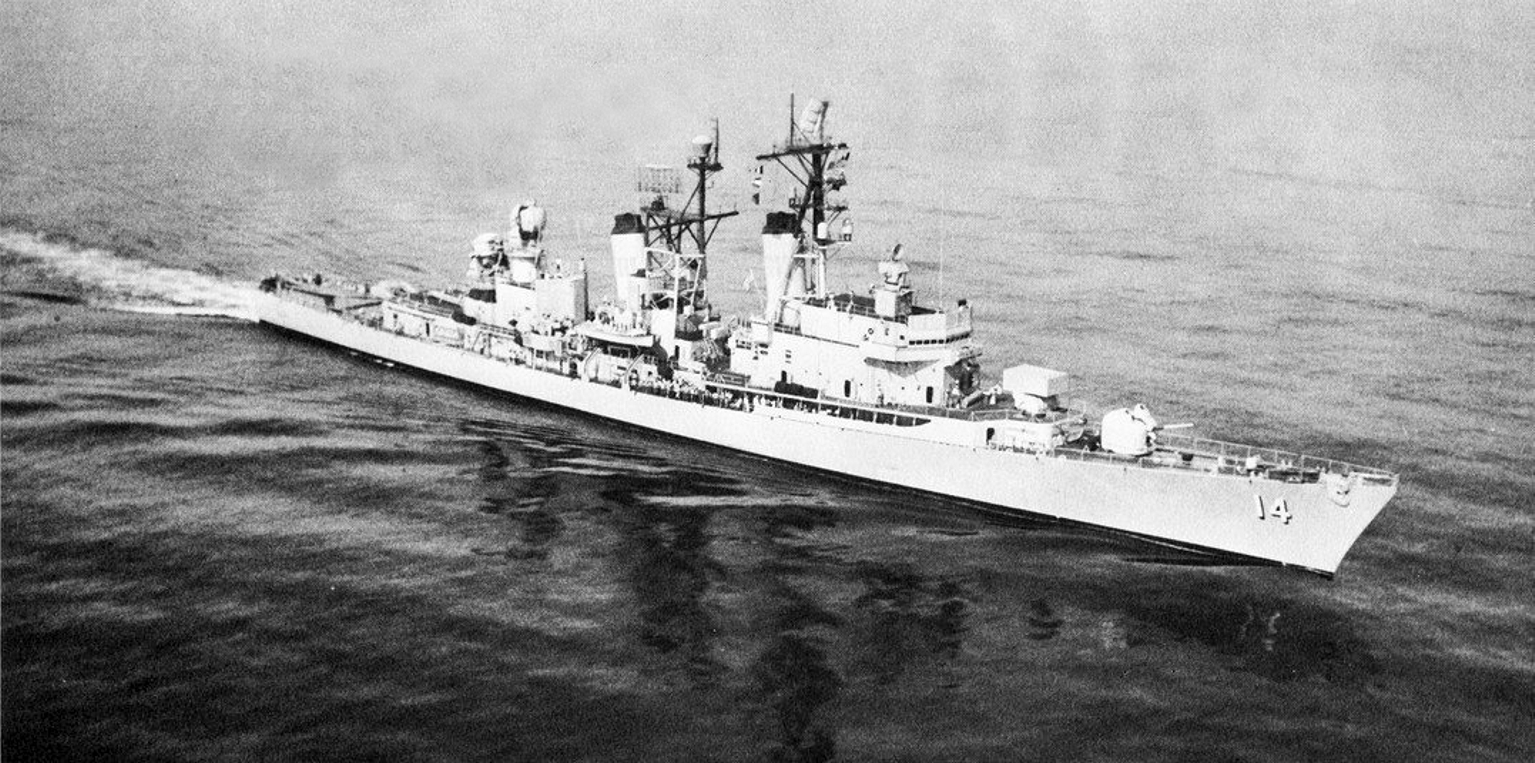
USS Dewey in 1960.

For the first sixth months of 1960, Dewey was engaged in training operations off the New England coast, the Virginia Capes, and in the Caribbean Sea, preparing Dewey for her role in the Atlantic Fleet. She was decommissioned on 21 November 1969, and recommissioned 31 March 1971. On 30 June 1975, Dewey, then commissioned as a guided missile frigate, hull number DLG-14, was reclassified as a guided missile destroyer, receiving hull number DDG-45.

== Decommissioning ==
Dewey was decommissioned 31 August 1990 and struck from the Naval Vessel Register on 20 November 1992. Dewey was sold to J&L Metals, Wilmington, North Carolina on 15 April 1994 for $255,459.43 and was scrapped shortly afterwards.
