= USS Zellars =

Allen M. Sumner-class destroyer of the United States Navy

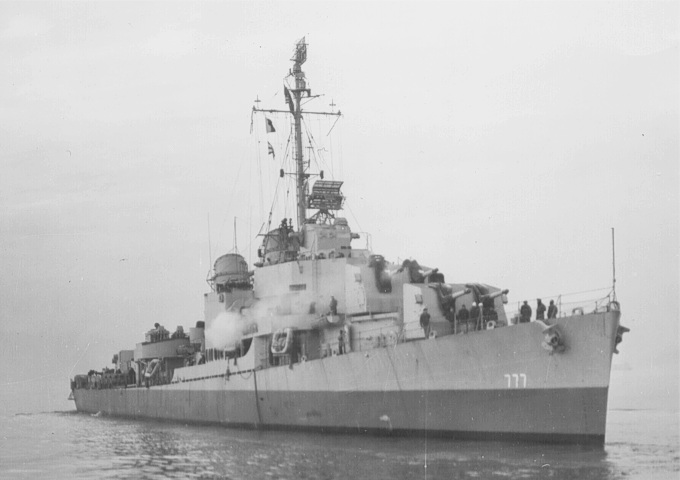
- USS Zellars (DD-777) off the Puget Sound Naval Shipyard on 23 January 1945

History

United States
- Name: Zellars
- Namesake: Lt. (j.g.) Thomas Edward Zellars
- Builder: Todd Pacific Shipyards, Seattle
- Laid down: 24 December 1943
- Launched: 19 July 1944
- Commissioned: 25 October 1944
- Decommissioned: 19 March 1971
- Stricken: 19 March 1971
- Identification: DD-777
- Fate: To Iran 12 October 1973

Iran
- Name: Babr
- Namesake: Caspian tiger
- Acquired: 19 March 1971
- Commissioned: 12 October 1973
- Identification: DDG-7 then D61
- Fate: Non-operational since 1994; to be scrapped

General characteristics
- Class & type: Allen M. Sumner-class destroyer
- Displacement: 2,200 tons
- Length: 376 ft 6 in (114.76 m)
- Beam: 40 ft (12.19 m)
- Draft: 15 ft 8 in (4.78 m)
- Propulsion: 60,000 shp (45 MW); 2 propellers
- Speed: 34 knots (63 km/h; 39 mph)
- Range: 6,500 nmi (12,000 km); at 15 knots (28 km/h)
- Complement: 336
- Armament: 6 × 5-inch (127 mm)/38 DP guns, 12 × 40 mm AA guns, 11 × 20 mm AA guns, 10 × 21-inch (533 mm) torpedo tubes, 6 × depth charge projectors, 2 × depth charge tracks

General characteristics as Babr, 1989
- Class & type: FRAM II Allen M. Summner class
- Displacement: 2,388 tons standard; 3,254 tons full
- Length: 376 ft 5 in (114.73 m)
- Beam: 41 ft (12.50 m)
- Draft: 21 ft 4 in (6.50 m)
- Propulsion: 60,000 shp (45 MW); 2 propellers
- Speed: 34 knots (63 km/h; 39 mph)
- Range: 3,740 nmi (6,930 km); at 12.5 knots (23.2 km/h)
- Complement: 290
- Sensors & processing systems: AN/SPS-29C air search radar; AN/SPS-10B surface search radar; AN/SQS-43 sonar
- Electronic warfare & decoys: AN/WLR-1 electronic support measures; AN/ULQ-6 electronic countermeasure
- Armament: 4 × Standard SM-1MR SAM launchers with 8 missiles, 4 × 5-inch (127 mm)/38 DP guns, 4 × 14.5 mm AA guns, 6 × 12.75-inch (324 mm) Mk 32 torpedo tubes for Mark 46 torpedo, 2 × Hedgehog Mk 10 ASW mortars
- Aircraft carried: 1 × Agusta AB 204AS helicopter

USS Zellars (DD-777), was an Allen M. Sumner-class destroyer that served in the United States Navy.

== Namesake ==
Thomas Edward Zellars was born on 11 August 1898 in Grantville, Georgia. He was appointed a midshipman at the United States Naval Academy on 13 June 1917 and graduated on 3 June 1920, a year early as the result of the wartime shortening of the academy's course of instruction. On 9 July 1920, he reported for duty on the USS Mississippi and rose to the rank of lieutenant (junior grade) and attained the position of turret commander in Mississippi's 14-inch Turret II.

On June 12, 1924, while the ship was engaged in gunnery practice off San Pedro, California, an explosion and fire engulfed his turret. Zellars and 47 others were asphyxiated almost immediately, but not before he turned on the flood valve that extinguished a burning powder train, an act that likely saved the ship and many of his shipmates from destruction.

== Construction and commissioning ==
Zellars was laid down on 24 December 1943 at Seattle, Washington, by the Todd-Pacific Shipyards, Inc.; launched on 19 July 1944; sponsored by Mrs. Thomas M. Zellars; and commissioned on 25 October 1944.

== World War II ==
After six weeks of shakedown training out of San Diego, California, Zellars returned north to Bremerton, Washington, for post-shakedown availability. She spent Christmas 1944 in Bremerton but, soon thereafter, got underway for Pearl Harbor and the second phase of training preparatory to her entry into combat. That training lasted until mid-March 1945 at which time she put to sea with a portion of the Okinawa invasion force. She was assigned to Task Group (TG) 54.3, a part of Rear Admiral Morton L. Deyo's Task Force 54 (TF 54), a Gunfire and Covering Force built around the old battleships. Staged through Ulithi in the Western Carolines, Zellars and her consorts arrived in the Ryukyus on 25 March. For the next week, she worked with the battleships and cruisers of TF 54, first in supporting the occupation of the roadstead at Kerama Retto and then in subjecting Okinawa itself to a systematic, long-duration, preinvasion bombardment. Because most of the targets on Okinawa were located well inland in accordance with Japan's relatively new strategy of defense in depth, Zellars' 5-inch guns usually deferred to the larger caliber batteries on board the battleships and cruisers while she provided them with antisubmarine and antiaircraft protection.

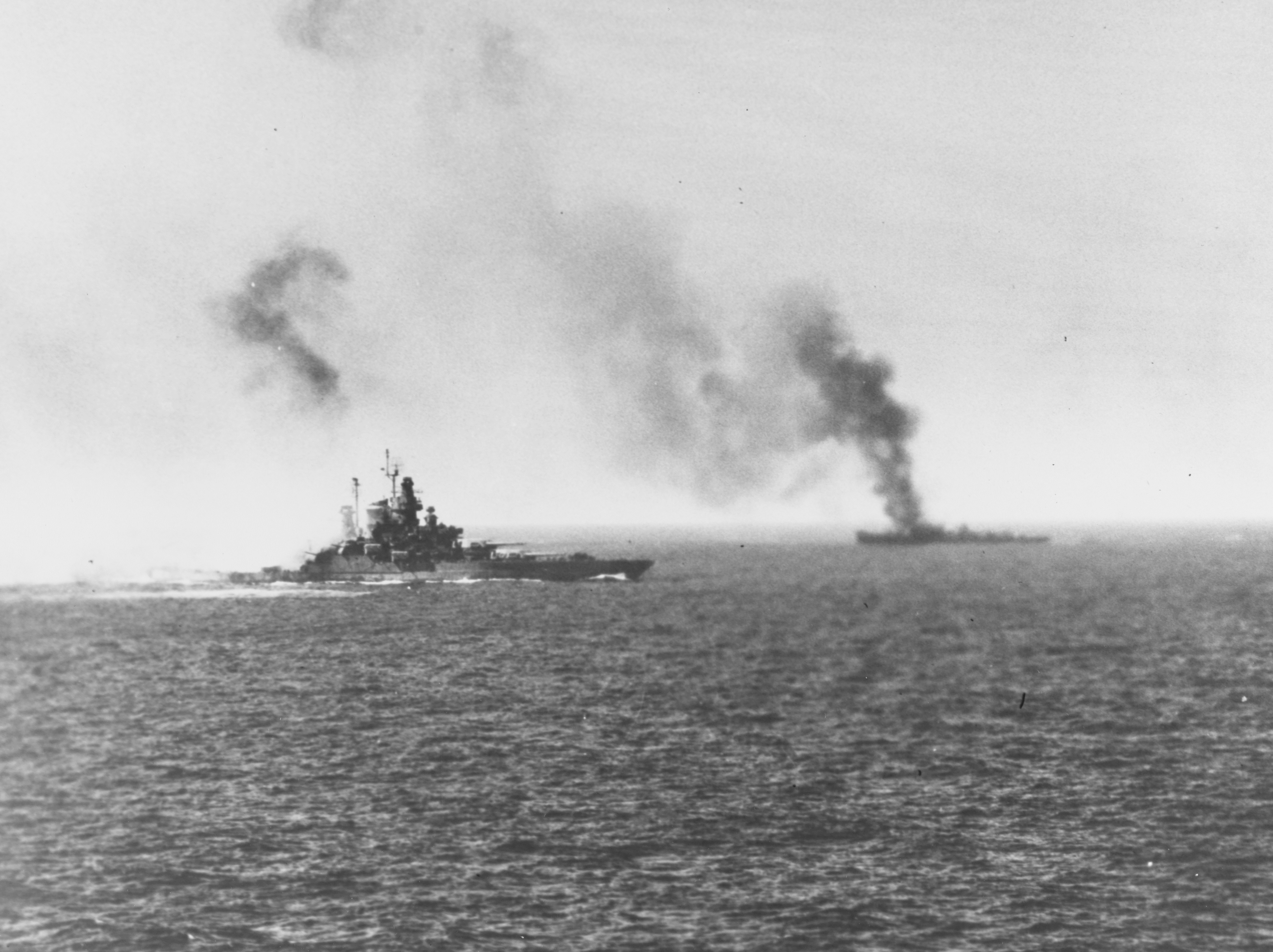
Zellars and the battleship Tennessee after both vessels had been hit by kamikazes on 12 April

After the 1 April amphibious assault of Okinawa, she continued to screen the larger ships of TG 54.3 and provided call fire in support of the troops ashore. Her combat service, however, proved extremely short; less than a month, in fact. On the afternoon of 12 April, she was screening the battleship Tennessee when three Japanese "Jills" made a coordinated attack on her. They came at the destroyer's port quarter from an altitude of about 15 feet (4.6 m) above water. Zellars rang up 25 knots (46 km/h) to unmask all batteries and opened fire. She splashed the lead attacker at a range of 1,800 yards (1,600 m) and caught the second some 3,000 yards (2,700 m) away. The destroyer then shifted fire to the third intruder and began scoring 40-millimeter hits on him. The Japanese pilot, however, pressed home his attack and crashed into Zellar's port side, forward of the bridge in her number 2 handling room. His 500-kilogram bomb tore through several light bulkheads before exploding on the starboard side of the ship in the scullery. She temporarily lost all power, and the fireroom had to be secured. Meanwhile, the after 20-millimeter guns continued to ward off additional tormentors and assisted in downing another plane. That evening, she limped into Kerama Retto with extensive damage. Zellar's lost twenty-nine men killed and thirty-seven wounded by the kamikaze strike on 12 April. After temporary patching, the destroyer headed back toward the United States and arrived at Terminal Island, California, on 1 June. During some two and one-half months in which the ship underwent repairs and overhaul, World War II ended.

== Post-war ==
Zellars conducted refresher training out of San Diego in September, transited the Panama Canal on 8 October, and entered the New York Naval Shipyard on the 16th. Following availability, the destroyer made a cruise, in company with the aircraft carrier Midway, down the Atlantic coast to Guantanamo Bay, Cuba, and thence to Culebra Island where the destroyer conducted shore bombardment practice. Upon her return to the United States, the warship received orders directing her to escort the carrier Franklin D. Roosevelt on her shakedown voyage during January and February 1946. The highlight of the voyage was an early February visit to Rio de Janeiro, Brazil, from 1 to 11 February. On the return trip, Zellars received orders detaching her from the big new carrier and sending her to Pensacola, Florida. She served there until 22 April when she got underway for Earle, New Jersey. There, Naval Academy midshipmen came on board for a summer cruise that lasted until August.

Following routine repairs and post-availability shakedown at Casco Bay, Maine, the destroyer reported for duty with the Submarine Force, Atlantic Fleet, on 4 October. During the next three months, she served as a target ship for submarines conducting torpedo training. In January and February 1947, she participated in the first major fleet tactical exercise since Fleet Problem XXI in 1940. The warship returned to Norfolk on 17 March and, for the next four months, operated along the middle Atlantic and New England coasts.

On 21 July, Zellars departed Norfolk on a deployment to European waters. She arrived in Plymouth, England, 10 days later and, for the next month, made the rounds to various British ports. Early in September, she transited the Strait of Gibraltar to begin a three-month cruise in the Mediterranean Sea. She visited Soudha Bay at Crete; Taranto, Naples, Venice, Salerno, and Trieste in Italy; and Tangiers on the North African coast. Zellars concluded her first 6th Fleet deployment upon her arrival at Boston on 1 December 1947 and entered the Boston Naval Shipyard that same day for a three-month overhaul. Following repairs, she conducted a five-week refresher cruise out of the base at Guantanamo Bay, Cuba. Zellars reentered Norfolk again on 20 April 1948 and remained there for six weeks preparing to deploy once more to the 6th Fleet. On 1 June, the destroyer set sail from Norfolk and shaped a course for the Mediterranean. Her second tour of duty with the 6th Fleet proved brief, for she returned to Norfolk early in October. For almost two years, she conducted normal 2nd Fleet operations out of Norfolk.

== Korean War ==
Late in June 1950, communist forces from North Korea moved south and invaded the Republic of Korea. As a result, Zellars departed Norfolk in August in company with the other destroyers of Destroyer Division (DesDiv) 162 and headed for the Far East. She and her division mates arrived in Yokosuka, Japan, early in October; provisioned, and set sail for Korean waters. The destroyer remained in the Korean War zone for nine months. During that time, her primary missions were gunfire support for United Nations troops ashore and coastal surveillance as well as antisubmarine protection for the larger American warships against an underwater threat that never materialized.

As soon as she arrived on station in October 1950, she took part in the opening of Wonsan harbor. Late in November, the Chinese intervened in the conflict driving the United Nations troops into a southward retreat. Zellars initially supported the retirement of a South Korean division down the east coast and then provided gunfire support to the marines in the defensive perimeter around Wonsan while the Army's 3rd Infantry Division was evacuated by sea. In mid-December, the warship moved north from Wonsan to Hŭngnam to provide gunfire support during the evacuation of another coastal enclave held by retreating United Nations forces. She remained in Korean waters for another six months after the November–December evacuations and ranged both coasts of Korea delivering gunfire in support of the ground troops and interdicting coastal logistics.

The destroyer returned to the United States in July 1951 and resumed duty with the Atlantic Fleet. Upon her return, she concentrated increasingly upon honing her antisubmarine warfare (ASW) capability. Over the next eight years, training in ASW tactics was emphasized on five extended cruises to European and Mediterranean waters and in exercises in the western Atlantic and in the Caribbean Sea.

== FRAM ==
Late in 1959, Zellars entered the Norfolk Naval Shipyard and began Mark II Fleet Rehabilitation and Modernization (FRAM) overhaul and alterations. The addition of more up-to-date equipment added years to her projected service life and greatly enhanced her ASW capability. The most noticeable change was the addition of a flight deck and stowage area for an ASW helicopter. These modifications were completed in June 1960; and the ship moved south to a new home port, Mayport, Florida. Between June 1960 and December 1965, Zellars made five deployments to European waters. Four of those assignments consisted of duty in the Mediterranean with the 6th Fleet and the remaining one involved a midshipman summer cruise to northern European ports. Her duties with the 2nd Fleet in the western Atlantic and Caribbean consisted for the most part of training and yard overhauls but were highlighted by participation in operations enforcing the Cuban quarantine in the fall of 1962 and occasional duty supporting the Polaris missile test program.

In August 1964, Zellars moved to Newport, Rhode Island, her new home port. In 1966, she remained in the western Atlantic for the entire year, breaking her training routine between mid-May and mid-September for regular overhaul at the Boston Naval Shipyard. More than half of 1967 was taken up by the NATO exercise Operation "Matchmaker III," an experiment designed to determine what problems might arise from combined operations of ships of various nations and to test solutions to those problems. The operation began in mid-January 1967 and lasted until mid-August. It took her first to the West Indies, thence across the Atlantic to the waters around northern Europe, up over the Arctic Circle and finally to the coasts of New England and Canada.

In September 1967, she resumed 2nd Fleet operations along the eastern seaboard. After completing the annual "Springboard" operation in February and preparing at Newport, Rhode Island, for overseas movement, Zellars sailed for the Mediterranean once again, putting to sea from Newport on 4 April 1968. That deployment, consisting of the usual unilateral and multinational training exercises and goodwill port visits, lasted until 27 September when she tied up at Newport once again. Following eight months of operations out of Newport, the destroyer embarked upon the last Mediterranean cruise of her career on 9 April 1969. The usual Mediterranean training and port visit routine occupied her time for the next six months.

Zellars earned one battle star during World War II and four battle stars during the Korean War.

== Iranian service ==
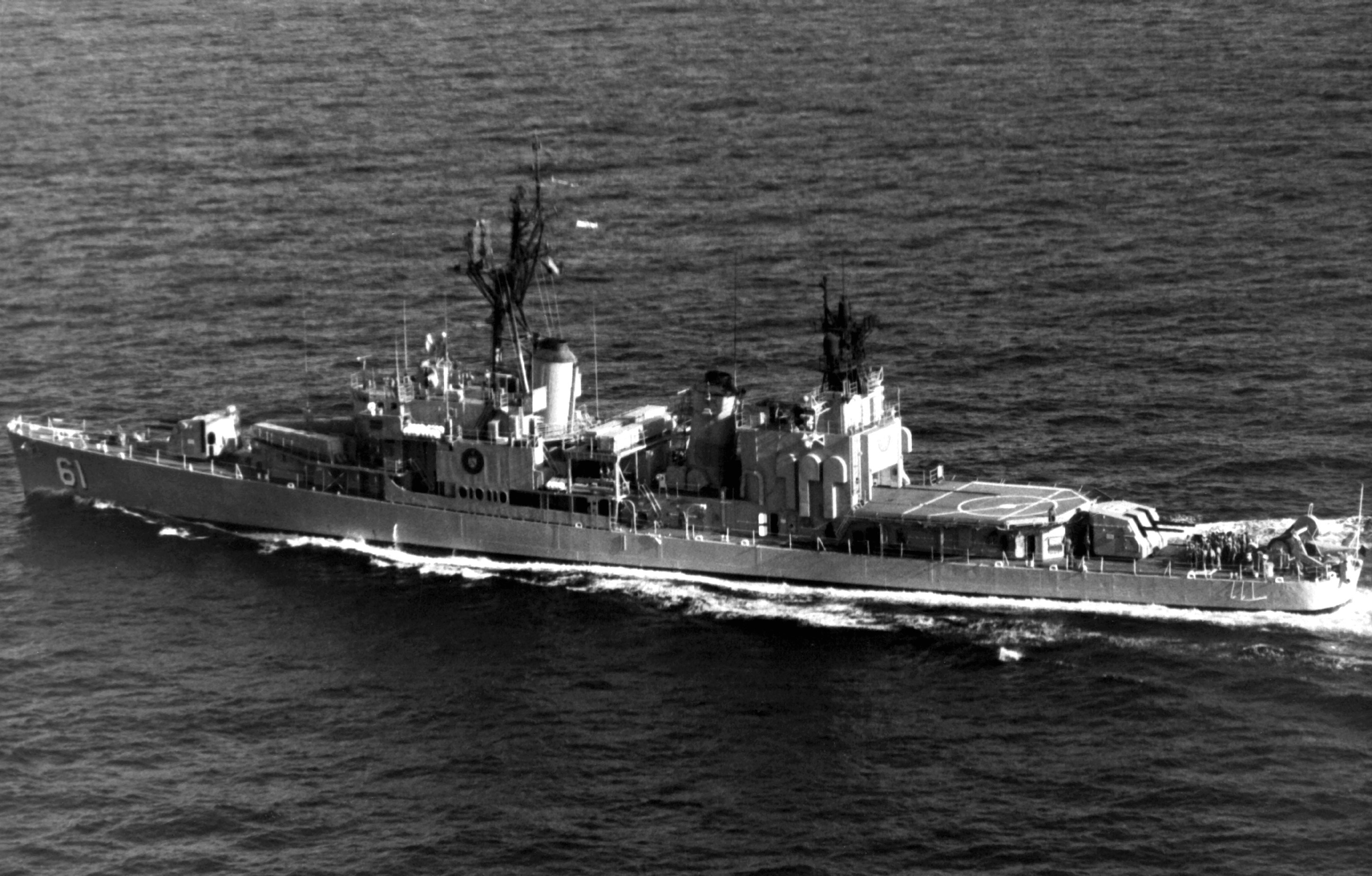
Babr in the late 1970s.

The warship returned to Newport on 10 October and, one month later, moved to New York where she became a Naval Reserve training ship. That duty constituted her mission for the remaining 16 months of her active career. Zellars was decommissioned on 19 March 1971, and her name was struck from the Navy List. Set aside for sale to the Iranian government, she was moved to the Philadelphia Naval Shipyard where she underwent extensive modification over the next 20 months. Renamed Babr (Tiger) (DDG-7), she was commissioned in the Imperial Iranian Navy on 12 October 1973 at the Philadelphia Naval Shipyard. As of 1998, she remained active with the Islamic Republic of Iran Navy, though non-operational since 1994 and awaiting scrapping.

== See also ==
- Current Iranian Navy vessels
