= USS Wrangell =

Ammunition ship of the United States Navy

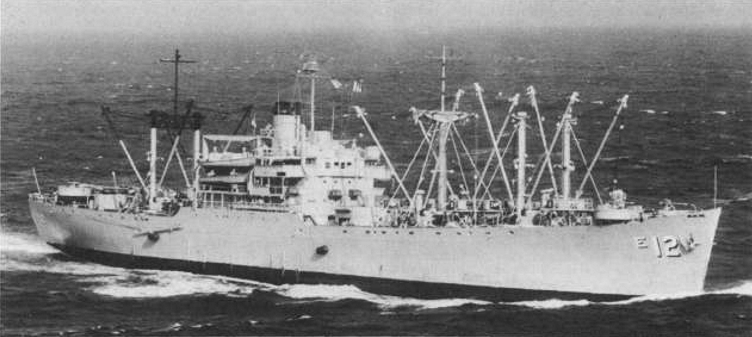
- USS Wrangall in the South China Sea, 1966.

History

United States
- Name: USS Wrangell
- Namesake: Mount Wrangell in Alaska
- Builder: North Carolina Shipbuilding Company, Wilmington, North Carolina
- Laid down: February 1944
- Launched: 14 April 1944
- Commissioned: 10 October 1944
- Decommissioned: 19 November 1946
- Recommissioned: 14 November 1951
- Decommissioned: 21 December 1970
- Stricken: 1 October 1976
- Honors and awards: 3 battle stars (World War II); 5 battle stars (Vietnam)
- Fate: Scrapped (1983)

General characteristics
- Class & type: Mount Hood-class ammunition ship
- Length: 459 ft 2 in (140 m)
- Beam: 63 ft (19.2 m)
- Draught: 28 ft 3 in (8.6 m)
- Propulsion: Geared turbine; 1 × shaft; 6,000 shp (4.5 MW)
- Speed: 16 knots (30 km/h)
- Capacity: 7,700 long tons (7,800 t) deadweight
- Complement: 267 officers and enlisted

USS Wrangell (AE-12) was laid down under a Maritime Commission contract (MC hull 1375) as SS Midnight during February 1944 at Wilmington, North Carolina, by the North Carolina Shipbuilding Company; launched on 14 April 1944; sponsored by Mrs. G. T. Cambell; delivered to the Navy, incomplete, on 28 May 1944; moved to Hampton Roads; converted to an ammunition ship by the Norfolk Shipbuilding and Drydock Co.; and commissioned on 10 October 1944 at the Norfolk Navy Yard.

== Service history ==
=== World War II, 1944–1945 ===
Following shakedown in Hampton Roads, Wrangell sailed on 13 November for the Naval Ammunition Depot, Earle, New Jersey, to load ammunition. Escorted by the destroyer Borie (DD-704), she stood out to sea on the last day of the month and headed for the Panama Canal. The ammunition ship transited the isthmian waterway on 7 December; and, although initially ordered to proceed directly to the Marshall Islands, was rerouted to Hawaii.

Wrangell arrived at Pearl Harbor on 21 December, but got underway again on Christmas Eve, bound for the Marshalls. Arriving at Eniwetok on the last day of 1944, the ammunition ship joined a Ulithi-bound convoy (number 31) that day and pushed on for the Carolines. Wrangell dropped anchor in Ulithi Lagoon on 5 January and reported for duty to Commander, Service Squadron 10. Over the next five months, Wrangell operated from Ulithi supporting the Fleet's operations against Iwo Jima, Okinawa, and the Japanese home islands. In those months, she transferred over, 10,000 tons of all types of ammunition to combatant ships steaming alongside while underway and would frequently serve two ships at a time: heavy ships (battleships, aircraft carriers, and heavy cruisers) alongside to port and light units (light cruisers and destroyers) alongside to starboard.

On her first operation, Wrangell reached Iwo Jima on 22 February and supplied bombardment forces there with ammunition over the next six days until she retired from the area on the 28th. The nature of operations at Iwo, coupled with the deep waters relatively close inshore, prevented the ship's anchoring and necessitated conducting cargo operations while either drifting or underway at slow speed.

After retiring from Iwo Jima on 28 February, Wrangell proceeded to the Marianas and arrived at Saipan on 3 March. From that island, she proceeded independently to Ulithi where she anchored three days later. On the 13th, the ammunition ship sortied with Task Group (TG) 58.8 and supported Task Force (TF) 58 over the ensuing days as it attacked enemy shore installations and shipping in preparation for the invasion of the Ryūkyūs and hit Okinawa itself when troops finally landed on that island on 1 April.

Between 22 March and 18 April, Wrangell rearmed over 50 combatant ships. On the 19th, in company with Task Unit (TU) 50.8.6, the ship was detached from TG 50.8 at sea and proceeded south to Ulithi, arriving there on 22 April.

However, with the Okinawa campaign at its height, her respite from operations proved to be a short one. Admiral Mitscher's task force was daily striking the Japanese-held islands of the Nansei Shoto and along the coast of the Japanese home islands, and required replenishment. Thus, after 10 days of round-the-clock reloading, Wrangell departed Ulithi on 2 May and, three days later, rendezvoused with TG 50.8 southeast of Okinawa. From 6 May to 1 June, Wrangell passed ammunition "to all comers" – rearming as many as a dozen ships a day – and she filled the magazines of over 50 in the three-week period.

She then retired to San Pedro Bay, Leyte, in the Philippines, for upkeep and repairs. Wrangell subsequently returned to the open sea on 8 July and rendezvoused with TG 30.8 (the redesignated TG 50.8) on the 17th. From 20 July to 1 August, she rearmed 35 ships and hit a high point of transferring 700 tons of ammunition in a single day.

Wrangell was detached from TG 30.8 on 2 August and headed south for the Philippines. Arriving at San Pedro Bay on 6 August, the ship immediately commenced replenishing her stocks of ammunition. Work was interrupted on 10 August, though, when the fleet received the news that Japan was willing to surrender. Cargo operations were secured that night, as all hands eagerly awaited news about Japan's future actions.

=== Post-war activities, 1945–1946 ===
After Japan capitulated, Wrangell paused briefly in Tokyo Bay to take part in the initial phase of the occupation of the erstwhile enemy's home islands, before she pushed on for the Philippines and, ultimately, home, that autumn. Departing Philippine waters on 25 October, Wrangell steamed via Pearl Harbor, reached the coast of Panama on 21 November, and transited the canal later that day. She subsequently unloaded ammunition and ordnance supplies at Earle, N.J., and headed for the Gulf of Mexico on 16 January 1946. She arrived at Orange, Texas, five days later, and was ultimately placed in reserve on 17 May. She was decommissioned and laid up at Orange on 19 November 1946.

=== 1951–1953 ===
The outbreak of war in Korea in the summer of 1950 prompted the Navy to recall many inactive ships from the "mothball" fleet. Wrangell was one of them and was recommissioned on 14 November 1951 at Orange, Capt. Olin P. Thomas in command. The ammunition ship shifted to New York, her new home port, and arrived there on 21 December. She soon headed south to Norfolk for an administrative inspection and repairs alongside a tender.

Wrangell loaded ammunition at Earle, N.J., between 23 May and 18 June after operating out of Boston and Newport, Rhode Island, for a time, and in June, once more conducting underway training evolutions out of Newport. In the summer, she participated in exercises at Onslow Beach, North Carolina, and at Newport before taking part in Operation Noramex in the North Atlantic. These replenishment exercises conducted off the coast of Labrador were her first since World War II.

=== Mediterranean, 1953–1960 ===
Wrangell made her first deployment to the Mediterranean between January and June 1953, touching at ports that ranged from Gibraltar to Bizerte, Tunisia; Marseille to Golfe Juan, France; from Augusta, Sicily, to Bari, Italy; and from Oran, French Morocco, to Taranto, Italy, before she returned to New York on 10 July, via Gibraltar.

After local operations and repairs, Wrangell sailed for her second Mediterranean deployment in the autumn. At 1014 on 4 October 1953 – while en route from Reykjavík, Iceland, to Bizerte, Tunisia, in company with the oiler Aucilla (AO-56) – the ammunition ship sighted a fishing vessel flying international distress signals. Wrangell maneuvered near the drifting vessel and lowered a boat with a boarding party, Ens. P. R. Frosell in charge. Wrangell's men found the fishing boat, Jules Verne (registered at Douarnenez, France), to have wreckage strewn about topside and two feet of water in her engine compartment. The investigation also revealed the only living occupant of the craft to be a dog; the boarding party also found the corpse of a man estimated to have been dead for five days. Leaving food and water for the dog, the boarding party soon returned to the ship, and Wrangell took Jules Verne under tow. At 1403 the next day, 5 October, Jules Verne began to founder, however, and sank eight minutes later; the dog, swimming in the water, was hauled on board Wrangell, whose crew adopted the animal and made him the ship's mascot.

Ultimately arriving at Bizerte on 9 October, Wrangell operated with the 6th Fleet only briefly, touching at Cagliari, Sardinia; Taranto, Italy; Suda Bay, Crete; Phaleron Bay, Greece; and Naples, Italy, before returning via Gibraltar to New York and the naval ammunition depot at Earle.

Wrangell conducted three more Mediterranean deployments into the late 1950s, supplying 6th Fleet warships with ammunition. There were notable highlights during those deployments: in the autumn of 1956, during the Suez Crisis, Wrangell supported the units of the 6th Fleet evacuating American nationals from the troubled area.

In mid-July 1958, President Dwight D. Eisenhower ordered marines to land in Lebanon to protect American lives and property. During the intervention, Wrangell participated in the 6th Fleet's operations, visiting Beirut four times in August and September, after which time the ship proceeded to Naples, arriving there on 15 September.

In between Mediterranean deployments, Wrangell's area of operations ranged from Charleston, South Carolina, to Holy Loch, Scotland; and from the Virginia Capes to Guantánamo Bay, Cuba. During her operations, she conducted underway rearming experiments with a number of ships, including the then-new aircraft carrier Forrestal (CV-59) and the guided missile cruiser Boston (CAG-1).

=== 1960–1965 ===
Wrangell continued alternating local operations off the eastern seaboard with Caribbean and Mediterranean deployments into the late 1960s. The ship's first replenishment of a nuclear-powered warship came on 17 August 1962, when she rearmed the nuclear-powered aircraft carrier Enterprise (CVN-65).

In the autumn of 1962, after the discovery by reconnaissance aircraft of Soviet missiles in Cuba, President John F. Kennedy instituted a naval blockade of Cuba to turn back Russian ships that attempted to deliver more missiles and their support equipment to Cuban ports. During the crisis, Wrangell spent 35 days in the Caribbean, arming and rearming various units of the blockade force. Ultimately, the Russians removed the missiles from Cuba and thus eased the tension.

Wrangell conducted three more Mediterranean deployments in the first half of the 1960s and, between those deployments, conducted local operations on the eastern seaboard and into the Caribbean. After successive home-port changes over the years – from New York to Naples to Norfolk to Charleston – Wrangell was preparing for her 10th Mediterranean deployment when orders came directing her to sail for the Far East and her first service in the Pacific since World War II. She had been loading ammunition at Earle, N.J., for a week when the message arrived on 28 August rerouting her from the Mediterranean to the Pacific. The ship departed Charleston on 27 September 1965 in response to the critical need in the Southeast Asian area for ammunition ships, in keeping with the escalating nature of the war in Vietnam.

=== Vietnam, 1965–1970 ===
Transiting the Panama Canal on 2 October, Wrangell arrived at Pearl Harbor on the 19th, where she loaded additional ammunition. She soon sailed for Southeast Asian waters and, operating out of Subic Bay, Philippines, and making seven stints to the "line", provided ammunition for ships operating on both the Yankee and Dixie Stations into the spring of 1966. During her five months in WestPac, Wrangell transferred over 6,800 tons of ammunition in 74 underway replenishments. In addition, besides ammunition, the ship delivered fleet freight, mail, transient personnel, movies, and, on two occasions, fresh water and provisions. Arriving back at Subic Bay after her seventh mission on the "line", Wrangell departed Philippine waters on 2 May.

On 21 June, Wrangell arrived back at Charleston, via Singapore; Bombay, India; the Suez Canal; Beirut, Lebanon; and Barcelona, Spain; thus completing a circumnavigation of the globe. Wrangell remained in the vicinity of Charleston for the remainder of the year, entering the Charleston division of the Jacksonville Shipyard Co. on 10 October 1966 for a major overhaul.

On 15 May 1967, Wrangell departed Charleston, bound again for the Mediterranean – arriving to "in-chop" to the 6th Fleet at about the time of the outbreak of the Six Day War. She supported the 6th Fleet during that crisis situation and, after the abatement of the conflict, resumed routine operations – underway replenishments, alternated with port visits, "showing the flag" at ports like Corfu, Greece; Suda Bay, Crete; İzmir, Turkey; and Palma, Majorca.

Wrangell left the Mediterranean on 13 January 1968, departing Rota, Spain, on that day and sailing for the east coast of the United States. Arriving back at Charleston 10 days later, the ship provided services that spring and exercised in various phases of training or upkeep. After short periods at the Naval Weapons Stations at Charleston, South Carolina, and Yorktown, Virginia – where ammunition was transferred and the crew was indoctrinated to the special elements of weapons handling – Wrangell spent much time in drills and exercises to implement in-port training.

Following upkeep and repair periods at the Charleston Naval Shipyard during April and May 1968, Wrangell prepared for her upcoming WestPac deployment. On 4 September 1968, the ship got underway; transited the Panama Canal; spent five days at Pearl Harbor; and, after evading Typhoon Paye off Wake Island, arrived at Subic Bay on 16 October. She soon departed Subic Bay for the coast of North Vietnam and employment on the Yankee Station.

Wrangell finished out the year with three operating-periods off the coast of Vietnam and in the Tonkin Gulf. The largest underway replenishments were conducted with ships such as the battleship USS New Jersey and the carriers USS Constellation and USS Ranger. In addition, she armed many smaller units – destroyers, guided missile destroyers, and Coast Guard cutters. One of the latter, USCGC Winnebago, sent her whaleboat across to Wrangell on 21 November while off the Mekong Delta in what Wrangell's command history termed "what may well be history's smallest rearming." Winnebago's request: five rounds of 5-inch ammunition! The rearming of the USCGC Winnebago was the determining activity which placed the USS Wrangell and its entire crew on the ship AT THAT TIME on the Veterans Administration list of ships whose crew was "presumed to be exposed to the effects of Agent Orange. That determination was published Veterans Day 2012.

Only two days later, on 23 November, Wrangell and other American and South Vietnamese naval vessels took part in a search and rescue mission in the South China Sea. Despite the winds and heavy seas of Typhoon Mamie, the ship located the Indian vessel Laxmi Jayanti, helpless due to a steering casualty. Ultimately, after making temporary repairs, the Indian ship resumed her voyage, under escort, to Saigon. Wrangell, her part in the search completed, headed for Subic Bay.

While en route back from Subic Bay to Yankee Station, the ship received the nod for another mercy mission. On 3 December, Wrangell reversed course on orders from Commander, Naval Forces, Philippines, and rendezvoused with the freighter SS American Pilot, sending over a corpsman in the ship's motor whaleboat to assist a sailor who had suffered an arm wound that was bleeding profusely. After her corpsman had stanched the bleeding and given sufficient help to enable the man to be safely transferred to a shore facility for further treatment, Wrangell continued on for Yankee Station. She subsequently spent Christmas in Hong Kong and later returned to the waters off the coast of Vietnam. There, she engaged in nearly continuous rearmings of a host of ships, including the attack carriers, Ranger, Constellation, and the veteran USS Hancock, with Task Force 77. These operations were part of the ship's regular routine that alternated load-in operations at Subic Bay with replenishment work during line deployments in the South China Sea and Tonkin Gulf.

The end of January 1969 found the ship enjoying a temporary pause in her hectic schedule, undergoing a period of tender overhaul alongside the repair ship USS Ajax at Sasebo, Japan. Returning to Subic Bay soon thereafter, Wrangell loaded ammunition to return to the "line", in February.

After a series of routine rearmings near the Demilitarized Zone (DMZ), rough weather and high seas frustrated several attempts by the destroyer USS George K. MacKenzie to come alongside. Since the destroyer's magazines were low, the need to replenish her stocks was urgent; so Wrangell and George K. MacKenzie anchored inside the sheltered lee of Cam Ranh Bay to effect the transfer. While nearby patrol craft periodically dropped antiswimmer charges and kept a lookout for possible Viet Cong interference in the operation, the job was completed in two hours. As the ship's history for the year stated: "For Wrangell, the Camranh Bay episode was the closest she had ever brought her thousands of tons of ammunition to hostile fire. All hands breathed a sigh of relief when the exciting, risky rearming of the MacKenzie was over."

Back in Subic Bay on 10 April, Wrangell turned over ammunition ship duties to USS Mazama and headed for home two days later. However, before she could complete the voyage, North Korean fighters shot down an EC-121 reconnaissance plane over the Sea of Japan. The resulting crisis saw a show of American naval force in that area – a presence that Wrangell supported.

Wrangell transported ammunition from Sasebo to Yokosuka to Sasebo again before heading for Pearl Harbor on 3 May. During her recently completed deployment, she had supplied ammunition to ships ranging from the battleship New Jersey to the Coast Guard cutter USCGC Ingham, transferring nearly 12,000 tons of that necessary commodity. Port visits included Subic Bay, Hong Kong, Singapore, Sasebo, Yokosuka, Pearl Harbor, Acapulco and the Panama Canal before the ship eventually arrived back at her home port, Charleston, on 10 June 1969.

After repairs and underway training evolutions during the summer, Wrangell departed Charleston on 6 October, standing down the Cooper River, bound for what proved to be the ship's last Mediterranean deployment.

=== Decommissioning ===
Returning to the east coast, the veteran ammunition ship was decommissioned at Norfolk on 21 December 1970. Initially placed in reserve at Charleston, Wrangell was transferred to the Inactive Ship Facility at Norfolk in late February 1971 and was subsequently placed in the National Defense Reserve Fleet, James River berthing area, in the temporary custody of the Maritime Administration, on 29 April 1971. Wrangell was struck from the Navy List on 1 October 1976 and was awaiting final disposition in June 1979.

== Awards ==
Wrangell earned three battle stars for her World War II service and a further five for her performance in the Vietnam War.
