= Robert Tills =

United States Navy officer

Robert George Tills
- Ensign Robert Tills in his Navy Whites.
- Born: 9 March 1918; Manitowoc, Wisconsin
- Died: 8 December 1941 (aged 23); Malalag Bay, Mindanao, Philippines
- Burial place: Arlington National Cemetery
- Military career
- Allegiance: United States of America
- Branch: United States Navy
- Service years: 1937–1941
- Rank: Ensign
- Conflicts: World War II: Battle of the Philippines

Robert George Tills (9 March 1918 – 8 December 1941) was an officer and pilot of the United States Navy who became the first American naval officer killed during the Battle of the Philippines and had a ship named after him in his honor. His body was lost at sea during the battle and was recovered in November 2007 and officially identified in December 2008. He was buried at Arlington National Cemetery on 23 March 2009 with full military honors.

== Career ==
On 24 May 1937, Robert Tills enlisted in the Naval Reserves as a Seaman Second Class and reported for active duty on 14 June. He was appointed an aviation cadet on 3 August 1938, and reported for flight training at the Naval Air Station in Pensacola, Florida.

On 18 September 1939, 17 days after World War II began in Europe, Tills was commissioned as an ensign in the Naval Reserve and assigned to Patrol Wing 2, Patrol Squadron 21. On 14 April 1941, Tills was upgraded to regular Navy status and commissioned as an Ensign. At this time, Tills was flying patrols with Patrol Wing 10 from USS Langley (CV-1) in the Philippines. With the threat of war imminent, Tills was assigned to USS William B. Preston (AVD-7) stationed in Malalag Bay, Philippines. William B. Preston served as a base for three PBY Catalinas tasked with patrolling the eastern parts of the Celebes Sea, one of which was flown by Tills.

Early on 8 December 1941, William B. Preston received a radio dispatch: "Japan started hostilities; govern yourselves accordingly." Preston and her planes prepared for war. One Catalina took off immediately to search for Japanese ships in the area while Tills and the other Catalina stayed in the waters of Malalag Bay, ready to take off.

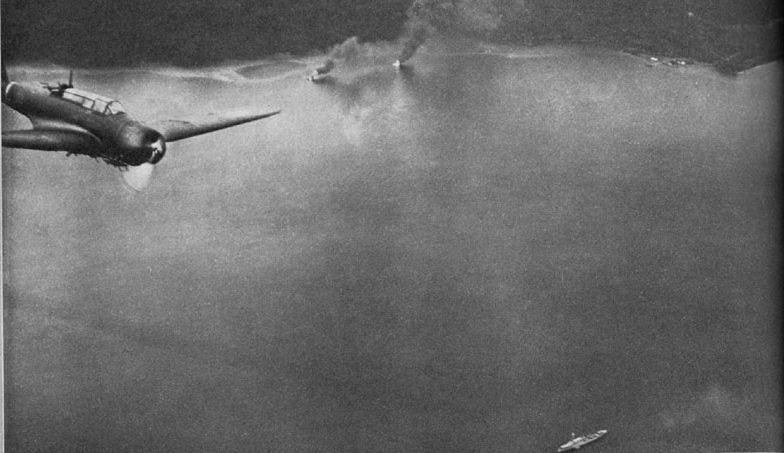
Japanese Nakajima B5N1 over seaplane tender USS William B. Preston (AVD-7) in Malalag Bay on December 8. Two burning PBY-4 are offshore in the background.

Shortly before 8:00 am, nine Mitsubishi A5M4 "Claudes" escorting 13 Nakajima B5N1 "Kate" from the Japanese carrier Ryujo approached Malalag Bay from Davao Gulf. Ignoring USS William B. Preston, they strafed the two helpless Catalinas 101-P-4 and 101-P-7 from VP-101. Ensign Robert Tills was killed by enemy fire while on board his Catalina. The rest of the crew escaped unharmed, and the Catalina sank to the bottom of the bay with Tills's remains still on board. Robert Tills's body was not found, and he joined a list with 78,000 other Americans missing in action during World War II.

== Discovery of remains ==
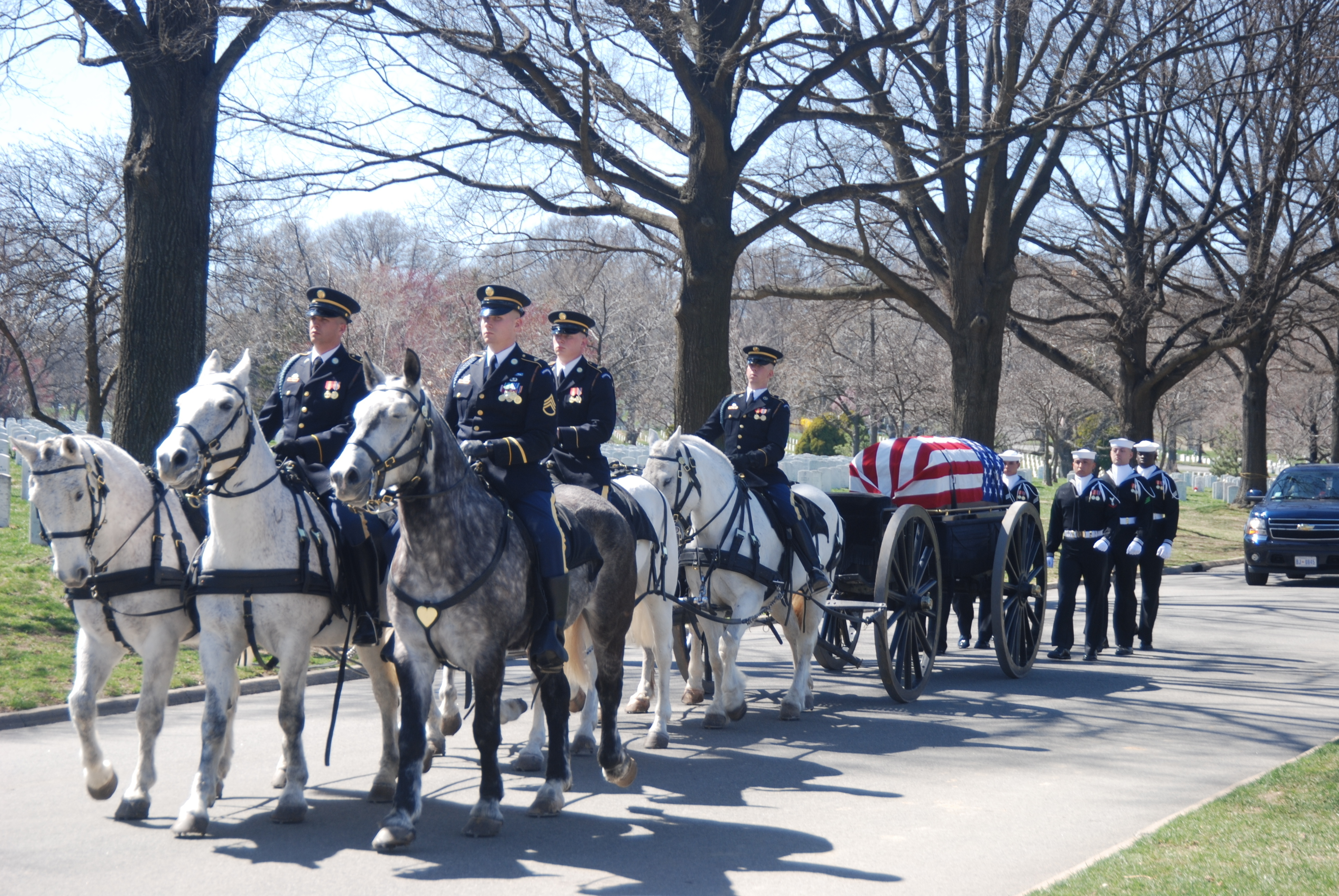
Funeral of Robert Tills at Arlington National Cemetery

In October 2007, the Joint POW/MIA Accounting Command (JPAC) was notified by authorities in the Philippines that aircraft wreckage bearing the markings "PBY-4" had been found in Malalag Bay. The next month, a JPAC team, along with the Joint U.S. Military Assistance Group-Philippines and the Philippines Coast Guard (PCG), surveyed the site and discovered the wreckage of the Catalina and recovered Robert Tills's remains. He was later identified through the use of dental records.

On 1 December 2008, the Department of Defense POW/Missing Personnel Office (DPMO) announced that they had identified the remains of Ensign Robert Tills and would be returning his remains to his family for burial with full military honors. Ensign Robert Tills was buried at Arlington National Cemetery on 23 March 2009.

== See also ==
- List of people who disappeared mysteriously at sea
