= USS Tills =

Cannon-class destroyer escort

Coordinates: 36.9603°N 75.3782°W

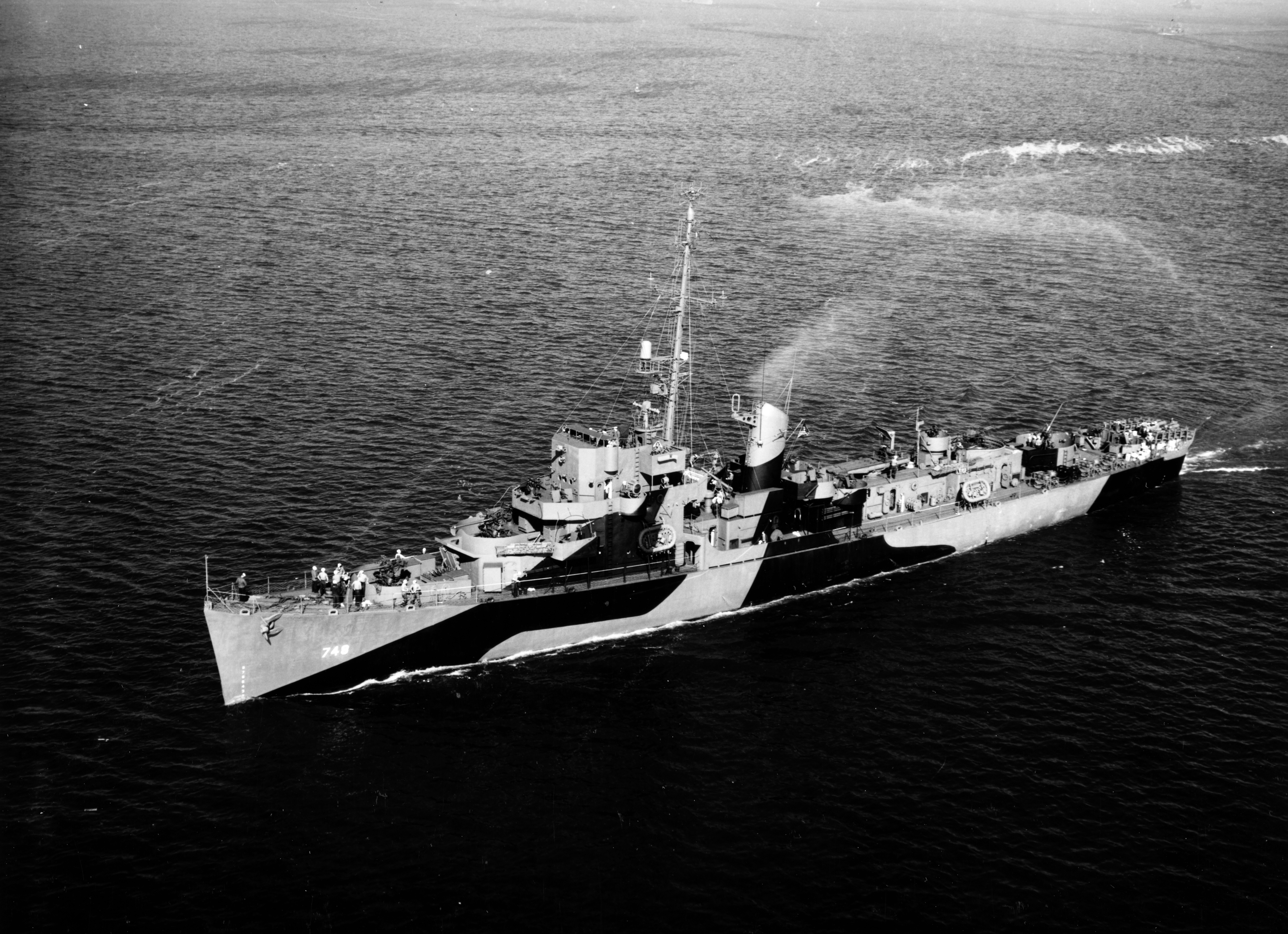
- Tills on 11 October 1944

History

United States
- Name: USS Tills
- Namesake: Ensign Robert Tills
- Builder: Western Pipe and Steel Company
- Laid down: 23 June 1943
- Launched: 3 October 1943
- Sponsored by: Helen Irene Tills, sister of Robert Tills
- Commissioned: 8 August 1944
- Decommissioned: June 1946
- Recommissioned: 21 November 1950
- Decommissioned: 18 October 1959
- Recommissioned: 1 October 1961
- Decommissioned: 23 September 1968
- Stricken: 23 September 1968
- Home port: Portland, Maine
- Fate: Sunk as target off Virginia, 3 April 1969

General characteristics
- Class & type: Cannon-class destroyer escort
- Displacement: 1,240 long tons (1,260 t) standard; 1,620 long tons (1,646 t) full
- Length: 306 ft (93 m) o/a; 300 ft (91 m) w/l
- Beam: 36 ft 10 in (11.23 m)
- Draft: 11 ft 8 in (3.56 m)
- Propulsion: 4 × GM Mod. 16-278A diesel engines with electric drive, 6,000 shp (4,474 kW), 2 screws
- Speed: 21 knots (39 km/h; 24 mph)
- Range: 10,800 nmi (20,000 km) at 12 kn (22 km/h; 14 mph)
- Complement: 15 officers and 201 enlisted
- Armament: 3 × single Mk.22 3"/50 caliber guns; 1 × twin 40 mm Mk.1 AA gun; 8 × 20 mm Mk.4 AA guns; 3 × 21-inch (533 mm) torpedo tubes; 1 × Hedgehog Mk.10 anti-submarine mortar (144 rounds); 8 × Mk.6 depth charge projectors; 2 × Mk.9 depth charge tracks

USS Tills (DE-748) was a Cannon-class destroyer escort in service with the United States Navy from 1944 to 1946 and from 1950 to 1968. She was sunk as a target in 1969.

== History ==
USS Tills was named in honor of Robert George Tills who was the first American naval officer killed in the defense of the Philippines. The ship was laid down on 23 June 1943 at San Pedro, Los Angeles, by the Western Pipe and Steel Company; launched on 3 October 1943; sponsored by Miss Helen Irene Tills, the sister of the late Ensign Tills; and commissioned on 8 August 1944.

=== World War II ===
Tills was assigned to Escort Division (CortDiv) 53 and conducted trials and shakedown off San Diego, California, before post-shakedown availability at Terminal Island. On 16 October, the ship departed the west coast in the screen for Task Group (TG) 19.5, which included escort carriers Makin Island (CVE-93), Lunga Point (CVE-94), Salamaua (CVE-96), and Bismarck Sea (CVE-95). She reached Pearl Harbor on the 23rd and took part in anti-submarine operations in Hawaiian waters for the remainder of 1944.

On 2 January 1945, Tills departed Pearl Harbor for exercises with Task Group (TG) 12.3, before the hunter-killer group headed for the Marshalls. Arriving at Eniwetok on 15 January, the destroyer escort remained there a fortnight before beginning exercises on the 29th.

Tills weighed anchor on 5 February for a hunter-killer mission. In this, like the other operations staged from the Marshalls, the ship sailed easterly by day and westerly by night to a distance some 400 miles (640 km) east of Eniwetok. Her patrolling of this stretch of the Pacific between the Hawaiian Islands and the Marshalls continued for 10 days before Tills returned to Pearl Harbor for availability alongside tender Alcor (AD-34).

The ship conducted post-availability exercises off Oahu before screening for Sangamon (CVE-26) in late February, while the escort carrier's planes carried out night flight training operations. Returning to Pearl Harbor on 2 March, the ship two days later joined TG 19.3, formed around Kasaan Bay (CVE-69). Two five-day training cruises followed, before Tills was briefly reassigned to TG 19.2, whose nucleus was Tripoli (CVE-64).

After routine training and availability at Pearl Harbor, the destroyer escort embarked 2 Navy officers and 23 Navy and Marine enlisted men for transportation to the Marshalls. On 29 March, she rendezvoused with destroyer escorts Gilligan (DE-508) and Whitman (DE-24) which helped her to screen a 17-ship convoy, PD-355T, to Eniwetok. After making port on 6 April, Tills rejoined TG 12.3, which conducted hunter-killer operations between the Hawaiian Islands and the Marshalls.

Following her 14 April return to Eniwetok, the escort ship remained with TG 12.3, steaming on anti-submarine patrols east of the Marshalls. On 20 April, a typhoon upset the group's routine by grounding Corregidor's aircraft and pitching the small destroyer escorts in the heavy seas and 70-knot (130 km/h) winds. The storm finally abated three days later, and the battered task group returned to Eniwetok.

Designated Task Unit (TU) 96.6.7, Tills departed the Marshalls on 30 April and arrived at Ulithi on 3 May. Two days later, the destroyer escort rendezvoused with UOK-9 and screened that convoy to the Ryūkyūs. En route to Okinawa, Tills sighted an abandoned Japanese patrol boat and sank the vessel with gunfire and depth charges.

Dropping anchor off Hagushi Beach on 10 May, the destroyer escort got underway soon thereafter and relieved Starling (AM-64) on screening duty in the transport area. On the 12th, Tills went to general quarters upon learning that enemy aircraft had been sighted. Spotting two planes emerging from a smoke screen, her gunners opened fire with the 40-millimeter battery before a sharp-eyed lookout noted that the planes were "friendly". The Bofors guns ceased firing immediately, and the aircraft flew away undamaged.

Following her duties with the transport screen off Okinawa, Tills was assigned to the screen of Carrier Division 22 which contained escort carriers Santee (CVE-29), Chenango (CVE-28), and Block Island (CVE-106). As these small carriers steamed toward Sakishima, their planes loaded bombs and prepared to launch. Their target, Sakishima, had been serving as a refueling base for Japanese aircraft shuttling between Kyūshū and Formosa and was thus an important link in the chain of airbases which supplied Japan's dreaded kamikaze offensive with its deadly aircraft. Tills served as antisubmarine screen and plane guard for these strikes which commenced on 1 June. The group returned to Kerama Retto to rearm and refuel before proceeding northward on 20 June for further strikes.

Four days later, the destroyer escort returned to hunter-killer operations and maintained antisubmarine patrols on a continuous basis until making port at Ulithi for availability alongside repair ship Oahu (ARG-5). For the remainder of July and into August, Tills continued antisubmarine operations on the sea lanes converging in the Western Caroline basin.

As the war progressed to its conclusion in the Pacific, Tills commenced a needed availability at Guam. While in Apra Harbor, the destroyer escort received word that an atomic bomb had been dropped on Hiroshima, Japan, on 6 August. As Tills entered dry-dock ABSD-6 three days later for repairs to her sonar dome, a second atomic blast hit Nagasaki. While the destroyer escort was docked, in company with Torrance (AKA-76), Roberts (DE-749), and SS A. McKensie, airwaves brought the welcome news that Japan had surrendered on 15 August. The long Pacific war was over.

After remaining at Apra Harbor until 29 August, the destroyer escort headed for Saipan which she reached later that day. She remained there for almost a month. On 24 September, she was assigned to duty with Transport Squadron 12 at Buckner Bay, Okinawa.

Following her arrival at Nagasaki with transports bringing American occupation forces, Tills made two round trips between Nagasaki and Manila before making port at Saipan on 21 October, ending the initial leg of her homeward-bound voyage. Two days later, in company with three sister ships, the remainder of CortDiv 53. Tills weighed anchor, headed for Hawaii, and reached Pearl Harbor on 31 October. Tills departed Hawaiian waters on 2 November, bound for the west coast. En route, the ship received word that a large transport plane had crashed into the sea off Oahu, and she was ordered to aid in the search for possible survivors. Of the eight people rescued, Tills picked up two and soon transferred them to Casablanca (CVE-55) where more complete medical treatment was available. Arriving at San Diego, California, on 9 November, Tills underwent six days of availability before sailing for Panama on the 17th. Eight days later, on 25 November, she transited the Panama Canal for the first time. Departing Coco Solo on 27 November, the destroyer escort proceeded to Hampton Roads for further availability in the Norfolk Navy Yard and initial preparations for decommissioning. On 16 January 1946, Tills reported to the St. Johns River berthing area to commence initial preservation work for her eventual decommissioning in June 1946.

=== Cold War ===
Reactivated early in 1947 to an "in-service status", the ship was towed to Miami, Florida, where she was partially fitted out. In July, she made a two-week training cruise to San Juan, Puerto Rico, with naval reservists on board. The following month, she entered the Charleston Naval Shipyard in South Carolina for overhaul. Refurbished by November, Tills was homeported at Miami and operated along the east coast from Boston, Massachusetts, to Panama and in the Caribbean, primarily training reservists.

Tills was placed back in full commission at Charleston, South Carolina, on 21 November 1950, with Lt. Comdr. Elmo R. Zumwalt in command. The destroyer escort subsequently operated off the east coast as a training ship, undertaking refresher and reserve training cruises. Homeported at Charleston, the ship took part in Exercise "Convex III" from 27 February to 20 March 1952 and in Operation "Emigrant" from 6 to 12 October 1952. In between these tasks, she made her first cruise to European waters in the summer of 1952, calling at Lisbon, Portugal, and Arcachon, France, in June.

Continuing her reserve training cruises off the east coast through the summer of 1955, Tills cruised to Europe again and, after calling once more at Lisbon, added Cadiz, Spain, to her itinerary. In 1956, the destroyer escort undertook a total of 13 naval reserve cruises.

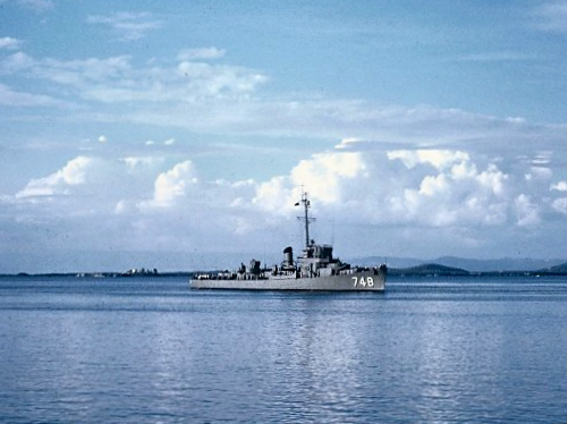
Tills in the early 1960s.

On 1 May 1958, Tills' home port was moved to Boston, Massachusetts, shifting the locus of her operations northward to the northeastern coast of the United States and to the Canadian provinces of Nova Scotia and Newfoundland. On 1 September 1959, after the ship had conducted reserve training and refresher training cruises for over a year, her home port was moved still farther north to Portland, Maine. On 18 October 1959, Tills was decommissioned and placed in service as a unit of the Selected Reserve Training Program. Administrative control was accordingly shifted from Commander, Destroyer Force, Atlantic Fleet, to Commandant, 1st Naval District.

After making weekend reserve cruises through the summer of 1961, Tills was recommissioned on 1 October 1961 in response to the Cuban missile crisis (blockade) with Lt. Comdr.W. L. Rich, USNR, in command. Following a six-week repair period at Newport, Rhode Island, and refresher training in Guantanamo Bay, Cuba, the ship operated out of her home port of Norfolk, Virginia.

After the crisis situation eased, Tills returned to her erstwhile home port of Portland, Maine, on 12 July 1962, and was decommissioned there on 1 August 1962. Attached to Reserve Destroyer Squadron 30 and Reserve Destroyer Escort Squadron, 1st Naval District, Tills operated out of Portland, Maine, in an in-service basis and resumed making weekend reserve training cruises. On these brief voyages, she conducted antisubmarine exercises and steamed up and down the St. Lawrence Seaway. Moving to Newport, Rhode Island, on 20 October 1963, the ship underwent a one-month tender availability during which she received new torpedo tubes which replaced her old ones and her K-guns. She returned to Portland on 17 November and remained there for the remainder of the year.

During 1964, Tills participated in a number of diverse and interesting events. After a tender availability alongside Grand Canyon (AD-28) from 22 March to 18 April, Tills returned to the Naval Reserve Training Center at South Portland, Maine, before getting underway for Boston on 13 June. A highlight of her reserve cruise was a four-day visit to the New York World's Fair.

After returning to her Maine base, the ship held an open house on 4 July and then visited Rockland, Maine, for the annual Rockland Seafood Festival on 3 August. On 28 August, Tills served as patrol ship for the annual Starboat Yacht Races off Winthrop, Massachusetts.

After subsequently participating in joint United States-Canadian antisubmarine exercises, the ship returned to the Naval Training Center at Portland for repairs before resuming her training cruises, a mission she faithfully carried out for the remainder of her career.

=== Decommissioning and fate ===
Found unfit for further service, Tills was struck from the Navy List on 23 September 1968. On 3 April 1969, the ship was sunk as a target off Virginia.

== Awards ==
Combat Action Ribbon (retroactive)
Navy Expeditionary Medal (Cuba)
American Campaign Medal
Asiatic-Pacific Campaign Medal (with two battle stars)
World War II Victory Medal
National Defense Service Medal (with one service star)
