= List of United States Navy ships: A–B =

Ships of the United States Navy

Ships in current service
- Current ships

Ships grouped alphabetically
- A–B; C; D–F; G–H; I–K; L; M; N–O; P; Q–R; S; T–V; W–Z

Ships grouped by type
- Aircraft carriers; Airships; Amphibious warfare ships; Auxiliaries; Battlecruisers; Battleships; Cruisers; Destroyers; Destroyer escorts; Destroyer leaders; Escort carriers; Frigates; Hospital ships; Littoral combat ships; Mine warfare vessels; Monitors; Oilers; Patrol vessels; Registered civilian vessels; Sailing frigates; Steam frigates; Steam gunboats; Ships of the line; Sloops of war; Submarines; Torpedo boats; Torpedo retrievers; Unclassified miscellaneous; Yard and district craft

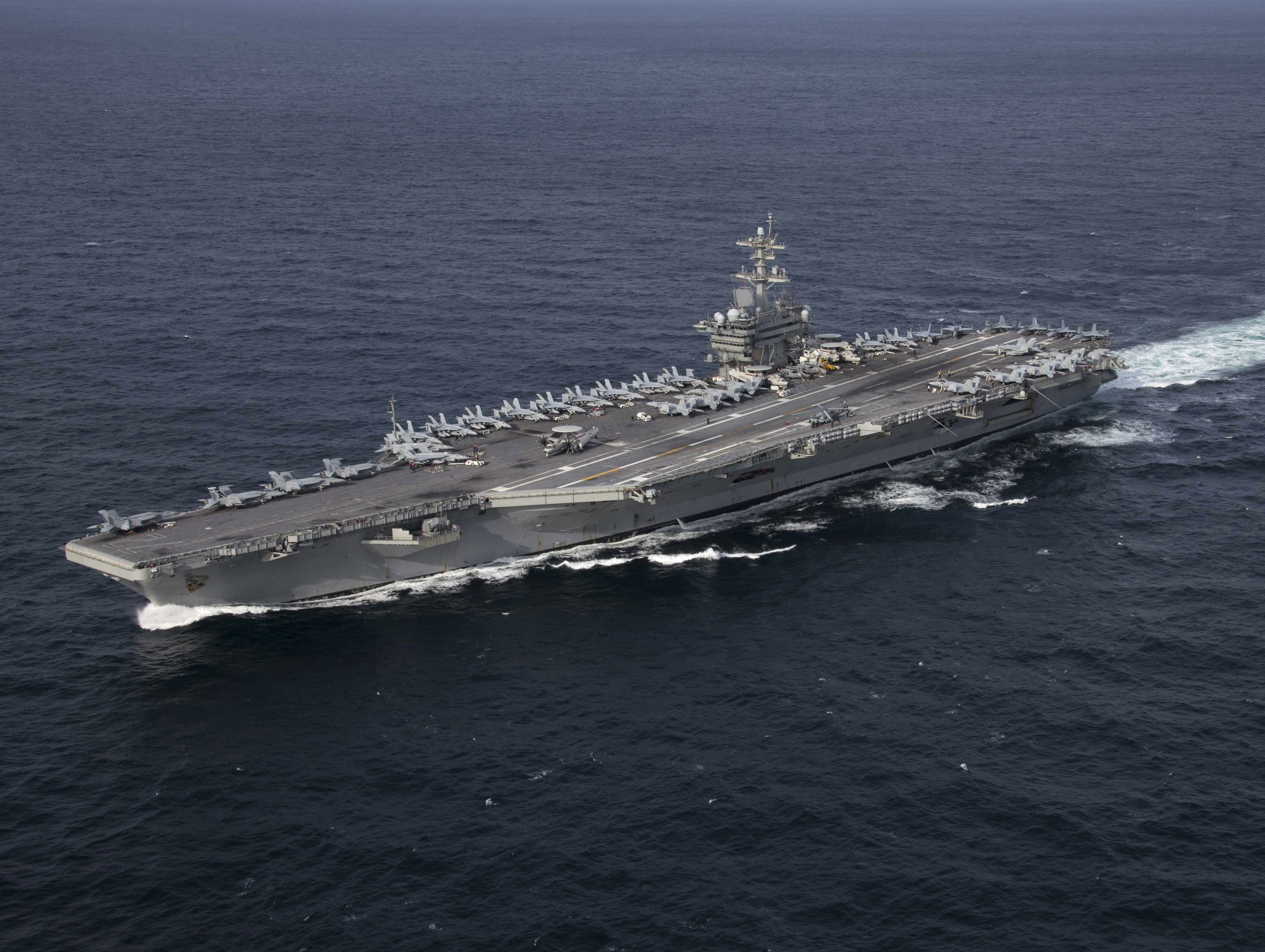
USS Abraham Lincoln (CVN-72)

This section of the list of United States Navy ships contains all ships of the United States Navy with names beginning with A and B.

For a list exclusively of currently commissioned ships, see the List of current ships of the United States Navy.

For ships with unique names, "USS Ship‍name" redirects to the ship article. For reused names, "USS Ship‍name" is an index page for the ships of that name; the links after the name lead to the specific ship pages.

== A ==
- USS A-1 (SS-2, SP-1370)
- USS A-2 (SS-3)
- USS A-3 (SS-4)
- USS A-4 (SS-5)
- USS A-5 (SS-6)
- USS A-6 (SS-7)
- USS A-7 (SS-8)
- USS AA-1 (SS-52/SF-1)
- USS AA-2 (SS-60/SF-2)
- USS AA-3 (SS-61/SF-3)
- USS A. C. Powell (1861)
- USS A. Childs (1865)
- USS A. Collier (1864)
- USS A. D. Vance (1862)
- USS A. DeGroat (1863)
- USS A. G. Prentiss (1912)
- USS A. Holly (1861)
- USS A. Houghton (1852)
- USS A. J. View (1861)
- USS A. O. Tyler (1857)
- MV A1C William H. Pitsenbarger (T-AK-4638)

=== Aa–Ac ===
- USS Aaron V. Brown (1861)
- USS Aaron Ward (DD-132, DD-483, DD-773/DM-34)
- USS Abadejo (SS-308)
- USS Abalone (SP-208)
- USS Abarenda (AC-13/AG-14, IX-131)
- USS Abatan (AO-92/AW-4)
- USS Abbot (DD-184, DD-629)
- USS Abel P. Upshur (DD-193)
- USS Abele (YN-77/AN-58)
- USS Abeona (1831)
- USS Abercrombie (DE-343)
- USS Aberdeen (1912)
- USS Abilene (PF-58)
- USS Ability (PYc-28, MSO-519, AFDL-7)
- USS Abinago (YTB-493/YTM-493)
- USS Abingdon (PC-1237)
- USNS Abiqua (T-AO-158)
- USNS Able (T-AGOS-20)
- USS Abnaki (AT-96/ATF-96)
- USS Abner Read (DD-526, DD-769)
- USS Abraham (1858)
- USS Abraham Lincoln (SSBN-602, CVN-72)
- USS Absaroka (1917)
- USS Absecon (1918, AVP-23/WAVP-374/WHEC-374)
- USS Absegami (SP-371)
- USS Acacia (1863)
- USS Acadia (AD-42)
- USS Accelerate (ARS-30)
- USS Accentor (AMc-36, AMCU-15)
- USS Accohanoc (YTB-545/YTM-545)
- USS Accokeek (ATA-181)
- USS Accomac (YT-18/YTL-18, APB-49, YTB-812)
- USS Acedia (SS-309)
- USS Achelous (ARL-1)
- USS Achernar (AKA-53)
- USS Achigan (YT-218/YTB-218)
- USS Achilles (ARL-41)
- USS Achomawi (AT-148/ATF-148)
- USS Acme (AMc-61, AM-508/MSO-508)
- USS Acoma (SP-1228, YTB-701/YTM-701)
- USS Acontius (AGP-12)
- USS Acoupa (SS-310)
- USS Acree (DE-167)
- USS Action (PG-86)
- USS Active (1779, 1837, 1888, 1917, YT-112/YTM-112)
- USS Actus (SP-516)
- USS Acubens (AKS-5)
- USS Acushnet (1908/AT-63/ATO-63, WAT-167/WAGO-167/WMEC-167)

=== Ad ===
- USS Adair (APA-91)
- USS Adak (YFB-28)
- USS Adamant (AMc-61, AMc-62)
- USS Adams (1799, 1874, DD-739/DM-27/MMD-27)
- USS Adario (YNT-25/YTM-743)
- USS Adder (SS-3)
- USS Addie and Carrie (ID-3226)
- USS Addie Douglass (1862)
- USS Addison County (LST-31)
- USRC Addison F. Andrews
- USS Adela (1862)
- USS Adelaide (1854)
- USS Adelante (SP-765)
- USS Adelheid (1903)
- USNS Adelphi (T-AG-181)
- USS Adept (AFDL-23)
- USS Adhara (AK-71)
- USS Adirondack (1861, YT-44, ID-1270, AGC-15)
- USS Adjutant (AM-351)
- USS Admirable (AMc-113/AM-136/MSF-136)
- USS Admiral (1863, SP-541, SP-967)
- USS Admiral C. F. Hughes (AP-124)
- USS Admiral D. W. Taylor (AP-128)
- USS Admiral E. W. Eberle (AP-123)
- USS Admiral F. B. Upham (AP-129)
- USS Admiral Glass (YFB-2)
- USS Admiral H. T. Mayo (AP-125)
- USS Admiral Hugh Rodman (AP-126)
- USS Admiral R. E. Coontz (AP-122)
- USS Admiral W. L. Capps (AP-121)
- GTS Admiral W. M. Callaghan (T-AKR-1001)
- USS Admiral W. S. Benson (AP-120)
- USS Admiral W. S. Sims (AP-127)
- USS Admiralty Islands (CVE-99)
- USS Admittance (1847)
- USS Adolph Hugel (1860)
- USS Adonis (ARL-4)
- USS Adopt (AMc-114/AM-137/MSF-137)
- USS Adria (AF-30)
- USS Adrian (ID-2362)
- USS Adriana (1798)
- USS Adroit (SP-248, AM-82, AM-509/MSO-509)
- USS Advance (1850, 1862, 1917, ID-3057/YT-28, AMc-62, AMc-63, MSO-510)
- USS Advantage (ATR-41, AK-9682)
- USS Advent (AM-83)
- SS Adventurer (AK-5005)
- USNS Adventurous (T-AGOS-13)
- USS Advocate (1861, AMc-115/AM-138/MSF-138)

=== Ae–Ak ===
- USS Aegir (AS-23)
- USS Aeolus (ID-3005, ARL-42, ARC-3/T-ARC-3)
- USS Aetna (1869)
- USS Affray (AMc-112, MSO-511)
- USS Agamemnon (ID-3004)
- USS Agamenticus (1863)
- USS Agassiz (1861)
- USS Agate (PYc-4)
- USS Agate Pass (YTT-12)
- USS Agawam (1863, SP-570, AOG-6, YTB-809)
- USS Agenor (ARL-3)
- USS Agent (AMc-116/AM-139/MSF-139)
- USS Agerholm (DD-826)
- USS Aggressive (AM-422/MSO-422)
- USS Aggressor (AMc-63, AMc-64)
- USS Agile (AMc-111/IX-203, AM-421/MSO-421)
- USS Agwidale (SP-4464)
- USS Ahdeek (SP-2589)
- USS Ahoskie (YTB-804)
- USS Ahrens (DE-575)
- USS Ai Filch (1863)
- SS Aide (AK-5006)
- USS Aide De Camp (IX-224)
- USNS Aiken Victory (T-AP-188)
- USS Ailanthus (YN-57/AN-38)
- USS Aileen (1896)
- USS Aimwell (BAT-7)
- USS Ainsworth (DE-1090/FF-1090)
- USS Ajax (1869, AC-14/AG-15, SP-738, AR-6)
- USS Akbar (SP-599)
- USS Akela (SP-1793)
- USS Akron (ZRS-4)
- USS Akutan (AE-13)

=== Al ===
- USS Ala (YT-139/YTB-139/YTM-139)
- USS Alabama (1819, 1849, 1850, BB-8, SP-1052, BB-60, SSBN-731)
- USS Alabaster (PYc-21)
- USS Alacrity (SP-206, PG-87, MSO-520/AG-520)
- USS Alamance (AKA-75)
- USS Alameda (ID-1432, SP-1040, AO-10, AP-68)
- USS Alameda County (LST-32/AVB-1)
- USS Alamingo (YT-227/YTB-227/YTM-227)
- USS Alamo (LSD-33)
- USS Alamogordo (ARDM-2)
- USS Alamosa (AK-156)
- USS Alamuchee (YT-228/YTB-228)
- USNS Alan Shepard (T-AKE-3)
- USS Alarka (YT-229/YTB-229)
- USS Alarm (1873, AMc-117/AM-140/MSF-140)
- USS Alaska (1868, ID-3035, CB-1, SSBN-732)
- USS Alaskan (ID-4542)
- USNS Alatna (T-AOG-81/T-AOT-81)
- USS Alava Bay (CVE-103)
- USS Alazon Bay (ACV-55, ACV-94/CVE-94)
- USS Albacore (SP-751, SS-218, AGSS-569)
- USS Albany (1846, 1869, PG-36/CL-23, CA-72, CA-123/CG-10, SSN-753)
- USS Albatross (1861, 1882, SP-1003, AM-71/IX-171, AM-391, AMS-1/EAMS-1/EMSC(O)-1, MSC-289)
- USS Albay (1886)
- USS Albemarle (1863, AV-5)
- USS Albert Brown (SP-1050)
- USS Albert David (DE-1050/FF-1050)
- USS Albert DeGroat (1863)
- USNS Albert J. Myer (T-ARC-6)
- USNS Albert M. Boe (T-AKV-6)
- USS Albert T. Harris (DE-447)
- USS Albert W. Grant (DD-649)
- USS Albireo (AK-90)
- USS Albuquerque (PG-115/PF-7, SSN-706)
- USS Alcalda (SP-630)
- USS Alcedo (SP-166)
- USS Alchemy (AMc-118/AM-141/MSF-141)
- USS Alchiba (AK-23/AKA-6, AK-261)
- USS Alcona (AK-157)
- USS Alcor (AG-34/AR-10/AD-34, AK-259)
- USS Alcyone (AK-24/AKA-7, AKL-37)
- USS Aldebaran (AF-10)
- USS Alden (DD-211)
- USS Alderamin (AK-116)
- USS Alecto (AGP-14)
- USS Alert (1803, 1861, AS-4, 1896, SP-511)
- USS Alex Diachenko (DE-690/APD-123)
- USCGC Alex Haley (WMEC-39)
- USS Alexander (1894)
- USS Alexander Brown (SP-2725/YT-31)
- USS Alexander Dallas (DD-199)
- USS Alexander H. Erickson (SP-2298)
- USS Alexander Hamilton (USRC, WPG-34, SSBN-617)
- USS Alexander J. Luke (DE-577/DER-577)
- USS Alexandria (1862, PG-126/PF-18, SSN-757)
- USS Alfred (1774)
- USS Alfred A. Cunningham (DD-752)
- USS Alfred A. Wolkyns (1863)
- USS Alfred Robb (1860)
- USS Alfred Wolf (DE-544)
- USS Alger (DE-101)
- USS Algol (AKA-54/LKA-54, T-AK-287/T-AKR-287)
- USS Algoma (1868)
- USS Algonquin (1863, 1898, 1918)
- USS Algorab (AK-25/AKA-8, AK-262)
- USS Algorma (AT-34/ATO-34, ATA-212)
- USS Alhena (AK-26/AKA-9, AKL-38)
- USS Alice (1864, 1898, SP-367)
- USS Alida (YT-102)
- USS Alikula Bay (ACV-57, CVE-95)
- USS Alkaid (AK-114)
- USS Alkes (AK-110)
- USS Allagash (AO-97)
- USS Allamakee (YT-410/YTB-410/YTM-410)
- USS Allaquippa (YT-174/YTB-174/YTM-174)
- USS Allegan (AK-225)
- USS Allegheny (1847, AT-19/ATO-19, ATA-179)
- USS Allen (1814, DD-66)
- USS Allen Collier (1864)
- USS Allen M. Sumner (DD-692)
- USS Allendale (APA-127)
- USS Allentown (PG-160/PF-52)
- USS Alliance (1778, 1877, AMc-64)
- USS Alligator (1809, 1813, 1820, 1862)
- USS Allioth (AK-109/IX-204/AVS-4)
- USS Alloway (ID-3139, YT-170/YTM-170)
- USS Allthorn (YN-94/AN-70)
- USS Almaack (AK-27/AKA-10, AKL-39)
- USS Almandite (PY-24)
- USS Almax II (SP-268)
- USS Almond (YN-58)
- USS Alnaba (YTB-494/YTM-494)
- USS Alnitah (AK-127)
- USS Aloe (YN-1/AN-6)
- USS Aloha (SP-317)
- USS Alonzo Child (1857)
- USS Alpaco (1918)
- USS Alpha (1864, SP-586)
- USS Alpine (APA-92)
- USS Alsea (AT-97/ATF-97)
- USS Alshain (AKA-55/T-AKA-55)
- USS Alstede (AF-48)
- USS Altair (AD-11, AK-257/AKS-32, T-AK-291/T-AKR-291)
- USS Altamaha (AVG-6/ACV-6/CVE-6, AVG-18/ACV-18/CVE-18/CVHE-18)
- USS Alton (IX-5)
- USS Althea (1862, 1863, SP-218)
- USS Alturas (PC-602)
- USS Altus (PC-568)
- USS Aludra (AK-72, AF-55)
- USS Alvarado (1895)
- USS Alvin (DSV-2)
- USS Alvin C. Cockrell (DE-366)

=== Am–An ===
- USS Amabala (ID-2185)
- USS Amador (AK-158)
- USS Amagansett (SP-693)
- USS Amanda (1858)
- USS Amanda Moore (1900)
- USS Amaranth (1892/WAGL-201)
- USS Amaranthus (1864)
- USS Amazon (1861)
- SS Ambassador (AK-5007)
- USS Amber (PYc-6)
- USS Amberjack (SS-219, SS-522)
- USS Ameer (AVG-55/ACV-55)
- USS Ameera (SP-453)
- USS Amelia (1812)
- USNS Amelia Earhart (T-AKE-6)
- USS America (1782, 1861, ID-3006, CVA-66/CV-66, LHA-6)
- USS American (1861, ID-2292)
- USNS American Condor (T-AKR-9673)
- USS American Cormorant (AK-2062)
- USNS American Explorer (T-AO-165/T-AOT-165)
- USNS American Falcon (T-AKR-9672)
- SS American Kestrel (AK-9651)
- USS American Legion (AP-35/APA-17)
- USNS American Mariner (T-AGM-12)
- MV American Merlin (AK-9302)
- SS American Osprey (T-AOT-5076)
- MV American Tern (T-AK-4729)
- USS Amerika (ID-3006)
- USS Amesbury (DE-66/APD-46)
- USS Amethyst (PYc-3)
- USS Amherst (PCE(R)-853)
- USS Amick (DE-168/FF-168)
- USS Amistead Rust (AGS-9)
- USS Ammen (DD-35, DD-527)
- USS Ammonoosuc (1864)
- USS Ammonusuc (AOG-23)
- USS Ampere (ADG-11)
- USS Amphion (1899, AR-13)
- USS Amphitrite (1864, BM-2, ARL-29)
- USS Amsterdam (CL-59, CL-101)
- USS Amycus (ARL-2)
- USS Anacapa (AG-49)
- USS Anacortes (PC-1569)
- USS Anacostia (1856, AO-94/T-AO-94)
- USS Anacot (YT-253/YTB-253)
- USS Anado (SP-455)
- USS Anamosa (YT-409/YTB-409/YTM-409)
- USS Anaqua (YN-59/AN-40)
- USS Anchor (ARS-13)
- USS Anchorage (LSD-36, LPD-23)
- USS Ancon (ID-1467, AP-66/AGC-4)
- USS Andalusia (PC-1173)
- USS Anderson (DD-411)
- USS Andradite (PYc-11)
- USS Andres (DE-45)
- USS Andrew Doria (1775, IX-132)
- USNS Andrew J. Higgins (T-AO-190)
- USS Andrew J. Newbury (YAG-54)
- USS Andrew Jackson (1832, SSBN-619)
- USS Andrews (PC-606)
- USS Andromeda (AK-64/AKA-15)
- USS Androscoggin (USRC, AOG-24, WPG-68/WHEC-68)
- USS Anemone (1864, 1908)
- USS Anemone IV (SP-1290)
- USS Angler (SS-240/SSK-240/AGSS-240/IXSS-240)
- USS Anguilla Bay (AVG-58/ACV-58, ACV-96/CVE-96)
- USS Aniwa (ID-3146)
- USS Ankachak (YTB-501/YTM-767)
- USS Anna (1863)
- USS Anna B. Smith (ID-1458)
- USS Annabelle (SP-1206)
- USS Annapolis (PG-10/IX-1, PG-123/PF-15, AGMR-1, SSN-760)
- USS Annawan (YN-50/YNT-18/YTM-739)
- USS Anne Arundel (AP-76)
- USS Annie (1863)
- USS Annie E. Gallup (SP-694)
- USS Anniston (C-9)
- USS Annoy (AM-84)
- USS Anoka (PC-571, YTB-810)
- USS Antaeus (AS-21/AG-67)
- USS Antares (AG-10/AKS-3, AK-258/AKS-33, T-AK-294/T-AKR-294)
- USS Antelope (1861, IX-109, PGM-86/PG-86)
- USS Anthedon (AS-24)
- USS Anthony (DD-172/DM-12, DD-266, DD-515)
- USS Anticline (YO-62)
- USS Antietam (1864, CV-36/CVA-36/CVS-36, CG-54)
- USS Antigo (PC-470, YTB-792)
- USS Antigone (ID-3007, AGP-16)
- USS Antigua (AF-17)
- USS Antilla (1904)
- USS Antioch (T-AG-180)
- USS Anton Dohrn (SP-1086)
- USS Antona (1863, IX-133)
- USS Antrim (AK-159, FFG-20)
- USS Anzio (CVE-57/CVHE-57, CG-68)

=== Ap–Ar ===
- USS Apache (1889, 1891, SP-729, AT-67/ATF-67, T-ATF-172)
- USS Apalachicola (YTB-767, T-EPF-13)
- USS Apex (AMc-119/AM-142/MSF-142)
- USS Aphrodite (SP-135)
- USS Apogon (SS-308)
- USS Apohola (YTB-502/YTM-768)
- USS Apollo (AS-25)
- USS Apopka (YTB-778)
- USS Appalachian (AGC-1)
- USS Appanoose (AK-226)
- USS Appling (APA-58)
- USS Aquamarine (PYc-7)
- USS Aquarius (AK-65/AKA-16, AK-263)
- USS Aquidneck (YFB-14)
- USS Aquila (AK-47, PHM-4)
- USS Ara (AK-136)
- USS Arabia (ID-3434)
- Arabian (1896)
- USS Arago (1861)
- USS Aramis (SP-418/PY-7)
- USS Aranca (YTB-530)
- USS Araner (IX-57, IX-226)
- USS Arapaho (AT-14/YT-121, AT-68/ATF-68)
- USS Arapahoe (1864)
- USS Arawak (YTB-702/YTM-702)
- USS Arawan II (SP-1)
- USS Arayat (1888, IX-134)
- USS Arbutus (1862)
- USS Arcade (AMc-120/AM-143/MSF-143)
- USS Arcadia (SP-856, ID-1605, AD-23)
- USS Arcady (SP-577)
- USS Arcata (1903, PC-601, YTB-768)
- USS Arch (AMc-121/AM-144/MSF-144)
- USS Archer (1840, BAVG-1)
- USS Archer-Fish (SS-311/AGSS-311)
- USS Archerfish (SSN-678)
- USS Arco (ARD-29, ARDM-5)
- USS Arctic (1855, 1873, 1913, AF-7, AOE-8/T-AOE-8)
- USS Arcturus (SP-182, SP-593, AK-12, AK-18/AKA-1, AF-52)
- USS Ardennes (1845)
- USS Ardent (SP-680, AM-340/MSF-340, MCM-12)
- USS Arenac (APA-128)
- USS Arequipa (AF-31)
- USS Arethusa (1864, AO-7, IX-135)
- USS Argentina (1857)
- USS Argo (1779, 1892)
- USS Argonaut (SF-7/SM-1/APS-1/SS-166, SS-475)
- USS Argonne (1918, AP-4/AS-10/AG-31)
- USS Argos (1869)
- USS Argosy (1863)
- USS Argus (1803, PY-14)
- USS Arided (AK-73)
- USS Ariel (1777, 1813, 1831, 1862, AF-22)
- USS Aries (1862, AK-51, PHM-5)
- USS Arikara (AT-98/ATF-98)
- USS Aristaeus (ARB-1)
- USS Arivaca (YT-259/YTB-259/YTM-259)
- USS Arizona (1858, 1869, BB-39, SSN-803)
- USS Arizonan (ID-4542A)
- USS Arkab (AK-130)
- USS Arkansas (1863, BM-7, BB-33, CGN-41, SSN-800)
- USS Arleigh Burke (DDG-51)
- USS Arletta (1860)
- USS Arlington (AP-174, APA-129, AGMR-2, LPD-24)
- USS Armada (AMc-122/AM-145/MSF-145)
- USS Armadillo (IX-111)
- USS Armeria (1890)
- USS Armistead Rust (AGS-9)
- USS Armstrong County (LST-57)
- USS Arneb (AKA-56/LKA-56)
- USS Arnillo (SS-312)
- USS Arnold J. Isbell (DD-869)
- USS Aroostook (1861, ID-1256/CM-3/AK-44, AOG-14)
- USS Arrowhead (AD-35, T-AGSE-4)
- USS Arrowsic (YFB-59)
- USS Arroyo (SP-197)
- USS Artemis (SP-593, ID-2187, AKA-21)
- USS Arthur (1855)
- USS Arthur L. Bristol (DE-281/APD-97)
- USS Arthur M. Huddell (YAG-55)
- USS Arthur Middleton (AP-55/APA-25)
- USS Arthur W. Radford (DD-968)
- USS Artigas (1911)
- USS Artisan (AFDB-1)
- USS Artmar III (SP-408)
- USS Arundel (1873)
- USS Arval (SP-1045)
- USS Arvilla (SP-752)
- USS Arvonian (1905)

=== As–Az ===
- USS Ascella (AK-137)
- USS Ascutney (1862)
- USS Ash (YN-2/AN-7)
- USS Asheboro (PC-882)
- USS Asher J. Hudson (SP-3104/YT-37)
- USS Asheville (PG-21, PG-101/PF-1, PGM-84/PG-84, SSN-758)
- USS Ashland (APM-1/LSD-1/AV-21, LSD-48)
- USS Ashley (IX-83)
- USS Ashtabula (AO-51)
- USS Ashuelot (1865)
- USS Askari (ARL-30)
- USS Asp (1812, 1813, YFB-1)
- USS Asphalt (IX-153)
- USS Aspinet (YF-176)
- USS Aspire (AMc-123/AM-146/MSF-146)
- USS Aspro (SS-309/AGSS-309, SSN-648)
- USS Asquith (YFB-42)
- USS Assail (AMc-124/AM-147/MSF-147)
- USS Assertive (AMc-65, T-AGOS-9)
- USS Assistance (ID-3273, ARS-10, BAR-17)
- USS Assurance (MSO-521/AG-521, T-AGOS-5)
- USS Aster (1864)
- USS Asterion (AK-100/AK-63/WAK-123, AF-63/T-AF-63)
- USS Astoria (1867, SP-2005/AK-8, CA-34, CL-90)
- USS Astrea (SP-560)
- USS Astrolabe Bay (AVG-60/ACV-60, AVG-97/ACV-97/CVE-97)
- USS Astute (AMc-125/AM-148/MSF-148)
- USS Atakapa (AT-149/ATF-149/T-ATF-149)
- USS Atalanta (1781)
- USS Atanus (YTB-503)
- USS Atascosa (AO-66)
- USS Atchison County (LST-60)
- USS Atglen (ID-1315)
- USS Athanasia (AF-41)
- USS Atheling (CVE-33)
- USS Athene (AKA-22)
- USS Atherton (DE-169)
- USS Atik (AK-101)
- USS Atka (AG-90/AGB-3)
- USS Atlanta (1861, 1884, CL-51, CL-104/IX-304, SSN-712, SSN-813)
- USS Atlantic (SP-1182, YFB-3268, SP-859)
- USS Atlantic Salvor (ARS-33)
- USS Atlantida (IX-108)
- USS Atlantis (SP-40, AGOR-25)
- USS Atlas (1869, SP-2171, ARL-7)
- USS Attala (APA-130)
- USS Attica (PCS-1383)
- USS Attu (CVE-102)
- USS Atule (SS-403/AGSS-403)
- USS Aubrey Fitch (FFG-34)
- USS Auburn (ID-3842, AGC-10)
- USS Aucilla (AO-56)
- USNS Audacious (T-AGOS-11)
- USS Audrain (APA-59)
- USS Audubon (APA-149)
- USS Audwin (SP-451)
- USS Augury (AMc-126/AM-149/MSF-149)
- USS Augusta (1799, 1853, SP-946, CL-31/CA-31, SSN-710, LCS-34)
- USS Augusta Dinsmore (1863)
- USS Augustus Holly (1861)
- USS Auk (AM-38, AM-57/MSF-57)
- USS Aulick (DD-258, DD-569)
- USS Ault (DD-698)
- USS Aurelia (AKA-23)
- USS Auriga (AK-98)
- USS Aurora (SP-345)
- USS Aurore II (SP-460)
- USS Ausable (SP-1631)
- USS Ausburn (DD-294)
- USS Ausburne (DD-294)
- USS Austin (1839, DE-15, LPD-4)
- SS Austral Rainbow (AK-1005)
- USS Autauga (AK-160)
- USS Avalon (1908, ID-2432, DSRV-2)
- USS Avenge (AMc-65, AMc-66, AM-423/MSO-423)
- USS Avenger (1863, SP-2646, MCM-1)
- USS Aventinus (ARVE-3)
- USS Avery Island (AG-76/AKS-24)
- USS Avis (SP-382)
- USS Avocet (AM-19/AVP-4, AMCU-16/MHC-16)
- USS Avoyel (AT-150/ATF-150/WAT-150/WMEC-150)
- USS Awa (SS-409)
- USS Awahou (YAG-24)
- USS Awatobi (YT-264/YTB-264)
- USS Ayanabi (YTB-504)
- USS Aylmer (DE-72)
- USS Aylwin (1813, DD-47, DD-355, DE-1081/FF-1081)
- USS Azalea (1864, 1891, 1915)
- USS Azimech (AK-124)
- USS Aztec (SP-590)
- USS Azurlite (PY-22)

== B ==
- USS B-1 (SS-10)
- USS B-2 (SS-11)
- USS B-3 (SS-12)
- USS B. F. Macomber (SP-980)
- USS B. H. B. Hubbard (SP-416)
- USS B. N. Creary (1864)

=== Ba ===
- USS Bab (SP-116)
- USS Babbitt (DD-128/AG-102)
- USS Babette II (SP-484)
- USS Bache (1871, DD-470/DDE-470)
- USS Badassah (1837)
- USS Badger (1889, DD-126, DE-1071/FF-1071)
- USS Badoeng Strait (CVE-116/AKV-16)
- MV Baffin Strait (T-AK-W9519)
- USS Baffins (AVG-35/ACV-35/CVE-35)
- USS Bagaduce (AT-21/ATO-21, ATA-194/T-ATA-194)
- USS Bagheera (SP-963)
- USS Bagley (TB-24, DD-185, DD-386, DE-1069/FF-1069)
- USS Baham (AK-122/AG-71)
- USS Bahamas (PF-75)
- USS Bailer (YO-54)
- USS Bailey (1856, TB-21, DD-269, DD-492)
- USS Bainbridge (1842, DD-1, DD-246, DLGN-25/CGN-25, DDG-96)
- USS Bairoko (CVE-115/AKV-15)
- USS Baker (DE-190)
- USS Balanga (YT-103)
- USS Balao (SS-285/AGSS-285)
- USNS Balboa (T-EMS-2)
- USS Balch (DD-50, DD-363)
- USS Balduck (DE-716/APD-132/LPR-132)
- USNS Bald Eagle (T-AF-50)
- USS Baldwin (DD-624)
- USS Bali (ID-2483)
- USS Ballard (1813, DD-267/AVD-10)
- USS Balm (YN-78)
- USS Baltimore (1777, 1798, 1861, C-3/CM-1, CA-68, SSN-704, SSN-812)
- USS Bamberg County (LST-209/T-LST-209)
- USS Banaag (YT-104)
- USS Banago (ID-3810)
- USS Bancroft (1892, DD-256, DD-598)
- USS Bandera (APA-131)
- USS Bang (SS-385)
- USS Bangor (PG-124/PF-16)
- USS Bangust (DE-739)
- USS Banner (APA-60, T-AKL-25/AKL-25/AGER-1, T-AK-5008)
- USS Banning (PCE-886/PCE(C)-886)
- USS Bannock (AT-81/ATF-81)
- USS Banshee (1862, IX-178)
- USS Baranof (YAG-11)
- USS Barataria (1862, AVP-33/WPG-381/WAVP-381/WHEC-381)
- USS Barb (SS-220, SSN-596, SSN-804)
- USS Barbados (PF-76)
- USS Barbara (SP-704)
- USS Barbarossa (ID-3012)
- USS Barbel (SS-316, SS-580)
- USS Barber (DE-161/APD-57/LPR-57)
- USS Barbero (SS-317/SSA-317/SSG-317)
- USS Barbet (AMc-38, AMS-41/MSC(O)-41)
- USS Barbey (DE-1088/FF-1088)
- USS Barbican (ACM-5)
- USS Barboncito (YTB-495/YTM-495)
- USS Barbour County (LST-1195)
- USS Barcelo (YT-105, IX-199)
- USS Baretta (YN-60/AN-41)
- USS Barite (IX-161)
- USS Barker (DD-213)
- USS Barnegat (ID-1232, AVP-10)
- USS Barnes (AVG-7/ACV-7/CVE-7, AVG-20/ACV-20/CVE-20/CVHE-20)
- USS Barnett (SP-1149/YT-29, AP-11/APA-5)
- USS Barney (TB-25, DD-149/AG-113, DD-956/DDG-6)
- USS Barnstable (APA-93)
- USS Barnstable County (LST-1197)
- USS Barnwell (APA-132/LPA-132)
- USS Baron (DE-166)
- USS Baron DeKalb (1861)
- USS Barr (DE-576/APD-39)
- USS Barracuda (SS-21, SP-845, SF-4/SS-163, SSK-1/SST-3/SS-550)
- USNS Barrett (T-AP-196)
- USS Barricade (ACM-3)
- USS Barrier (AMc-127/AM-150/MSF-150)
- USS Barrow (APA-61)
- USS Barry (DD-2, DD-248/APD-29, DD-933, DDG-52)
- USNS Bartlett (T-AGOR-13)
- USS Barton (DD-599, DD-722)
- USS Bashaw (SS-241/SSK-241/AGSS-241)
- USS Basilan (ARG-12/AG-68)
- USS Basilone (DD-824/DDE-824)
- USS Bass (SF-5/SS-164, SSK-2/SS-551)
- USS Bassett (DE-672/APD-73)
- USS Bastian (AVG-37/ACV-37/CVE-37)
- USS Bastion (ACM-6)
- USS Bastogne (CVE-124)
- USS Bat (1864)
- USS Bataan (CV-29/CVL-29/AVT-4, LHD-5)
- USS Bateleur (AMc-37)
- USS Bates (DE-68/APD-47)
- USS Batesburg (PC-903/PCE-903)
- USS Batfish (SS-310/AGSS-310, SSN-681)
- USS Bath (ID-1997/AK-4, PG-163/PF-55)
- USS Batjan (1913)
- USS Baton Rouge (SSN-689)
- USS Battler (ACV-6)
- USS Battle Point (YTT-10)
- USS Bauer (DE-1025)
- USS Bausell (DD-845)
- USS Bauxite (IX-154)
- USS Bavaria (ID-2179)
- USS Baxley (1918)
- USS Baxter (APA-94)
- USS Bay Spring (AT-60/YNG-19)
- USS Baya (SS-318/AGSS-318)
- USS Bayfield (AP-78/APA-33)
- USS Bayntun (DE-1)
- USS Bayocean (SP-2640)
- USS Bayonne (PG-129/PF-21)
- USS Bazely (1863, DE-2)

=== Be ===
- USS Beacon (PG-88, PGM-99/PG-99)
- USS Beagle (1822, IX-112)
- USS Beale (DD-40, DD-471/DDE-471)
- USS Bear (USRC/USCGC/AG-29)
- USS Bearss (DD-654)
- USS Beatty (DD-528, DD-640, DD-756, DD-873)
- USS Beaufort (1799, ID-3008/AK-6, PG-167/PF-59, PCS-1387, ATS-2)
- USS Beaumere II (SP-444)
- USS Beaumont (PG-60)
- USS Beauregard (1861)
- USS Beaver (ID-2302/AS-5/ARG-19)
- SS Beaver State (T-ACS-10/XTR-1)
- USS Beaverhead (AK-161)
- USS Bebas (DE-10)
- USS Beckham (APA-133)
- USS Becuna (SS-319/AGSS-319)
- USS Bedford Victory (AK-231)
- USS Beeville (PC-617)
- USS Begor (DE-711/APD-127/LPR-127)
- USS Bel Air (PC-1191)
- USS Belet (DE-599/APD-109)
- USS Belfast (PG-143/PF-35)
- USS Belknap (DD-251/AVD-8/APD-34, DLG-26/CG-26)
- USS Bell (DD-95, DD-587)
- USS Bella (ID-2211)
- USS Bellatrix (AK-20/AKA-3, AF-62, T-AK-288/T-AKR-288)
- USS Belle (1864)
- USS Belle Grove (APM-2/LSD-2)
- USS Belle Isle (AG-73/AKS-21)
- USS Belle Italia (1862)
- USS Belle of Boston (SP-3071)
- USS Belleau Wood (CV-24/CVL-24, LHA-3)
- USS Bellerophon (ARL-31) (ARL-31)
- USS Bellingham (ID-3552)
- USS Bellona (ARL-32)
- USS Belmont (1917, AG-167/AGTR-4)
- USS Beloit (LCS-29)
- USS Beltrami (AK-162)
- USS Beluga (SP-536)
- USS Belusan (1900s, IX-187)
- USS Ben Morgan (1826)
- USNS Benavidez (T-AKR-306)
- USS Benefit (1863)
- USS Benevolence (AH-13/T-AH-13)
- USS Benewah (APB-35/IX-311)
- USS Benfold (DDG-65)
- USS Benham (DD-49, DD-397, DD-796)
- USS Benicia (1868, PGM-96/PG-96)
- USS Benjamin Franklin (SSBN-640)
- USNS Benjamin Isherwood (T-AO-191)
- USS Benjamin Stoddert (DDG-22)
- USS Benner (DE-551, DD-807/DDR-807)
- USS Bennett (DD-473)
- USS Bennington (PG-4, CV-20/CVA-20/CVS-20)
- USS Bennion (DD-662)
- USS Benson (DD-421)
- USS Bentley (DE-74)
- USS Benton (1861)
- USS Benton County (LST-263)
- USS Benzie County (LST-266)
- USS Berberry (1864)
- USS Berceau (YFB-3)
- USS Bergall (SS-320, SSN-667)
- USS Bergen (APA-150)
- USS Bering Strait (AVP-34/WAVP-382/WHEC-382)
- USS Berkeley (DDG-15)
- USS Berkeley County (LST-279)
- USS Berkshire (SP-1578)
- USS Berkshire County (LST-288)
- USS Bermuda (1861)
- USS Bernadou (DD-153)
- USS Bernalillo County (LST-306)
- USS Bernard (ID-2174)
- USS Berrien (APA-62)
- USS Berry (BDE-3)
- USS Bertell W. King (ID-3194)
- USS Berwind (SP-1671)
- USS Berwyn (ID-3565)
- USS Beryl (PY-23)
- USS Besboro (AG-66)
- USS Besoeki (ID-2534)
- USNS Bessemer (T-AG-186)
- USS Bessie H. Dantzler (SP-3158)
- USS Bessie J. (SP-1919)
- USS Bessie Jones (SP-1476)
- USS Besugo (SS-321/AGSS-321)
- USS Beta (1863)
- USS Betelgeuse (AK-28/AKA-11, AK-260)
- USS Bethany (PC-620)
- USNS Bethesda (T-EMS-1)
- USS Betty Jane I (SP-3458)
- USS Betty M. II (SP-623)
- USS Beukelsdijk (ID-3135)
- USS Beverly W. Reid (DE-722/APD-119/LPR-119)
- USS Bexar (APA-237/LPA-237)

=== Bi–Bl ===
- USS Bibb (1845, 1853, WPG-31/WHEC-31)
- USS Biddle (TB-26, DD-151/AG-114, DD-955/DDG-5, DLG-34/CG-34)
- USS Bie & Schiott (YP-2871)
- USS Bienville (1861)
- USS Biesbosch (ID-2499)
- USS Big Black River (LSM(R)-401/LFR-401)
- USS Big Chief (IX-101)
- USS Big Horn (AO-45/WAO-124/IX-207, T-AO-198)
- USS Big Horn River (LSM(R)-402)
- USS Big Pebble (YHB-23)
- USS Bigelow (DD-942)
- USS Bignonia (1863)
- USS Billfish (SS-286/AGSS-286, SSN-676)
- USS Billings (LCS-15)
- USS Billingsley (DD-293)
- USS Billow (1890s, ID-1704)
- USNS Billy Frank Jr. (T-ATS-11)
- USS Biloxi (CL-80)
- USS Bingham (APA-225/LPA-225)
- USS Birch (YN-3)
- USS Birgit (AKA-24)
- USS Birmingham (CL-2, CL-62, SSN-695)
- USS Bisbee (PG-154/PF-46)
- USS Biscayne (AVP-11/AGC-18)
- USNS Bismarck (T-JHSV-9/T-EPF-9)
- USS Bismarck Sea (CVE-95)
- USS Bitterbush (YN-58/AN-39)
- USS Bittern (AM-36, AM-352, AMS-69/MSC-69, AMCU-43/MHC-43)
- USS Bivalve (ID-2472)
- USS Bivin (DE-536)
- USS Black (DD-666)
- USS Black Arrow (ID-1534)
- USS Black Douglas (IX-55/PYc-45)
- USS Black Fox (YT-177/YTB-177/YTM-177)
- USS Black Hawk (1848, ID-2140/AD-9, MHC-58)
- USNS Black Powder (T-AGSE-1)
- USS Black Warrior River (LSM(R)-404/LFR-404)
- USS Blackbird (AMCU-11/MHC-11)
- USS Blackfin (SS-322)
- USS Blackfish (SS-221)
- USS Blackford (AKS-16/APB-45)
- USS Blackstone River (LSM(R)-403)
- USS Bladen (APA-63)
- USS Blair (DE-147/DER-147)
- USS Blakeley (DD-150)
- USS Blakely (TB-27, DE-1072/FF-1072)
- USS Blanche (1878)
- USS Blanco County (LST-344)
- USS Bland (APA-134)
- USS Blandy (DD-943)
- USS Blanquillo (SS-323)
- USS Bledsoe County (LST-356)
- USS Blenny (SS-324/AGSS-324)
- USS Blessman (DE-69/APD-48)
- USS Block Island (AVG-8/ACV-8/CVE-8, AVG-21/ACV-21/CVE-21, CVE-106/LPH-1/AKV-38)
- USS Bloomer (1856)
- USS Blount (AK-163)
- USS Blower (SS-325)
- USS Blue (DD-387, DD-744)
- USS Blue Bird (SP-465)
- USS Blue Dolphin (IX-65)
- USS Blue Jacket (1854, T-AF-51)
- USS Blue Jay (AMc-23, AMCU-17)
- USS Blue Light (1863)
- USS Blue Ridge (1918, AGC-2, LCC-19)
- USS Blueback (SS-326, SS-581)
- USS Bluebird (AM-72/IX-172, AM-415, ASR-19, AMS-121/MSC-121)
- USS Bluefish (SS-222, SSN-675)
- USS Bluegill (SS-242/SSK-242/AGSS-242)
- USS Bluffton (PC-461)

=== Bo ===
- USS Boarfish (SS-327)
- USNS Bob Hope (T-AKR-300)
- USS Bobby (1915)
- USS Bobolink (AM-20/AT-131/ATO-131, AMS-2/MHC-44)
- USS Bobylu (SP-1513)
- USS Bocaccio (SS-328)
- USS Bocachee (YTB-505)
- USS Bogalusa (YTB-759)
- USS Boggs (DD-136/DMS-3/AG-19)
- USS Bogue (AVG-9/ACV-9/CVE-9/CVHE-9)
- USS Bohio (1856)
- USS Boise (CL-47, SSN-764)
- USS Bold (AMc-67, AM-424/MSO-424, T-AGOS-12)
- USS Bolinas (AVG-36/ACV-36/CVE-36)
- USS Bolivar (AP-79/APA-34)
- USS Bollinger (APA-234/LPA-234)
- USS Bolster (ARS-38)
- USS Bomazeen (YT-238/YTB-238)
- USS Bombard (AMc-128/AM-151/MSF-151)
- USS Bon Homme Richard (CV-10, CV-31/CVA-31)
- USS Bonaci (SS-329)
- USS Bond (AMc-129/AM-152/MSF-152)
- USS Bondia (AF-42/T-AF-42)
- USS Bonefish (SS-223, SS-582)
- USS Bonhomme Richard (1765, LHD-6)
- USS Bonita (SS-15, SP-540, SF-6/SS-165, SSK-3/SS-552)
- USS Bonito (1846)
- USS Boone (FFG-28)
- USS Boone County (LST-389)
- USS Bootes (AK-99)
- USS Booth (DE-170/FF-170)
- USS Bordelon (DD-881/DDR-881)
- USS Boreas (AF-8)
- USS Borer (1814)
- USS Borie (DD-215, DD-704)
- USS Borum (DE-790/APD-82)
- USS Bosque (APA-135)
- USS Boston (1776, 1777, 1799, 1825, 1884, CA-69/CAG-1, SSN-703)
- USS Boston Salvor (BARS-6)
- USS Bostwick (DE-103)
- USS Botetourt (APA-136)
- USS Bottineau (APA-235/LPA-235)
- USS Bougainville (CVE-100/CVU-100/AKV-35, LHA-8)
- USS Bouker No. 2 (SP-1275/YT-30)
- USS Boulder (LST-1190)
- USS Boulder Victory (AK-227)
- USS Bountiful (AH-9)
- USS Bourbon (1783)
- USS Bowditch (AG-30/AGS-4, T-AGS-21, T-AGS-62)
- USS Bowdoin (IX-50)
- USS Bowen (DE-1079/FF-1079/FFT-1079)
- USS Bowers (DE-637/APD-40)
- USS Bowfin (SS-287/AGSS-287/IXSS-287)
- USS Bowie (APA-137)
- USS Bowman County (LST-391)
- USS Boxer (1815, 1832, 1865, 1905, CV-21/CVA-21/CVS-21/LPH-4, LHD-4)
- USS Boxelder (YN-80/AN-74)
- USS Boxwood (YN-3/AN-8)
- USS Boy Scout (SP-53)
- USS Boyd (DD-544)
- USS Boyle (DD-600)

=== Br ===
- USS Bracken (APA-64)
- USS Brackett (DE-41)
- USS Bradford (DD-545)
- USS Bradley (DE-1041/FF-1041)
- USS Bradley County (LST-400)
- USS Braine (DD-630)
- USS Brambling (AMc-39, AMS-42/MSC(O)-42)
- USS Branch (DD-197, DD-310)
- USS Branch County (LST-482)
- USS Brandenburg (1901)
- USS Brandywine (1825)
- USS Brant (AM-24/AT-132/ARS-32, AMS-43/MSC(O)-43)
- USS Brattleboro (PCE(R)-852/E-PCE(R)-852)
- USS Brave (PYc-34/YP-425, IX-78)
- USS Braxton (APA-138)
- USS Bray (DE-709/APD-139)
- USS Braziliera (1856)
- USS Brazos (AO-4)
- USS Breaker (1862, 1901, ID-1707)
- USS Breakhorn (AM-353)
- USS Breakwater (SP-681)
- USS Bream (SS-243/SSK-243/AGSS-243)
- USS Breck (DD-283)
- USS Breckinridge (DD-148/AG-112)
- USS Breeman (DE-104)
- USS Breese (DD-122/DM-18)
- USS Bremerton (CA-130/CG-14, SSN-698)
- USS Brennan (DE-13)
- USS Breton (AVG-10/ACV-10/CVE-10, AVG-23/ACV-23/CVE-23/CVHE-23/CVU-23/T-CVU-23/T-AKV-42)
- USS Brevard (AK-164)
- USS Brewster County (LST-483)
- USS Brewton (DE-1086/FF-1086)
- USS Briarcliff (IX-3)
- USS Briareus (AR-12)
- USS Bridge (AF-1, AOE-10/T-AOE-10)
- USS Bridgeport (ID-3009/AR-2/AD-10, PG-166, CA-127)
- USS Bridget (DE-1024)
- USS Bright (DE-747)
- USS Brill (SS-330)
- USS Brilliant (1862, ID-1329)
- USS Brinkley Bass (DD-887)
- USS Briscoe (APA-65, DD-977)
- USS Brisk (PG-89)
- USS Brister (DE-327/DER-327)
- USS Bristol (DD-453, DD-857)
- USS Bristol County (LST-1198)
- USS Britannia (1862)
- USNS Brittin (T-AKR-305)
- USS Broad Arrow (ID-2503)
- USS Broadbill (SP-823, AM-58/MSF-58)
- USS Broadkill River (LSM(R)-405/LFR-405)
- USS Broadwater (APA-139)
- USS Brock (DE-234/APD-93)
- USS Brockenborough (1862)
- USS Bronstein (DE-189, DE-1037/FF-1037)
- USS Brontes (AGP-17)
- USS Bronx (APA-236/LPA-236)
- USS Brooke (DEG-1/FFG-1)
- USS Brookings (APA-140)
- USS Brooklyn (1858, ACR-3/CA-3, CL-40, SSN-816)
- USS Brooks (DD-232/APD-10)
- USS Broome (DD-210/AG-96)
- USS Brough (DE-148)
- USS Brown (SP-1050, DD-546)
- USS Brownson (DD-518, DD-868)
- USS Brownsville (PG-118/PF-10)
- USS Bruce (DD-329)
- USNS Bruce C. Heezen (T-AGS-64)
- USS Brule (APA-66, T-AKL-28/AKL-28)
- USS Brumby (DE-1044/FF-1044)
- USS Brunswick (WAL-509, PG-176/PF-68, ATS-3, T-JHSV-6/T-EPF-6)
- USS Brush (DD-745)
- USS Brutus (AC-15)
- USS Bryant (DD-665)
- USS Bryce Canyon (AD-36)

=== Bu–By ===
- USS Bucareli Bay (ACV-61, CVE-98)
- USS Buccaneer (1888)
- USS Buchanan (DD-131, DD-484, DDG-14)
- USS Buchanan County (LST-504)
- USS Buck (SP-1355, DD-420, DD-761)
- USS Buckeye (YN-8/AN-13)
- USS Buckingham (APA-141)
- USS Buckley (DE-51/DER-51)
- USS Buckthorn (1863, YN-9/AN-14)
- USS Bucyrus Victory (AK-234)
- USS Buena Ventura (ID-1335)
- USS Buena Vista (1864)
- USS Buffalo (1813, 1892/AD-8, CL-84, CL-99, CL-110, SSN-715)
- MV Buffalo Soldier (T-AK-9301)
- USS Bugara (SS-331/AGSS-331)
- USS Bulkeley (DDG-84)
- USS Bull (DE-52, DE-693/APD-78)
- USS Bull Dog (1813)
- USNS Bull Run (T-AO-156)
- USS Bullard (DD-660)
- USS Bullfinch (AM-66, AM-392)
- USS Bullhead (SS-332)
- USS Bulloch County (LST-509)
- USS Bullock (AK-165)
- USS Bullwheel (YO-46)
- USS Bulmer (DD-222/AG-86)
- USS Bulwark (AMc-66, AMc-68, AM-425/MSO-425)
- USS Bumper (SS-333)
- USS Bunch (DE-694/APD-79)
- USS Buncombe County (LST-510)
- USS Bunker Hill (1917, CV-17/CVA-17/CVS-17/AVT-9, CG-52)
- USS Bunting (AMc-7, AMS-3/MHC-45)
- USS Buoyant (AMc-130/AM-153)
- USS Burden R. Hastings (DE-19)
- USS Burdo (DE-717/APD-133)
- USS Burges (BDE-12, BDE-16)
- USS Burias (ARG-13/AG-69)
- USS Burke (DE-215/APD-65)
- USS Burleigh (APA-95)
- USS Burleson (APA-67/IX-67)
- USS Burlington (PG-159/PF-51, T-JHSV-10/T-EPF-10)
- USS Burnett County (LST-512)
- USS Burns (DD-171/DM-11, DD-588)
- USS Burrfish (SS-312/SSR-312)
- USS Burrows (1814, DD-29, DE-105)
- USS Burton Island (AG-88/AGB-1/WAGB-283)
- USS Bush (DD-166, DD-529)
- USS Bushnell (AS-2/AG-32, AS-15)
- USS Bussum (1917)
- USS Busy (BYT-1)
- USS Butler (DD-636/DMS-29)
- USS Butte (APA-68, AE-27/T-AE-27)
- USS Butternut (YN-4/AN-9/ANL-9/YAG-60)
- USS Buttress (ACM-4)
- SS Buyer (AK-2033)
