= USS Brave =

USS Brave has been the name of two ships in the United States Navy. Both ships served concurrently during World War II with YP-425 dropping the name Brave in 1942.

- USS Brave (YP-425), a coastal patrol craft.
- USS Brave (IX-78), an auxiliary ship used for training.
