= USS Antigone =

The following ships of the United States Navy have used the name USS Antigone;

- USS Antigone (ID-3007), a troopship during World War I acquired in 1917 and left naval service in 1919
- USS Antigone (AGP-16), a World War II Portunus-class motor torpedo boat tender, launched and commissioned in 1944, removed from service in 1947 and scrapped in 1948
