= USS Active (YT-112) =

Tugboat of the United States Navy

History

United States
- Builder: Union Iron Works San Francisco, California
- Acquired: 20 April 1925
- Out of service: 5 June 1946
- Stricken: 19 June 1946
- Fate: Unknown

General characteristics
- Type: Tug boat
- Displacement: 270 long tons (270 t)
- Length: 101 ft 4 in (30.89 m)
- Beam: 24 ft (7.3 m)
- Propulsion: Steam, single screw
- Speed: 10 kn (12 mph; 19 km/h)

USS Active (YT-112) was acquired by the US Navy from the United States Shipping Board on 20 April 1925 and placed in service at New York on 27 April 1925. The harbor tug spent her entire 21-year naval career serving the 3rd Naval District from her base in New York harbor. She was placed out of service on 5 June 1946, and her name was struck from the Navy list on 19 June 1946. Though her fate is not known for certain, her age and length of service would suggest that she was sold for scrap soon thereafter.
