= USS Adroit =

Three ships of the United States Navy have been named Adroit.

- The USS Adroit (SP-248).
- The USS Adroit (AM-82).
- The USS Adroit (MSO-509).
