= USS Bushnell =

Two ships of the United States Navy have been named Bushnell after David Bushnell.

- USS Bushnell (AS-2), a submarine tender, was launched 9 February 1915.
- USS Bushnell (AS-15), a submarine tender, was launched 14 September 1942.
