= USS Big Horn =

Two ships of the United States Navy have borne the name Big Horn, after the Bighorn River.

- USS Big Horn (AO-45), was a tanker acquired by the Navy in 1942, and converted into a Q-ship. She was struck in 1946.
- USNS Big Horn (T-AO-198), is a Henry J. Kaiser-class fleet replenishment oiler in service since 1992

== See also ==
- USS Big Horn River (LSMR 402)
