= USS Alarm =

Two ships of the US Navy have been named USS Alarm.

- USS Alarm (1873), a torpedo boat.
- USS Alarm (AM-140), an Admirable-class minesweeper. Transferred to the Soviet Union under lend-lease in 1943 as the T-113, scrapped on 14 March 1960
