= USS Advocate =

Two ships of the United States Navy have been named Advocate.

- USS Advocate (1861) was a small fishing sloop captured from the Confederates on 1 December 1861.
- USS Advocate (AM-138) was a minesweeper launched on 1 November 1942 and transferred to the Soviet Union under Lend-Lease
