= USS Allegheny =

Three ships of the United States Navy have been named Allegheny, after the Allegheny River.

- USS Allegheny (1847)
- USS Allegheny (AT-19)
- USS Allegheny (ATA-179)
