= USS Bab =

High-speed motorboat

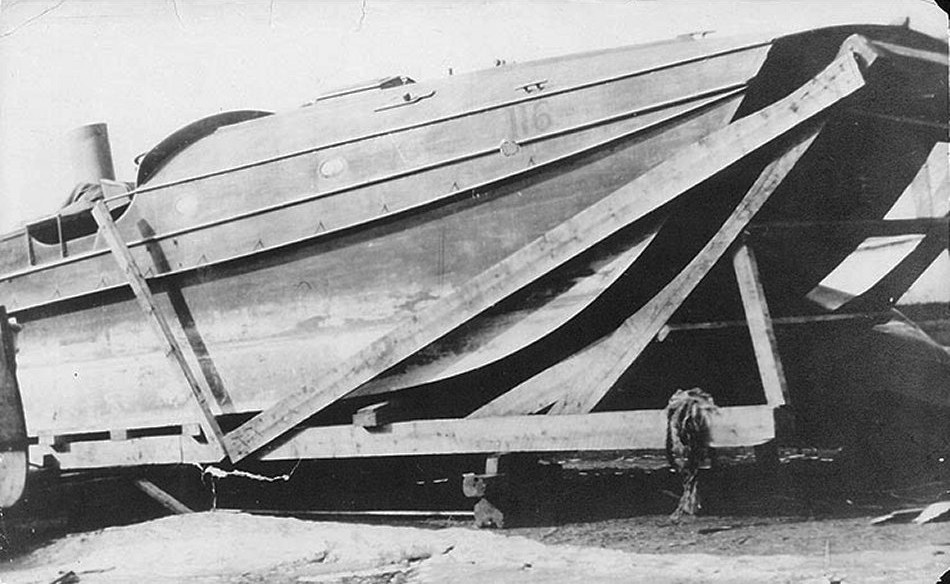
- USS Bab (SP-116) hauled out of the water during World War I.

History

United States
- Name: USS Bab
- Namesake: name given to the boat by her owner prior to her acquisition by the Navy
- Owner: Milton Wilson of Chicago, Illinois
- Laid down: date unknown
- Launched: date unknown
- Completed: in 1916 at South Boston, Massachusetts
- Acquired: leased by the Navy on 6 October 1917
- In service: October 1917
- Out of service: December 1918
- Stricken: circa December 1918
- Home port: Chicago, Illinois
- Fate: Returned to her owner for the sum of $1.00 on 31 December 1918

General characteristics
- Type: Motorboat
- Tonnage: 7 gross tons
- Length: 38 ft 0 in (11.58 m)
- Beam: 8 ft 1 in (2.46 m)
- Draft: 2 ft 4 in (0.71 m)
- Propulsion: Internal combustion engine
- Speed: 36 miles per hour
- Complement: not known
- Armament: Two machine guns

USS Bab (SP-116) was a high-speed motorboat leased for one dollar by the U.S. Navy during World War I. She was placed in service as a patrol craft and was assigned to the vicinity of Chicago, Illinois. Post-war she was returned to her owner for the sum of one dollar.

== Built in South Boston ==
Bab was a 38-foot section motorboat of the high-speed "sea sled" design built in 1917 at Boston, Massachusetts, by Murray and Tregurtha Company. She was leased by the Navy for $1.00 from Milton Wilson of Chicago, Illinois; and designated as a section patrol craft, SP-116; and delivered on 6 October 1917.

== World War I service ==
Assigned to the 9th Naval District, Bab patrolled the waters of Lake Michigan until the onset of winter caused her to be laid up.

== Post-war disposition ==
Eventually judged "not suitable for naval use", Bab was returned to her owner for the sum of $1.00 on 31 December 1918.
