= USS Active (1917) =

History

United States
- Name: USS Active
- Acquired: April 1917
- Stricken: 28 August 1919
- Fate: Unknown

General characteristics
- Type: motorboat
- Length: 36 ft 4 in (11.07 m)
- Beam: 8 ft 3 in (2.51 m)
- Draft: 2 ft 9 in (0.84 m)

USS Active — a motorboat built at Bay Shore, NY, for the Coast Guard—came under Navy control when the Coast Guard was transferred to Navy jurisdiction soon after the United States entered World War I in April 1917. She served the 9th Naval District at Chicago, IL, carrying out section patrol duties. An Executive order dated 28 August 1919 returned the Coast Guard to the jurisdiction of the US Treasury Department, and Active's name was struck from the Navy list that same day. Her subsequent fate is a mystery. By 1923, her name disappeared from the Coast Guard vessel register.
