= USS Azalea =

USS Azalea is a name used more than once by the U.S. Navy:

- USS Azalea (1864), a Civil War armed tugboat, commissioned in 1864.
- USS Azalea (1891), a lighthouse tender built at New York City in 1891.
- USS Azalea (1915), a wooden-hulled motor launch built in 1915 at Wilmington, California.
