= USS Billfish =

Two ships of the United States Navy have borne the name USS Billfish, after the billfish.

- USS Billfish (SS-286), was a Balao-class submarine, commissioned in 1943 and struck in 1968.
- USS Billfish (SSN-676), was a Sturgeon-class submarine, commissioned in 1971 and struck in 1999.
