= USS Benicia =

USS Benicia may refer to one of two ships in the United States Navy named for Benicia, California:

- USS Benicia (1868), a screw sloop launched in 1868 and decommissioned in 1875.
- USS Benicia (PG-96), a gunboat used as a test bed for guided missiles; transferred to South Korea and then scrapped in 1998.
