= USS Antigo =

USS Antigo may refer to the following ships operated by the United States Navy:

- USS PC-470 was a submarine chaser built for the United States Navy during World War II. She was later renamed Antigo (PC-470) but never saw active service under that name.
- Antigo (YTB-792) was a Natick-class tugboat serving the 6th Naval District from 1967 to 1999.
