= USS Abarenda =

Two ships of the United States Navy have borne the name Abarenda.

- USS Abarenda (AC-13), was a collier that served during World War I.
- USS Abarenda (IX-131), was a storage tanker that served during World War II.
