= USS Awatobi =

Tugboat of the United States Navy

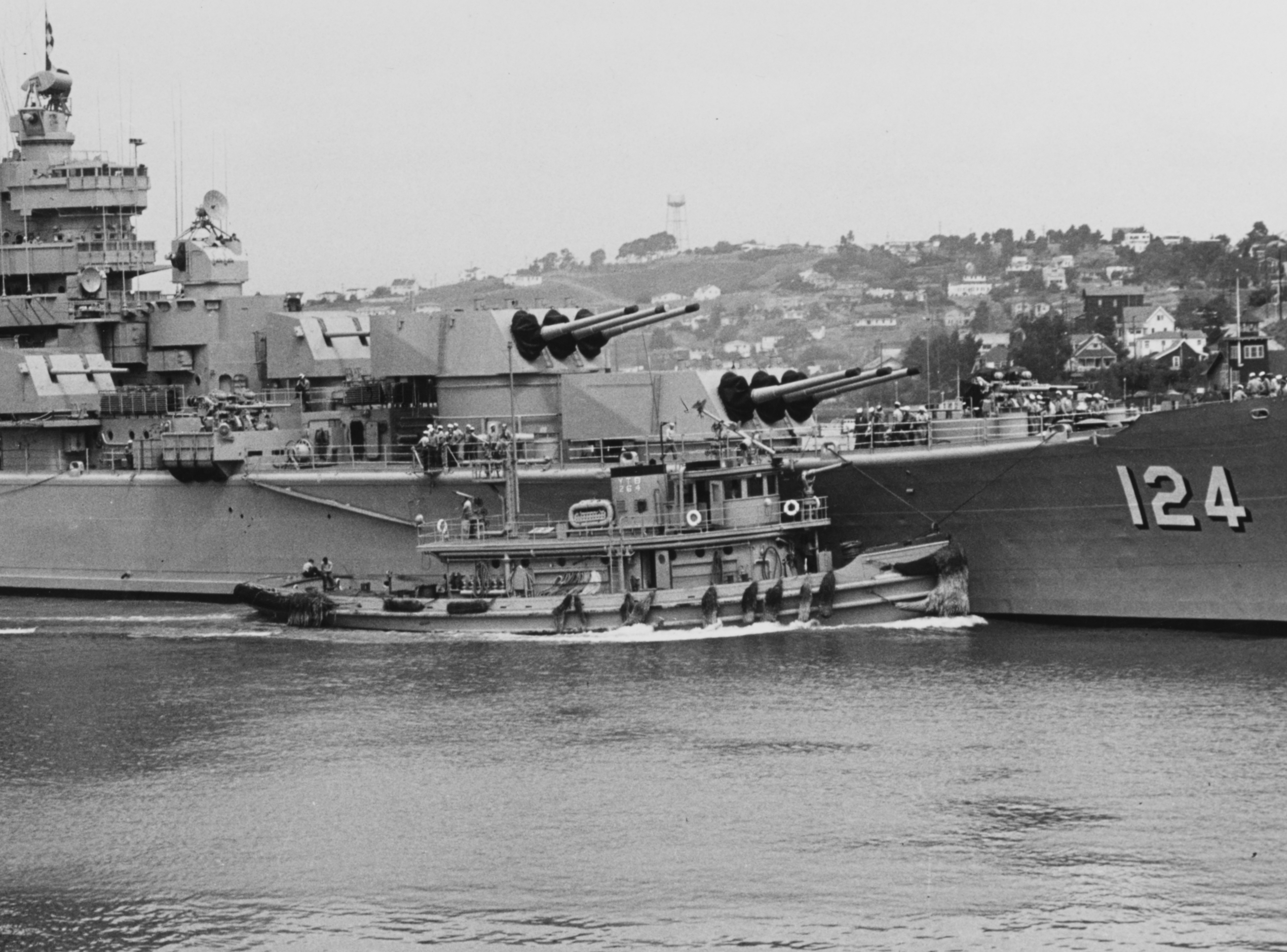
- Awatobi (center tugboat) alongside USS Rochester (CA-124) 20 September 1953, Mare Island Naval Shipyard, California

History

United States
- Name: USS Awatobi
- Namesake: A Hopi Indian word meaning "high place of the bow."
- Operator: United States Navy
- Ordered: as YT-264
- Builder: J.M. Martinac Shipbuilding Corp., Tacoma, Washington
- Laid down: 27 March 1944
- Launched: 30 September 1944
- Maiden voyage: Tacoma to San Francisco, California
- In service: 1 February 1945
- Out of service: 1960
- Reclassified: YTB-264, 15 May 1944
- Stricken: December 1960
- Homeport: San Francisco, California
- Fate: fate unknown

General characteristics
- Class & type: Cahto-class district harbor tug
- Displacement: 410 tons
- Length: 110 ft 0 in (33.53 m)
- Beam: 27 ft 0 in (8.23 m)
- Draft: 11 ft 4 in (3.45 m)
- Propulsion: diesel engine, single screw
- Speed: 12 knots (22 km/h)
- Crew: 12 enlisted men
- Armament: two .50-caliber machine guns

USS Awatobi (YTB-264) was a harbor tugboat acquired by the United States Navy during the close of World War II. She was outfitted with two .50-caliber machine guns and assigned to the San Francisco Bay area where she provided tug services, and other harbor services as required.

== Constructed at Tacoma, Washington ==
Awatobi (YT-264) was laid down on 27 March 1944 at Tacoma, Washington, by the J.M. Martinac Shipbuilding Corp.; reclassified a large harbor tug and redesignated YTB-264 on 15 May 1944; launched on 30 September 1944; and placed in service on 1 February 1945.

== World War II service ==
Awatobi served out her entire naval career as a harbor tug in the 12th Naval District in the San Francisco Bay area of California.

== Decommissioning and deactivation ==
She was deactivated in 1960, and her name was stricken from the Navy list in December 1960. The details of her disposition are not available.
