= USS Advance (1917) =

Patrol vessel of the United States Navy

History

United States
- Name: Advance
- Laid down: 1917
- Launched: 1917
- Acquired: 6 June 1917
- Commissioned: 6 June 1917

General characteristics
- Displacement: 11 long tons (11 t)
- Length: 50 ft 2 in (15.29 m)
- Beam: 11 ft (3.4 m)
- Draft: 5 ft (1.5 m) (mean)
- Speed: 8 kn (9.2 mph; 15 km/h)
- Complement: 4

USS Advance was an Advance-class patrol boat acquired by the United States Navy for the task of patrolling American coastal waters during World War I.

The third vessel to be named Advance by the Navy—a motorboat constructed for the U.S. Coast Guard in 1917 at North Tonawanda, New York, by the Richardson Boat Co. She was taken over by the Navy and commissioned on 6 June 1917.

== Service history ==
Advance was assigned to the 9th Naval District section patrol; and, although few documents recording her service have survived, she probably spent the entire period of America's involvement in World War I cruising the Great Lakes. The Coast Guard assumed custody of Advance on 28 August 1919; and, presumably, she continued duty on the Great Lakes. Coast Guard records reveal that by 1 January 1923, her permanent duty station and base of operations was Sault Ste. Marie, Michigan. On 6 November of that year, Advance was renamed AB-1. On 27 May 1924, the motorboat suffered a gasoline explosion, burned, and sank at Sault Ste. Marie. Raised and repaired, she returned to active service by 20 August. Four days later, she departed Sault Ste. Marie and proceeded to Chicago, Illinois. AB-1 spent the next 38 months based in Chicago and finally headed back to Sault Ste. Marie on 15 October 1927. She apparently passed the remainder of her Coast Guard career there. Her name disappeared from the Coast Guard register in 1940.
