= USS Boy Scout =

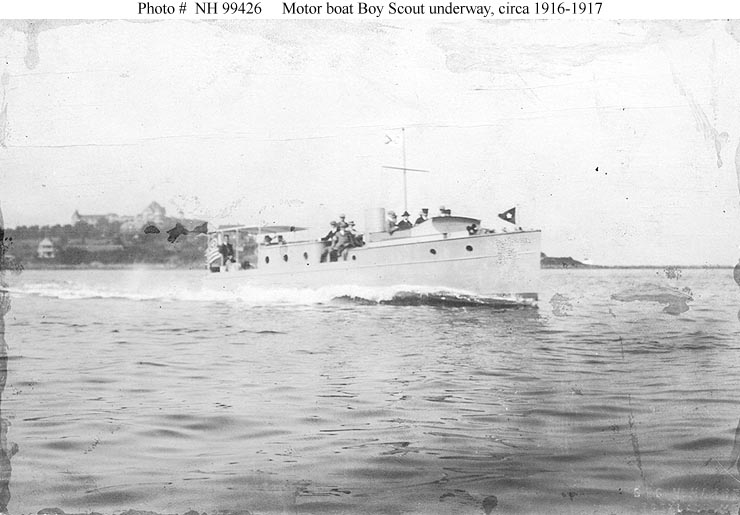
- Boy Scout underway, circa 1916–1917.

History

United States
- Laid down: 1916
- Acquired: 28 April 1917
- Stricken: c.1919
- Fate: not definitely accounted for

General characteristics
- Displacement: 9 tons
- Length: 45 ft (14 m)
- Beam: 9.25 ft (2.82 m)
- Draught: 10.167 ft (3.099 m)
- Propulsion: none
- Speed: 26 knots
- Complement: four officers and men
- Armament: one one-pounder cannon

USS Boy Scout (SP-53) was a wooden-hulled motorboat that served as a section patrol craft, was the only ship of the United States Navy to be named for the Boy Scouts of America and by extension for Scouting throughout the world.

== Background ==
Her keel was laid down in 1916 at Lynn, Massachusetts, by Britt Brothers. She was acquired by the United States Navy from Albert Geiger, Jr., of Brookline, Massachusetts, and classified as a section patrol (SP) craft. Initially assigned to First Naval District New England, Boy Scout was given the hull classification symbol SP-53 and was shipped overseas for "aviation service" perhaps, in view of her speed, for use as a crash boat at a naval air station. However, records of her operations and ultimate fate have not survived. The edition of Ship's Data, U.S. Naval Vessels of 1 July 1920 described Boy Scout as "overseas" but did not state where, only adding the curious notation that she was "not definitely accounted for, and in the absence of further reports will not be listed hereafter."
