= USS Arapaho =

USS Arapaho or USS Arapahoe may refer to:

- USS Arapahoe (1864), a sloop-of-war which was never constructed, canceled in 1866
- USS Arapaho (AT-14), a tugboat launched on 20 June 1914
- USS Arapaho (ATF-68), a tugboat laid down on 8 November 1941 at Charleston, South Carolina
