= USS Beale =

Two ships of the United States Navy have borne the name Beale, in honor of Edward Fitzgerald Beale.

- USS Beale (DD-40), was a Paulding-class destroyer, commissioned in 1912 and scrapped in 1934.
- USS Beale (DD-471), was a Fletcher-class destroyer, commissioned in 1942 and struck in 1968.
