= USS Buckthorn =

USS Buckthorn is a name used more than once by the U.S. Navy:

- USS Buckthorn (1863), a screw steamer, built in 1863 at East Haddam, Connecticut.
- USS Buckthorn (AN-14), a net laying ship laid down on 5 December 1940 at Alameda, California.
