= USS Admiral Glass =

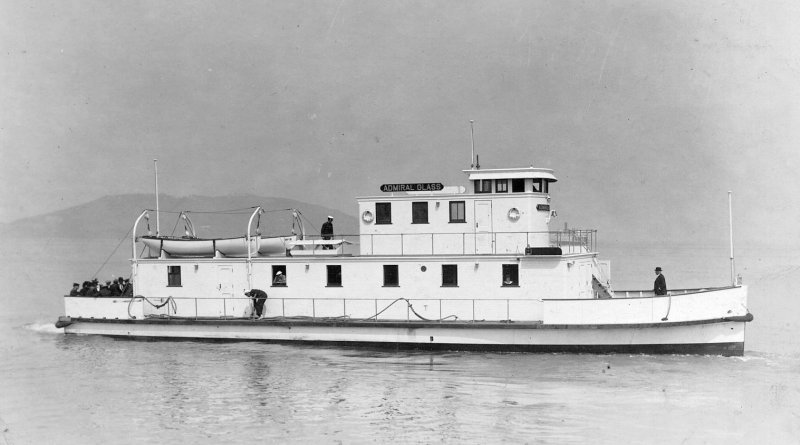
- Admiral Glass (YFB-2) underway in San Francisco Bay, date unknown.

History

United States
- Name: USS Admiral Glass (YFB-2)
- Namesake: Henry Glass Admiral USN
- Builder: Navy Yard Mare Island, Vallejo, CA.
- Launched: 26 July 1916
- In service: 22 August 1916
- Reclassified: Yard Ferryboat (YFB-2), 17 July 1920
- Stricken: 21 May 1926
- Fate: Sold, 27 May 1927, to Mr. George A. Moffitt of Oakland, CA.

General characteristics
- Displacement: 87 tons
- Length: 85 ft (26 m)
- Beam: 19 ft 6 in (5.94 m)
- Draft: 2 ft 7 in (0.79 m)
- Speed: 9 knots

Admiral Glass was a wooden-hulled ferryboat which was named for Admiral Henry Glass. It was constructed by the Mare Island Navy Yard (with which the late admiral had had much contact during the latter half of his career) and launched on 26 July 1916. Accepted and simultaneously placed in service on 22 August 1916, she spent almost a decade operating in the 12th Naval District. Records indicate that for a brief period in 1918 and 1919, Admiral Glass served at the Naval Training Station, Yerba Buena Island. On 17 July 1920, she was classified as a yard craft, YFB-2.

Pursuant to a material inspection of the craft, a report of which was dated 9 November 1925, Admiral Glass was placed "on the list of naval vessels to be disposed of by sale ..." on 21 May 1926, and her name was simultaneously struck from the Navy list. The launch was sold at public auction on 27 May 1927 to Mr. George A. Moffitt of Oakland, California.
