= USS Alpha =

Two ships of the United States Navy have been named Alpha, after the first letter in the Greek alphabet.

- USS Alpha (1864), a screw tug bearing a spar torpedo during the Civil War
- USS Alpha (SP-586), a motor yacht that patrolled off Massachusetts, Rhode Island, and Connecticut during World War I; built 1911; purchased by U.S. Navy in 1917; sold in 1919
