= USS Alida =

Tugboat of the United States Navy

History

United States
- Builder: Pusey & Jones Corp., Wilmington, DE
- Launched: 1905
- Acquired: 1912
- Reclassified: District Harbor Tug YT-102, 17 July 1920
- Fate: Sold, 19 March 1921

General characteristics
- Displacement: 142 t
- Length: 76 ft (23 m)
- Beam: 18 ft (5.5 m)
- Propulsion: steam, single screw

Alida—a tug built in 1905 at Wilmington, Del., by Pusey & Jones Corp.—was apparently acquired by the Navy sometime in 1912. She was placed in service at Melville Station, RI, and spent her entire career there providing support for the Naval Torpedo Station, Newport, RI She served the Navy through World War I and into the twenties. In the summer of 1920, when the Navy adopted its present alphanumeric system of hull designations, Alida became YT-102. She was sold on 19 March 1921.
