= USS Ashley =

Patrol vessel of the United States Navy

History

United States
- Name: USS Ashley
- Builder: T. Berlin Albury, Harbour Island, Bahamas
- Launched: 1937
- Acquired: 29 July 1942
- In service: 11 September 1942
- Renamed: Ashley (IX-83), 4 September 1942
- Stricken: 16 November 1943
- Fate: Unknown

General characteristics
- Type: Schooner
- Displacement: 41 long tons (42 t)
- Length: 65 ft (20 m)
- Beam: 17 ft 6 in (5.33 m)
- Draft: 4 ft (1.2 m)
- Speed: 7.5 knots (13.9 km/h; 8.6 mph)

USS Ashley (IX-83) was an auxiliary schooner of the United States Navy during World War II.

Built by T. Berlin Albury as Winslow during 1937 at Harbor Island in the Bahamas, the ship was acquired by the Navy from the Adavondach School, Inc., of Florida, on 29 July 1942; renamed Ashley on 4 September 1942 and designated IX-83 that same day; and placed in service on 11 September 1942 at the section base at Port Everglades, Florida.

== Service history ==
The purpose for which Ashley was acquired and placed in service remains unclear. It is possible that she was to have been used in either the Inshore Patrol or the Coastal Picket Patrol, but nothing definitive is known. She spent her entire, brief Navy career assigned to the 7th Naval District, probably operating from Port Everglades. On 24 March 1943, she was selected for lay up by the Commandant, 7th Naval District. The date of her being placed out of service has not been found, but her name was struck from the Navy List on 16 November 1943. On 22 January 1944, she was loaned to the Merritt-Chapman & Scott Corp. for operation in some unspecified service by a civilian crew. Her ultimate disposition also remains a mystery.
