= USS Alice =

USS Alice may refer to the following ships of the United States Navy:

- USS Alice (1864), was a screw tug purchased by the Navy on 25 July 1864 and renamed Aster before being placed in commission.
- USS Alice (1898), was a harbor tug. The vessel was at Norfolk Navy Yard in December 1905
- USS Alice (SP-367)
