= USS Breakwater =

Patrol vessel of the United States Navy

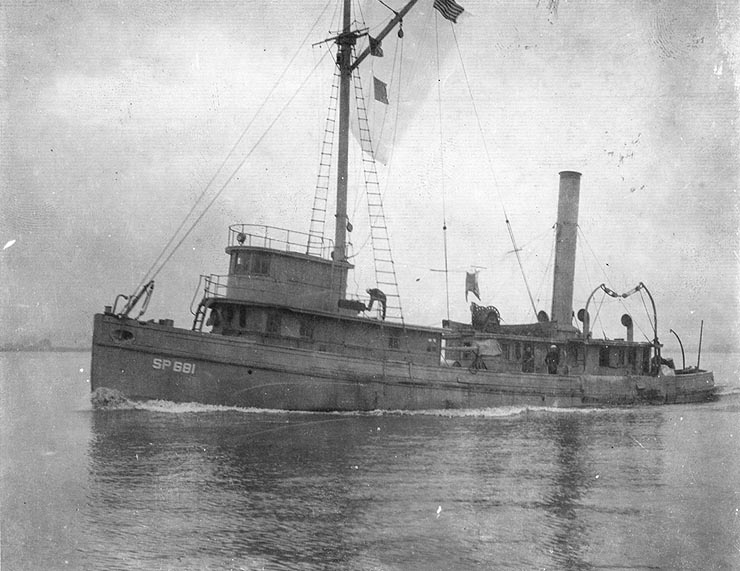
- USS Breakwater (SP-681) ca. 1918.

History

United States
- Name: USS Breakwater
- Namesake: Previous name retained
- Completed: 1907
- Acquired: Spring 1917
- Commissioned: 12 May 1917
- Decommissioned: 8 September 1920
- Fate: Sold 8 April 1921
- Notes: Operated as commercial fishing trawler Breakwater 1907-1917

General characteristics
- Type: Patrol vessel, minesweeper, and tug
- Tonnage: 95 or 140 gross register tons
- Length: 105 ft (32 m)
- Beam: 24 ft (7.3 m)
- Draft: 11 ft (3.4 m) mean
- Propulsion: Steam engine, one shaft
- Speed: 10 knots
- Complement: 25
- Armament: 2 × 3-pounder guns

USS Breakwater (SP-681) was a United States Navy patrol vessel, minesweeper, and tug in commission from 1917 to 1920.

Breakwater was built as a wooden-hulled, single-screw commercial steam fishing trawler of the same name at Milton, Delaware, in 1907. In the spring of 1917, the U.S. Navy purchased her from the Lewes Fishing Company of Lewes, Delaware, for use during World War I. Assigned the section patrol number 681, she was commissioned at the Philadelphia Navy Yard in Philadelphia, Pennsylvania, on 12 May 1917 as USS Breakwater (SP-681).

Assigned to the 4th Naval District, Breakwater operated as a patrol vessel, minesweeper, and tug for the remainder of World War I and into the summer of 1919.

On 15 July 1919, Breakwater was assigned to Submarine Division 1 at Coco Solo in the Panama Canal Zone. That day, she received orders to assemble at Cape May, New Jersey, with the patrol vessels USS F. Mansfield and Sons Co. (SP-691) and USS SP-467 at "the earliest practicable date and when ready proceed in company by Canal Zone to assigned stations." Breakwater reached her station in the Canal Zone and operated out of Coco Solo as a utility vessel with Submarine Division 1.

Drydocked in the spring of 1920, Breakwater was found to be in poor shape, and a board of inspection and survey condemned her. She was decommissioned at Coco Solo on 8 September 1920 and was sold to the Panama Construction Company on 8 April 1921.
