= USS Antigua =

USS Antigua may refer to more than one United States Navy ship:

- USS Antigua (AF-17), a Mizar-class combination refrigerated store ship and passenger liner acquired on 28 December 1941 from United Fruit Company modified to add guns but never commissioned formally in U.S. Navy service. Served in Pacific Theater during World War II with Merchant Marine and Navy Armed Guard crew. She was returned to United Fruit Company in 1946.
- USS Hamond (PF-73), also spelled Hammond, a patrol frigate renamed Antigua while under construction before her 1943–45 Royal Navy service as HMS Antigua (K501)
