= USS Barbet =

Barbet is a name used more than once by the U.S. Navy:

- USS Barbet (AMc-38), a coastal minesweeper commissioned on 29 September 1941.
- USS Barbet (AMS-41), a minesweeper commissioned on 8 June 1942.
