= USS Bergall =

Two submarines of the United States Navy have been named USS Bergall for the bergall, a small fish of the New England coast.

- USS Bergall (SS-320), was a Balao-class submarine that served during World War II, then was sold to Turkey.
- USS Bergall (SSN-667), was a Sturgeon-class submarine that served during the Cold War.
