= USS Anoka =

USS Anoka may refer to the following ships operated by the United States Navy:

- USS Anoka (PC-571), a PC-461-class submarine chaser laid down 1941 and struck in 1957
- Anoka (YTB-810), a Natick-class tugboat launched in 1970 and struck in 2001.
