= USS Algorma =

Two ships of the United States Navy have been named Algorma, a Native American word meaning to fish with a torch.

- USS Algorma (AT-34)
- USS Algorma (ATA-212)
