= USS Amberjack =

Two submarines of the United States Navy have borne the name Amberjack, for a pair of species of vigorous sport fish.

- USS Amberjack (SS-219), was a Gato-class submarine that was lost after a successful career during World War II.
- USS Amberjack (SS-522), was a Tench-class submarine that served through most of the Cold War and was later sold to Brazil.
