= USS Asterion =

USS Asterion has been the name of two ship of the United States Navy.

- USS Asterion (AK-100), was a cargo ship that served during both World Wars.
- USS Asterion (AF-63), was originally named Arcadia Victory and was acquired by the Navy in 1961 as a store ship.
