= USS Bath =

USS Bath has been the name of more than one United States Navy ship, and may refer to:

- USS Bath (AK-4), originally USS Bath (ID-1997), a cargo ship in commission from 1917 to 1922
- USS Bath (PF-55), a patrol frigate in commission from 1944 to 1945
