= USS Blue Jay =

USS Blue Jay may refer to one of the following United States Navy ships:

- USS Blue Jay (AMc-23), the former fishing vessel Charles J. Ashley; acquired by the Navy as a coastal minesweeper and renamed, 1940; converted to diving tender as YTD-6, 1943; reverted to original owner in 1946.
- USS Blue Jay (AMCU-17), the former LCI(L)-654; converted to Coastal Minesweeper (Underwater Locator), 1954; never commissioned under Blue Jay name; sold, 1960.
