= USS Arcata =

USS Arcata has been the name of more than one United States Navy ship, and may refer to:

- USS Arcata (1903) – a wooden-hulled Coast Guard cutter built 1903, remained in service into the early 1930s
- USS Arcata (PC-601) – a subchaser built in 1942 and struck in 1960
- Arcata (YTB-768) – a large district harbor tug, entered service in 1965 and sunk as target in 2004

== See also ==
- USAT Arcata — merchant ship built 1919; converted for US Army service in 1941; sunk in 1942 south of the Aleutian Islands by Japanese submarine.
