= USS Bunting =

USS Bunting may refer to the following ships of the United States Navy:

- USS Bunting (AMc-7) a wooden-hulled purse seiner built in 1935 at Tacoma, Washington.
- USS Bunting (YMS-170) which was laid down on 1 October 1942 at Benton Harbor, Michigan.
