= USS Brambling =

USS Brambling is a name used more than once by the U.S. Navy:

- USS Brambling (AMc-39), a coastal minesweeper commissioned on 15 October 1941.
- USS Brambling (YMS-109), commissioned on 23 September 1942.
