= USS Alcalda =

Patrol vessel of the United States Navy

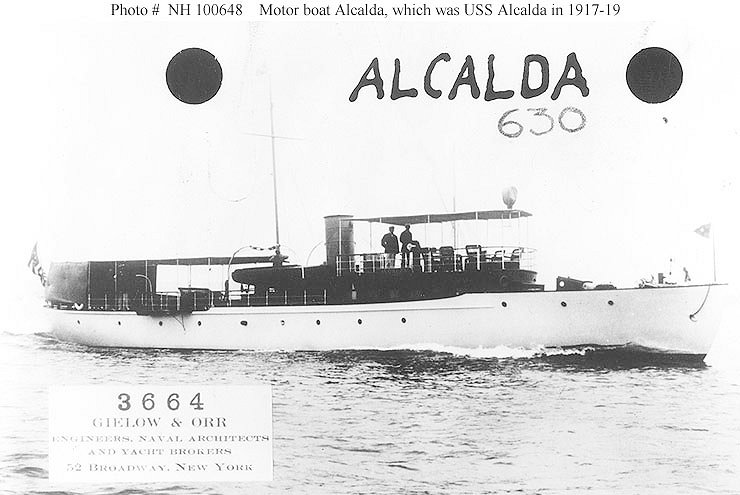
- Photographed prior to World War I. The original photograph bears the mark of the New York yacht brokers Gielow & Orr.Underway during World War I.

History
- Name: USS Alcalda (SP-630)
- Namesake: a variant spelling of alcalde
- Builder: I. M. Bayles and Sons, Port Jefferson, Long Island, NY
- Launched: 1910
- Acquired: 12 May 1917
- Commissioned: 11 May 1917
- Stricken: 11 January 1919
- Fate: returned to her owner

General characteristics
- Displacement: 77 t
- Length: 105 ft (32 m)
- Beam: 15 ft 5 in (4.70 m)
- Draft: 6 ft (1.8 m)
- Speed: 13.9 knots (25.7 km/h)
- Complement: 16
- Armament: one 3-pounder; one 1-pounder; two machine guns; one Y-gun

USS Alcalda (SP-630)—a yacht built in 1910 in New York at Port Jefferson on Long Island by I. M. Bayles & Sons—was acquired by the Navy on free lease from Mr. Farley Hopkins on 12 May 1917 though she was officially commissioned on the day before the transaction was completed. The vessel patrolled the waters of the 2nd Naval District to prevent incursions by German U-boats and to locate any mines laid by either U-boats or surface raiders. Alcalda was returned to her owner on 11 January 1919, and her name was stricken from the Navy list on that same day.
