= USS Assertive =

USS Assertive is a name used more than once by the U.S. Navy:

- USS Assertive (AMc-65), a coastal minesweeper laid down on 5 April 1941.
- USNS Assertive (T-AGOS-9), launched on 20 June 1986, built for MSTS.
