= USS Bobolink =

Two ships of the United States Navy have been named Bobolink, after the American bird, the bobolink.

- USS Bobolink (AM-20), was commissioned in 1919 and decommissioned in 1946.
- USS Bobolink (AMS-2), was originally YMS-164 and renamed Bobolink in 1947. She was struck in 1960.
