= USS Auk =

USS Auk may refer to:

- USS Auk (AM-38), laid down on 20 June 1918 at New York City.
- USS Auk (AM-57), laid down on 15 April 1941 at Portsmouth, Virginia.
