= USS Alamuchee =

Tugboat of the United States Navy

- USS Alamuchee (YTB-228) moored pierside at Naval Station New Orleans, date unknown.US Navy photo.

History

United States
- Name: USS Alamuchee (YTB-228)
- Namesake: Tributary creek to the Sucarnoochee River in Alabama
- Builder: Mathis Yacht Building Co., Camden, NJ
- Laid down: 3 July 1944
- Launched: 12 February 1945
- In service: 4 May 1945
- Stricken: April 1960
- Fate: Sold to the state of Louisiana

General characteristics
- Class & type: Cahto-class district harbor tug
- Displacement: 410 t (400 long tons)
- Length: 110 ft (34 m)
- Beam: 27 ft (8.2 m)
- Draft: 11 ft 4 in (3.45 m)
- Propulsion: diesel, single screw
- Speed: 12 knots (22 km/h)
- Complement: 12
- Armament: two .50-cal machine guns

USS Alamuchee (YTB-228) was laid down on 3 July 1944 at Camden, New Jersey, by the Mathis Yacht Building Company; launched on 12 February 1945; and placed in service on 4 May 1945.

The large harbor tug was assigned to the 8th Naval District and spent the next 15 years operating in New Orleans, LA. Her name was struck from the Navy list in April 1960, and she was transferred to the state of Louisiana in August of that year. She was operated by the Board of Commissioners of the Port of New Orleans as a firefighting tug until 1965. The Louisiana government sold the tug at public auction to Mr. George W. Whiteman on 9 August 1965.
