= USNS Alatna =

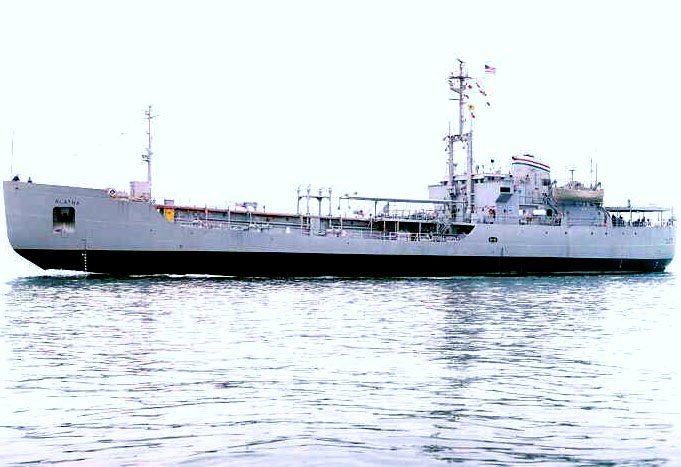
- Alatna (T-AOT-81) underway.

History

United States
- Name: Alatna
- Builder: Bethlehem Steel, Baltimore, Maryland
- Laid down: 15 March 1956
- Launched: 6 September 1956
- Sponsored by: Mrs. Wilma Miles
- Acquired: 17 July 1957
- In service: July 1957
- Out of service: 8 August 1972
- Identification: IMO number: 7606516
- Fate: Disposed of by MARAD sale, 16 December 2006, to Teroaka Company of Japan

General characteristics
- Type: T1-M2-4A arctic tanker hull
- Displacement: 2,367 t.(lt) 5,720 t.(fl)
- Length: 302 ft (92 m)
- Beam: 61 ft (19 m)
- Draft: 23 ft (7.0 m)
- Propulsion: Diesel electric, two shafts, 3,200hp
- Speed: 13 knots (24 km/h)
- Capacity: 30,000-bbls
- Complement: 51

USNS Alatna, was a gasoline T1 tanker specially constructed for service in polar regions, was launched on 6 September 1956 at Staten Island, New York, by the Bethlehem Steel Corporation, sponsored by Mrs. Wilma Miles, and placed in service with the Military Sea Transportation Service in July 1957.

Crewed by the civil service, Alatna carried petroleum products from ports along the Atlantic and gulf coasts and in the Caribbean Sea to scattered American outposts in both polar regions. For more than 15 years, the tanker and her crew struggled against snow, wind, and ice to support American military bases in the Arctic and American scientists in the Antarctic. On 8 August 1972, Alatna was placed out of service and laid up with the Maritime Administration's National Defense Reserve Fleet at Suisun Bay, California.

The Alatna Valley in the Antarctic was named after this ship.
