= USS Aludra =

Two ships of the United States Navy have been named Aludra, after a star in the constellation Canis Major.

- USS Aludra (AK-72), a Crater-class cargo ship active from 1942 until it was torpedoed in 1943.
- USS Aludra (AF-55), a Alstede-class stores ship active from 1952 to 1969.
