= USS Bauxite =

History

United States
- Name: USS Bauxite
- Builder: Barrett and Hilp, Belair Shipyard, San Francisco, California
- Laid down: 9 July 1943
- Launched: 11 October 1943
- In service: 22 June 1944
- Out of service: May 1947
- Stricken: 23 June 1947
- Fate: Sold, May 1947

General characteristics
- Class & type: Trefoil-class cargo barge
- Displacement: 10,960 long tons (11,136 t) full
- Length: 366 ft 4 in (111.66 m)
- Beam: 54 ft 0 in (16.46 m)
- Draft: 33 ft (10 m)
- Propulsion: None
- Speed: Not self-propelled
- Complement: 58 officers and men
- Armament: 1 × 40 mm AA gun; 4 × 20 mm AA guns; 2 × .30 cal. machine guns

USS Bauxite (IX-154), a Trefoil-class concrete barge designated an unclassified miscellaneous vessel, was the only ship of the United States Navy to be named for bauxite, a mineral compound of several hydrous aluminum oxides. Her keel was laid down under a Maritime Commission contract (T. B7 D1, MC hull 1326) on 9 July 1943 at San Francisco, California, by Barrett and Hilp, Belair Shipyard. She was launched on 11 October as "Onyx" sponsored by Mrs. E. J. Rapley. Accepted by the Navy on 22 June 1944 as "Bauxite", and placed in service the same day under command of Lt. Aubie R. Robinson USNR.

== Service history ==
Assigned to the Service Force, Pacific Fleet, as a floating storage facility for general naval stores and provisions, Bauxite served at advanced naval bases in the Pacific theater, issuing supplies to ships as needed. The concrete barge was one of 13 controlled by Service Squadron 10. She carried over 7,000 different items and served an average of 600 ships a month. With a diesel electric power plant, she was able to generate her own power for refrigeration, cooking, lighting, ventilation, and distilling water. The barges provided much needed storage space afloat and released a number of self-propelled cargo ships to carry supplies to the forward areas.

Following the war, Bauxite was towed to Shanghai, China, where she continued to serve as a stores barge until authorized for disposal. She was sold at Shanghai to a Chinese purchaser in May 1947, probably Asia Development Corporation, and her name was struck from the Naval Vessel Register on 23 June 1947. Future fate unknown.
