= USS Ancon =

Two ships of the United States Navy have been named Ancon.

- USS Ancon (ID-1467), a Panama Railroad Company ship serving in the US Navy from 28 March—25 July 1919.
- USS Ancon (AGC-4), a Panama Railroad Company ship, acquired and converted by the US Navy during World War II.
