= USS Anacostia =

USS Anacostia is a name used more than once by the U.S. Navy, after the Anacostia River:

- USS Anacostia (1856), was a tugboat and patrol boat during the Civil War.
- USS Anacostia (AO-94), was an Escambia-class oiler commissioned on 25 February 1945 and decommissioned on 16 April 1946.
