= USS Bobylu =

Patrol vessel of the United States Navy

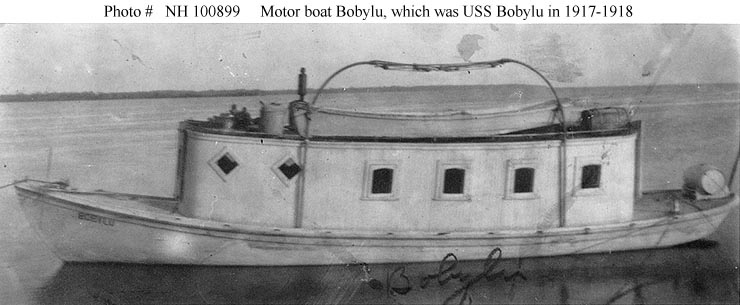
- Bobylu as a civilian motorboat sometime between 1915 and 1917

History

United States
- Name: USS Bobylu
- Namesake: Previous name retained
- Builder: Bob Willis, Davis, North Carolina
- Completed: 1915
- Acquired: 22 October 1917
- Commissioned: 22 October 1917
- Decommissioned: 31 December 1918
- Fate: Returned to owners 31 December 1918 or 8 January 1919
- Notes: Operated as civilian motorboat Bobylu 1915–1917 and from 1919

General characteristics
- Type: Patrol vessel
- Displacement: 6 tons
- Length: 35 ft 10 in (10.92 m)
- Beam: 10 ft 8 in (3.25 m)
- Draft: 2 ft 2 in (0.66 m) (aft)
- Speed: See note
- Complement: 4

USS Bobylu (SP-1513) was a motorboat that served in the United States Navy as a patrol vessel from 1917 to 1918.

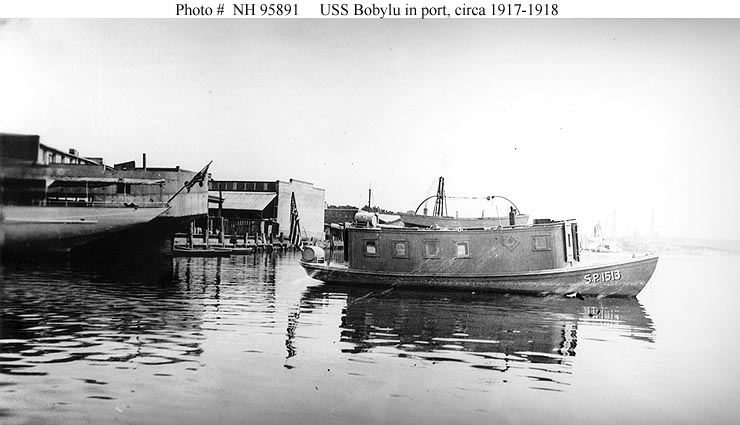
USS Bobylu during World War I.

Bobylu was built as a civilian motorboat in 1915 by Bob Willis in Davis, North Carolina. On 15 October 1917, the 5th Naval District inspected her for U.S. Navy use as a patrol boat during World War I, and the Navy ordered her to be acquired the same day. Her owners, the North Carolina Fisheries Commission, delivered her to the Navy at Norfolk, Virginia, on 22 October 1917 for use under a free lease, and she was commissioned the same day as USS Bobylu (SP-1513).

Bobylu was assigned to "general service" during the war, and operated in the 5th Naval District.

On 26 September 1918, the Navy ordered Bobylu returned to the Fisheries Commission. She was decommissioned on 31 December 1918 and returned to the Commission either that day or on 8 January 1919.
