= USS Baltimore (1777) =

History

United States
- Name: Baltimore
- Namesake: Baltimore, Maryland
- Commissioned: 1777
- Fate: Lost 29 January 1780

General characteristics
- Type: Brigantine
- Propulsion: Sails
- Armament: 12 guns

USS Baltimore was a 12-gun brigantine of the Continental Navy in active service from 1777 to 1780.

Baltimore was built in Baltimore, Maryland, in 1777. She was fitted out by the orders of the Marine Committee of the Continental Congress as a packet or despatch vessel and commissioned in the Continental Navy under the command of Captain Thomas Read.

Few details of Baltimore's service are available. In addition to performing despatch service, she is said to have participated in the defense of the Chesapeake Bay and Delaware Bay in 1778 and 1779.

Baltimore was reported lost off Cape Henry, Virginia, on 29 January 1780.
