= USS Achigan =

Tugboat of the United States Navy

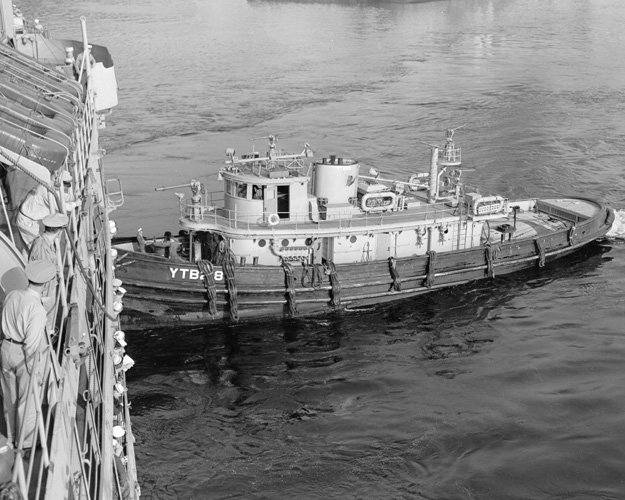
- USS Achigan (YTB-218) alongside an unidentified ship, date and location unknown. US Navy photo for the US Navy Memorial collection.

History

United States
- Name: Achigan
- Namesake: Algonquian Ashigan (Smallmouth bass)
- Builder: W. A. Robinson, Ipswich, Massachusetts
- Laid down: 23 July 1944
- Launched: 4 October 1944
- In service: 9 January 1945
- Out of service: 1957
- Reclassified: YTB-218, 15 May 1944
- Identification: Hull symbol: YT-215; Hull symbol: YTB-215; Call sign: NUVD
- Fate: Disposed, 1957

General characteristics
- Class & type: Cahto-class large harbor tug
- Displacement: 410 long tons (420 t)
- Length: 110 ft (34 m)
- Beam: 27 ft (8.2 m)
- Draft: 11 ft 4 in (3.45 m)
- Installed power: 1,000 shp (750 kW)
- Propulsion: Diesel engine; 1 × Screw
- Speed: 12 kn (22 km/h; 14 mph)
- Complement: 12
- Armament: 2 × .50-caliber machine guns

USS Achigan (YT/YTB-218) was a Cahto-class large harbor tug in the service of the United States Navy. A French-Canadian rendering of the word ashigan which, in Chippewa and Algonquian dialects, is the name of the smallmouth bass.

== Construction ==
Achigan (YT-218) was laid down on 23 July 1943, at Ipswich, Massachusetts, by W. A. Robinson, Inc.; reclassified a large harbor tug YTB-218 on 15 May 1944; launched on 4 October 1944; and placed in service on 9 January 1945.

== Service history ==
Assigned to the 4th Naval District, Achigan spent most of her naval career at the Philadelphia Naval Shipyard. On the afternoon of 8 January 1946, she sank at Philadelphia, as a result of a collision with General J. C. Breckinridge (AP-176). Later salvaged, the tug returned to service at Philadelphia, in mid-1947. Achigan served there until the summer of 1956, when she was transferred to the 6th Naval District. The meager record of her service indicates that the tug served in the 6th Naval District into 1957, and was disposed of later that year.

== Bibliography ==
- "Achigan (YTB-218)". NavSource. 8 April 2011.
- "Achigan (YTB-218)". Dictionary of American Naval fighting ships. Naval History and Heritage Command. 9 July 2015. This article incorporates text from this source, which is in the public domain.
