= USS Blueback =

Two submarines of the United States Navy have been named USS Blueback, after a type of trout.

- USS Blueback (SS-326), served during World War II and then was sold to Turkey.
- USS Blueback (SS-581), was the last non-nuclear submarine to join the United States Navy.
