= USS Burges =

USS Burges may refer to the following ships operated by the United States Navy:

- USS Burges (BDE-12), was laid down on 8 December 1942 and launched on 26 January 1943. It was later renamed Edgar G. Chase (DE-16) . It was also transferred to the Royal Navy under the terms of the lend-lease agreement and commissioned there on 2 June 1943.
- USS Burges (BDE-16) was laid down on 14 March 1942 and launched on 26 September 1942. It was renamed Edgar G. Chase (DE-16) on 19 February 1943.
