= USS Baker =

USS Baker may refer to more than one United States Navy ship:

- USS Baker (DE-190), a destroyer escort in commission from 1943 to 1946
- USS Paul G. Baker, the name of more than one ship
- USS Mount Baker, the name of more than one ship
