= USS Active (1837) =

History

United States
- Name: Clara; Active
- Acquired: September 1837
- Out of service: c. July 1838
- Fate: Sold

General characteristics
- Type: Schooner
- Tonnage: 122
- Propulsion: Sail
- Complement: 50
- Armament: 2 x guns

USS Active, a schooner built in Baltimore as Clara, was purchased by the Navy in September 1837 for use in the Wilkes Exploring Expedition, but she was found to be unsuitable for that mission. Under the command of Lt. William G. Woolsey, she made a brief cruise along the eastern seaboard serving as a relief ship for merchantmen in distress. She was sold during the summer, some sources suggest July 1838.

== Notes ==
Citations

== Bibliography ==
Online sources

- "Active II (Schooner)". Dictionary of American Naval Fighting Ships. Naval History and Heritage Command. 11 June 2015. This article incorporates text from this source, which is in the public domain.
