= USS Bagaduce =

USS Bagaduce may refer to the following ships of the United States Navy:

- USS Bagaduce (AT-21), lead ship of her class, laid down in 1918 and struck in 1946.
- USS Bagaduce (ATA-194) a Sotoyomo-class fleet tug laid down in 1944 and serving the Navy until 1958 and the United States Coast Guard as Modoc (WMEC-194) until 1979.
