= A-1 (SP-1370) =

Patrol vessel of the United States Navy

History

United States
- Name: A-1
- Builder: Sillit Buchanan
- Launched: 1911
- Acquired: 6 October 1917
- Fate: unknown

General characteristics
- Displacement: 6.16 t (6 long tons; 7 short tons)
- Length: 31 ft 2 in (9.50 m)
- Complement: 6

A-1 (SP-1370) was a converted houseboat used by the United States Navy during World War I. She was assigned the section patrol craft number SP-1370.

The A-1 was built in 1911 by Sillit Buchanan. Early in the war, the houseboat was inspected for possible naval service, and was taken over from F. E. Wright of San Pedro, California on 6 October 1917. The vessel was placed into service for the Navy on 30 December 1917. She operated in the waters of southern California through the end of World War I. Her logs end on 9 December 1918. So far no record of the boat's subsequent fate has survived.
