= USS Alexander H. Erickson =

Tugboat of the United States Navy

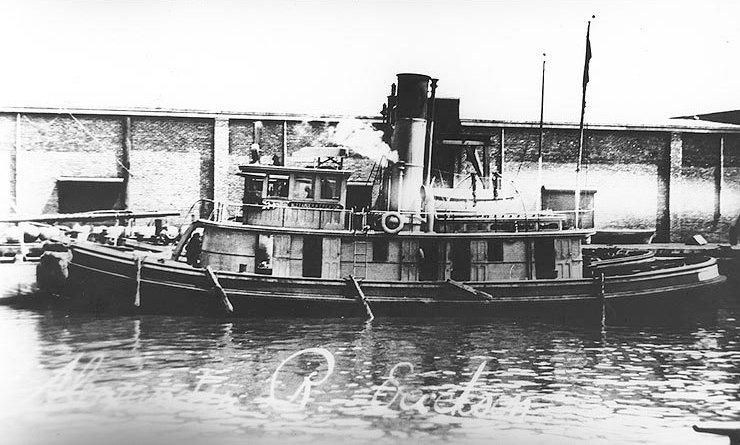
- SP-2298 photographed prior to World War I.

History

United States
- Name: Alexander H. Erickson
- Builder: Hahn and Miller, New Baltimore, NY
- Launched: 1917
- Acquired: 9 March 1918
- Stricken: 28 August 1919
- Fate: Returned to her owner, the Olsen Water and Towing Co., New York City

General characteristics
- Displacement: 150 t
- Length: 66 ft 6 in (20.27 m)
- Beam: 19 ft (5.8 m)
- Draft: 7 ft 6 in (2.29 m)
- Speed: 9 knots (17 km/h; 10 mph)
- Complement: 4

USS Alexander H. Erickson (SP-2298)—a tug built in 1917 by Hahn and Miller of New Baltimore, NY, for the Olsen Water and Towing Co., of New York City—was inspected in the 3rd Naval District (New York) on 4 February 1918 and was reported as taken over by the Navy on 9 March 1918. The operations of this harbor tug—which was assigned the identification number (Id. No. 2298)-are not reflected in any logs, but sources indicate that her ultimate duty was to handle barges at Norfolk, VA. Recorded as transferred from 3d to 5th Naval District on 20 August 1919, her service in that locale was apparently quite short, since the same source indicates that she was returned to her owner on 28 August 1919. Her name was struck from the Navy list on the same day.
