= USS Antrim =

Two ships of the United States Navy have been named Antrim:

- USS Antrim (AK-159)
- USS Antrim (FFG-20)
