= USS Avalon =

USS Avalon may refer to more than one United States Navy ship:

- USS Avalon (1908), a motorboat acquired for use as a patrol boat in 1917 and returned to her owner in 1918 perhaps without having been commissioned;
- USS Blue Ridge (ID-2432), a steamer in commission from 1918 to 1919, renamed USS Avalon for her last three days under U.S. Navy control;
- DSRV-2 Avalon, a deep submergence rescue vehicle launched in 1971 and decommissioned in 2000.
