= USS Barbel =

Two submarines of the United States Navy have been named Barbel, after the barbel, a type of European carp.

- USS Barbel (SS-316), was a Balao-class submarine commissioned in April 1944 and lost at sea sometime in February 1945.
- USS Barbel (SS-580), was the lead ship of her class and in service from 1959 to 1989.
