= USS Alabama (1838) =

Steamship of the United States Navy

History

United States
- Name: USS Alabama
- Namesake: American state of Alabama
- Completed: 1838
- Fate: Sold at auction October 1849; later grounded

General characteristics
- Type: steamship
- Displacement: 676 ton
- Installed power: Steam
- Propulsion: Sidewheel

The second USS Alabama was a wooden-hull sidewheel steamship briefly in the United States Navy.

Alabama was built in 1838 at Baltimore, Maryland. She apparently operated under the aegis of the War Department during the Mexican–American War (1846-1848), carrying troops that participated in the capture of Veracruz, Mexico. After the close of hostilities, the War Department transferred Alabama to the Navy Department pursuant to the Act of Congress of 3 March 1849. The latter, however, found the ship "unsuitable for naval purposes" and sold her at public auction, at New Orleans, Louisiana, in October 1849. Records of her naval service (if any) have not been found.

It does not appear that she did in fact serve in the United States Navy, since her name does not appear in any contemporary listings of naval vessels, nor do any deck logs exist. She ultimately foundered, stranding on Gun Key, in the Bahamas, on 12 July 1852. There were no deaths in the grounding.
