= USS Bluefish =

Two ships of the United States Navy have borne the name USS Bluefish, after the bluefish (Pomatomus saltatrix).

- USS Bluefish (SS-222), was a Gato-class submarine, commissioned in 1943 and struck in 1959.
- USS Bluefish (SSN-675), was a Sturgeon-class submarine, commissioned in 1971 and struck in 1996.
