= USS Abinago =

Tugboat of the United States Navy

History

United States
- Name: Abinago
- Namesake: In the morning (Navajo language)
- Builder: Ira S. Bushey and Sons, Brooklyn, New York
- Laid down: 25 September 1944
- Launched: 22 December 1944
- Acquired: 14 June 1945
- Out of service: May 1947
- In service: October 1950
- Out of service: March 1967
- In service: February 1968
- Out of service: 1973
- Reclassified: Medium harbor tug, February 1962
- Stricken: 1 May 1975
- Identification: Hull symbol: YTB-493; Hull symbol: YTM-493
- Fate: Sold to the University of Georgia, 21 November 1975

General characteristics
- Class & type: Pessacus-class large harbor tug
- Displacement: 240 long tons (240 t)
- Length: 100 ft (30 m)
- Beam: 25 ft (7.6 m)
- Draft: 19 ft (5.8 m)
- Installed power: Diesel engine
- Propulsion: 1 × Propeller
- Speed: 11 kn (20 km/h; 13 mph)
- Complement: 10

USS Abinago (YTB-493/YTM-493) was a Pessacus-class large harbor tug in the service of the United States Navy. Her name means "in the morning" in the Navajo language.

She was laid down on 25 September 1944 at Brooklyn, New York by Ira S. Bushey and Sons, launched on 22 December 1944, and delivered to the Navy on 14 June 1945.

== Service history ==
Placed in service with the 1st Fleet, the tug served on the west coast until May 1947, when she was placed in reserve at San Diego. By January 1949, the ship had moved to the 15th Naval District in Panama, but apparently remained in reserve. In October 1950, she was placed back in service for duty in the 5th Naval District, based at Norfolk. Late in 1958, Abinago was reassigned from the 5th Naval District to "advanced bases, Atlantic." However, extant records reveal no specific facts concerning her duties. During her somewhat over eight years in that assignment, the vessel was reclassified a medium harbor tug in February 1962 and simultaneously redesignated YTM-493. Abinago was in the Atlantic Inactive Fleet between March 1967 and February 1968 and then resumed active service with the Atlantic Fleet.

In 1973, the tug was listed as active in the 5th Naval District but preparing for inactivation. Her name was struck from the Naval Vessel Register on 1 May 1975 and she was turned over to the Government Services Administration for disposal. Sold to the University of Georgia Institute of Natural Resources, she was transferred on 21 November 1975.
