= USS Agwidale =

Cargo ship of the United States Navy

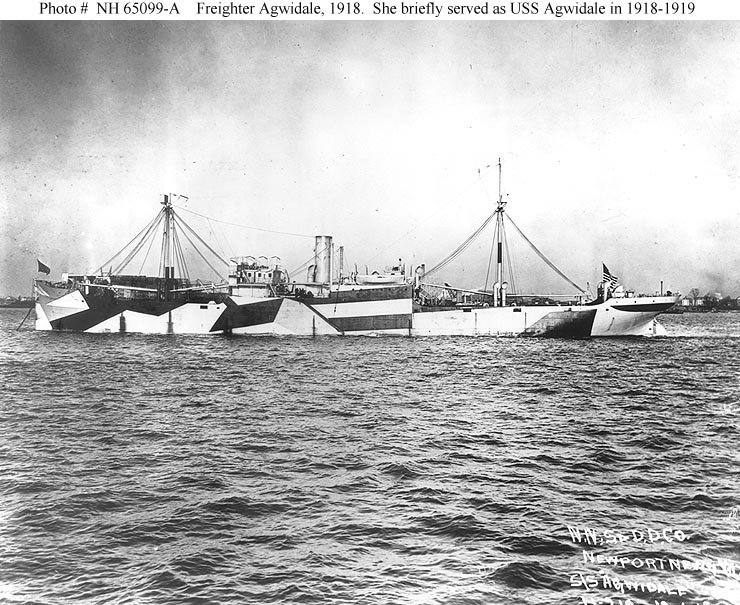
- Photographed by her builder, the Newport News Shipbuilding and Dry Dock Company, Newport News, Virginia, probably upon completion of construction in 1918.

History

United States
- Name: USS Agwidale (SP-4464)
- Builder: Newport News Shipbuilding and Dry Dock Co., Newport News, VA
- Launched: 1917
- Commissioned: 16 November 1918
- Decommissioned: 11 April 1919
- Fate: Sold to China in 1946 and renamed Wei Ming. Fate unknown.

General characteristics
- Displacement: 10,410 t
- Length: 385 ft (117 m)
- Beam: 53 ft (16 m)
- Draft: 24 ft (7.3 m)
- Depth of hold: 30 ft (9.1 m)
- Speed: 11 knots (20 km/h)
- Crew: 76
- Armament: none

While still under construction, the single-screw steel-hulled freighter SP-4464 was acquired by the Navy from the Newport News Shipbuilding and Dry Dock Co., Newport News, Va. near the end of the first World War and assigned to the Naval Overseas Transportation service (NOTS). Commissioned at Newport News on 16 November 1918.

Agwidale shifted to the Chesapeake and Ohio (C&O) Piers at Norfolk on the 24th, and there took on board a cargo of motor tractors. On 4 December 1918 it sailed for the Virginia capes, and at 1300 that day sighted a disabled seaplane off her port bow.

Agwidale altered course accordingly, and reached the downed Curtiss HS-2L flying boat soon thereafter, maneuvering to take the plane in tow. She apparently then headed back toward Hampton Roads, with the plane—still occupied by its three-man crew— traveling in tow astern. Eventually, at 1512 the subchaser USS SC-195 came alongside and relieved the freighter of the towing chores to take the plane back to Hampton Roads.

Two days later, having returned to an anchorage off the Newport News Shipbuilding and Drydock Co., Agwidale set out for France, and reached La Pallice, en route to Rochefort, on 19 December. After discharging cargo at Rochefort, Agwidale, in ballast, set out for the United States on 29 January 1919. Mooring at Hoboken, NJ on the afternoon of 15 February, the cargoman cleared New York Harbor 10 days later, bound for the Netherlands on its second and last voyage under the NOTS aegis.

Agwidale reached Rotterdam via the British Isles on the afternoon of 12 March. She discharged her cargo over the ensuing days, and, on the morning of the 21st, let go all lines and got underway to return to the United States. She returned home without incident and tied up alongside Pier 15, Hoboken, shortly after noon on 4 April. Three days later, she received orders to prepare for decommissioning.

At noon on 11 April 1919, Agwidale was decommissioned and turned over to representatives of the United States Shipping Board, a civilian crew replacing a token Navy one the following afternoon. Agwidale retained her name for the rest of her days under American registry, which extended through the depression years and World War II. Initially operated by the Clyde Steamship Co., she later worked under the flag of the Clyde Mallory Line, and, still later, Agwilines Incorporated, until she was sold to Chinese interests in 1946 and renamed Wei Ming. Her subsequent fate is a mystery.
