= USS Araner =

Two ships of the United States Navy have been named Araner for one who hails from the Aran Islands.

- USS Araner (IX-57), was a wooden-hulled auxiliary ketch named Faith built in 1926 and acquired by the Navy on 27 January 1942.
- USS Araner (IX-226), was the Liberty ship Juan de Fuca acquired by the Navy on 23 September 1945.
