= USS Brontes =

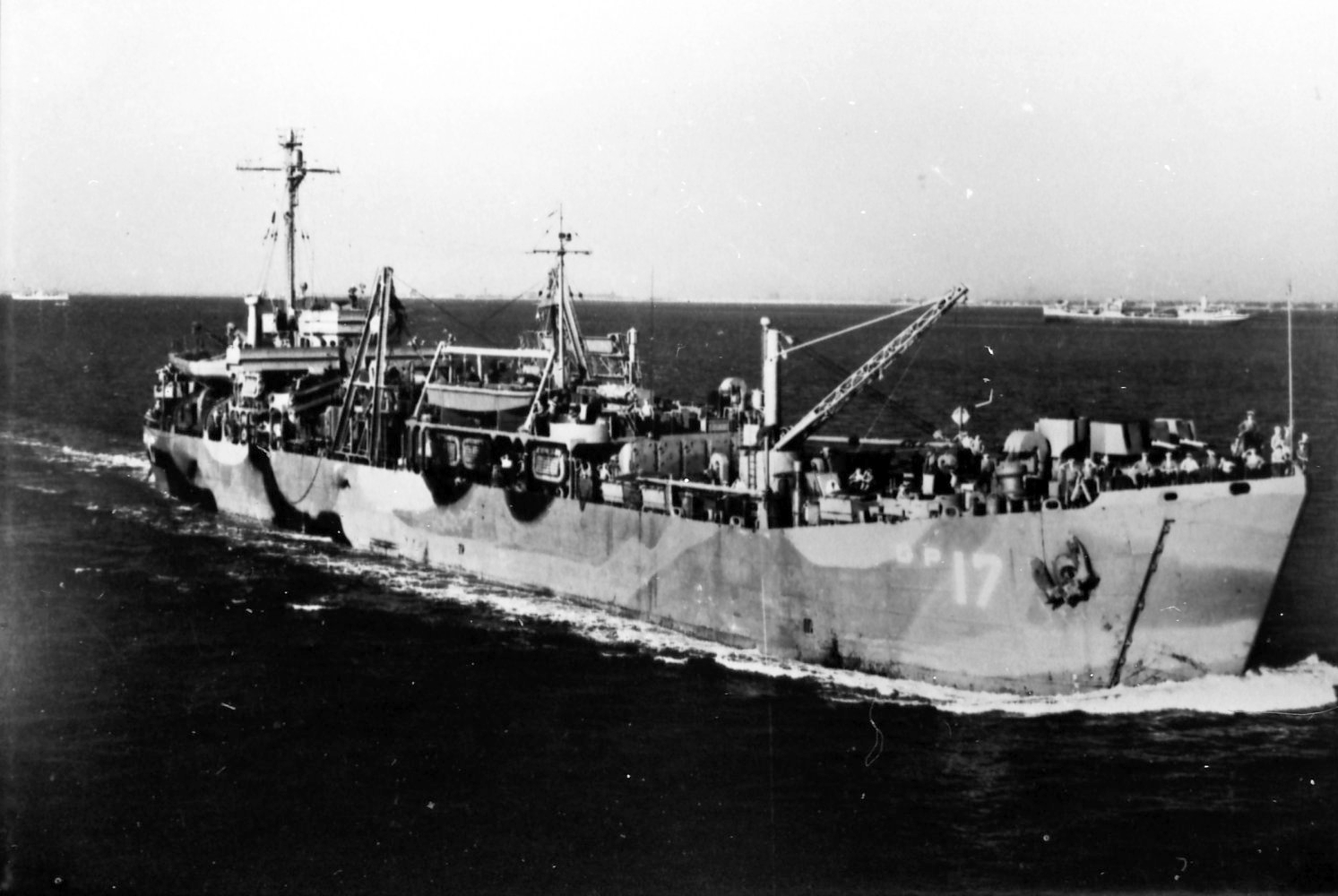
- Brontes underway, circa 1945.

History

United States
- Name: USS Brontes
- Laid down: 15 November 1944
- Launched: 6 February 1945
- Acquired: February 1945
- Commissioned: 17 February 1945
- Decommissioned: 14 March 1946
- In service: 1945
- Out of service: 1959
- Identification: Call sign NJYW
- Fate: Wrecked 27 October 1959 Manzanilla, Mexico. Constructive total loss

General characteristics
- Displacement: 4,100 tons
- Length: 328 feet
- Beam: 50 feet
- Draft: 11 feet 2 inches
- Propulsion: Two General Motors 12-568A Diesel engines
- Speed: 12 Knots
- Complement: 41 Officers, 245 Enlisted
- Armament: One 3 in (76 mm)/50 Dual Purpose Mount

USS Brontes was a Portunus-Class Motor Torpedo Boat Tender in service with the United States Navy during World War II.

== Ship history ==
Brontes, although reclassified AGP-17, 14 August 1944, was launched 6 February 1945 as LST-1125 by Chicago Bridge and Iron Co., Seneca, Ill.; sponsored by Mrs. June Elizabeth Reimer; and placed in reduced commission 17 February 1945; placed out of commission 10 March 1945; underwent conversion to a motor torpedo boat tender; and recommissioned as Brontes (AGP-17) 14 August 1945.

On 26 September 1945, Brontes got underway for New Orleans, where she arrived 3 October. At New Orleans she participated in the Navy Day activities and then remained to service torpedo boats. In December 1945 she sailed to Washington, D. C., to participate in the "parade of torpedo boats" held in conjunction with a Victory Bond drive. On 20 December 1945, she departed Washington for New York and pre inactivation overhaul. Brontes was decommissioned 14 March 1946 and struck from the Naval Register on 17 April 1946.

=== Merchant service ===
Following being struck from the Naval Register, she was sold for merchant service on 28 March 1947 and renamed M/V GP-17. Later that year, she was renamed M/V Barbara. In 1948, she was resold to Mineral Transport Corporation in Liberia, renamed M/V Diane, and reflagged Liberian. After 8 years of service to the Mineral Transport Corp., she was resold in 1956 to Transportes Marimes, and reflagged Mexican as M/V Xalapa. She would serve another 3 years.

=== Ship's fate ===
On 27 October 1959, while in Manzanillo, Mexico, the 1959 Mexico Hurricane swept through, driving her aground. She was declared a total constructive loss.

== Ship awards ==
- American Campaign Medal
- World War II Victory Medal
