= USS Algol =

Two ships of the United States Navy have been named Algol, after a fixed star in the constellation Perseus.

- USS Algol (AKA-54) was an Andromeda-class attack cargo ship that served from World War II until 1970.
- SS Algol (T-AKR-287), formerly T-AK-287, is a container ship operated by the Military Sealift Command since 1984.
