= USS Albacore =

USS Albacore has been the name of more than one United States Navy ship, and may refer to:

- USS Albacore (SP-751), a patrol vessel in commission from 1917 to 1919
- USS Albacore (SS-218), a fleet submarine commissioned in 1942 and sunk in 1944 off southern Hokkaido, Japan
- USS Albacore (AGSS-569), an experimental test platform submarine in commission from 1953 to 1972; now on display in Portsmouth, New Hampshire
