= USS Alamingo =

Tugboat of the United States Navy

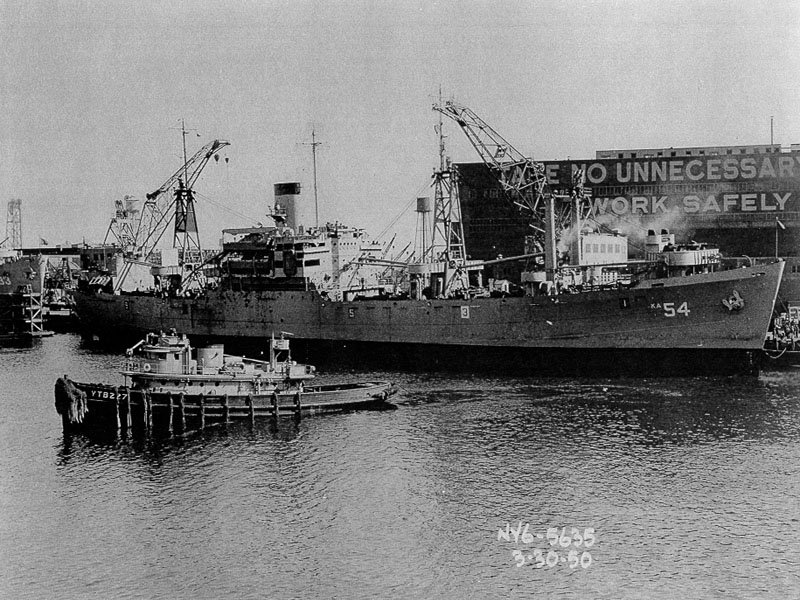
- USS Alamingo (YT-227) underway at Norfolk, VA., 30 March 1950, USS Algol (AKA-54) is moored pierside in the background.

History

United States
- Name: USS Alamingo (YT-227)
- Builder: Mathis Yacht Building Company, Camden, NJ
- Laid down: 13 April 1944
- Launched: 21 October 1944
- In service: 19 February 1945
- Stricken: September 1964
- Fate: unknown

General characteristics
- Class & type: Cahto-class district harbor tug
- Displacement: 410 t
- Length: 110 ft (34 m)
- Beam: 27 ft (8.2 m)
- Draft: 11 ft 4 in (3.45 m)
- Propulsion: diesel, single screw
- Speed: 12 knots (22 km/h)
- Complement: 12
- Armament: two .50-cal machine guns

USS Alamingo (YT-227) was laid down on 13 April 1944 at Camden, New Jersey, by the Mathis Yacht Building Co.; reclassified a large harbor tug and redesignated YTB-227 on 15 May 1944; launched on 21 October 1944; and placed in service on 19 February 1945.

Initially assigned to the 7th Naval District, Alamingo plied the coastal waters of Florida until sometime in 1947. At that time, she was transferred to the 5th Naval District and based at Norfolk, Virginia. After almost a decade of service in the Chesapeake Bay area, the large harbor tug was reassigned to the 3d Naval District late in 1956. She spent the remaining years of her naval career operating in and around New York. In February 1962, Alamingo was reclassified a medium harbor tug and was redesignated YTM-227. Her name was stricken from the Navy list in September 1964.
