= USS Affray =

Two ships of the United States Navy have been named Affray.

- USS Affray (AMc-112), a minesweeper in service 2 December 1941.
- USS Affray (MSO-511), a minesweeper commissioned 8 December 1958.
