= USS Alabama (SP-1052) =

United States Navy ship

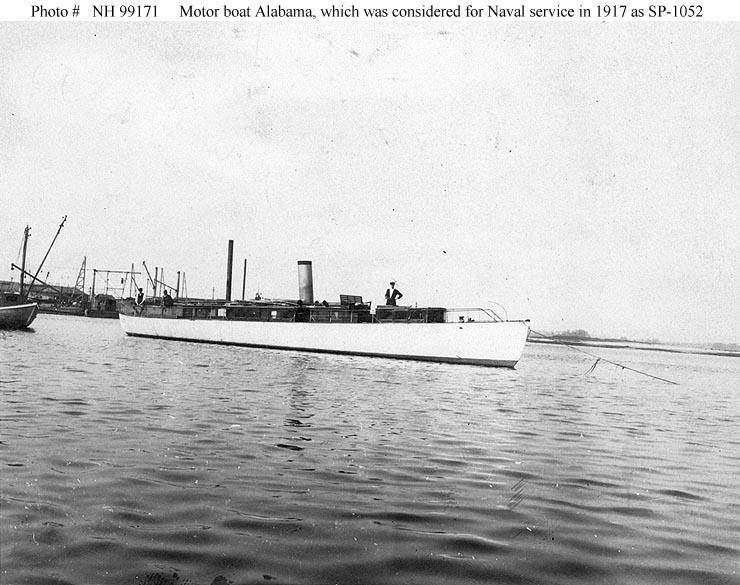
- Alabama (American Motor Boat, 1906) At anchor in a harbor, prior to World War I. This pleasure craft was enrolled in the Naval Coast Defense Reserve on 26 July 1917 and given the registry number SP-1052. However, she appears not to have been taken over for actual Naval service.

History

United States
- Name: USS Alabama
- Namesake: American state of Alabama
- Builder: George Lawley and Sons, South Boston, Massachusetts
- Launched: 1906

General characteristics
- Type: motor boat
- Length: 69 ft (21 m)

The fifth USS Alabama was a section patrol craft in the United States Navy, but probably never saw active naval service.

Alabama was a 69-foot motor boat built in 1906 at South Boston, Massachusetts, by George Lawley and Sons. She was inspected by the Navy in the summer of 1917. Records indicate that on 25 July 1917 the Navy concluded an agreement with her owners, the American and British Manufacturing Co., Bridgeport, Connecticut, for possible future acquisition of the boat. By the terms of that agreement, Alabama — assigned the designation SP-1052 —- was "enrolled in the Naval Coast Defense Reserve." All indications are, however, that Alabama never saw actual naval service, possibly remaining "enrolled" in a reserve capacity, since she does not appear on contemporary lists of commandeered, chartered, or leased small craft actually used by the Navy during World War I.
