= USS Banshee =

USS Banshee is a name used more than once by the U.S. Navy:

- USS Banshee (1862), a gunboat commissioned 14 June 1864.
- USS Banshee (IX-178), a tanker which served in both World War I and World War II.
