= USS Bazely =

USS Bazely may refer to the following ships of the United States Navy:

- USS Bazely (1863), a Union Navy ship, known by a shortened version of her original merchant name, J. E. Bazely
- USS Bazely (BDE-2), a World War II destroyer escort
