= USS Belmont =

USS Belmont is a name used more than once by the U.S. Navy:

- USS Belmont (1917), a barge that served the 3d Naval District during World War I.
- USS Belmont (AGTR-4), a technical research ship commissioned 2 November 1964.
