= USS Brilliant (ID-1329) =

Brilliant
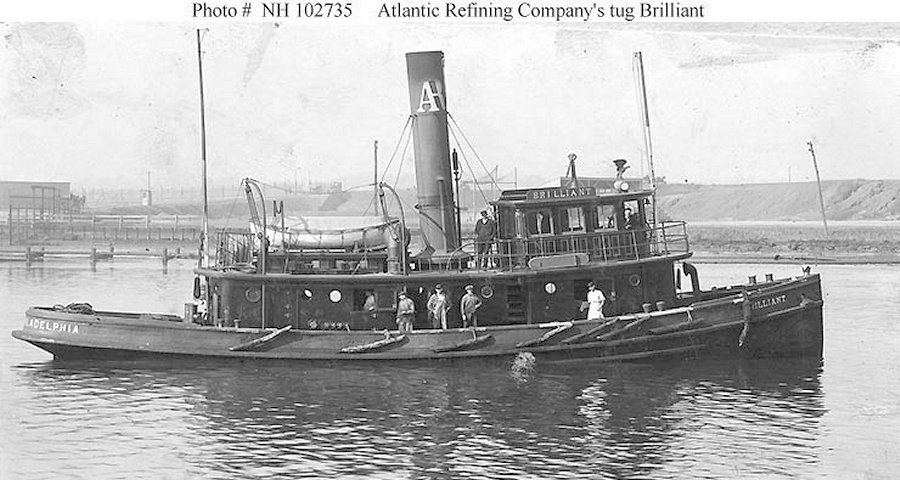
- Brilliant sometime between 1903 and 1917, possibly at Philadelphia, Pennsylvania.

History

United States
- Owner: Atlantic Refining Company
- Builder: Neafie & Levy, Philadelphia, Pennsylvania
- Completed: 1903
- Notes: Registered as ID-1329 for potential U.S. Navy service

General characteristics
- Type: Tug
- Displacement: 81 tons
- Length: 74 ft (23 m)
- Beam: 18 ft (5.5 m)
- Draft: 9 ft (2.7 m)
- Installed power: 500 ihp (370 kW) steam engine
- Propulsion: Single screw
- Crew: 6

USS Brilliant (ID-1329) was the proposed name and hull classification for a tug that never actually served in the United States Navy.

Brilliant was a commercial tug built in 1903 by the Neafie & Levy at Philadelphia, Pennsylvania. During the period of the United States' participation in World War I, the Navy inspected her for possible acquisition and assigned her the hull classification ID-1329 in anticipation of commissioning her as USS Brilliant. However, the Navy never took possession of her, and she remained in civilian service with her owners, the Atlantic Refining Company of Philadelphia.
