= USS Blue Light =

Tugboat of the United States Navy

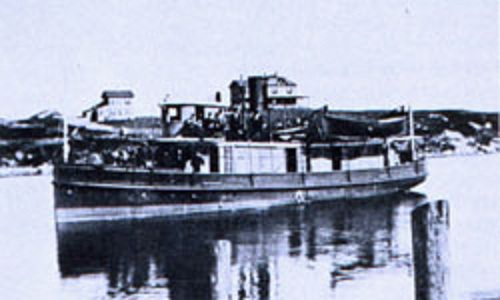
- USS Blue Light serving with the Fish Commission as USFC Blue Light, ca. 1873-75

History

United States
- Name: USS Blue Light
- Laid down: 1863
- Launched: February 27, 1864
- Commissioned: circa March 1864
- Decommissioned: circa April 1865
- In service: June 27, 1873
- Out of service: September 30, 1875
- Stricken: 1883 (est.)
- Homeport: Boston Navy Yard; Washington Navy Yard; New London, Connecticut
- Fate: Sold, September 27, 1883

General characteristics
- Type: Tugboat
- Displacement: 103 long tons (105 t)
- Length: Unknown
- Beam: Unknown
- Draft: Unknown
- Propulsion: Steam engine; screw-propelled
- Speed: Unknown
- Complement: Unknown
- Armament: 1 × gun

USS Blue Light was a steam tug built for the United States Navy during the American Civil War. She was used by the Union Navy as an ordnance tugboat in support of the Union Navy blockade of Confederate waterways.

== Blue Light configured to carry ammunition to Union Navy ships ==
Blue Light—a screw tug laid down in 1863 by the Portsmouth Navy Yard in Kittery, Maine—was launched on February 27, 1864, and fitted out to carry ammunition from magazines ashore to warships anchored far out in harbors where they would not endanger people and property on the waterfront.

== Assigned to the Boston Navy Yard throughout the war ==
The little steamer was assigned to the Boston Navy Yard and operated at that base through the end of the Civil War, supplying ammunition to Union warships preparing for operations along the Confederate coast or on the South's inland waters.

== Post-Civil War operations ==
Following the collapse of the Confederacy, Blue Light continued to perform duty as an ordnance tug at Boston, Massachusetts, until 1870. From 1871 to June 1873, she served as a yard tug at the Washington Navy Yard.

Since no logs recording the vessel's operations before this time apparently up to this point are extant, Blue Light served the Navy in a non-commissioned status. The tug was placed in commission at Washington, D.C., on June 27, 1873, and, the following day, sailed for the coast of Maine to perform special service under the United States Commissioner on Fish and Fisheries. At the end of this assignment, she arrived at Portsmouth, New Hampshire, on September 6, and she was decommissioned there on the 13th.

== Final operations, decommissioning, and sale ==
Recommissioned on June 12, 1874, the ship proceeded to New London, Connecticut, for a tour of duty as a yard tug which lasted until Blue Light was decommissioned again on September 30, 1875, and laid up into 1879. No records of her status for the following four years seem to have survived, but we do know that the tug was sold at Great Neck, New York, on September 27, 1883.
