= USS Alert (SP-511) =

Patrol vessel of the United States Navy

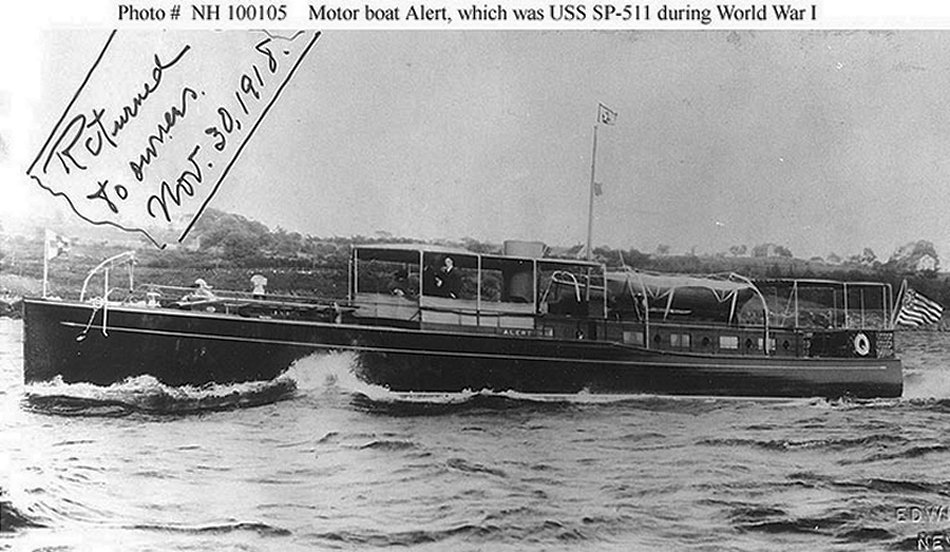
- Photographed prior to World War I by Edwin Levick, New York City.

History

United States
- Name: USS Alert SP-511
- Builder: George Lawley and Sons, Neponset, Massachusetts
- Launched: 1913
- Acquired: 12 May 1917
- Commissioned: 31 May 1917
- Decommissioned: 25 November 1918
- Renamed: SP-511 in April 1918
- Fate: Returned to her owner, DeWitt T. Cuyler, Philadelphia, PA, 30 November 1918

General characteristics
- Displacement: 39 t
- Length: 75 ft (23 m)
- Beam: 12 ft (3.7 m)
- Draft: 3 ft 9 in (1.14 m)
- Speed: 15.6 knots (28.9 km/h; 18.0 mph)
- Complement: 11
- Armament: one 1-pounder

The motorboat Alert built in Neponset, Massachusetts., by George Lawley and Sons, in 1913—was acquired by the US Navy under free-lease on 12 May 1917 from DeWitt T. Cuyler, of Philadelphia., for use as a section patrol boat. Designated SP-511, Alert was commissioned on 31 May 1917.

Assigned to the 1st Naval District, Alert performed local patrol duty at the Portsmouth, NH Navy Yard and in the Boston area for the remainder of World War I. Decommissioned at Lawley's shipyard on 25 November 1918, two weeks after the signing of the armistice, the boat was returned to her owner on 30 November 1918.
