= USS Anguilla Bay =

USS Anguilla Bay may refer to the following ships operated by the United States Navy:

- USS Anguilla Bay (ACV-58), renamed Corregidor prior to launch
- USS Anguilla Bay (CVE-96), renamed Salamaua prior to launch
