= USS Ability =

Three ships of the United States Navy have borne the name Ability.

- USS Ability (PYc-28), was a yacht used for anti-submarine warfare during World War II.
- USS Ability (MSO-519), was the lead ship of the Ability-class minesweepers.
- USS Ability (AFDL-7), was a small auxiliary floating dry dock.
