= USS Albuquerque =

Two ships of the United States Navy have been named Albuquerque, after the city of Albuquerque, New Mexico.

- USS Albuquerque (PF-7), was a patrol frigate commissioned in 1943, loaned to the Soviet Union in August 1945 and returned 1949, then loaned to Japan in 1953.
- USS Albuquerque (SSN-706), was a Los Angeles-class nuclear attack submarine commissioned in 1983 and decommissioned in 2017.
