= USS Almax II =

Patrol vessel of the United States Navy

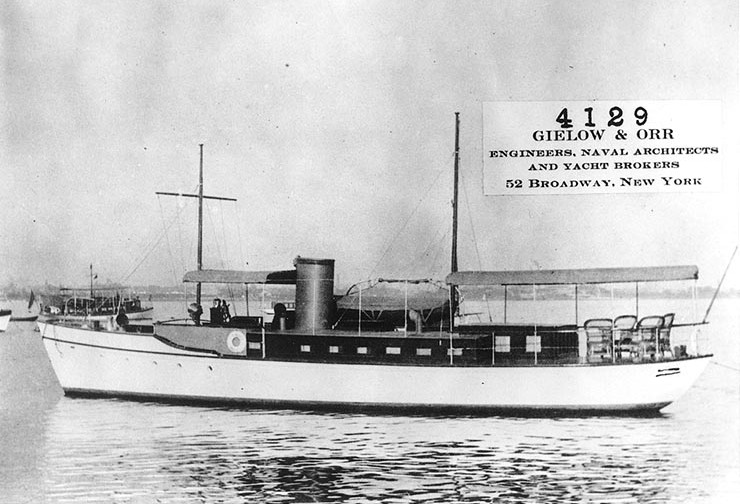
- Almax II as a private motorboat sometime between 1912 and 1917.

History

United States
- Name: Almax II
- Owner: Mr. F. Mayer, Baltimore, Maryland
- Builder: Salisbury Marine Construction Company, Salisbury, Maryland
- Launched: 1912
- Fate: Acquired by United States Navy 18 May 1917

United States
- Name: USS Almax II
- Namesake: Previous name retained
- Operator: United States Navy
- Acquired: 18 May 1917
- Commissioned: 18 May 1917
- Decommissioned: 28 March 1919
- Home port: Newport News and Norfolk, Virginia
- Fate: Transferred to U.S. Coast and Geodetic Survey 28 March 1919; Transferred to U.S. Navy 21 February 1920; Sold 14 July 1920

United States
- Name: USC&GS Almax II
- Namesake: Previous name retained
- Operator: U.S. Coast and Geodetic Survey
- Acquired: 28 March 1919
- Fate: Transferred to U.S. Navy 21 February 1920

General characteristics (as U.S. Navy patrol boat)
- Type: Patrol boat
- Tonnage: 22 gross tons
- Length: 56 feet 9 inches (17.3 m)
- Beam: 11 feet 11 inches (3.6 m)
- Draft: 3 feet 6 inches (1.1 m) (aft)
- Speed: 11.4 miles per hour (9.9 kn; 18.3 km/h)
- Crew: 8 enlisted personnel
- Armament: two 1-pounder guns; two machine guns

USS Almax II (SP-268) was a motorboat acquired by the United States Navy for use as a patrol boat during World War I. She was outfitted with light guns and assigned patrol duty in the Chesapeake Bay area. Post-war she served with the United States Coast and Geodetic Survey before she was sold in 1920.

== Construction ==
Almax II was a private motorboat constructed in 1912 at Salisbury, Maryland, by the Salisbury Marine Construction Company. On 18 May 1917, the U.S. Navy acquired her from Mr. Jacob Mayer of Baltimore, Maryland, for World War I service as a patrol boat. She was commissioned USS Almax II (SP-268) on 18 May 1917.

== Service history ==
Assigned to the section patrol, Almax II cruised the waters of the 5th Naval District through the end of World War I. She served with Squadron 2 and operated in the Chesapeake Bay area primarily between Newport News and Norfolk, Virginia.

After the war ended in November 1918, the boat continued to serve until 28 March 1919 when she was transferred to the United States Department of Commerce for use by the United States Coast and Geodetic Survey. The Coast and Geodetic Survey returned Almax II to Navy custody on 21 February 1920.

== Disposal ==
Almax II was sold on 14 July 1920 and, presumably, her name was struck from the Navy list at that time.
