= USS Barnegat =

USS Barnegat may refer to the following ships of the United States Navy:

- USS Barnegat (SP-1232), a steel-hulled, single-screw, ocean-going tugboat completed in 1891
- USS Barnegat (AVP-10), was a seaplane tender, launched on 23 May 1941

== See also ==
- United States lightship Barnegat (LV-79)
