= USS Brave (IX-78) =

History

United States
- Name: USS Brave
- Operator: United States Navy
- Commissioned: 23 January 1943
- Decommissioned: 14 December 1944
- In service: 10 December 1942
- Fate: Transferred to the Maritime Commission for disposal

General characteristics
- Displacement: 110 tons
- Length: 98 ft 3 in (29.95 m)
- Beam: 23 ft 7 in (7.19 m)
- Draught: 10 ft (3.0 m)

USSBrave (IX-78), an unclassified miscellaneous vessel, was one of two ships of the United States Navy named for the quality of bravery. The other, in a rare case of simultaneous use of identical names, was the district patrol craft Brave (YP-425) serving at Norfolk, Virginia. (Note: Brave (YP-425) was never commissioned and thus did not bear the "U.S.S." prefix reserved for commissioned vessels. YP-425 was the 1930 yacht Rose B. acquired on 5 April 1942 and serving until 18 September 1945 under Commandant, 5th Naval District. (Covered under same DANFS reference.))

IX-78 was acquired by the Navy 10 August 1942 as Maitland Adams from the Gibbs Gas Engine Co., Jacksonville, Florida, repaired at the former owner's yard, placed in service 10 December 1942 and ordered to Key West, Florida. The vessel was commissioned at Key West on 23 January 1943 where she served at the Fleet Sound School as a training vessel for sonarmen throughout her career.

The vessel was placed out of commission on 14 December 1944 at the Naval Operating Base, Key West. Brave was transferred to the Maritime Commission for disposal 19 September 1946.
