= USS Antigone (AGP-16) =

Tender of the United States Navy

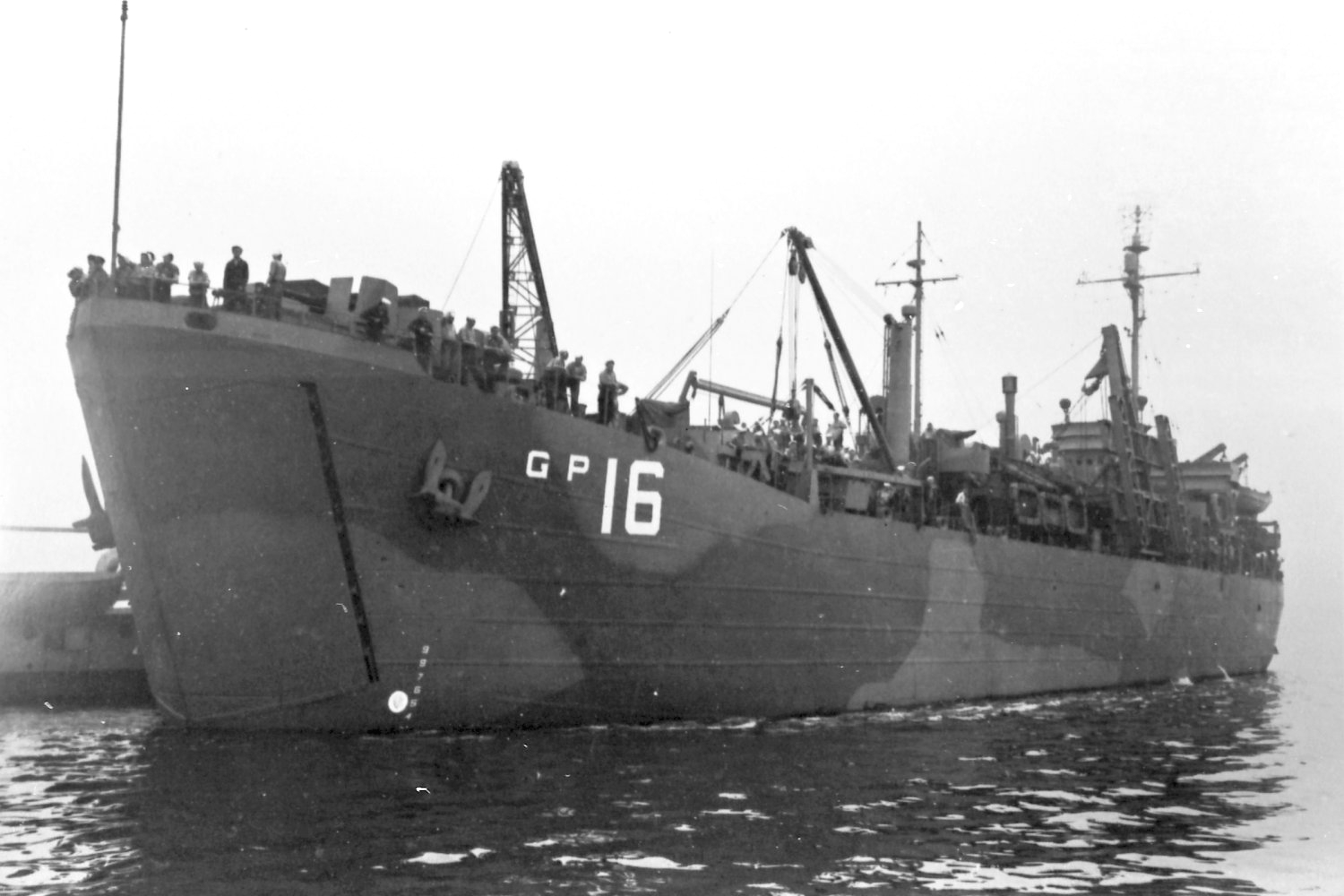
- Antigone circa 1945

History

United States
- Name: USS Antigone
- Namesake: The daughter of Oedipus and Jocasta in Greek mythology.
- Builder: Chicago Bridge & Iron Co.
- Laid down: 15 August 1944
- Launched: 27 October 1944
- Commissioned: 27 October 1944
- Decommissioned: 27 May 1946
- In service: 1944
- Out of service: 1946
- Stricken: 10 June 1947
- Identification: Ship International Radio Callsign: NJYN
- Fate: Transferred to the MARAD for disposal, 6 February 1948 and sold to Kaiser & Co. for scrapping

General characteristics
- Displacement: 4,100 tons
- Length: 328 feet
- Beam: 50 feet
- Draft: 11 feet 2 inches
- Propulsion: Two General Motors 12-568A Diesel engines
- Speed: 12 Knots
- Complement: 41 Officers, 245 Enlisted
- Armament: One 3 in (76 mm)/50 Dual Purpose Mount

USS Antigone was a Portunus-class Motor Torpedo Boat Tender in service with the United States Navy during World War II. Authorized originally as LST-773, She was reclassified Motor Torpedo Boat Tender, and laid down the next day at Chicago Bridge & Iron Co., Seneca, IL. On 27 October 1944, she was launched, and put into reduced commission for conversion to a Motor Torpedo Boat Tender. On 5 December 1944, she was decommissioned for the conversion at Maryland Drydock Co., Baltimore, MD. 160 days later, on 14 May 1945, Antigone was put into full commission. After serving in the Asiatic-Pacific Theater for a year, Antigone was decommissioned on 27 May 1946, at San Francisco. On 10 June 1947, she was struck from the Naval Register, and sold to the Maritime Administration for final disposal on 6 February 1948 and simultaneously sold to Kaiser & Co., for scrapping.

== Ship awards ==
- American Campaign Medal
- World War II Victory Medal
- Asiatic-Pacific Campaign Medal
