= USS Apalachicola =

Apalachicola is the name of two United States Navy ships, both named after Apalachicola, Florida;

- Apalachicola (YTB-767), a Natick-class tugboat in service from 1965–2002 (non-commissioned)
- USNS Apalachicola (T-EPF-13) is a Spearhead-class expeditionary fast transport commissioned in 2023 and currently in service.
