= USS Fall River =

USS Fall River may refer to:

- USS Fall River (CA-131) was a Baltimore-class cruiser, commissioned in 1945 and decommissioned in 1947
- USNS Fall River (T-EPF-4) is a Spearhead-class expeditionary fast transport
