= USNS Bethesda =

US Navy vessel

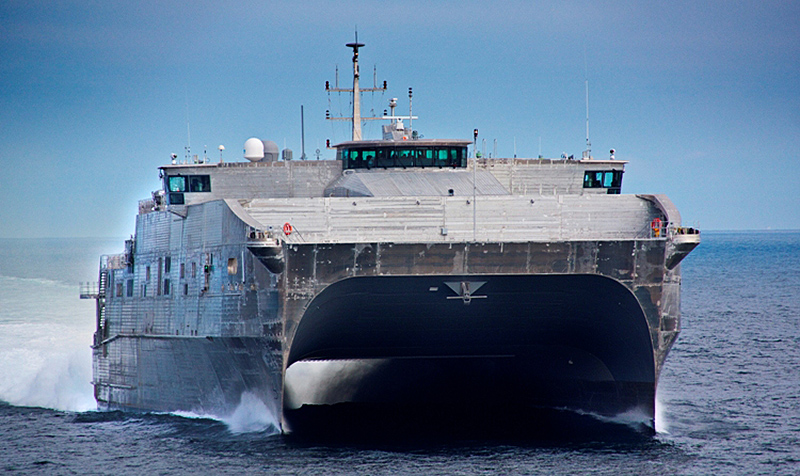
- USNS Spearhead, the lead ship of the design. Bethesda will likely be marked the same as a hospital ship, with the hull and superstructure painted all white, and bearing large red crosses.

History

United States
- Name: Bethesda
- Namesake: The Bethesda Medical Center, now part of the Walter Reed National Military Medical Center, in Bethesda, Maryland
- Operator: United States Navy's Military Sealift Command
- Builder: Austal USA
- In service: Delivery planned for December 2026
- Identification: Hull number: T-EMS-1
- Status: Announced

General characteristics
- Class & type: Bethesda-class expeditionary medical ship
- Length: 118.0 m (387 ft 2 in)
- Beam: 28.5 m (93 ft 6 in)
- Draft: 4.5 m (14 ft 9 in)
- Propulsion: 4 × MTU 20V8000 M71L diesel engines; 4 × ZF 60000NR2H reduction gears
- Speed: 43 knots (80 km/h; 49 mph)
- Troops: 312
- Crew: Capacity of 41, 22 in normal service
- Aviation facilities: Landing pad for medium helicopter

USNS Bethesda (T-EMS-1) will be the seventeenth overall Spearhead-class expeditionary fast transport, and first of her Expeditionary Medical Ship class, operated by the United States Navy's Military Sealift Command. On 15 May 2023, Secretary of the Navy Carlos Del Toro announced that the ship would be named after the Bethesda Medical Center, now part of the Walter Reed National Military Medical Center, in Bethesda, Maryland. She will be the first ship in the US Navy to carry the name.

== Expeditionary Medical Ship ==
Beginning with USNS Cody (EPF-14), the ships will be designated as EPF Flight II, with increased health services capabilities while still maintaining most of the original mission of the ship. The Flight II variant is designed to bring enhanced medical capabilities at the request of Combatant Commanders, and allows patients to recover onboard rather than in a higher-level facility. They can respond faster, and to more places than the Navy's larger, slower and unarmed hospital ships. The EPF Flight II design includes upgrades to the medical facilities for resuscitation and surgery, enhanced support of V-22 flight operations, and enhanced launch and recovery of 11-meter rigid inflatable boats.

In January 2023, the Navy announced that three Expeditionary Medical Ships (EMS) had been approved in the 2023 military budget. These will be T-EMS-1, T-EMS-2, and T-EMS-3. These are planned to be about 118m versus the earlier ships 103 metres (338 ft), and have a draft of 4.5 metres (15 ft) for operations in "austere ports". The EMS will have four operating rooms and 124 medical beds, separated into acute care, acute isolation, ICU, and ICU isolation spaces. Two 11-meter rigid-hulled inflatable boats allow for the transfer of patients from other ships or water rescue; the flight deck has room for a single V-22, or an H-53 or H-60 helicopter. Bethesda is planned for delivery by December 2026.
