= USS Burlington =

Two ships of the United States Navy have borne the name USS Burlington.

- USS Burlington (PF-51) was a Tacoma-class frigate named after the city of Burlington, Iowa
- USNS Burlington (T-EPF-10) is a Spearhead-class expeditionary fast transport named after the city of Burlington, Vermont
