= Carson City (disambiguation) =

Carson City may refer to:

== Places in the United States ==
- Carson City, Nevada, the capital of the state
- Carson City, Michigan
- Carson, California
- Carson City and Indian Village, a defunct amusement park in Catskill, New York

== Other uses ==
- Carson City (1952 film)
- USS Carson City, two ships of the U.S. Navy
