= Apalachicola =

Apalachicola may refer to:

- Apalachicola band, an association of Native American towns along the Apalachicola River in Florida in the early 19th century
- Apalachicola Province, an association of Native American towns on the Chattahoochee River in Alabama and Georgia that became the Lower Towns of the Muscogee Confederacy
- Apalachicola (tribal town), a Native American town that was the namesake of the Apalachicola Province

== Places ==
- Apalachicola, Florida
- Apalachicola River
- Apalachicola Bay
- Apalachicola National Forest
- Apalachicola Regional Airport
- Port of Apalachicola

== Railroad ==
- Apalachicola and Alabama Railroad
- Apalachicola Northern Railroad

== Ships ==
- Apalachicola (YTB-767), a tugboat in the United States Navy.
