= USNS Brunswick =

Spearhead-class expeditionary fast transport

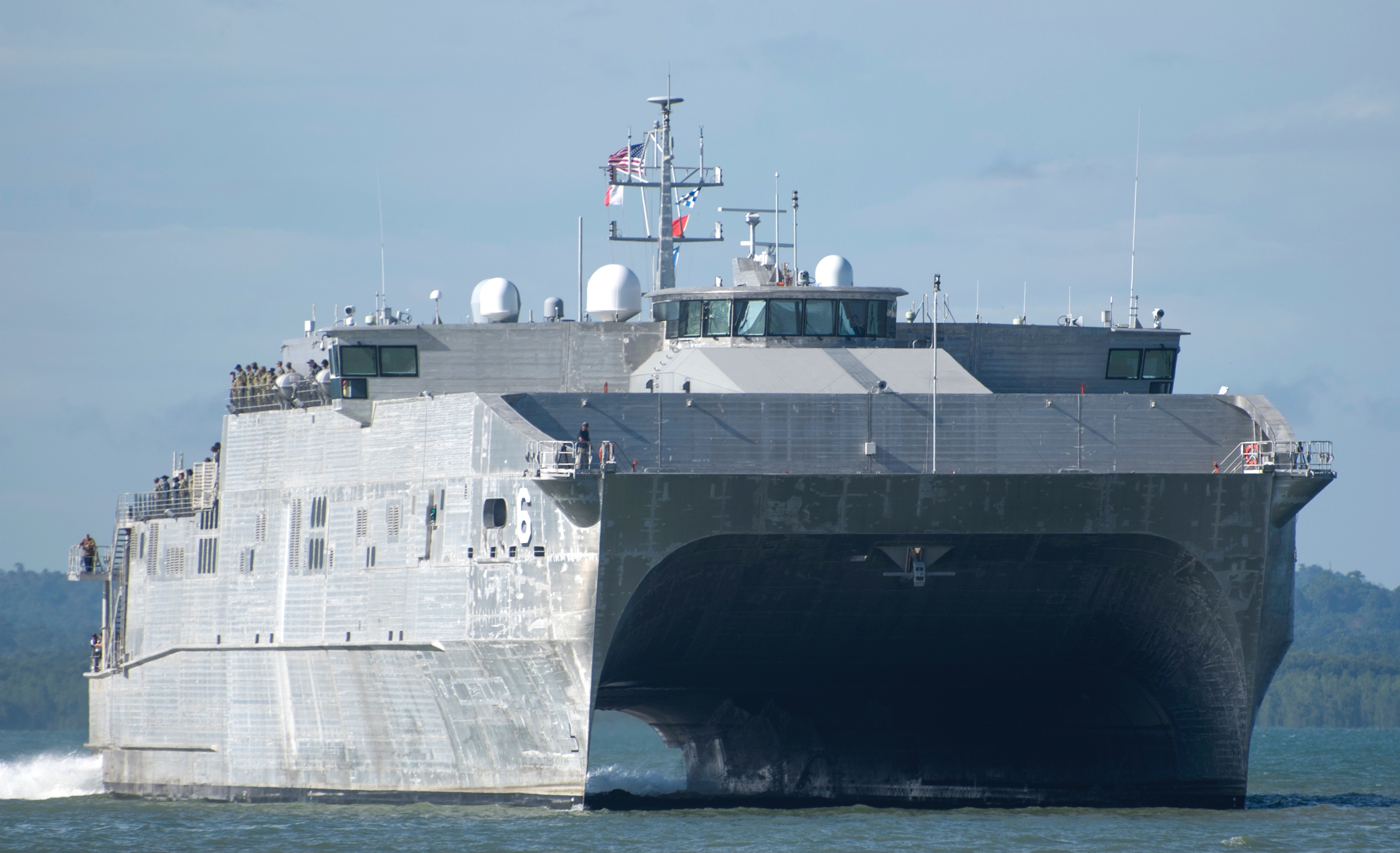
- USNS Brunswick arrives at Tawau on 21 April 2018

History

United States
- Name: Brunswick
- Namesake: Brunswick
- Operator: Military Sealift Command
- Awarded: 30 June 2011
- Builder: Austal USA
- Laid down: 2 December 2014
- Launched: 19 May 2015
- In service: 14 January 2016
- Reclassified: T-EPF-6, 2015
- Identification: IMO number: 9677545; MMSI number: 368882000; Callsign: NBWD; Hull number: JHSV-6
- Motto: Vigilance And Fortitude
- Status: Active

General characteristics
- Class & type: Spearhead class expeditionary fast transport
- Length: 103.0 m (337 ft 11 in)
- Beam: 28.5 m (93 ft 6 in)
- Draft: 3.83 m (12 ft 7 in)
- Propulsion: 4 × MTU 20V8000 M71L diesel engines; 4 × ZF 60000NR2H reduction gears
- Speed: 43 knots (80 km/h; 49 mph)
- Troops: 312
- Crew: Capacity of 41, 22 in normal service
- Aviation facilities: Landing pad for medium helicopter

USNS Brunswick (JHSV-6/T-EPF-6), is the sixth Spearhead-class expeditionary fast transport, currently in service with the United States Navy's Military Sealift Command. It is the fourth ship in naval service named after Brunswick, Georgia. Brunswick is one of three expeditionary fast transport ships in the U.S. 7th Fleet area of responsibility to continue its mission of providing rapid intra-theater transport of troops and military equipment. Like other EPFs of its class, the Brunswick is capable of carrying up to 600 short tons of equipment for distances of 1,200 nautical miles at an average speed of 35 knots (nautical miles per hour).

== Construction and career ==
Brunswick was built at Austal USA in Mobile, Alabama. It was launched on 19 May 2015. It was delivered on 14 January 2016. Brunswick arrived in Brunswick, Georgia during the Blessing of the Fleet from 6 to 8 May 2016. It allowed tours of the ship during the visit. Austal USA is also the US Navy's contractor for the Independence-variant Littoral Combat Ship which also plays a role in several major national and international Navy and Marine Corps exercises, humanitarian relief efforts and celebrations.

According to Austal USA, the catamaran hulls of the EPF are designed to be fast, flexible, and maneuverable even in shallow waters, making them ideal for transporting troops and equipment quickly within a theater of operations.

Brunswick departed Joint Expeditionary Base Little Creek-Fort Story in Virginia Beach, Virginia for her first overseas deployment in January 2017.

From 2018 to 2019 the USNS Brunswick visited places such as Guam, Yap, Thailand, and Malaysia as a part of Pacific Partnership, an annual mission focused on disaster preparedness and humanitarian assistance throughout the Pacific. In the year 2019, Pacific Partnership is the largest annual, multinational humanitarian assistance and disaster relief preparedness mission conducted in the Indo-Pacific with over 500 personnel from several Pacific countries, including Australia, Canada, Japan, Malaysia, Peru, the Philippines, South Korea, Thailand, and the United Kingdom. Alongside the USNS Fall River, the Brunswick conducted engineering projects, hosted medical events, and conducted humanitarian assistance and disaster response training. However, for Pacific Partnership 2019, US Navy leadership experimented with expeditionary fast transport ships as hosts for a medical team and serving as command ships during the exercise.

In April 2023, the ship was sent to Sudan to help evacuate US citizens from the 2023 Sudan conflict.
