= USNS Balboa =

US Navy vessel

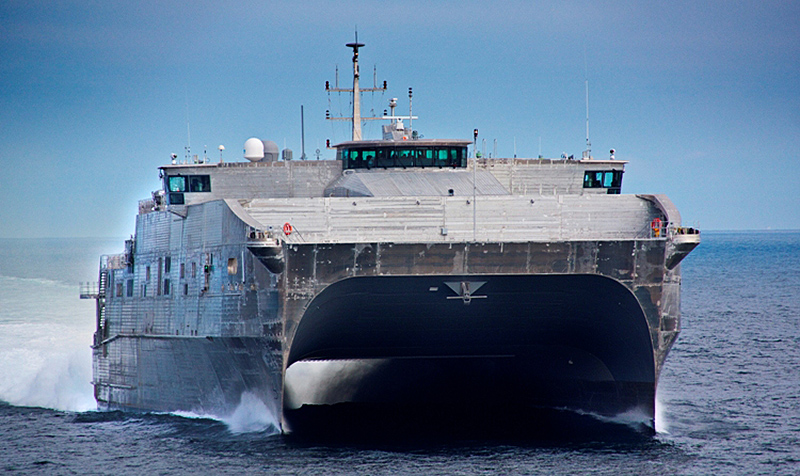
- USNS Spearhead, the lead ship of the class. Balboa will likely be marked the same as a hospital ship, with the hull and superstructure painted all white, and bearing large red crosses.

History

United States
- Name: Balboa
- Namesake: Naval Medical Center San Diego, also known informally "Balboa Naval Hospital"
- Operator: United States Navy's Military Sealift Command
- Builder: Austal USA
- Sponsored by: Deborah Paxton
- Identification: Hull number: T-EMS-2
- Status: Announced

General characteristics
- Class & type: Bethesda-class expeditionary medical ship
- Length: 118.0 m (387 ft 2 in)
- Beam: 28.5 m (93 ft 6 in)
- Draft: 4.5 m (14 ft 9 in)
- Propulsion: 4 × MTU 20V8000 M71L diesel engines; 4 × ZF 60000NR2H reduction gears
- Speed: 43 knots (80 km/h; 49 mph)
- Troops: 312
- Crew: Capacity of 41, 22 in normal service
- Aviation facilities: Landing pad for medium helicopter

USNS Balboa (T-EMS-2) will be the eighteenth overall Spearhead-class expeditionary fast transport, and second Bethesda-class expeditionary medical ship. She will be operated by the United States Navy's Military Sealift Command.

On 27 October 2023, Secretary of the Navy Carlos Del Toro announced that the ship would be named after Naval Medical Center San Diego (NMCSD), which is informally known as "Balboa Naval Hospital", to "honor the legacy and commitment of Navy doctors, nurses, corpsmen, and staff of Balboa Naval Hospital in caring for the needs of U.S. Service Members". The name dates back more than a hundred years, when a naval medical tent was first erected in the middle of San Diego's Balboa Park (on the site of the present day NMCSD), for the Panama–California Exposition in 1915. Also announced was ship sponsor Deborah Paxton, RN, MSN, wife of General John Paxton, the 33rd Assistant Commandant of the Marine Corps.

== Expeditionary Medical Ship ==
Beginning with EPF-14, the ships will be designated as EPF Flight II, with increased health services capabilities while still maintaining most of the original mission of the ship. The Flight II variant is designed to bring enhanced medical capabilities at the request of Combatant Commanders, and allows patients to recover onboard rather than in a higher-level facility. They can respond faster, and to more places than the Navy's larger, slower and unarmed hospital ships. The EPF Flight II design includes upgrades to the medical facilities for resuscitation and surgery, enhanced support of V-22 flight operations, and enhanced launch and recovery of 11-meter rigid inflatable boats.

In January 2023, the Navy announced that three Expeditionary Medical Ships (EMS) had been approved in the 2023 military budget. These will be T-EMS-1, T-EMS-2, and T-EMS-3. These are planned to be about 118m versus the earlier ships 103 metres (338 ft), and have a draft of 4.5 metres (15 ft) for operations in "austere ports". The EMS will have four operating rooms and 124 medical beds, separated into acute care, acute isolation, ICU, and ICU isolation spaces. Two 11-meter rigid-hulled inflatable boats allow for the transfer of patients from other ships or water rescue; the flight deck has room for a single V-22, or an H-53 or H-60 helicopter.
