= USS Carson City =

Two ships of the United States Navy have borne the name USS Carson City, named in honor of the city of Carson City, Nevada.

- USS Carson City (PF-50) was a Tacoma-class frigate in commission from 1944 to 1945, then transferred to the Soviet Union and Japan
- USNS Carson City (T-EPF-7) is a Spearhead-class expeditionary fast transport
