= USS Point Loma =

USS Point Loma may refer to:

- USS Point Loma, a 1957 ship transferred to the U.S. Navy in the 1970s
- USNS Point Loma, a 2024 ship operated by the U.S. Navy Military Sealift Command
