= USNS Millinocket =

Spearhead-class expeditionary fast transport

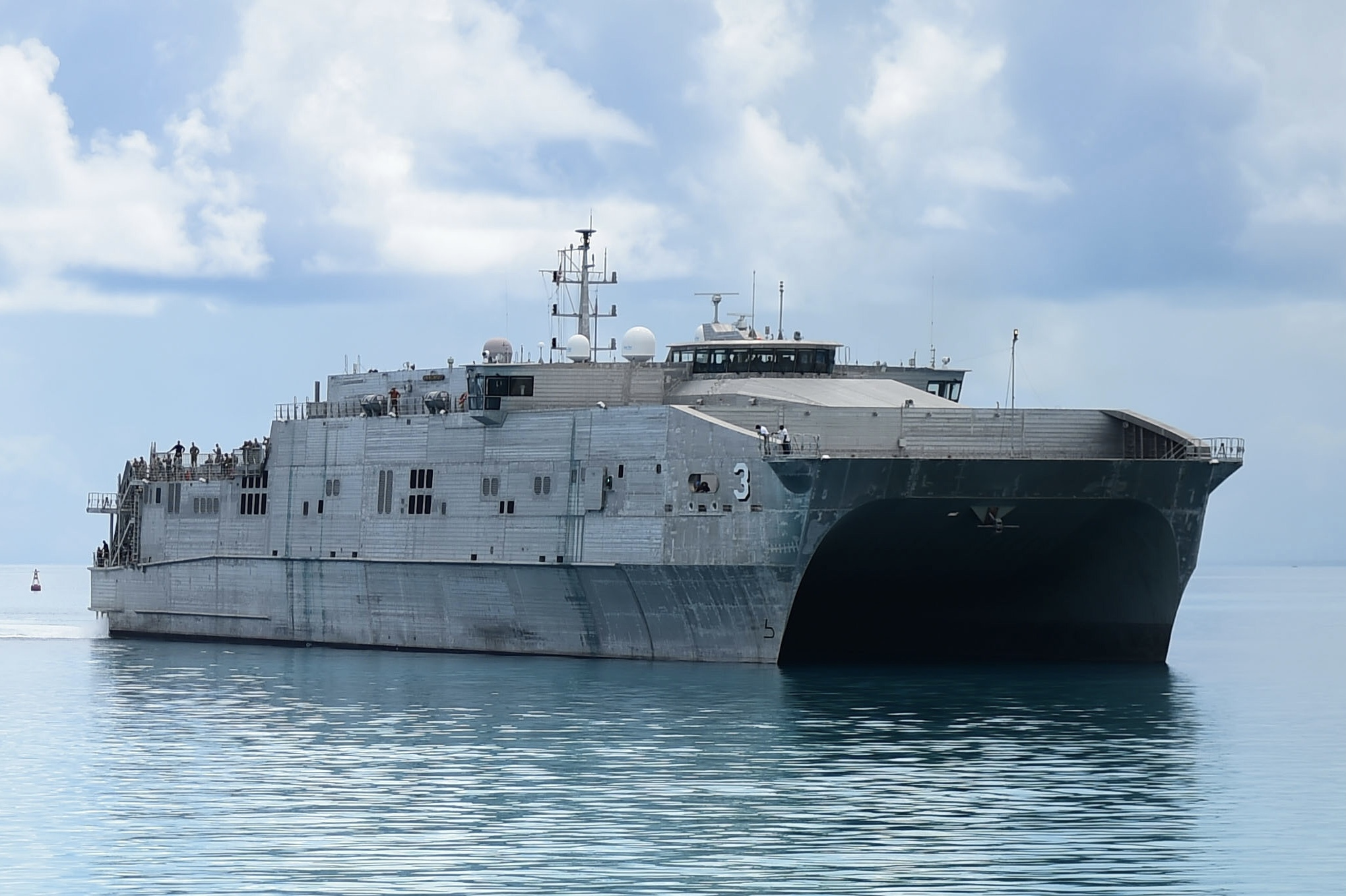
- USNS Millinocket approaching Kiribati in 2015

History

United States
- Name: Millinocket
- Namesake: Millinocket
- Operator: Military Sealift Command
- Awarded: 28 January 2010
- Builder: Austal USA
- Laid down: 3 May 2012
- Launched: 5 June 2013
- In service: 21 March 2014
- Out of service: 2 May 2025
- Renamed: from Fortitude
- Reclassified: T-EPF-3, 2015
- Stricken: 2 May 2025
- Identification: IMO number: 9677519; MMSI number: 369469000; Callsign: NNKT; Hull number: JHSV-3
- Motto: Labor, Ingenium, Perseverantia; (Work, Talent, Perseverance)
- Status: Inactive

General characteristics
- Class & type: Spearhead-class Expeditionary Fast Transport
- Length: 103.0 m (337 ft 11 in)
- Beam: 28.5 m (93 ft 6 in)
- Draft: 3.83 m (12 ft 7 in)
- Propulsion: 4 × MTU 20V8000 M71L diesel engines; 4 × ZF 60000NR2H reduction gears
- Speed: 43 knots (80 km/h; 49 mph)
- Troops: 312
- Crew: 41
- Aircraft carried: Medium helicopter
- Aviation facilities: Helipad

USNS Millinocket (JHSV-3/T-EPF-3) (ex-Fortitude) is the third Spearhead-class expeditionary fast transport (EPF). It was operated by the United States Navy's Military Sealift Command and was built in Mobile, Alabama.

== Capabilities ==
The EPF can transport US Army and US Marine Corps company-sized units with their vehicles, or reconfigure to become a troop transport for an infantry battalion.

It has a flight deck for helicopter operations and a loading ramp that allows vehicles to quickly drive on and off the ship. The ramp is suitable for the types of austere piers and quay walls common in developing countries. The EPF has a shallow draft (under 15 feet (4.6 m)).

== Construction and career ==
On 30 May 2012, Secretary of the Navy Ray Mabus announced in Fall River, Massachusetts that the third Expeditionary Fast Transport, previously having been named Fortitude by the United States Army before the transfer of the EPF program to the Navy, would be named USNS Millinocket. Since the ship would be operated by the Military Sealift Command and not the United States Navy itself, it would carry the USNS designation and not USS. The ship is the second U.S. Navy vessel to be named Millinocket (after the town in Maine), the first being a freighter sunk by a U-boat in 1942.

The ship was laid down on 3 May 2012 and launched on 5 June 2013 by Austal USA. She was commissioned on 21 March 2014.

In 2016 Millinocket was scheduled to transport items to test with Fort Worth the LCS expeditionary maintenance capability. On 2 May 2025 Millinocket was stricken from the Naval Register.. On 19 July 2025, it joined the Suisun Bay Reserve Fleet, or "mothball fleet", administered by the United States Maritime Administration at Suisun Bay, California.
