= USNS Choctaw County =

Spearhead-class expeditionary fast transport

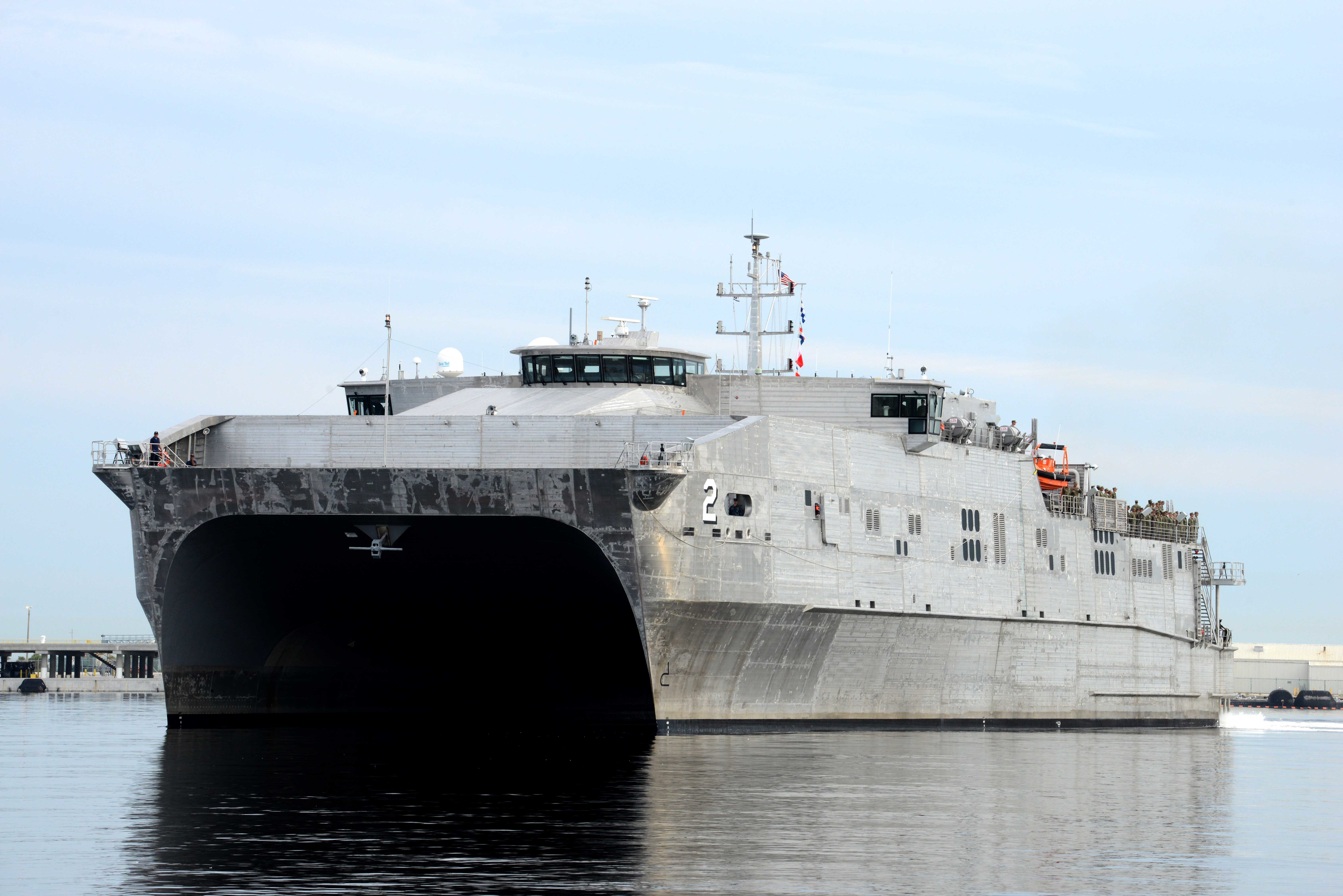
- USNS Choctaw County in Mayport on 7 October 2014

History

United States
- Name: USNS Choctaw County
- Namesake: Choctaw County, Alabama; Choctaw County, Mississippi; Choctaw County, Oklahoma
- Operator: Military Sealift Command
- Awarded: 28 January 2010
- Builder: Austal USA
- Laid down: 8 November 2011
- Launched: 1 October 2012
- In service: 6 June 2013
- Out of service: 7 July 2025
- Renamed: from Vigilant
- Reclassified: T-EPF-2, 2015
- Stricken: 7 July 2025
- Identification: Callsign: NCHC; Hull number: JHSV-2
- Motto: Harvet Peace, Prepare For War
- Status: Scrapped

General characteristics
- Class & type: Spearhead-class expeditionary fast transport
- Length: 103.0 m (337 ft 11 in)
- Beam: 28.5 m (93 ft 6 in)
- Draft: 3.83 m (12 ft 7 in)
- Propulsion: 4 × MTU 20V8000 M71L diesel engines; 4 × ZF 60000NR2H reduction gears
- Speed: 43 knots (80 km/h; 49 mph)
- Troops: 312
- Crew: 41
- Aircraft carried: Medium helicopter
- Aviation facilities: Helipad

USNS Choctaw County (JHSV-2/T-EPF-2), (ex-Vigilant) was the second Spearhead-class expeditionary fast transport,. She was operated by the United States Navy's Military Sealift Command and was built by Austal USA at their yard in Mobile, Alabama.

== Capabilities ==
The Spearhead EPFs can transport US Army and US Marine Corps company-sized units with their vehicles, or reconfigure to become a troop transport for an infantry battalion.

They are equipped with a flight deck for helicopter operations and a folding ramp on the starboard side at the stern for quick loading of vehicles. The ramp is suitable for the types of austere piers and quay walls common in developing countries. EPF has a shallow draft (3.83 metres (12.6 ft)).

== Construction and career ==
On 6 October 2011, Secretary of the Navy Ray Mabus announced in Ackerman, Mississippi that the second Expeditionary Fast Transport, previously having been named Vigilant by the United States Army before the transfer of the EPF program to the Navy, would be named USNS Choctaw County. Since the ship was operated by the Military Sealift Command and not the United States Navy itself, it carried the USNS designation and not USS. The ship is named for three U.S. counties, located in Alabama, Mississippi, and Oklahoma, all three of which are named for the Choctaw tribe of American Indians.

The ship was laid down on 8 November 2011 and launched on 01 October 2012 by Austal USA. She was commissioned on 6 June 2013. On 7 July 2025 Choctaw County was stricken from the Naval Vessel Register and marked as "transferred to the Maritime Administration in preparation for disposal." The ship was filmed under tow on the Delaware River on 6 September 2025 and was placed in the James River Reserve Fleet.
