= USNS Trenton =

Spearhead-class expeditionary fast transport

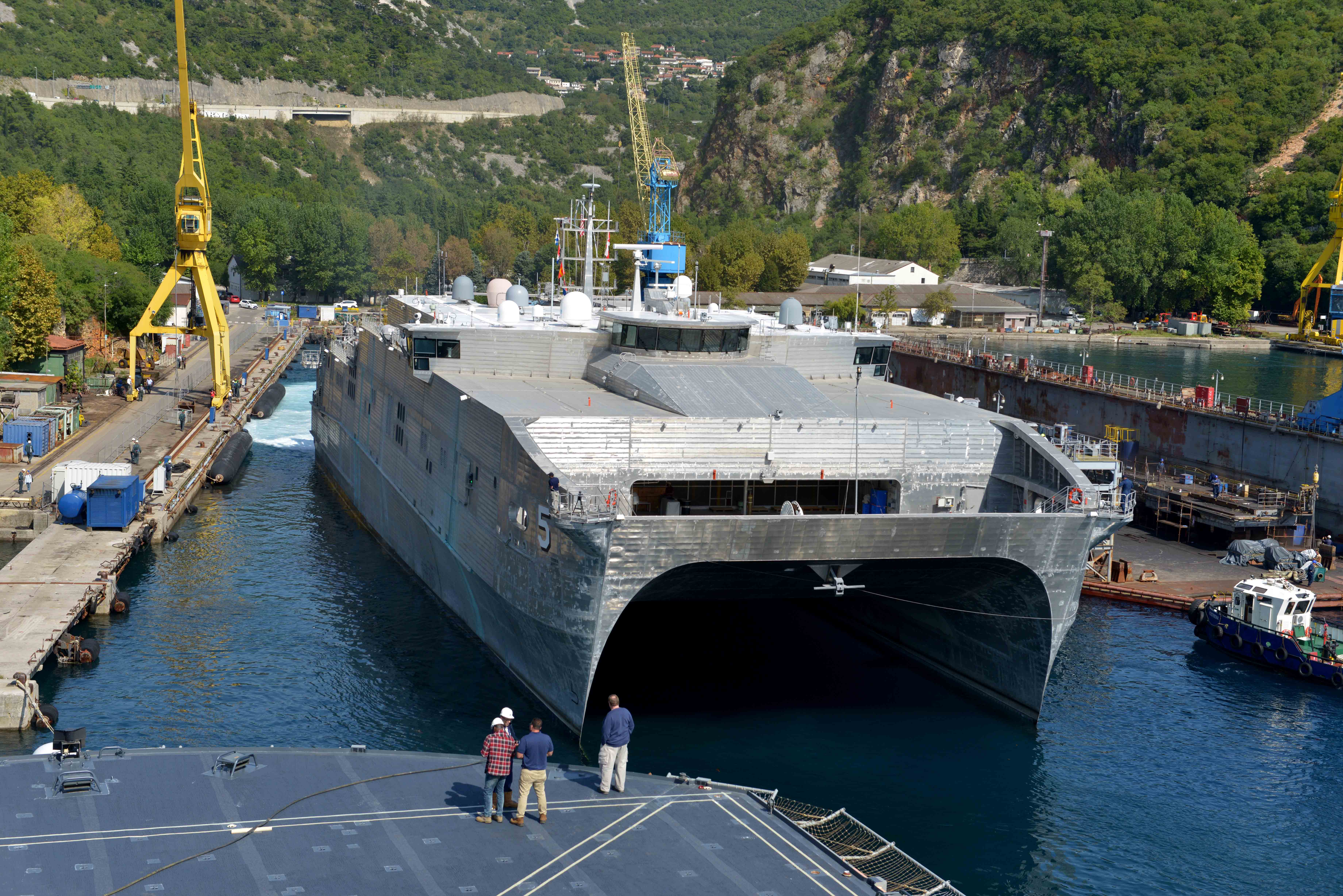
- USNS Trenton in Rijeka on 13 September 2017

History

United States
- Name: Trenton
- Namesake: Trenton, New Jersey
- Operator: Military Sealift Command
- Builder: Austal USA
- Laid down: 10 March 2014
- Launched: 30 September 2014
- Christened: 10 January 2015
- In service: 13 April 2015
- Renamed: from Resolute
- Reclassified: T-EPF-5, 2015
- Identification: IMO number: 9677533; MMSI number: 368881000; Callsign: NTRT; Hull number: JHSV-5
- Motto: Responsive, Resourceful, Ready
- Status: Active

General characteristics
- Class & type: Spearhead-class expeditionary fast transport
- Length: 103.0 m (337 ft 11 in)
- Beam: 28.5 m (93 ft 6 in)
- Draft: 3.83 m (12 ft 7 in)
- Propulsion: 4 × MTU 20V8000 M71L diesel engines; 4 × ZF 60000NR2H reduction gears
- Speed: 43 knots (80 km/h; 49 mph)
- Troops: 312
- Crew: 41
- Aircraft carried: Medium helicopter

USNS Trenton (JHSV-5/T-EPF-5), (ex-Resolute) is the fifth Spearhead-class expeditionary fast transport, operated by the United States Navy's Military Sealift Command. Spearhead-class ships are used to support overseas operations, conduct humanitarian aid and disaster relief, and support special operations forces. This type of vessel also has an aviation flight deck and can operate in shallow waters.

== Construction and career ==
Trenton was christened on January 12, 2015, completed acceptance trials on 13 March 2015 and was delivered to the United States Navy on 13 April 2015.

=== June 2018 rescue ===
On 12 June 2018, Trenton rescued 40 migrants from a dinghy in the Mediterranean Sea off the coast of Libya. Twelve people died before they could be picked up. When Trenton, along with non-governmental organization (NGO) search and rescue (SAR) ships, sought a debarkation port, Trenton was initially unable to find a port willing to accept the migrants because Italy and Malta were engaged in a dispute about the acceptance of migrants. The private NGO ship Sea Watch III denied Trenton's request to transfer the migrants, fearing to share the fate of the NGO ship Aquarius, which had been turned away by Italy and Malta two days earlier on 10 June and had to travel to Spain instead.

Trenton was spotted waiting for orders off the port of Augusta, Sicily, on 15 June. The 41 individuals were finally accepted by Italy and were handed over to the Italian Coast Guard vessel Diciotti on 17 June at Lampedusa.
