= USNS Lansing =

Spearhead-class expeditionary fast transport

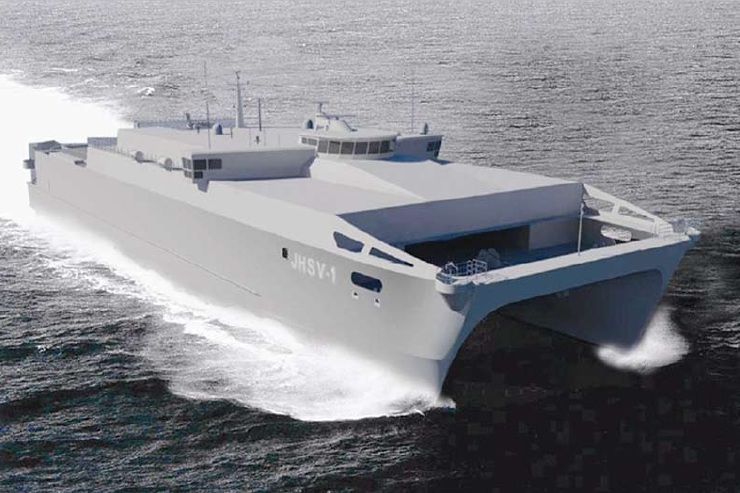
- Artist's conception of Expeditionary Fast Transport

History

United States
- Name: Lansing
- Namesake: Lansing
- Operator: Military Sealift Command
- Awarded: 3 May 2022
- Builder: Austal USA
- Laid down: 6 September 2024
- Launched: 25 February 2026
- Sponsored by: Gretchen Whitmer, Lisa McClain
- Christened: 10 January 2026
- Identification: Hull number: T-EPF-16
- Status: Under construction
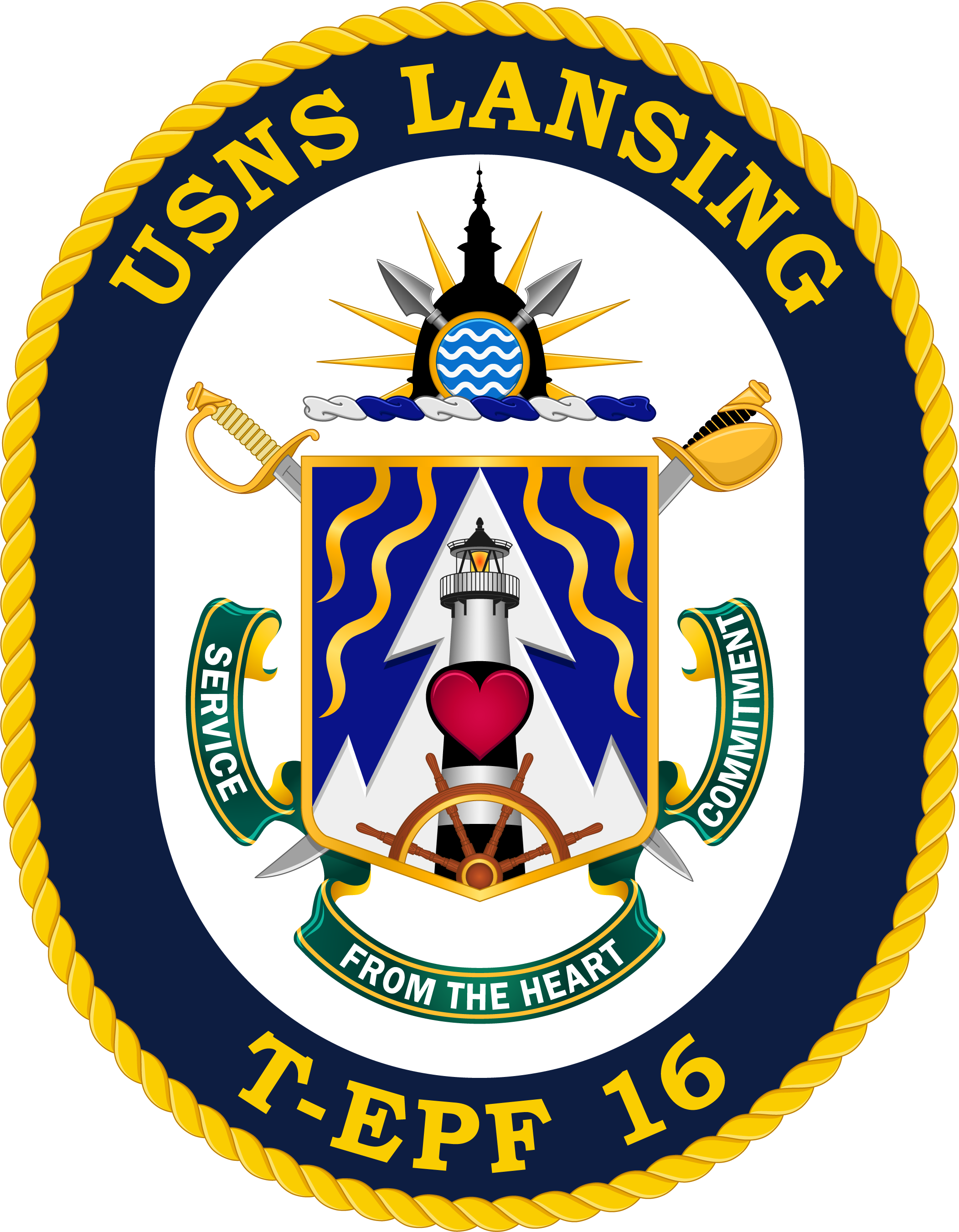
- Badge

General characteristics
- Class & type: Spearhead-class expeditionary fast transport
- Length: 103.0 m (337 ft 11 in)
- Beam: 28.5 m (93 ft 6 in)
- Draft: 3.83 m (12 ft 7 in)
- Propulsion: 4 × MTU 20V8000 M71L diesel engines; 4 × ZF 60000NR2H reduction gears
- Speed: 43 knots (80 km/h; 49 mph)
- Troops: 312
- Crew: Capacity of 41, 22 in normal service
- Aviation facilities: Landing pad for medium helicopter

USNS Lansing (T-EPF-16) will be the sixteenth Spearhead-class expeditionary fast transport, operated by the United States Navy's Military Sealift Command. On 22 July 2024, Secretary of the Navy Carlos Del Toro announced that she would be named after Lansing, Michigan. This is the second US Navy ship named Lansing, with the first being USS Lansing (DE-388), although that ship was named after Aviation Machinist Mate First Class William Henry Lansing.

Lansing is under construction in Mobile, Alabama by Austal USA.
