= USNS City of Bismarck =

Spearhead-class expeditionary fast transport

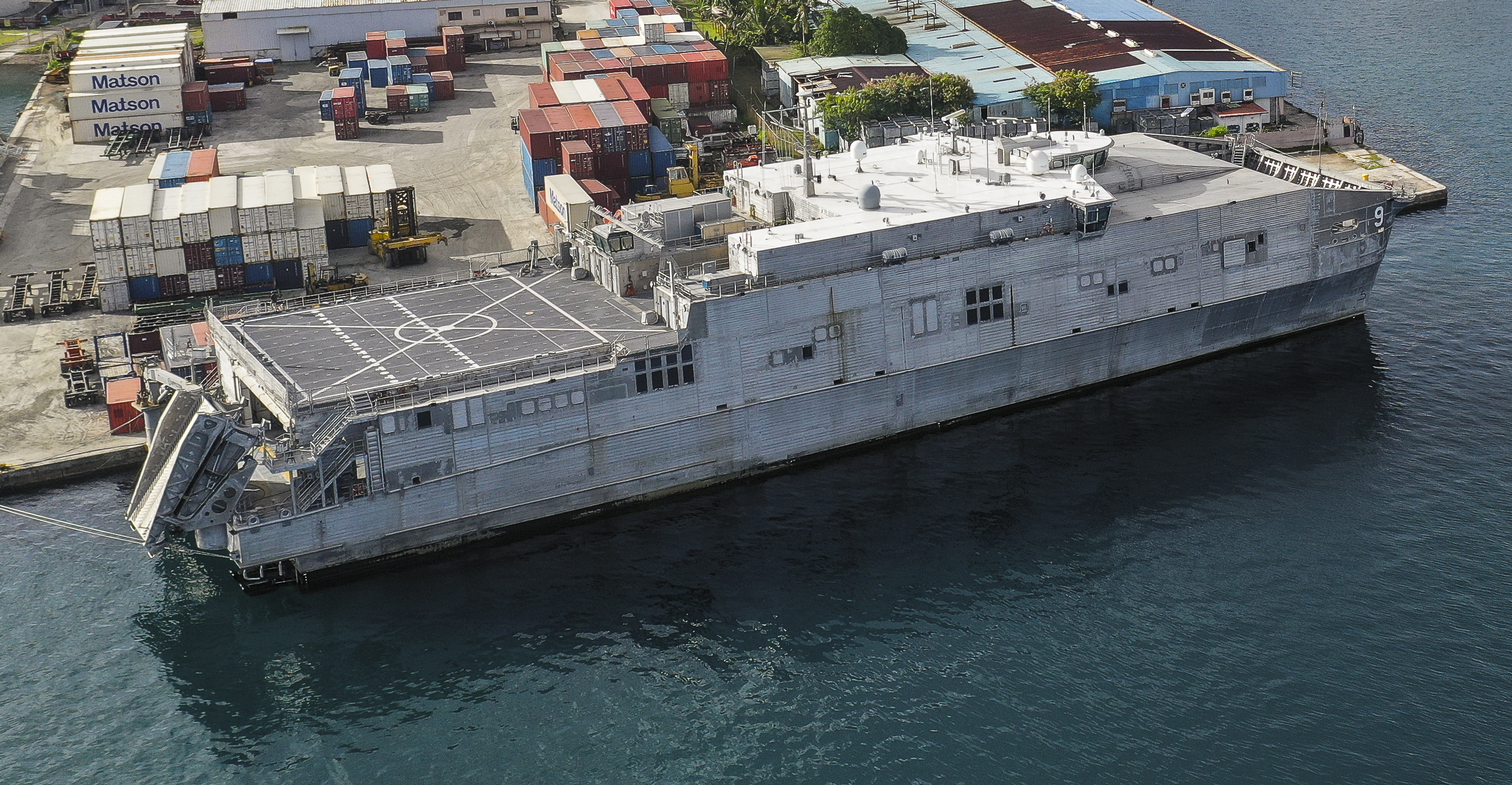
- USNS City of Bismarck in Koror City, Palau in 2021

History

United States
- Name: City of Bismarck
- Namesake: Bismarck, North Dakota
- Operator: Military Sealift Command
- Awarded: 24 February 2012
- Builder: Austal USA
- Laid down: 18 January 2017
- Launched: 7 June 2017
- Sponsored by: Jane Harman
- Christened: 13 May 2017
- In service: 19 December 2017
- Renamed: from Sacrifice
- Reclassified: T-EPF-9, 2015
- Identification: IMO number: 9677571; MMSI number: 368887000; Callsign: NBMK; Hull number: JHSV-9
- Motto: Possumus Efficiemus; (We Can Accomplish)
- Status: Active
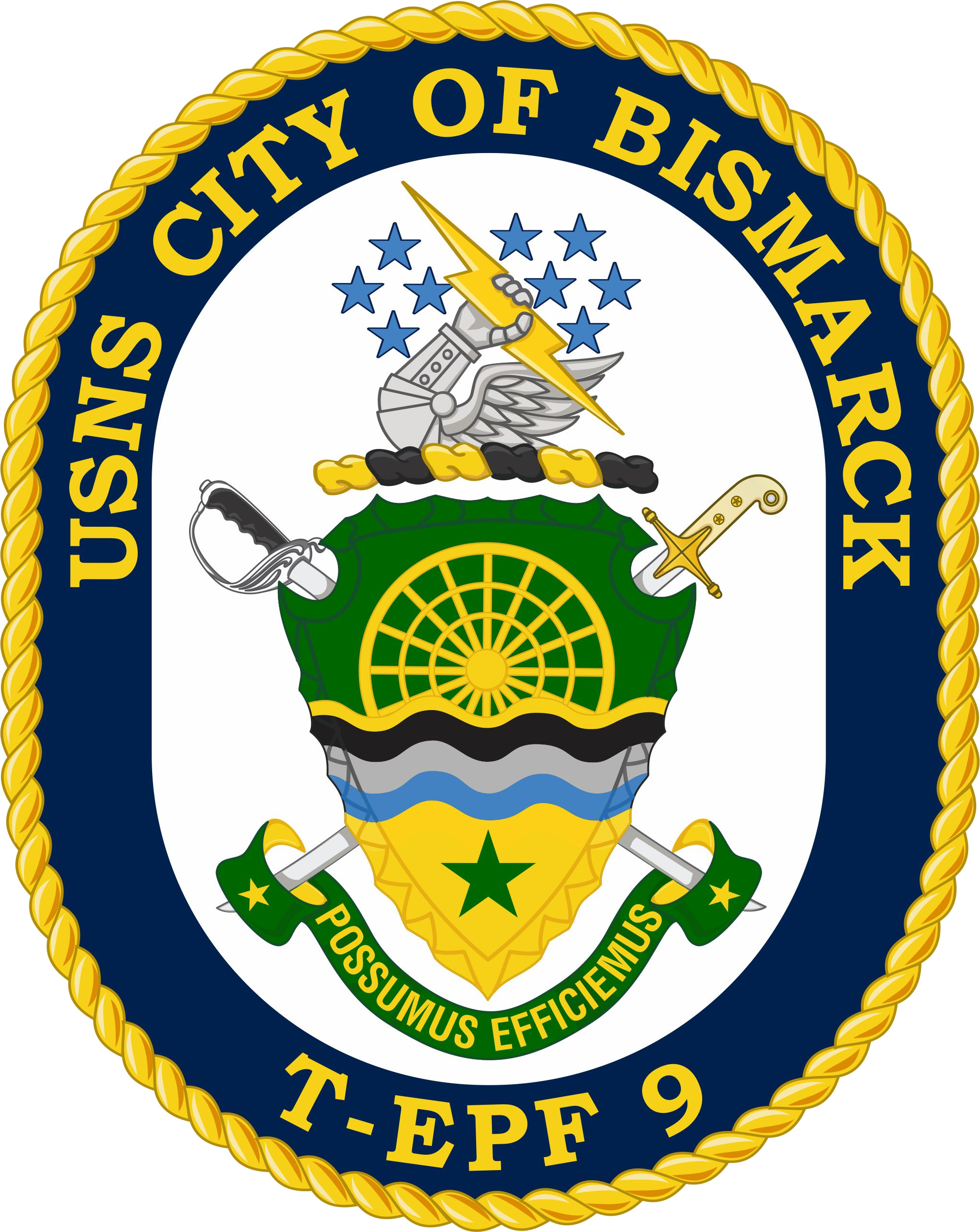
- Badge

General characteristics
- Class & type: Spearhead class expeditionary fast transport
- Length: 103.0 m (337 ft 11 in)
- Beam: 28.5 m (93 ft 6 in)
- Draft: 3.83 m (12 ft 7 in)
- Propulsion: 4 × MTU 20V8000 M71L diesel engines; 4 × ZF 60000NR2H reduction gears
- Speed: 43 knots (80 km/h; 49 mph)
- Troops: 312
- Crew: Capacity of 41, 22 in normal service
- Aviation facilities: Landing pad for medium helicopter

USS City of Bismarck (JHSV-9/T-EPF-9), (ex-Sacrifice) is the ninth Spearhead-class expeditionary fast transport and operated by the United States Navy's Military Sealift Command. It is the first ship in naval service named after Bismarck, North Dakota's capital city.

== Construction and career ==
The ship's name was announced in 2016 as Bismarck. The keel was laid on 18 January 2017, by which point the ship's name had been changed to City of Bismarck. The state of North Dakota was represented at the ceremony by Robert O. Wefald, a retired Navy officer, former state Attorney General, and longtime resident of Bismarck. Wefald welded his initials into a steel plate that would be incorporated into the ship.

On 7 June 2017, USNS City of Bismarck was launched at Austal USA in Mobile, Alabama. The City of Bismarck completed acceptance trials on 20 October 2017 and its delivery was accepted by the U.S. Navy on 19 December 2017.
