= Apalachicola (YTB-767) =

Tugboat of the United States Navy

History

United States
- Awarded: 18 January 1963
- Builder: Mobile Ship Repair
- Laid down: 1 May 1963
- Launched: 26 October 1963
- Acquired: 9 June 1964
- Stricken: 28 October 2002
- Identification: IMO number: 9093878; MMSI number: 351907000; Callsign: HO4421
- Fate: Sold 8 May 2006

General characteristics
- Class & type: Natick-class large harbor tug
- Displacement: 283 long tons (288 t) (light); 356 long tons (362 t) (full)
- Length: 109 ft (33 m)
- Beam: 31 ft (9.4 m)
- Draft: 14 ft (4.3 m)
- Propulsion: Diesel engine, single screw
- Speed: 12 knots (14 mph; 22 km/h)
- Complement: 12

Apalachicola (YTB-767) was a United States Navy Natick-class large harbor tug named for Apalachicola, Florida.

== Construction ==
The contract for Apalachicola was awarded 18 January 1963. She was laid down on 1 May 1963 at Mobile, Alabama, by Mobile Ship Repair and launched 26 October 1963.

== Operational history ==
Apalachicola began service in 1965 in the 13th Naval District. She provided harbor services to Naval and other ships in Puget Sound near Seattle. The tugboat moored during these years at Puget Sound Naval Shipyard.

During the 1990s Apalachicola served alongside Pokagon (YTB-836) and Arcata (YTB-768). Pokagon was the newest YTB class tugboat in the navy at the time. The three tugs were docked at the easternmost pier of Puget Sound Naval Shipyard, located a few hundred yards west of the Bremerton Seattle Ferry terminal.

In 1992, Apalachicola moved a crane barge from the shipyard to the Bremerton boardwalk. The barge's crane moved a bronze statue of a ship's propeller and a shipyard worker presenting a model aircraft carrier to a young boy onto the boardwalk. The bronze statue was forged in the shipyard and remains on the Bremerton boardwalk today.

Apalachicola underwent a main engine overhaul in 1993, during which time (approximately 5 months) she was not active. She is now out of service. During the time of her operation, underway movements of the tugboat required a detail of 7-8 crew members. Whereas the makeup of the crew varied, two required members for all movements were the quartermaster (who controlled the tugboat's movement) and the Chief Engineer (who was responsible for the tugboat's operating systems). For movements involving a large ship, a harbor pilot joined the crew and was transferred to the larger ship during the movement.

Stricken from the Navy Directory 28 October 2002, ex-Apalachicola was sold by Defense Reutilization and Marketing Service (DRMS) on 8 May 2006.
