= Arcata (YTB-768) =

Tugboat of the United States Navy

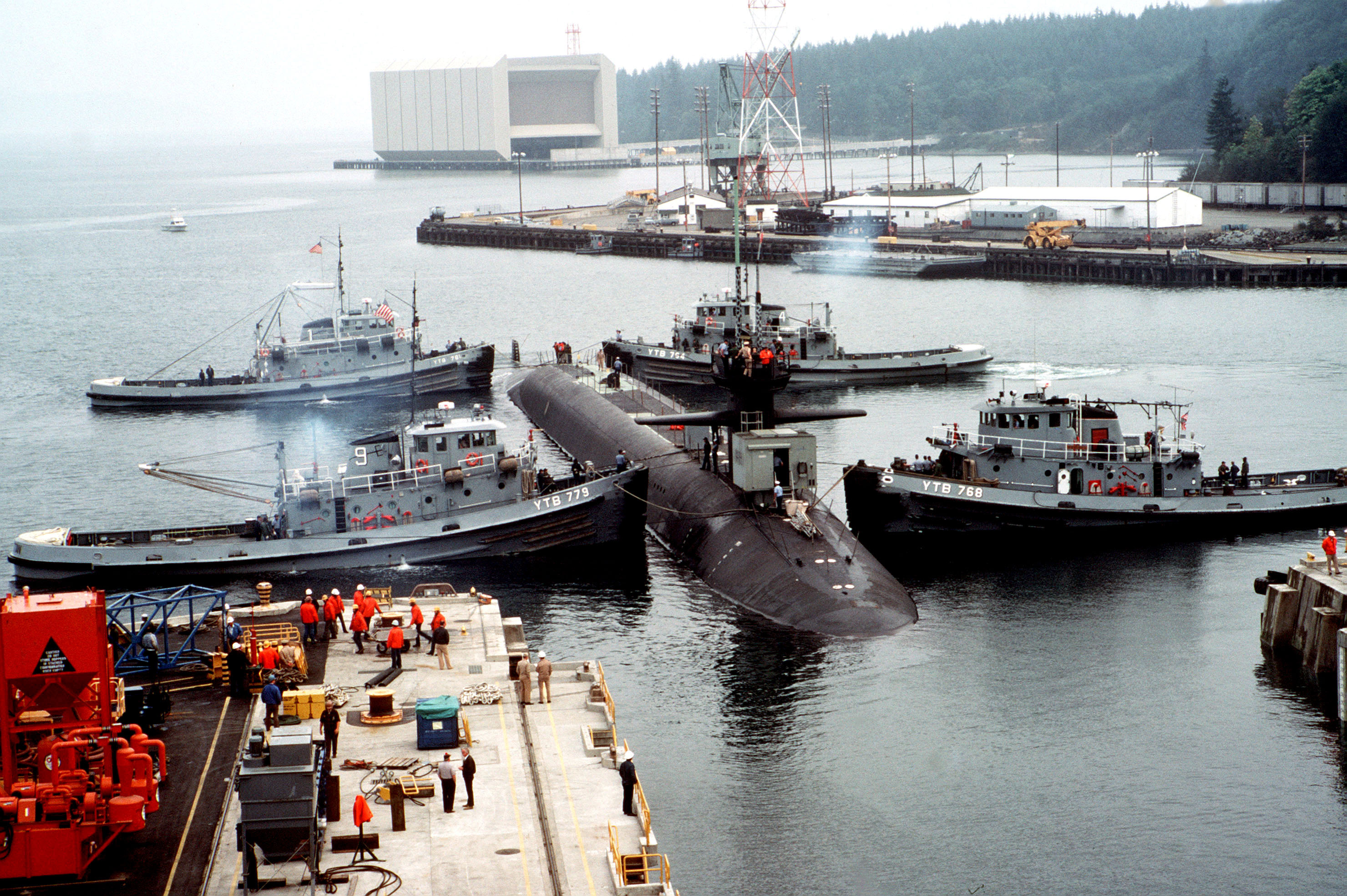
- USS Arcata (front right) and three other Natick-class tugs guide USS Ohio (SSGN-726) out of dry dock at Delta Pier.

History

United States
- Awarded: 18 January 1963
- Builder: Mobile Ship Repair, Inc, Mobile, Alabama
- Laid down: 15 May 1963
- Launched: 30 November 1963
- Completed: April 1964
- In service: March 1965
- Stricken: 4 April 2004
- Fate: Sunk as a target 2 October 2004

General characteristics
- Class & type: Natick-class large harbor tug
- Displacement: 283 long tons (288 t) (light); 356 long tons (362 t) (full)
- Length: 109 ft (33 m)
- Beam: 31 ft (9.4 m)
- Draft: 14 ft (4.3 m)
- Speed: 12 knots (14 mph; 22 km/h)
- Complement: 12
- Armament: None

Arcata (YTB-768) was a United States Navy Natick-class large harbor tug named for Arcata, California, and the third navy ship to carry the name.

== Construction ==
The contract for Arcata was awarded 18 January 1963. She was laid down on 15 May 1963 at Mobile, Alabama, by Mobile Ship Repair and launched 30 November 1963.

== Operational history ==
After completing her trials, Arcata was placed in service and, by March 1965, was permanently assigned to the 13th Naval District, based at Bremerton, Washington, to provide harbor tug services to ships in the waters of that district.

Stricken from the Navy Directory 4 April 2004, she was sunk as a target on 2 October 2004 at 33°10′12″N 120°57′6″W in 1,315 fathoms (7,890 ft; 2,405 m) of water.
