= USNS Carson City =

Spearhead-class expeditionary fast transport

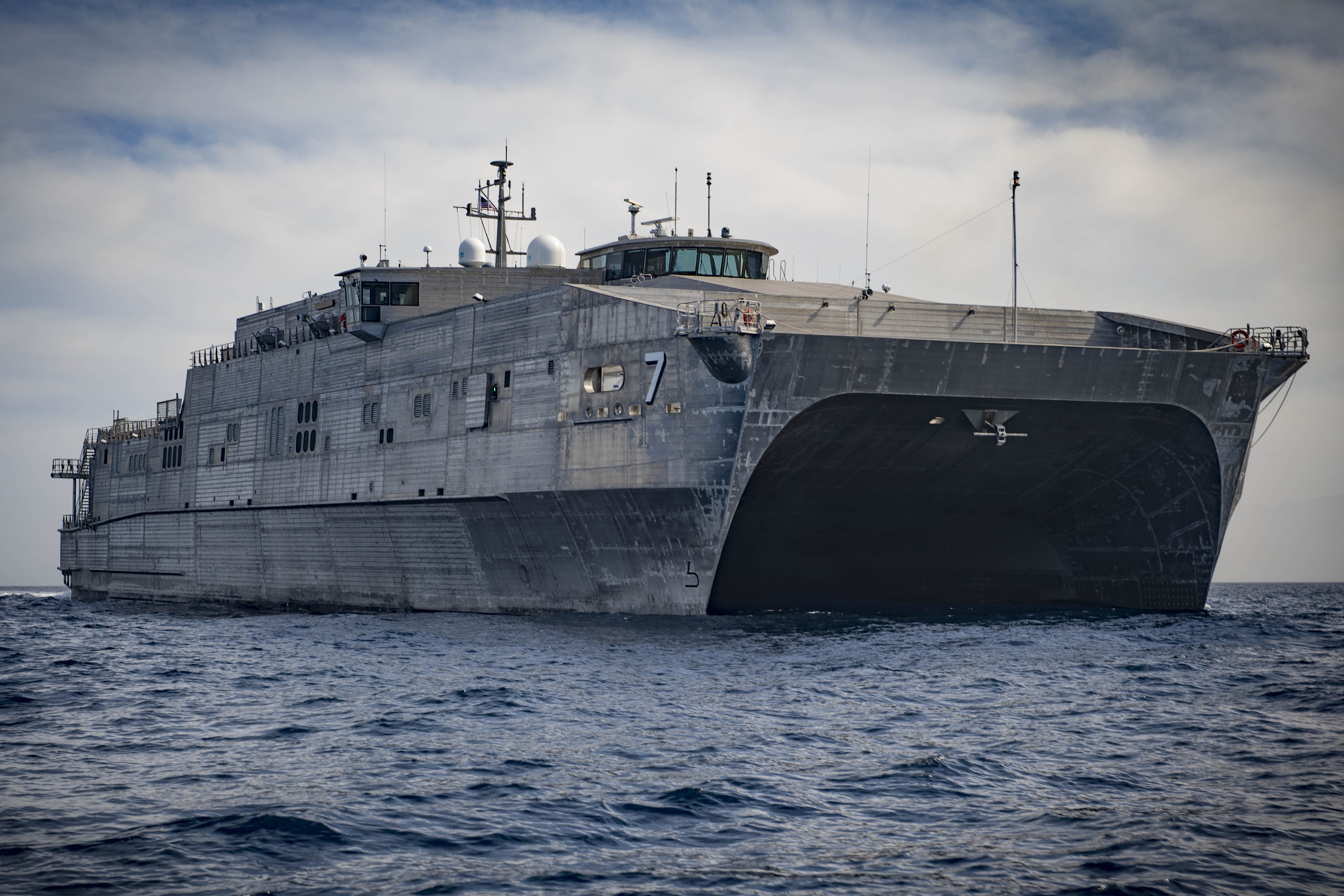
- USNS Carson City on 3 March 2018

History

United States
- Name: Carson City
- Namesake: Carson City
- Operator: Military Sealift Command
- Awarded: 30 June 2011
- Builder: Austal USA
- Laid down: 31 July 2015
- Launched: 20 January 2016
- Christened: 16 January 2016
- In service: 24 June 2016
- Renamed: from Courageous
- Reclassified: T-EPF-7, 2015
- Identification: IMO number: 9677557; MMSI number: 368885000; Callsign: NCCY; Hull number: JHSV-7
- Motto: Velux, Furorem, De Mari; (Swift, Fury, Verile)
- Status: Active

General characteristics
- Class & type: Spearhead class expeditionary fast transport
- Length: 103.0 m (337 ft 11 in)
- Beam: 28.5 m (93 ft 6 in)
- Draft: 3.83 m (12 ft 7 in)
- Propulsion: 4 × MTU 20V8000 M71L diesel engines; 4 × ZF 60000NR2H reduction gears
- Speed: 43 knots (80 km/h; 49 mph)
- Troops: 312
- Crew: Capacity of 41, 22 in normal service
- Aviation facilities: Landing pad for medium helicopter

USNS Carson City (JHSV-7/T-EPF-7), (ex-Courageous) is the seventh Spearhead-class expeditionary fast transport, currently in service with the United States Navy's Military Sealift Command. She is the second ship in naval service named after Carson City, Nevada.

Carson City was built by Austal USA in Mobile, Alabama. The ship was christened at the Austal USA shipyards in Mobile on 16 January 2016.

== Design ==
Carson City is a shallow draft aluminum catamaran with a flight deck for helicopter operations, and a loading ramp to enable vehicles to quickly drive on and off the ship. The ramp is designed to accommodate the limited piers and quay walls often encountered in developing countries. Like her sister ships, Carson City has a shallow-draft of 3.83 metres (12.6 ft) and is capable of reaching speeds up to 45 knots (83 km/h; 52 mph).

== Operational history ==
In 2018 Carson City participated in the annual BALTOPS naval exercise in the Baltic Sea. Carson City deployed REMUS 100 and 600 autonomous underwater vehicles to conduct counter-mine warfare exercises and acted as a command post; coordinating and facilitating allied movements and communications. In July and August 2019, NAVAF deployed USNS Carson City — one of an unusual and relatively recent class of logistics ships called expeditionary fast transports — to the Gulf of Guinea; Senegal, Cote d'Ivoire, Ghana, Nigeria, and Cabo Verde.

USNS Carson City became the first US Navy ship to visit Port Sudan since the founding of U.S. Africa Command on 24 February 2021.
