= Carson City and Indian Village =

Roadside amusement park in Catskill, New York

- Interactive map of Carson City and Indian Village
- Location: Catskill, New York, U.S.
- Coordinates: 42°14′29.77″N 73°58′57.39″W
- Status: Defunct
- Opened: 1958
- Closed: 1997

Carson City and Indian Village (or simply Carson City) was a road-side Wild West-themed amusement park located in Catskill, New York, approximately 2 mi (3.2 km) north of the former Catskill Game Farm on New York State Route 32. In its prime, it was one of the most popular tourist attractions in the Catskill area, along with the aforementioned Game Farm, Howe Caverns, and various resorts and camping sites.

== Attractions ==
Carson City was a recreation of a prototypical Old-West town, with a row of buildings including a US Territorial Marshall’s office, jailhouse, barbershop, etc. The largest building was the Last Chance Saloon, in which performances were given and food and drink served. On one side of the park was a more Native-American themed attraction, with rows of teepees and performances of Native American dances. At the opposite end of the park was a train depot and working train in which patrons were subjected to mock robberies along the journey. A highlight of Carson City was the daily gunfight shows, in which actors recreated famous gunfights of the Old West, such as the O.K. Corral and Coffeyville shootouts.

== History ==
Established in 1958 by Arthur Gillette, a developer of several attractions in Upstate New York, Carson City was one of nearly ten Wild West replica towns that were created in the mid- to late 1950s, and at approximately 100 acres was one of the largest. Mr. Gillette sold Carson City to David Osborn in 1979. Given the downturn in Catskill tourism in the 1990s, Carson City began to fail financially, and by 1995, Osborn filed for bankruptcy in an attempt to save the amusement park. In 1997, after running for almost 40 years, Carson City finally closed down. Several attempts were made to redevelop the land on which Carson City once stood. In 2002, the property served as the site for the Greene County Fair, an event that was discontinued two years later. In the mid-2000s, real estate owner Paul Segelman sought to develop the property for a housing complex, which was tentatively called Carson City Homes, though this idea never came to fruition and was abandoned. The property was last put up for auction in September 2009. While some of the Wild-West themed buildings remain on the property, many have been auctioned off as props.
