= USNS Cody =

Spearhead-class expeditionary fast transport

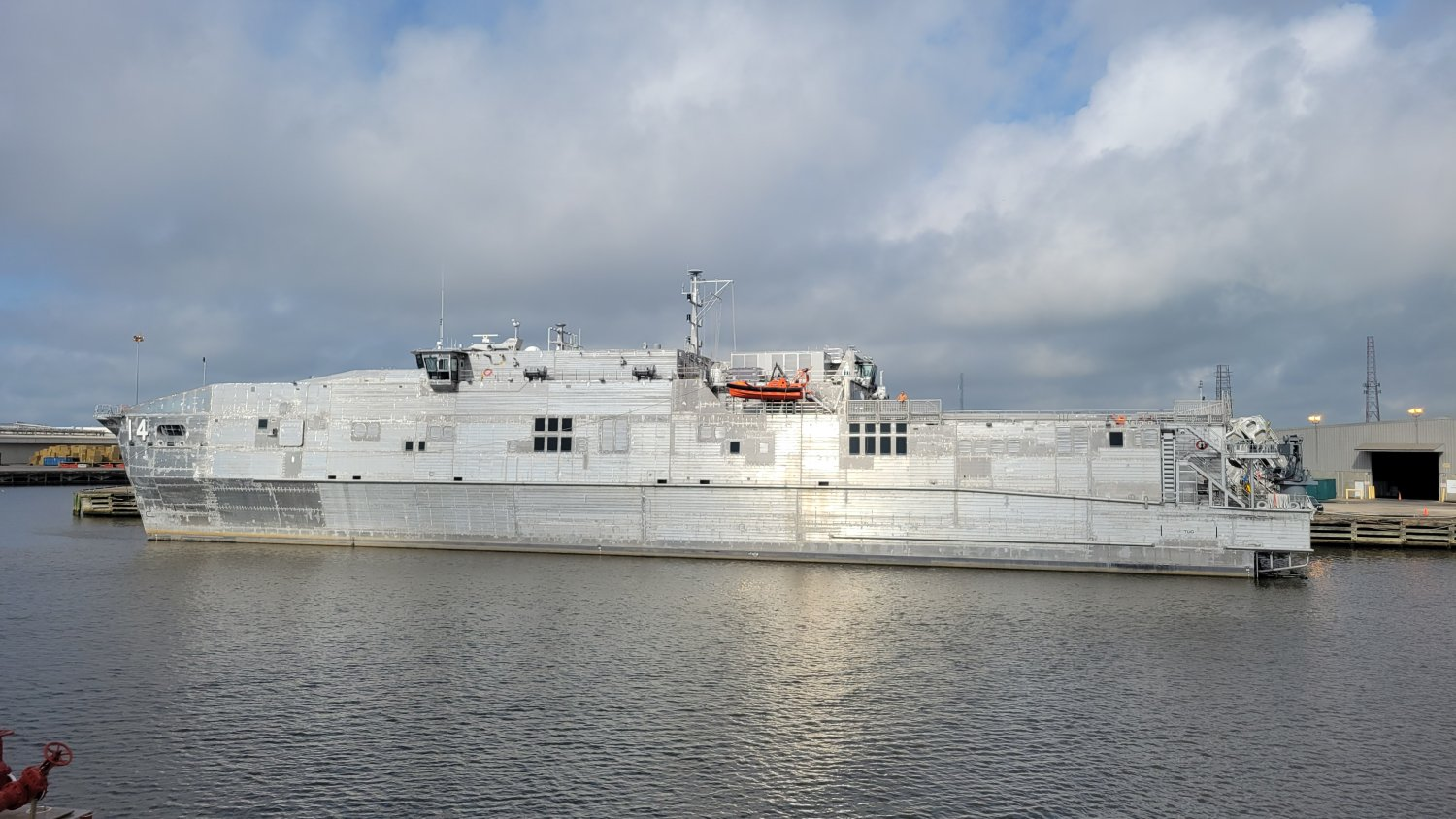
- USNS Cody moored pier side on 2 May 2024

History

United States
- Name: Cody
- Namesake: Cody
- Operator: Military Sealift Command
- Awarded: 25 March 2019
- Builder: Austal USA
- Laid down: 26 January 2022
- Launched: 20 March 2023
- Sponsored by: Averil D. Spencer
- Christened: 25 February 2023
- In service: 11 January 2024
- Identification: Hull number: T-EPF-14
- Status: Active
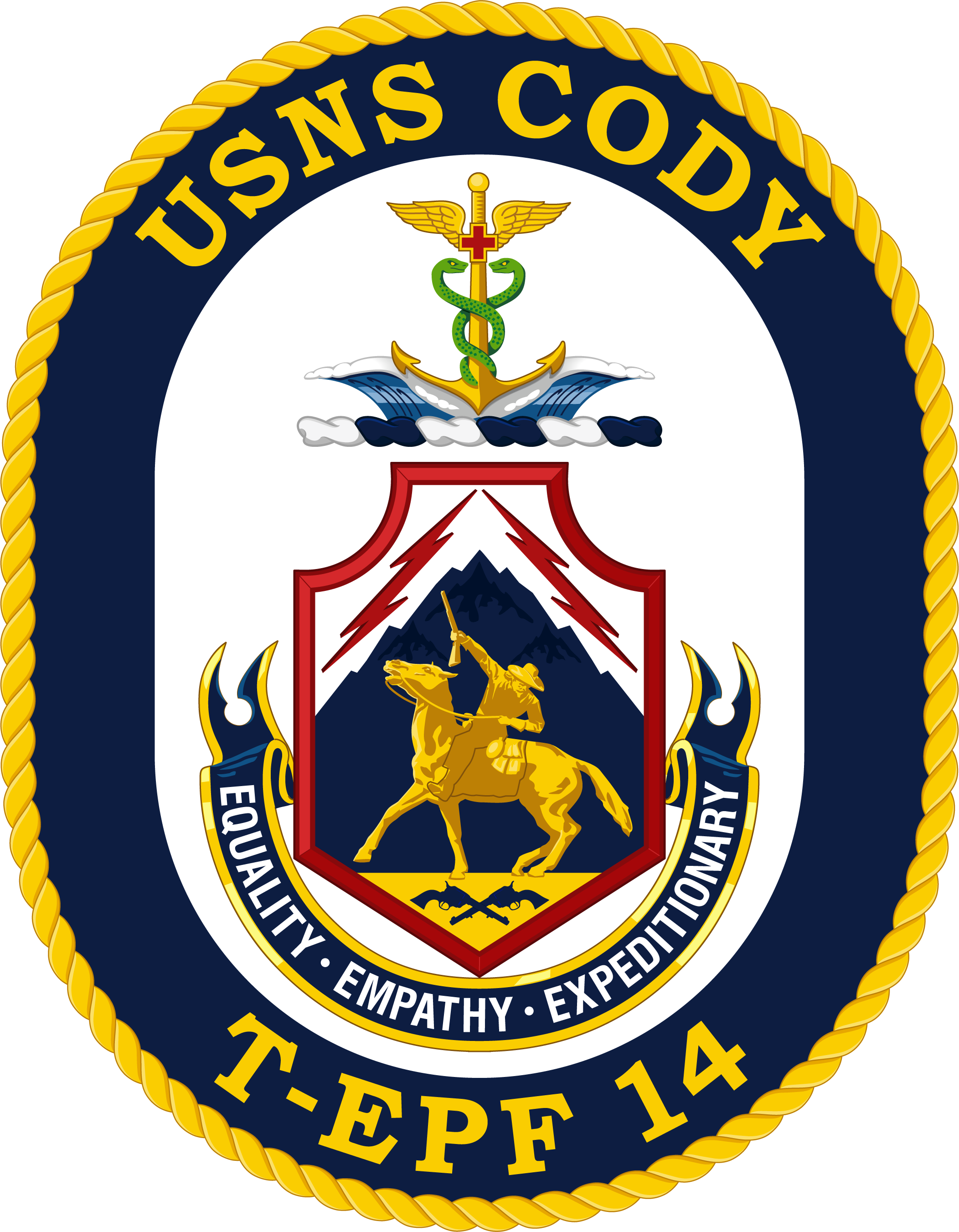
- Badge

General characteristics
- Class & type: Spearhead class expeditionary fast transport
- Length: 103.0 m (337 ft 11 in)
- Beam: 28.5 m (93 ft 6 in)
- Draft: 3.83 m (12 ft 7 in)
- Propulsion: 4 × MTU 20V8000 M71L diesel engines; 4 × ZF 60000NR2H reduction gears
- Speed: 43 knots (80 km/h; 49 mph)
- Troops: 312
- Crew: Capacity of 41, 22 in normal service
- Aviation facilities: Landing pad for medium helicopter

USNS Cody (T-EPF-14) will be the fourteenth Spearhead-class expeditionary fast transport and will be operated by the United States Navy's Military Sealift Command. She will be the first ship in naval service named after Cody, Wyoming, and the first of the Flight II variant designed to have enhanced medical capabilities.

Cody was christened on 25 February 2023 by ship's sponsor Averil D. Spencer, launched at Austal USA in Mobile, Alabama on 20 March 2023, and its delivery was accepted by the U.S. Navy on 11 January 2024.
