= USNS Apalachicola =

Spearhead-class expeditionary fast transport

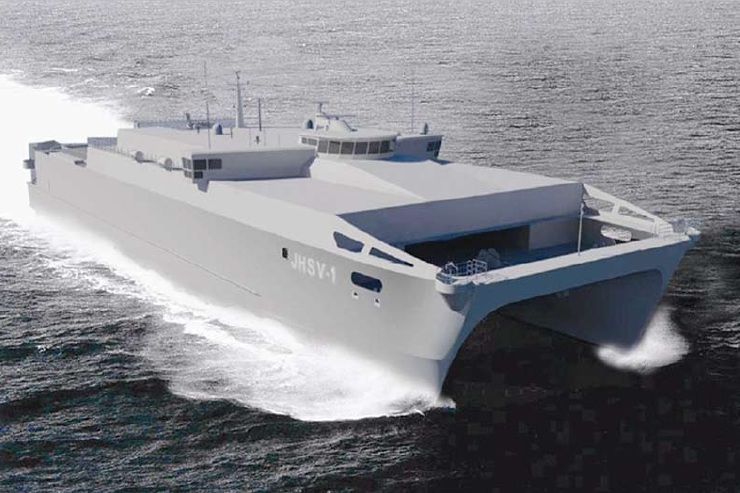
- Artist's conception of Expeditionary Fast Transport

History

United States
- Name: Apalachicola
- Namesake: Apalachicola
- Operator: Military Sealift Command
- Awarded: 25 March 2019
- Builder: Austal USA
- Laid down: 21 January 2021
- Launched: 7 November 2021
- Sponsored by: Kelly Loeffler
- Christened: 13 November 2021
- In service: 16 February 2023
- Identification: IMO number: 9888572; MMSI number: 366991412; Callsign: NACA; Hull number: T-EPF-13
- Motto: Fortune Favors the Bold
- Status: Active
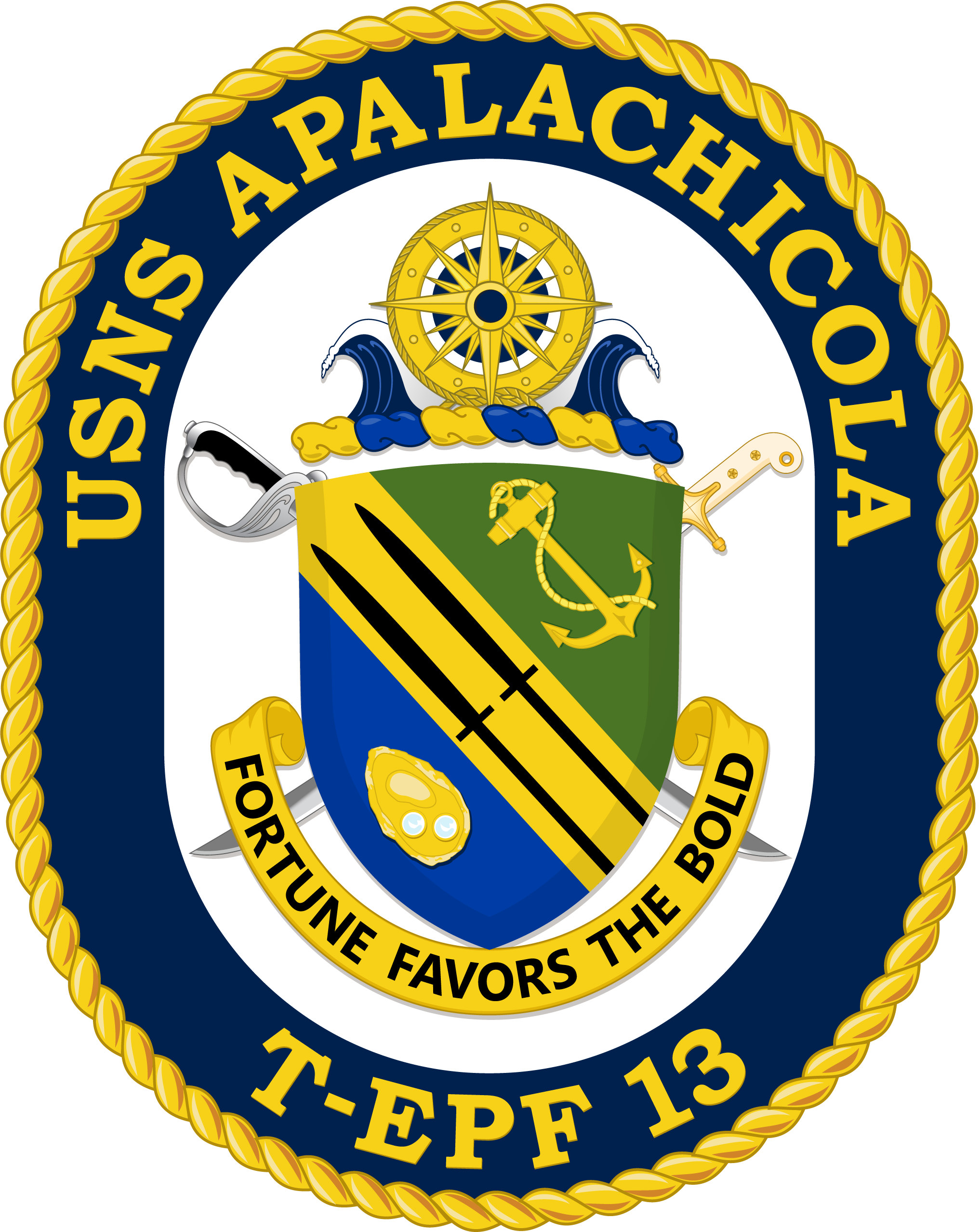
- Badge

General characteristics
- Class & type: Spearhead-class expeditionary fast transport
- Length: 103.0 m (337 ft 11 in)
- Beam: 28.5 m (93 ft 6 in)
- Draft: 3.83 m (12 ft 7 in)
- Propulsion: 4 × MTU 20V8000 M71L diesel engines; 4 × ZF 60000NR2H reduction gears
- Speed: 43 knots (80 km/h; 49 mph)
- Troops: 312
- Crew: Capacity of 41, 22 in normal service
- Aviation facilities: Landing pad for medium helicopter

USNS Apalachicola (T-EPF-13) is the thirteenth Spearhead-class expeditionary fast transport and operated by the United States Navy's Military Sealift Command. It is the second ship in naval service named after Apalachicola, Florida.

Austal USA secured a contract from the US Department of Defense to carry out the detailed design, procurement, production implementation, and demonstration of autonomous capability in Expeditionary Fast Transport (EPF) vessel 13 Apalachicola. It was commissioned in February 2023.
