= USNS Burlington =

Spearhead-class expeditionary fast transport

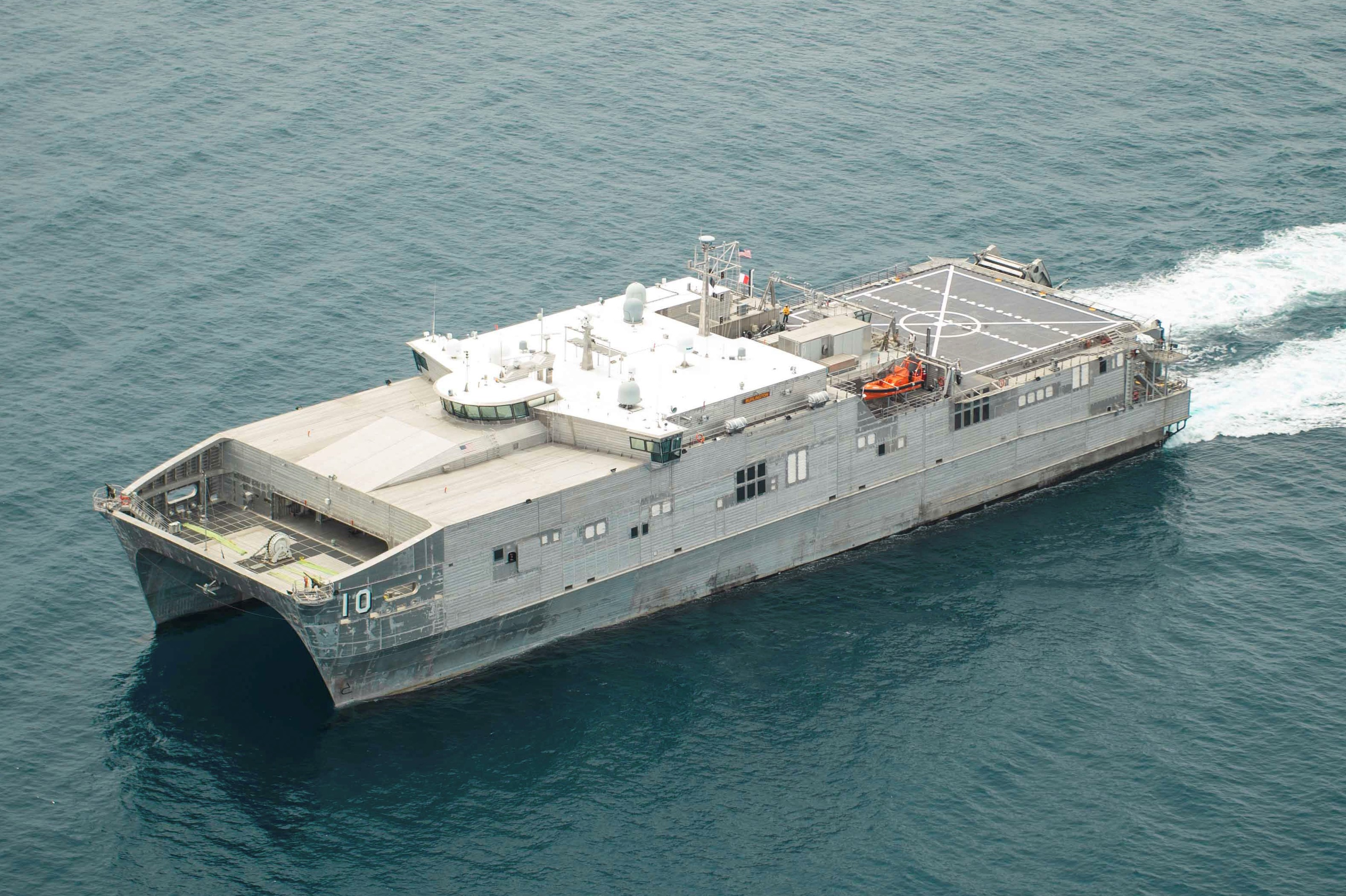
- USNS Burlington in 2021

History

United States
- Name: Burlington
- Namesake: Burlington
- Operator: Military Sealift Command
- Awarded: 20 December 2012
- Builder: Austal USA
- Laid down: 26 September 2017
- Launched: 1 March 2018
- Sponsored by: Marcelle Leahy
- Christened: 24 February 2018
- In service: 15 November 2018
- Identification: IMO number: 9757773; MMSI number: 368888000; Callsign: NBLN; Hull number: T-EPF-10
- Motto: Swift And Ready, Today and Tomorrow
- Status: In active service
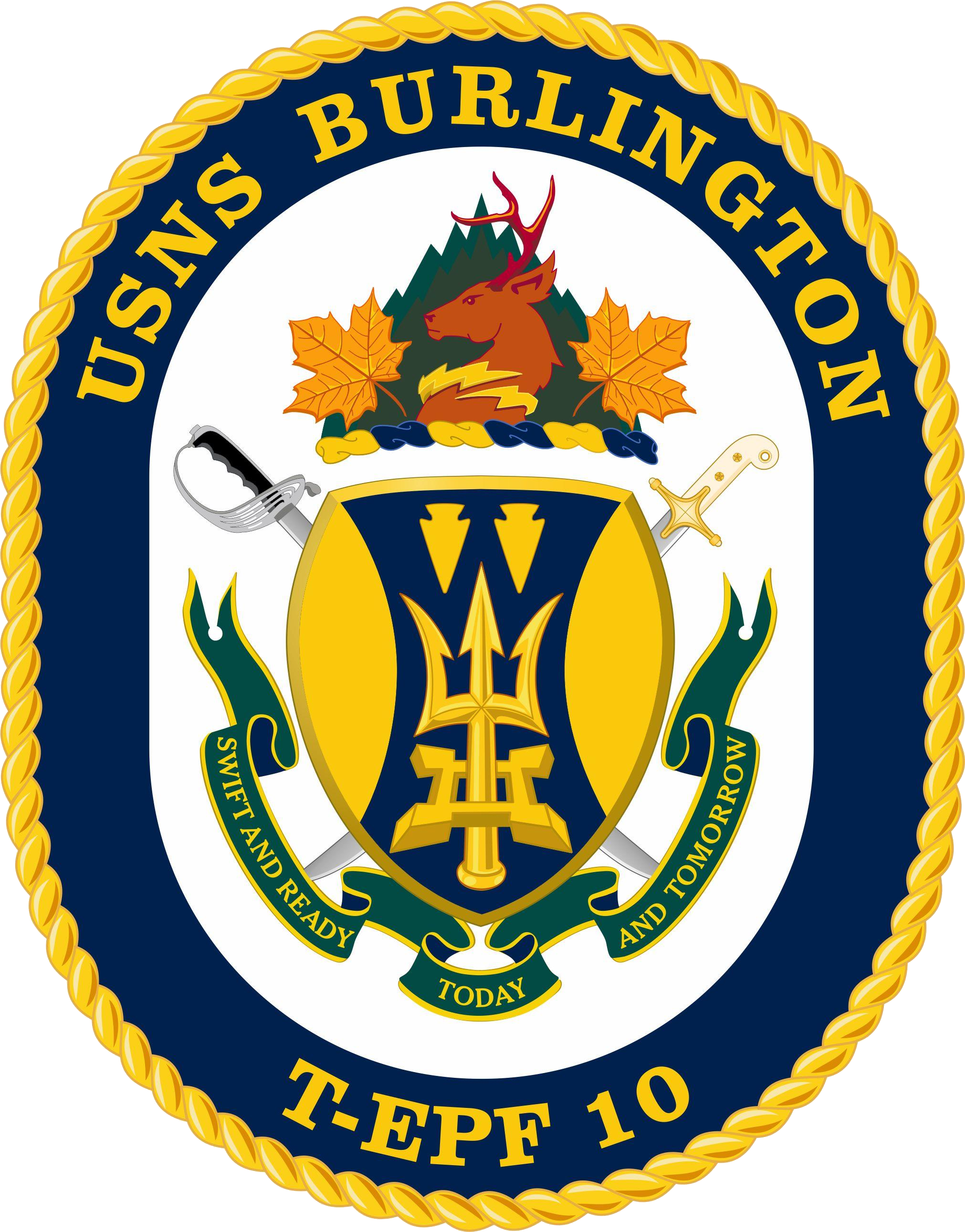
- Badge

General characteristics
- Class & type: Spearhead class expeditionary fast transport
- Length: 103.0 m (337 ft 11 in)
- Beam: 28.5 m (93 ft 6 in)
- Draft: 3.83 m (12 ft 7 in)
- Propulsion: 4 × MTU 20V8000 M71L diesel engines; 4 × ZF 60000NR2H reduction gears
- Speed: 43 knots (80 km/h; 49 mph)
- Troops: 312
- Crew: Capacity of 41, 22 in normal service
- Aviation facilities: Helipad

USNS Burlington (T-EPF-10) is the tenth Spearhead-class expeditionary fast transport and operated by the United States Navy's Military Sealift Command. It is the first ship in naval service named after Burlington, Vermont's largest city.

== Construction and career ==
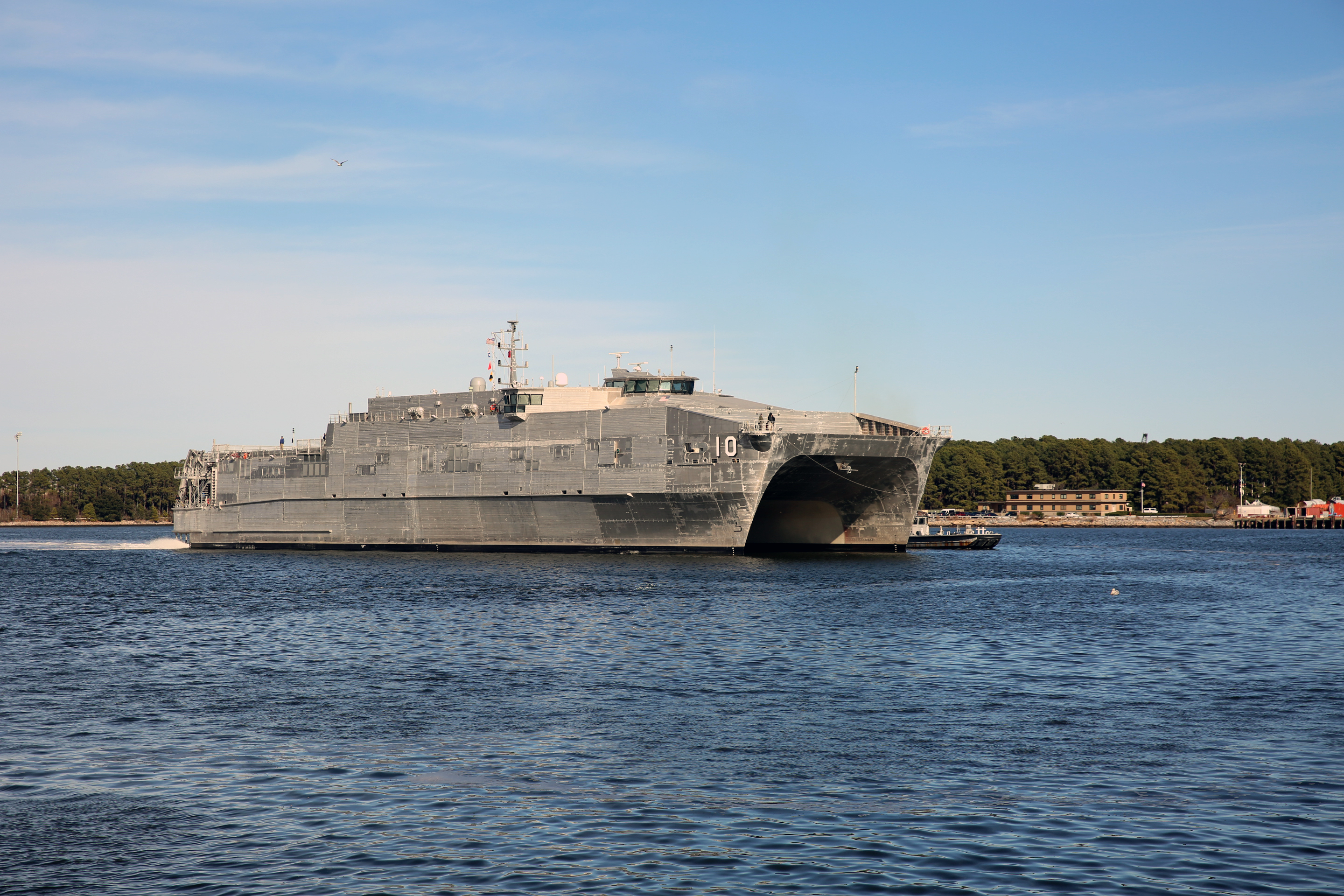
USNS Burlington pulls into Little Creek–Fort Story on 14 February 2019

Burlington was christened on 24 February 2018 by ship's sponsor Marcelle Leahy and launched at Austal USA in Mobile, Alabama on 1 March 2018. The U.S. Navy accepted delivery of Burlington on 15 November 2018.
