= USNS Point Loma =

Spearhead-class expeditionary fast transport

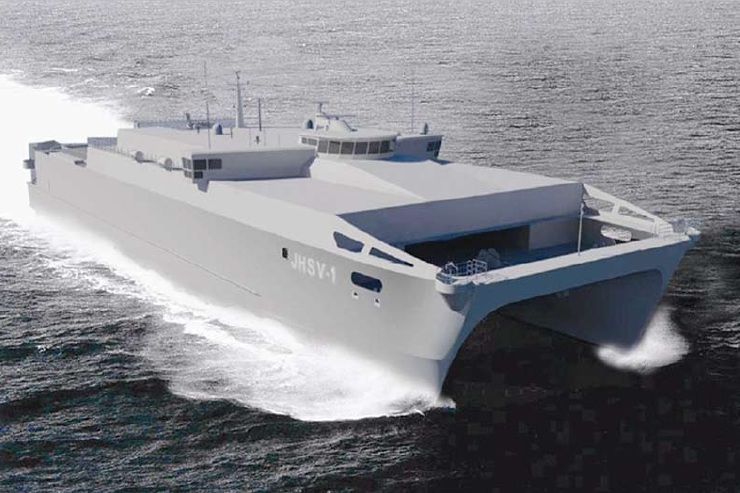
- Artist's conception of Expeditionary Fast Transport

History

United States
- Name: Point Loma
- Namesake: Point Loma
- Operator: Military Sealift Command
- Awarded: 26 February 2021
- Builder: Austal USA
- Laid down: 27 June 2023
- Launched: 3 September 2024
- Sponsored by: Elizabeth Asher
- In service: 24 June 2025
- Identification: Hull number: T-EPF-15
- Motto: Long Traditions, New Capabilities
- Status: In service
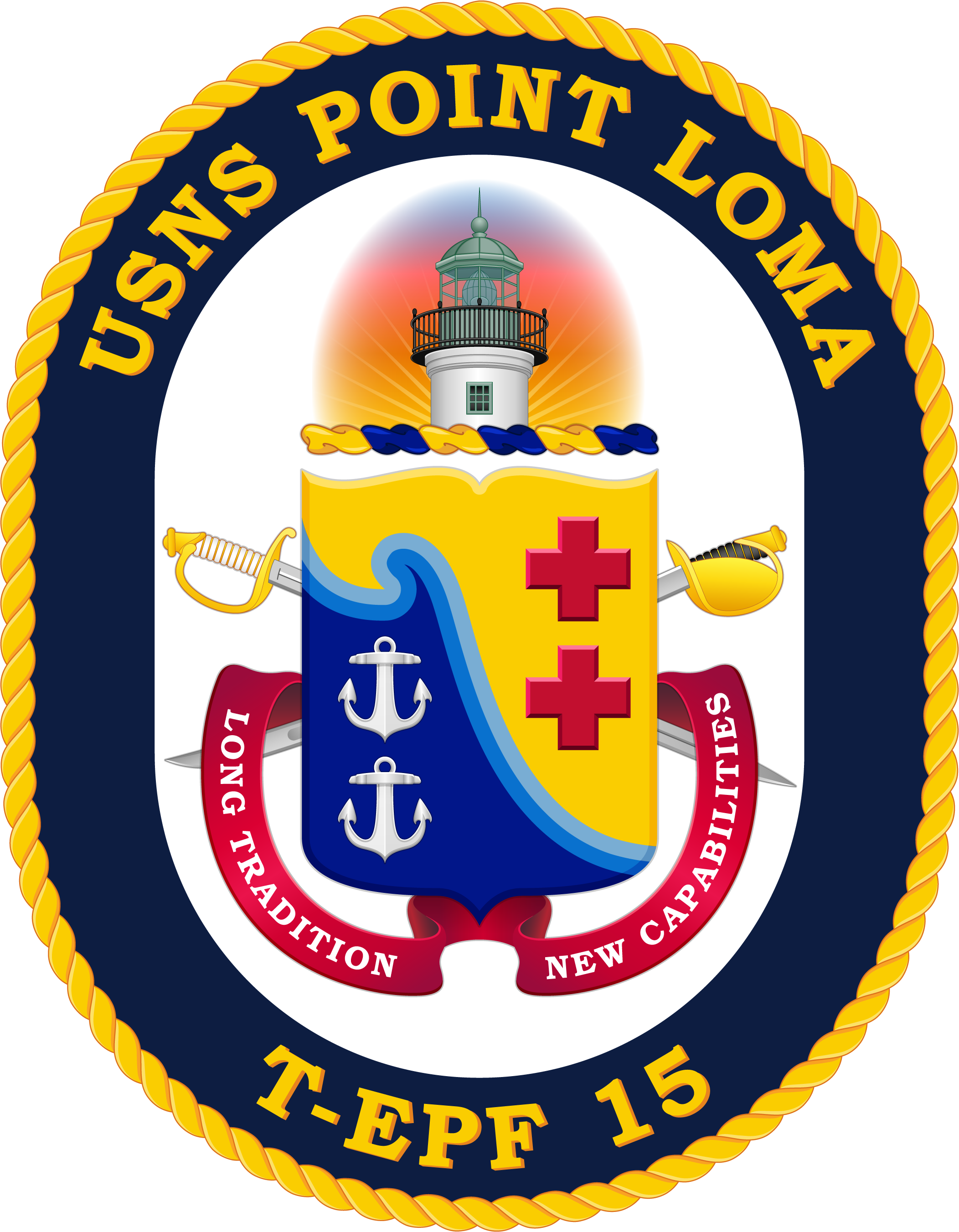
- Badge

General characteristics
- Class & type: Spearhead class expeditionary fast transport
- Length: 103.0 m (337 ft 11 in)
- Beam: 28.5 m (93 ft 6 in)
- Draft: 3.83 m (12 ft 7 in)
- Propulsion: 4 × MTU 20V8000 M71L diesel engines; 4 × ZF 60000NR2H reduction gears
- Speed: 43 knots (80 km/h; 49 mph)
- Troops: 312
- Crew: Capacity of 41, 22 in normal service
- Aviation facilities: Landing pad for medium helicopter

USNS Point Loma (T-EPF-15) is the fifteenth Spearhead-class expeditionary fast transport, operated by the United States Navy's Military Sealift Command. On 16 July 2021, acting Secretary of the Navy Thomas Harker announced that she would be named after Point Loma, San Diego. This is the second ship named after Point Loma, with the first being USS Point Loma (AGDS-2), a Deep Submergence Support Ship.

Point Loma was built in Mobile, Alabama by Austal USA. She entered service on 24 June 2025.
