= USNS Fall River =

Spearhead-class expeditionary fast transport

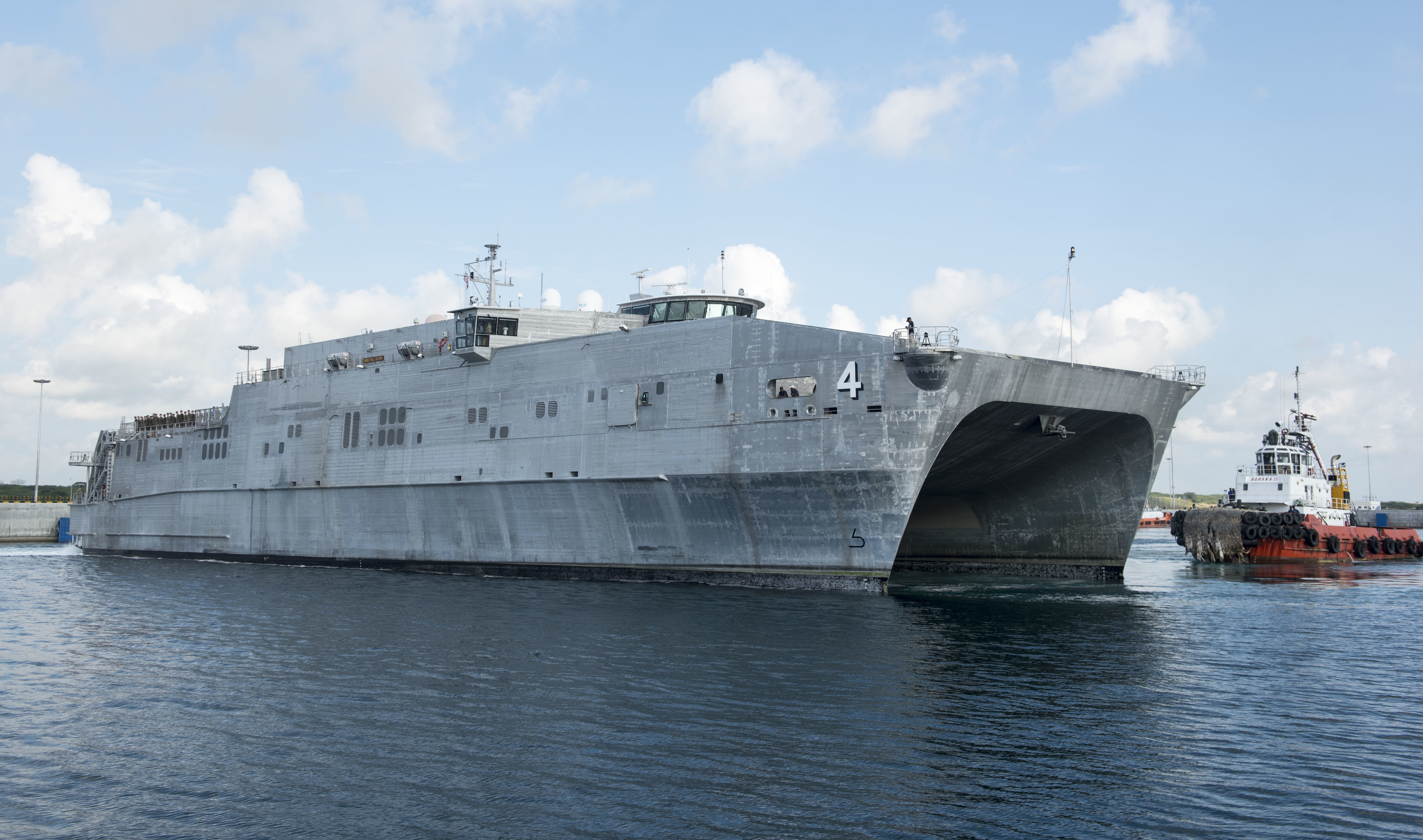
- USNS Fall River in Hambantota on 7 March 2017

History

United States
- Name: Fall River
- Namesake: Fall River
- Operator: Military Sealift Command
- Awarded: 12 October 2010
- Builder: Austal USA
- Laid down: 20 May 2013
- Launched: 16 January 2014
- Sponsored by: Diane Bemus Patrick
- Christened: 11 January 2014
- In service: 15 September 2014
- Out of service: 9 June 2025
- Reclassified: T-EPF-4, 2015
- Stricken: 9 June 2025
- Identification: IMO number: 9677521; MMSI number: 367864000; Callsign: NMIA; Hull number: JHSV-4
- Motto: Fast, Fearless, Faithful
- Status: Active

General characteristics
- Class & type: Spearhead class Expeditionary Fast Transport
- Length: 103.0 m (337 ft 11 in)
- Beam: 28.5 m (93 ft 6 in)
- Draft: 3.83 m (12 ft 7 in)
- Propulsion: 4 × MTU 20V8000 M71L diesel engines; 4 × ZF 60000NR2H reduction gears
- Speed: 43 knots (80 km/h; 49 mph)
- Troops: 312
- Crew: 41
- Aircraft carried: Medium helicopter
- Aviation facilities: Helipad

USNS Fall River (JHSV-4/T-EPF-4) is the fourth Spearhead-class expeditionary fast transport, which is operated by the United States Navy's Military Sealift Command (MSC). Fall River was built by Austal USA in Mobile, Alabama.

== Capabilities ==
The EPF will be able to transport US Army and US Marine Corps company-sized units with their vehicles, or reconfigure to become a troop transport for an infantry battalion.

It will have a flight deck for helicopter operations and a loading ramp that will allow vehicles to quickly drive on and off the ship. The ramp will be suitable for the types of austere piers and quay walls common in developing countries. EPF will have a shallow draft (under 15 feet (4.6 m)).

== Construction and career ==
On 23 March 2010, Secretary of the Navy Ray Mabus announced in Fall River, Massachusetts that the fourth Expeditionary Fast Transport will be named USNS Fall River. Because the ship will be operated by the Military Sealift Command and not the United States Navy itself, it will carry the USNS prefix instead of USS.

The ship was christened on 11 January 2014 by First Lady of Massachusetts, Diane Bemus Patrick, at Austal USA's Shipyard in Mobile, Alabama. The ship was launched seven days later on 16 January. Fall River completed acceptance trials on 25 July 2014. Following delivery and Final Contract Trials (FCT) later in the year, Fall River was accepted into MSC service on 15 September 2014. On June 9, 2025, she was stricken from the Naval Register.
