= Spearhead-class expeditionary fast transport =

US navy catamaran

Spearhead class
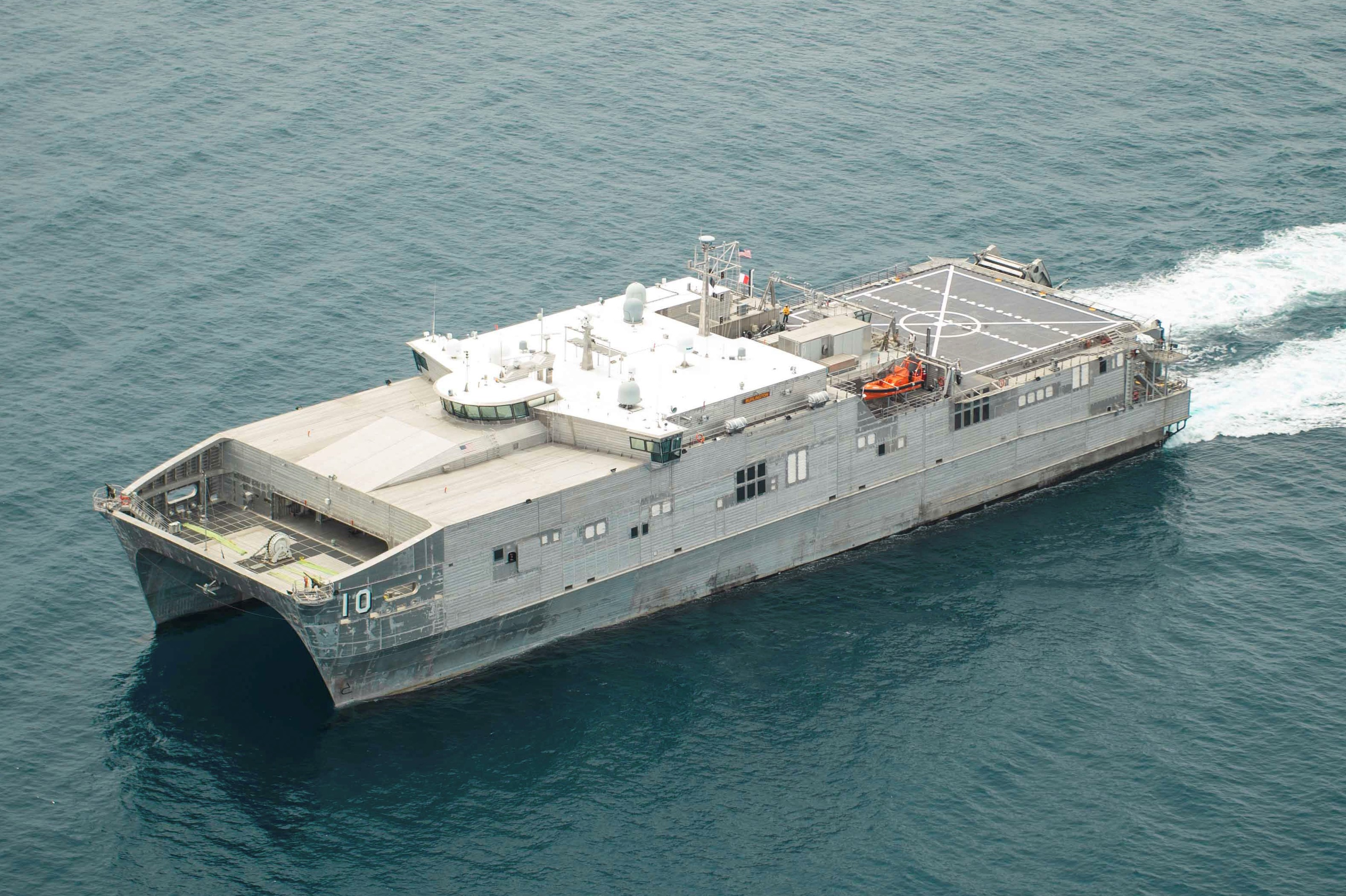
- USNS Burlington (T-EPF-10) in 2021

Class overview
- Builders: Austal USA
- Operators: United States Navy
- Cost: $214m/unit (initial); $180m/unit (production)
- Built: 2010–present
- Planned: 19
- Building: 1
- Completed: 15
- Active: 10

General characteristics
- Type: Expeditionary Fast Transport
- Tonnage: 1,515 tonnes
- Length: 103.0 m (337 ft 11 in)
- Beam: 28.5 m (93 ft 6 in)
- Draft: 3.83 m (12 ft 7 in)
- Propulsion: Four MTU 20V8000 M71L diesel engines; Four ZF 60000NR2H reduction gears
- Speed: 43 knots (80 km/h; 49 mph)
- Range: 1,200 nmi (1,400 mi; 2,200 km)
- Boats & landing craft carried: Can deploy various rigid hull inflatable boats
- Capacity: 600 short tons
- Troops: 312
- Crew: 41
- Armament: 4x mounts for M2 .50 caliber machine guns (2 aft, 2 forward)
- Aircraft carried: Landing pad for a helicopter, up to CH-53 Super Stallion/CH-53K King Stallion, parking and storage area for MH-60 Seahawk

The Spearhead-class expeditionary fast transport (EPF) is a United States Navy–led shipbuilding program to provide a high-speed, shallow draft vessel intended for rapid intra-theater transport of medium-sized cargo payloads. The EPFs can reach speeds of 35–45 knots (65–83 km/h; 40–52 mph), and allow the rapid transit and deployment of conventional or special forces, equipment and supplies.

The vessels are a part of Military Sealift Command's Sealift Program. The class was previously designated as "Joint High Speed Vessel (JHSV)", and redesignated in September 2015.

== Capabilities ==
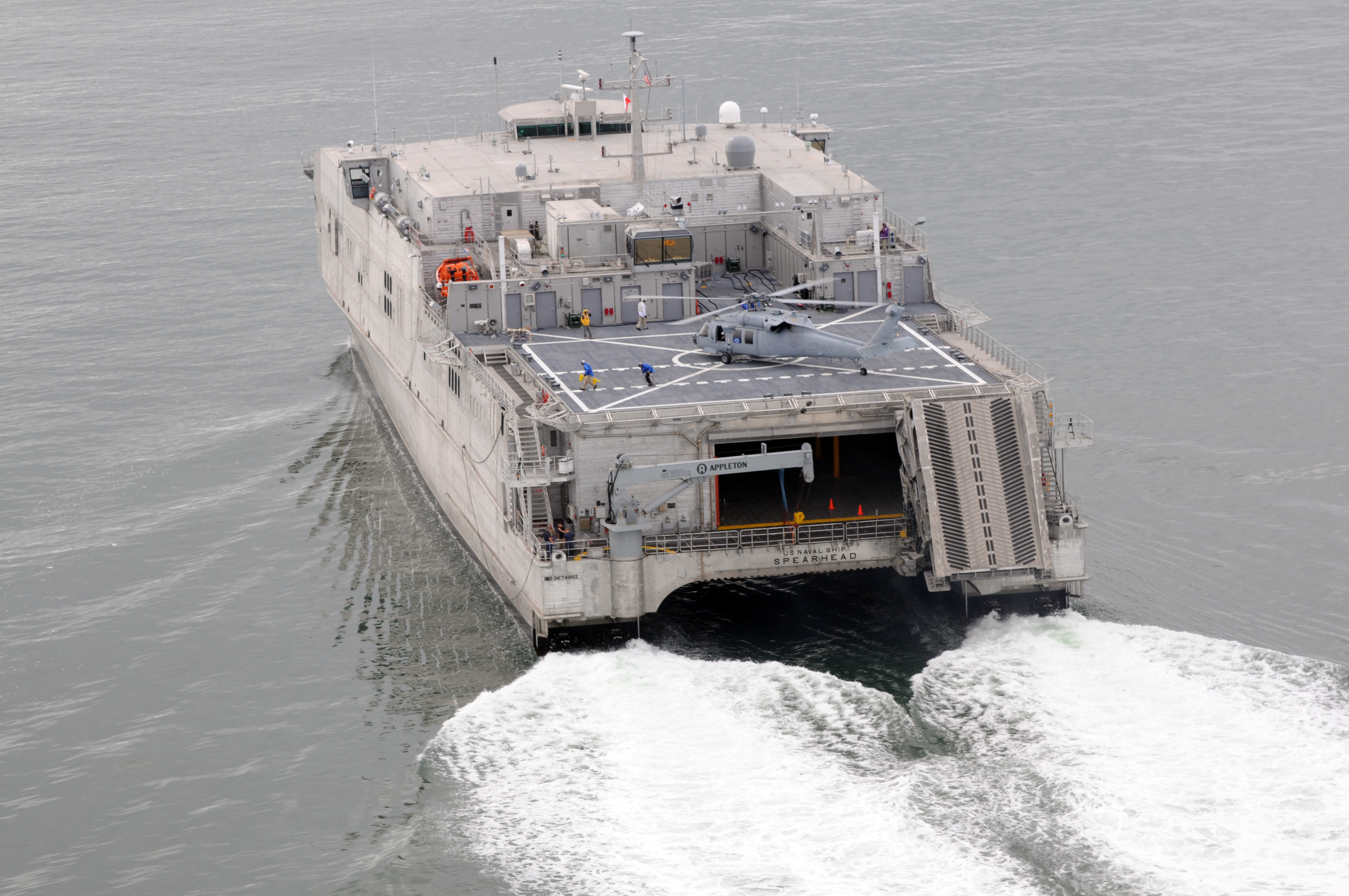
Stern view of USNS Spearhead, with helicopter

The EPF is able to transport U.S. Army and U.S. Marine Corps company-sized units with their vehicles, or can be reconfigured to become a troop transport for an infantry battalion.

The EPF has a flight deck for helicopters and a load ramp that will allow vehicles to quickly drive on and off the ship. The ramp is suitable for the types of austere piers and quay walls common in developing countries. EPF has a shallow draft (under 15 feet (4.6 m)).

The EPF is an aluminum twin-hull catamaran shell containing four diesel engines, rudimentary facilities for up to 40 crew members, and 312 airline-style passenger seats, with an expansive flight deck on the top. The rest of the vessel is a convertible 20,000 ft^{2} (1,900 m^{2}) mission bay that can be loaded to carry any cargo. Vehicles and cargo are loaded and unloaded by a ramp that can support up to 100 tons of weight. Although designed for a military crew of 46, the ships usually have a crew of 26. The passenger room contains reclining seats with overhead televisions and racks for weapons and equipment. Each vessel has 104 permanent berthing spaces. Without resupply, it can support 312 embarked personnel for four days, or 104 personnel for 14 days.

The design is a derivative of the Hawaii Superferry, also built by Austal USA.

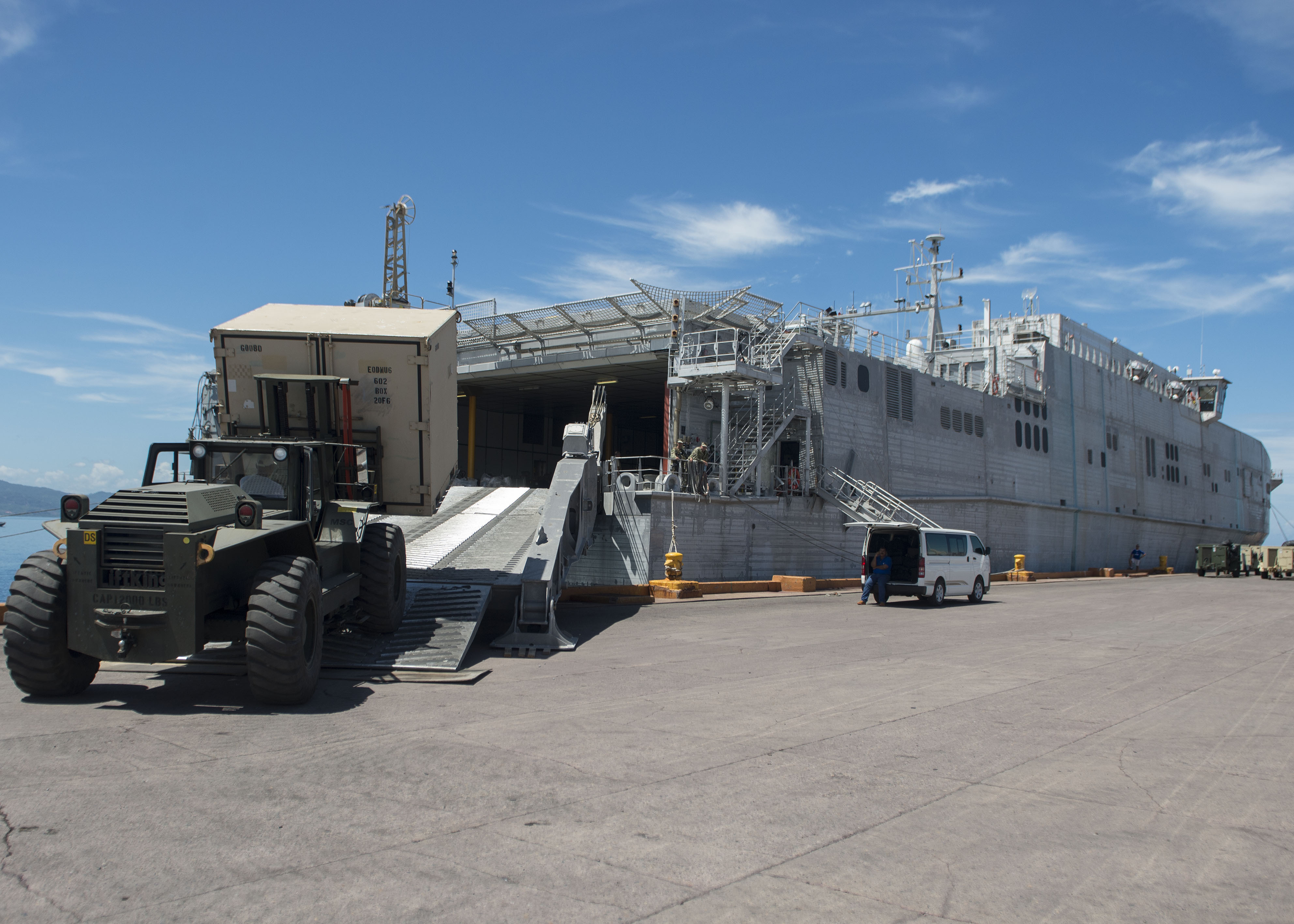
Ramp deployed and in use

The EPF has a greater level of comfort for the crew than larger Navy ships. The stateroom-style berthing areas for the ship's crew have private features including toilet stalls, outlets, air conditioning, and thermostats. People being transported are less well catered for. They may live in "hot racking"-style living arrangements of available berthing bunks if necessary. There is no ship's store in the typical Navy sense of the term, but the ship's captain may unlock the "slop chest" and sell ship's coins and other ship-specific paraphernalia on a case-by-case basis.

The ship is unstable in rough seas and at high speeds. At 10 knots in calm sea states the hull can roll up to four degrees to each side, while conventional ships would roll very little. This increases if the ship goes faster or in rougher conditions, raising the possibility of seasickness. To achieve its top speed the ship has to be traveling in waters not exceeding sea state 3, waves up to 1.25 m (4.1 ft) high. At sea state 4 it can travel at up to 15 knots, at only 5 knots in sea state 5, and has to hold position in any higher sea state. This reflects the ship's purpose of operating close to shore rather than in "blue water".

As of 2014, an EPF costs $180 million to build and has an annual operating cost of $26 million.

=== Other roles ===
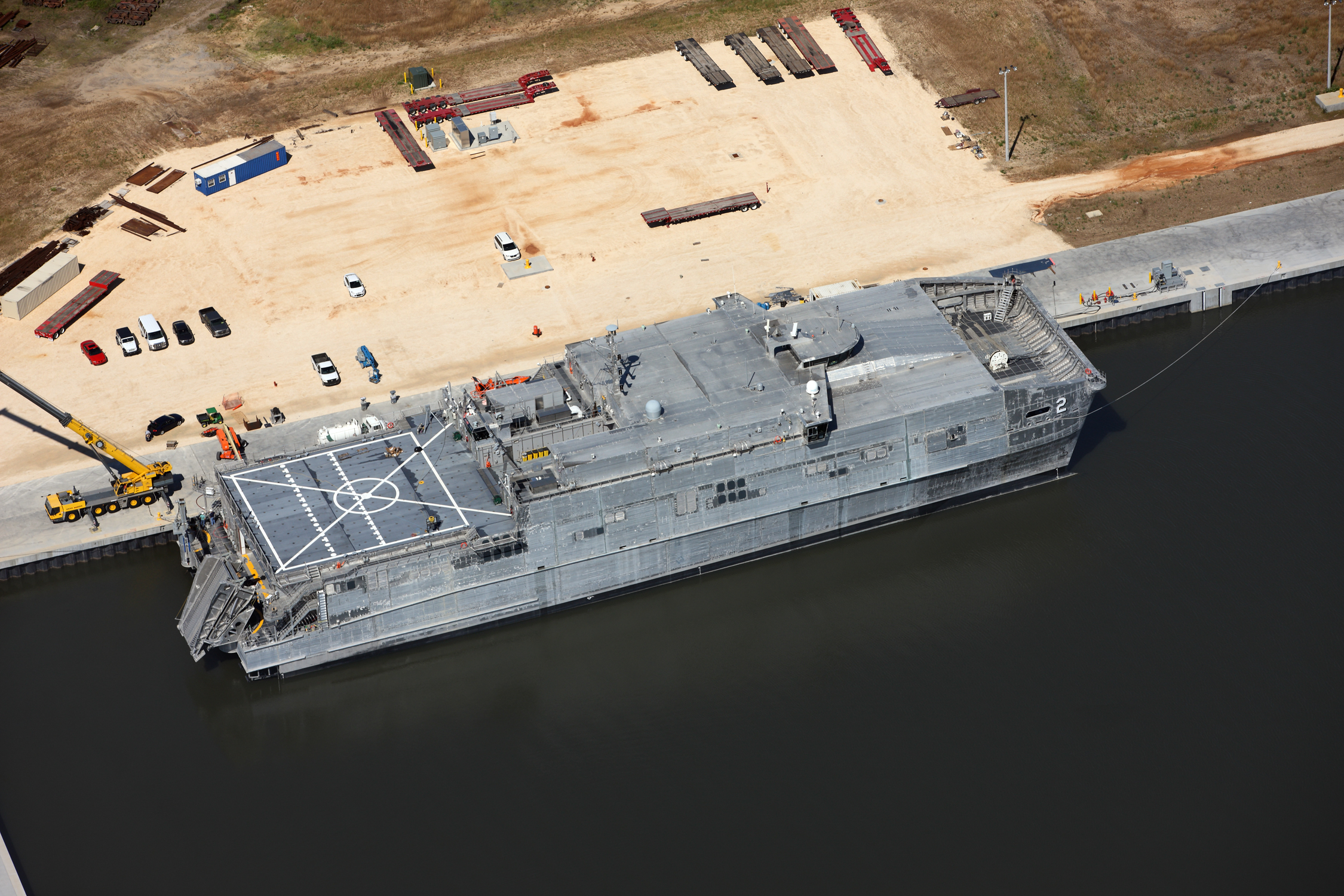
The Expeditionary Fast Transport USNS Choctaw County (EPF-2) awaits delivery at the Austal USA vessel completion yard.

The U.S. 4th Fleet has expressed interest in using the EPF as a low-cost ship for performing drug interdiction missions around Central and South America. U.S. Southern Command is experiencing a shortage of Coast Guard cutters available to interdict drug runners due to ship age and budget cuts. In May 2013, HSV-2 Swift conducted a drug interdiction patrol, showing that an aluminum catamaran was capable of performing the role. An EPF is capable of embarking a Coast Guard Law Enforcement Detachment (LEDET).

The EPF has no weapons or defensive systems to fulfill combat missions, but the Navy is looking to expand its roles to include re-supplying special operations forces and conducting humanitarian assistance missions. Chief of Naval Operations Jonathan Greenert has suggested using the ships as a cheaper way to perform counter-piracy missions to free up blue-water combatants. Offensive armament and defensive measures against pirates would be handled by a security team on board, and an EPF's speed would also be a good defense against an attack by pirates.

After various tests to explore the EPF's suitability to perform different missions, the ship was found to perform its primary role of intra-theater transport effectively, but had extreme difficulty in carrying out other suggested missions. When performing at-sea transfers of equipment with a Mobile Landing Platform (MLP), the EPF ramp used for vehicle transfers could not effectively operate with it in open ocean sea states of 2–3, and was determined to only be able to work in calm sea states found in protected harbors, an unacceptable constraint for operational deployment. The Navy has been aware of the current ramp's limitations and is developing one for use in up to sea states 3–4. When deploying a SEAL Delivery Vehicle (SDV), the EPF's stern-mounted crane could launch it in up to sea state 3 conditions, but support surface craft were needed to get divers into the underwater vehicle, which could only be launched in sea state 2.

=== Electronic systems ===
The electronic systems for this class are provided by General Dynamics Mission Systems. The infrastructure integrates the ship's electronic systems including: computing environment, internal and external communications, electronic navigation, aviation and armament systems, remote surveillance system, plus the entertainment & training system. The same General Dynamics OPEN CI is used on the Independence-class littoral combat ship, also built by Austal USA.

=== Amphibious assault ===
Marine Corps General John M. Paxton, Jr. called the EPF "a very capable ship" for certain missions, but cites several deficiencies as a substitute amphibious assault ship, including inability to operate in difficult sea states, survivability in contested waters, lack of a well deck to launch amphibious vehicles, and lack of "splash capability" to drive vehicles off the ramp into the sea. The ship has been rejected as a platform on which to base MV-22 Ospreys due to its weight, and potential flight deck damage from engines during take-off and landing.

The USMC is investigating changes to the EPF ramp to enable the "splash capability" for placing Amphibious Combat Vehicles into the water near the shore. A single EPF could carry and deploy 20 to 30 ACVs.

=== Expeditionary Medical Ship ===
Beginning with EPF-14, the ships will be designated as EPF Flight II, with increased health services capabilities while still maintaining most of the original mission of the ship. The Flight II variant is designed to bring enhanced medical capabilities at the request of Combatant Commanders, and allows patients to recover onboard rather than in a higher-level facility. They can respond faster, and to more places than the Navy's larger, slower and unarmed hospital ships. The EPF Flight II design includes upgrades to the medical facilities for resuscitation and surgery, enhanced support of V-22 flight operations, and enhanced launch and recovery of 11-meter rigid inflatable boats.

In January 2023, the Navy announced that three Expeditionary Medical Ships (EMS) had been approved in the 2023 military budget. They will be Bethesda, Balboa, and Portsmouth. These are planned to be about 118 metres (387 ft) versus the earlier ships 103 metres (338 ft), and have a draft of 4.5 metres (15 ft) for operations in "austere ports". The EMS will have four operating rooms and 124 medical beds, separated into acute care, acute isolation, ICU, and ICU isolation spaces. Two 11-meter rigid-hulled inflatable boats allow for the transfer of patients from other ships or water rescue; the flight deck has room for a single V-22, or an H-53 or H-60 helicopter. USNS Bethesda (T-EMS-1) is planned for delivery by December 2026.

== Program ==
The EPF program combines the Army's Theater Support Vessel (TSV) program, dating from 2004, with the Navy and Marine Corps High Speed Connector (HSC), requirement dating from 2004. The EPF program received Milestone A approval in May 2006. The Navy awarded Phase One preliminary design contracts in early 2008, and a detail design and construction contract in the 4th Quarter of FY08. The Navy's Program Executive Office, Ships will conduct acquisition for both the Army and Navy, but each service will fund its own ships. After delivery, each service will be responsible for manning, maintaining, and providing full lifecycle support for its vessels.

USNS Spearhead, the lead ship in the class, was launched in September 2011 and delivered to the Navy in early 2012. The Navy expected to purchase 23 EPF vessels over 30 years. On 2 May 2011, all Army JHSVs were transferred to the Navy. In June 2011, Austal was awarded construction contracts for EPF-6 and EPF-7. In February 2012, Austal was awarded construction contracts for EPF-8 and EPF-9. On 5 December 2012, the first ship in the class, USNS Spearhead, was delivered to Military Sealift Command in Mobile, Alabama. On 10 December 2012, the Navy awarded its final option under its current contract, and ordered EPF-10.

In April 2013, the EPF program was added to the remit of the Littoral Combat Ship Council, so that the capabilities of both ship types could be considered together. In 2014, the USN considered outsourcing the management of the fleet, but concluded that the ships would continue to be manned by civil service mariners.

Funding for the construction of an eleventh EPF was appropriated by Congress in the FY 2015 National Defense Authorization Act. In May 2016, the procurement of long-lead-time material and initial engineering support for the Expeditionary Fast Transport (EPF) 12, formerly Joint High Speed Vessel 12, was announced under the Naval Sea Systems Command's contracting activity. In September 2016, Austal was awarded a contract to design and construct EPF-11 and EPF-12. In February 2018, Navy Secretary Richard V. Spencer announced the name of T-EPF-12 as Newport.

Congress allocated money for a 13th Expeditionary Fast Transport (EPF) in the FY 2018 budget, and a 14th EPF in the FY 2019 budget. In October 2018, the navy awarded Austal a $57.8 million order to fund the procurement of long lead-time materials, which included diesel engines, water jets and reduction gears, for the construction of the 13th EPF. In December 2018, the navy awarded Austal a $40.4 million order to fund the procurement of long lead-time materials, which included diesel engines, water jets and reduction gears, for the construction of the 14th EPF.

In March 2019, the Navy awarded Austal a $262 million contract for the design and construction of two additional Expeditionary Fast Transport Ships, EPF-13 and EPF-14. This follows the long lead-time materials contracts awarded in October 2018, of $57.8M for EPF-13, and $40.4M in December 2018 for EPF-14. Construction of EPF-13 is scheduled to begin in late 2019, and EPF-14 is to follow in the middle of 2020. In February 2021, the U.S. Navy awarded Austal a $235 million contract for the detailed design and construction of EPF-15. EPF-15 will include enhanced medical capability.

Austal USA secured a contract from the US Department of Defense to carry out the detailed design, procurement, production implementation, and demonstration of autonomous capability in EPF-13.

=== History ===
In June 2011, a fifty-ton module was damaged at the Austal shipyard in Mobile during the construction of USNS Choctaw County.

In 2013 a Frost & Sullivan report predicted that sales could be made to APAC countries.

During operations in 2015, the first ship of the class, USNS Spearhead, experienced bow damage from rough seas requiring more than a half-million dollars (USD) to repair. It was determined that MSC operated the vessel outside of the recommended and approved Safe Operating Envelope (SOE) resulting in excessive slamming pressures to the bow which had been redesigned by Austal due to a Navy request to save weight in order to carry more cargo. This resulted in damaged bow structure. The first five ships in the class will require additional work done to improve the superstructure, at a cost of $350k-$1.2M each. The remaining ships which are still various stages of construction will require upgrading following construction as well.

== Derivatives ==
=== HSSV ===
In early 2014, Austal announced it had been awarded a $124.9 million contract for two High Speed Support Vessels (HSSV) for a foreign customer, later revealed to be the Royal Navy of Oman. The HSSV has a similar catamaran hull design as the EPF and supports naval operations including helicopter operations, rapid deployment of military personnel and cargo, and search and rescue missions. It is 72.5 m (238 ft) long and can travel at 35 knots. An HSSV has a crew of 69 personnel with 69 berths, can seat another 250, and has a cargo capacity of 320 tonnes (350 short tons). Both are to be delivered by 2016.

Austal launched the first HSSV, RNOV Al Mubshir, in October 2015 at its Henderson, Western Australia facility. It was delivered to Oman in May 2016.

== Ships in class ==
Ship	Laid down	Launched	Delivered	Status
Flight I
USNS Spearhead (T-EPF-1)	22 July 2010	12 September 2011	5 December 2012	Stricken
USNS Choctaw County (T-EPF-2)	8 November 2011	1 October 2012	6 June 2013	Towed to be scrapped
USNS Millinocket (T-EPF-3)	3 May 2012	5 June 2013	21 March 2014	Stricken
USNS Fall River (T-EPF-4)	20 May 2013	16 January 2014	15 September 2014	Stricken
USNS Trenton (T-EPF-5)	10 March 2014	30 September 2014	13 April 2015	In service
USNS Brunswick (T-EPF-6)	2 December 2014	19 May 2015	14 January 2016	In service
USNS Carson City (T-EPF-7)	31 July 2015	20 January 2016	24 June 2016	In service
USNS Yuma (T-EPF-8)	29 March 2016	17 September 2016	21 April 2017	In service
USNS City of Bismarck (T-EPF-9)	18 January 2017	7 June 2017	19 December 2017	In service
USNS Burlington (T-EPF-10)	26 September 2017	1 March 2018	15 November 2018	In service
USNS Puerto Rico (T-EPF-11)	9 August 2018	13 November 2018	10 December 2019	In service
USNS Newport (T-EPF-12)	29 January 2019	20 February 2020	3 September 2020	In service
USNS Apalachicola (T-EPF-13)	21 January 2021	13 November 2021	16 February 2023	In service
Flight II
USNS Cody (T-EPF-14)	26 January 2022	20 March 2023	11 January 2024	In service
USNS Point Loma (T-EPF-15)	27 June 2023	3 September 2024	24 June 2025	In service
USNS Lansing (T-EPF-16)	6 September 2024	25 February 2026		Under construction
Expeditionary Medical Ship
USNS Bethesda (T-EMS-1)				Awarded
USNS Balboa (T-EMS-2)				Awarded
USNS Portsmouth (T-EMS-3)				Awarded

== Related/similar projects ==
The Army and Navy have been operating HSVs for some time, including;

- HSV-X1 Joint Venture (joint Army/Navy)
- HSV-2 Swift (Navy)
- USAV Spearhead (TSV-X1) (Army)
- MV Westpac Express (HSV-4676) (Navy)
- Sea Slice (an experimental HSV) (Navy)

Other ships of note;

- USNS Guam (HST-1) (Navy)
- HST-2 (ex-Puerto Rico) (Navy)
- Sea Fighter (FSF-1) (Navy)
- Sea Shadow (IX-529) (Navy)
- M80 Stiletto (an experimental pentamaran) (DoD/ Navy)
- Juliet Marine Systems Ghost (an advanced super-cavitating stealth ship) (DoD/ Darpa/ Navy)

== See also ==
- Independence-class littoral combat ship
