= Sikorsky H-53 =

Military helicopter family

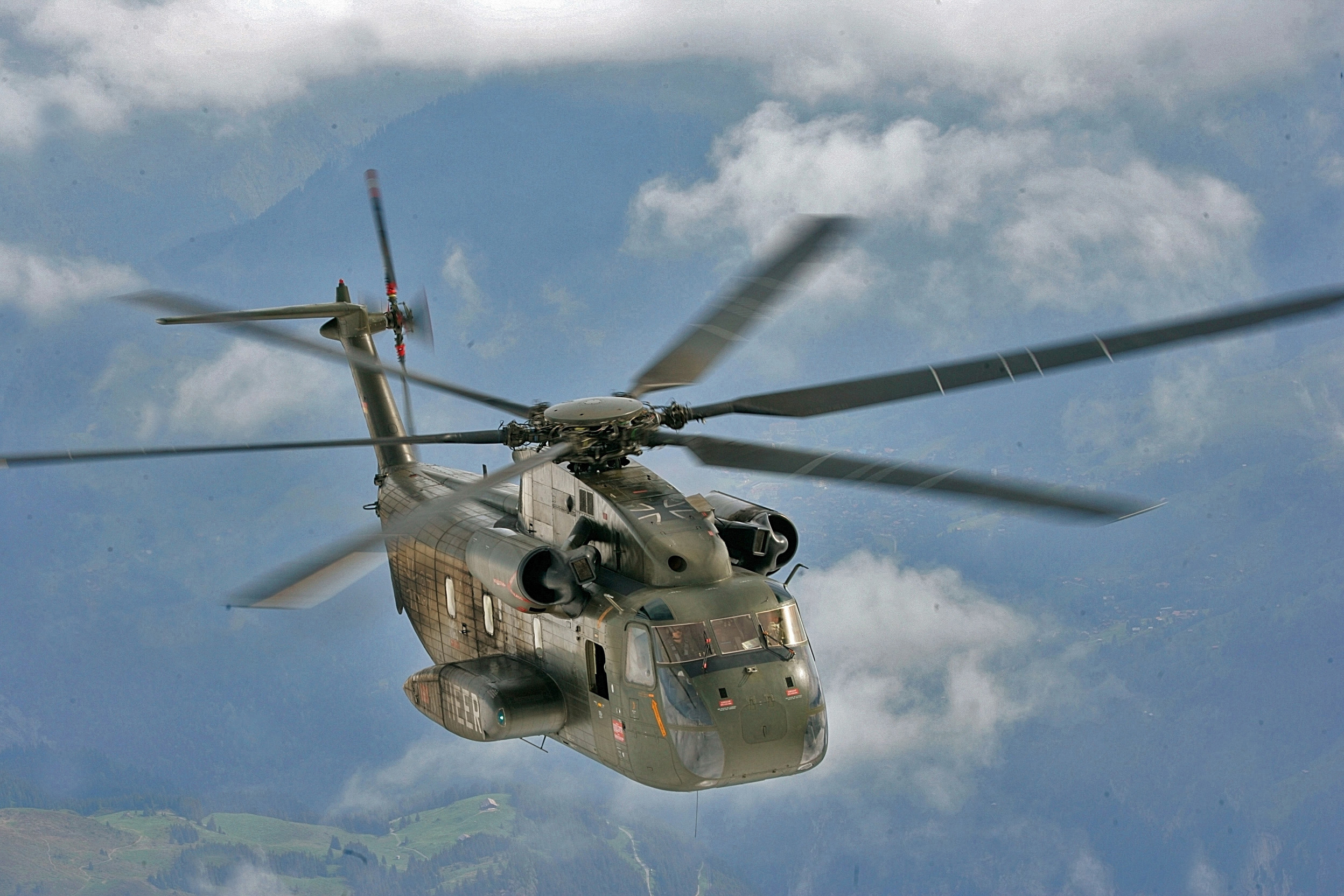
CH-53G of the German Army flying in the Alps, 2005

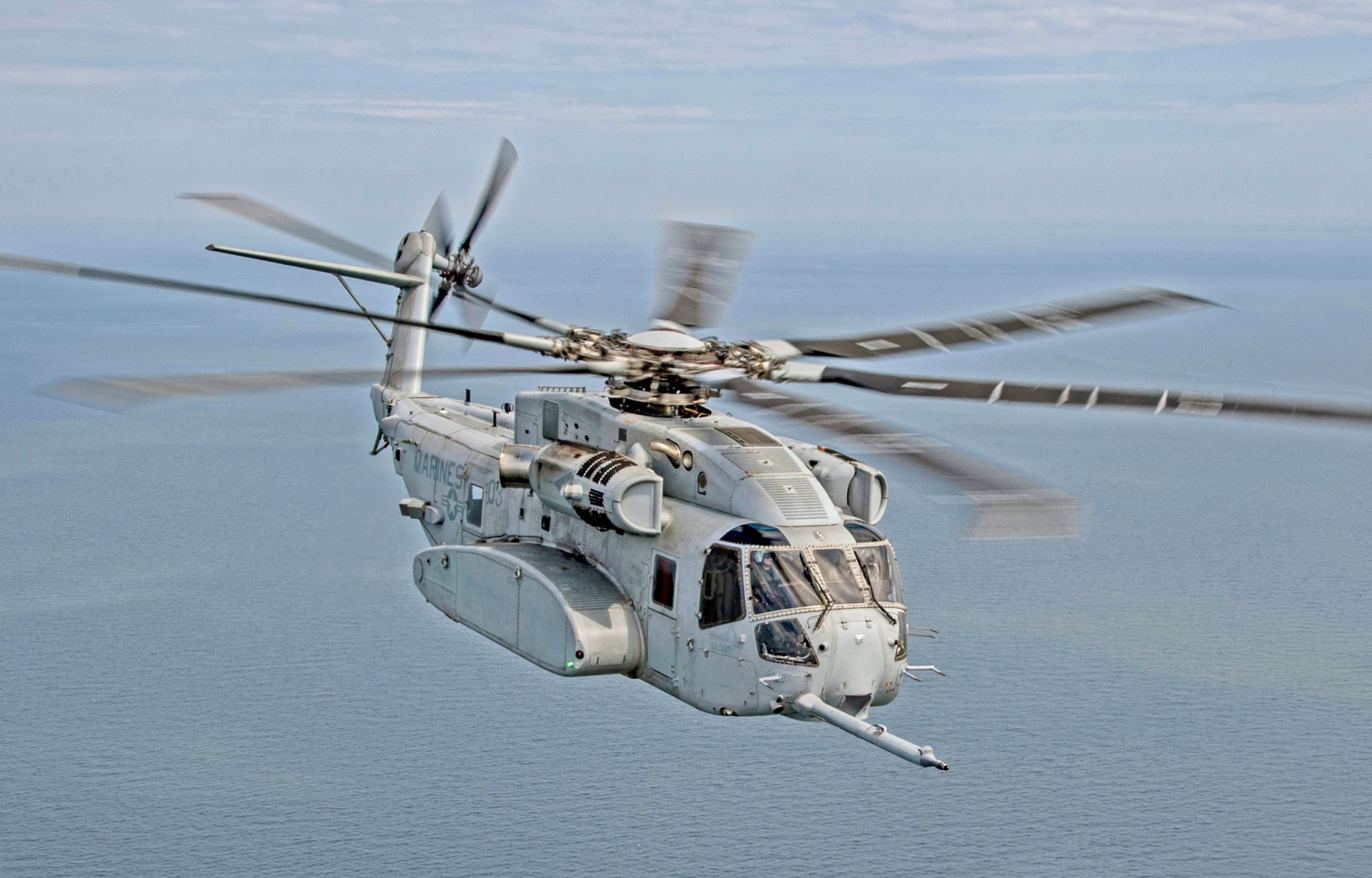
CH-53K King Stallion

The Sikorsky H-53 is a family of military helicopters built by Sikorsky Aircraft. H-53 is its United States military designation; the company has several designations for it including S-65, S-80, and S-95.

The helicopter is noted for Naval, Search and Rescue, Minesweeping, Special Operations, and Cargo. It entered service in the 1960s and has remained so with series of upgraded 2 and 3 engine models over the decades, and is still in production in the 21st century.

Variants include:

- Sikorsky CH-53 Sea Stallion (S-65), a heavy-lift helicopter introduced in 1966 with two engines, a six bladed main rotor and a four bladed tail rotor. Developed as a transport helicopter and an assault helicopter. Some early versions covered in that article include:
  - YCH-53, prototype version
  - CH-53A, first production version
  - CH-53G, for the German Army
  - CH-53Ö, for Austria
  - CH-53D, upgraded version with bigger cabin and new transmission
- Sikorsky MH-53 Pave Low and Sikorsky HH-53 Super Jolly Green Giant, upgraded helicopters with more powerful engines, improved avionics and armament used for combat search and rescue and special operations. Pave Low variants were retired in 2008.
- Sikorsky CH-53E Super Stallion (S-80) and Sikorsky MH-53E Sea Dragon, a heavier helicopter introduced in 1981, developed from the CH-53 Sea Stallion by adding a third engine, a seventh blade to the main rotor and canting the tail rotor 20 degrees. The MH-53E Sea Dragon is used for long range mine sweeping or airborne mine countermeasures.
- Sikorsky CH-53K King Stallion (S-95), an upgraded version with composite rotor blades, a wider cabin, and modernised systems that entered service in the 2020s and is in production.
