= USS Barite =

History

United States
- Name: USS Barite
- Laid down: 24 November 1943
- Launched: 18 February 1944
- Sponsored by: Mrs. S. C. Anderson
- Completed: 31 August 1944
- In service: 31 August 1944
- Out of service: 5 August 1946 transferred to the War Shipping Administration
- Stricken: 15 August 1946
- Fate: Sold to the Asia Development Corp. in China, delivered, 23 April 1948

General characteristics
- Class & type: Trefoil-class cargo barge
- Displacement: 10,970 long tons (11,146 t) full
- Length: 366 ft 4 in (111.66 m)
- Beam: 54 ft (16 m)
- Draft: 26 ft (7.9 m)
- Propulsion: None
- Speed: Not self-propelled
- Complement: 108 officers and men
- Armament: 4 × 20 mm AA guns

USS Barite (IX-161), a Trefoil-class concrete barge designated an unclassified miscellaneous vessel, was the only ship of the United States Navy to be named for barite, a yellow or white crystalline mineral found in metallic veins, resembling marble. Her keel was laid down under a Maritime Commission contract (T. B7 D1, MC hull 1335) on 24 November 1943 at South San Francisco, California, by the Belair Shipyard of Barrett and Hilp. She was designated IX-161 on 7 February 1944, launched on 18 February 1944 sponsored by Mrs. S. C. Anderson, and delivered to the Navy at her builder's yard on 31 August 1944. She was placed in service the same day under command of Lt. H. B. Stiehl USNR.

== Service history ==
=== World War II, 1944–1945 ===
Towed by Iroquois (AT-46), Barite departed San Francisco on 25 September 1944 and entered Pearl Harbor on the morning of 2 October. Clearing that port four days later, again astern of Iroquois, the barge proceeded to Eniwetok. Thence, under tow by the auxiliary ocean tug ATA-124, with Vaga (YTB-374) as "retriever" and YMS-276 as escort, Barite reached Ulithi, in the Caroline Islands, on 13 January 1945 and joined the armada of 225 ships present at that advanced base.

Barite served at Ulithi as a floating lubricating oil facility into the spring of 1945, when the advent of the typhoon season made it imperative to shift Service Squadron (ServRon) 10's base to locales other than the Western Caroline Islands. Towed thence to Saipan on 15 May, she operated at that island, in the same capacity, as a unit of Service Division 101, a part of ServRon 10. Towed from Saipan on 30 June 1945, Barite was moved to Leyte, where she served through V-J Day.

Reassigned from Service Division 101 directly to the parent command, ServRon 10, on 28 August 1945, Barite remained in Philippine waters for the remainder of her naval service.

=== Post-war activities and sale, 1945–1951 ===
Barite was taken out of service and delivered to the War Shipping Administration at Subic Bay on 5 August 1946, and her name was struck from the Naval Vessel Register on 15 August 1946. The War Shipping Administration declined her for the Reserve Fleet on 7th October 1946 and she returned to the War Department on 1 March 1947. Subsequently sold to the China-based Asia Development Corporation, the ship was delivered to her purchaser on 23 April 1948. She briefly appeared on the Lloyd's Register of Shipping in the 1950 and 1951 editions, after which time she disappeared from the scene.
