= List of appearances of the Golden Gate Bridge in popular culture =

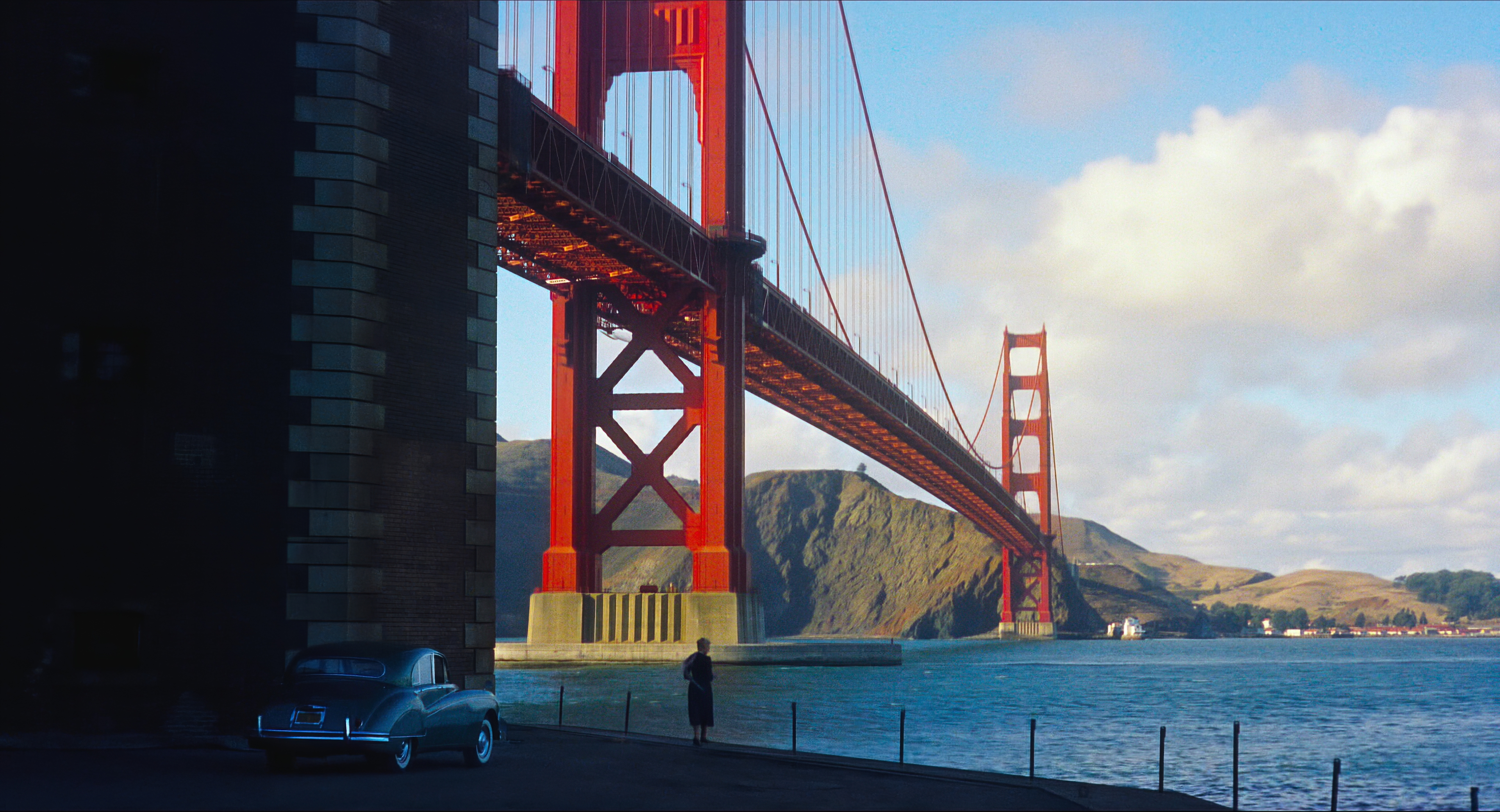
Kim Novak in the 1958 film Vertigo

As a prominent American landmark, and a noteworthy part of the San Francisco skyline, the Golden Gate Bridge has been used in a vast variety of publications for various reasons.

Below are compiled many depictions of the Golden Gate Bridge in Films, TV series, Documentaries, Video games and other media.

== List of media depicting the Golden Gate Bridge ==
=== Films ===
- Stranded (1935): The plot has lead Mack (George Brent) as "construction superintendent" of the Golden Gate Bridge as he hires and supervizes steelworkers on the job. The film's director shot some scenes on location at the bridge which were featured during this film.
- The Maltese Falcon (1941): used as place setting behind a "San Francisco" location marker at the beginning of the movie.
- Dark Passage (1947): Irene drives Parry across the bridge after his breakout from San Quentin; later, Parry and Baker have a confrontation at the rocky bluff at Fort Point, during which Baker falls to his death.
- Vertigo (1958): Madeleine stands under the bridge at Fort Point before jumping into the Bay.
- The Love Bug (1968): The bridge is seen when Herbie is about to launch himself off the bridge.
- Herbie Rides Again (1974): During a car chase, Herbie drives along a suspension cable on the bridge.
- Star Trek: The Motion Picture (1979): Seen in 2273, the bridge has been converted into a tram system leading to the Presidio, where Starfleet headquarters is situated.
- An Eye for an Eye 1981 film starring Chuck Norris; Norris drives over the bridge whilst heading to the final confrontation with the villain.
- National Lampoon's Vacation (1983) - seen as one of the postcards in the opening credits.
- A View to a Kill (1985): Zorin (antagonist) attempts to kill Bond (protagonist), who is hanging from one of the mooring ropes of an airship, by smashing him into the top of the bridge. Bond manages to secure the airship to the bridge, and a fist-fight at the top of the bridge ensues.
- Star Trek IV: The Voyage Home (1986): The bridge is almost hit by Admiral Kirk's out of control Klingon Bird of Prey.
- Flight of the Navigator (1986): David flies the Trimaxion Drone Ship under the bridge.
- The Abyss (1989): The bridge is missed
- Star Trek VI: The Undiscovered Country (1991)
- Interview with the Vampire (1994): Lestat de Lioncourt drives over the bridge.
- Homeward Bound II: Lost in San Francisco (1996): The Seavor family drives across the bridge to go to San Francisco International Airport. The pets later cross the bridge on their way home.
- The Rock (1996): The F/A-18Cs passes under the bridge.
- Bicentennial Man (1999): Seen expanded in the future (circa 2200s) with a two-tiered roadway added.
- Hulk (2003): The Hulk climbs to the top of the bridge and jumps onto a fighter jet.
- Land of the Lost (2009)
- Star Trek (2009) - In an alternate 2258, the Narada's damaged drill almost hits the bridge.
- Terminator Salvation (2009)
- 2012 (2009): The bridge is seen in the background when Harry Helmsley and Tony Delgatto's are boarding the cruise ship to Japan.
- The Book of Eli (2010): Eli and Solara drive over a semi-dilapidated bridge before rowing to Alcatraz island for the finale.
- Mission: Impossible – Ghost Protocol (2011): The bridge is seen as the disabled missile falls into the bay.
- Rise of the Planet of the Apes (2011): The bridge is hit and disrupted traffic, but not destroyed.
- Big Hero 6 (2014): A bridge in the style of Tokyo is present throughout the film
- Dawn of the Planet of the Apes (2014)
- Ant-Man (2015): Scott Lang returned to San Francisco and stopped by the bridge in Luis' van.
- Inside Out (2015): Riley Anderson and her family drive across the bridge as they move into San Francisco.
- Pixels (2015 film): The bridge is seen on the movie poster.
- Vacation (2015)
- Star Trek Beyond (2016)
- Sharknado: The 4th Awakens (2016)
- Bumblebee (2018): The bridge is seen when Charlie and Bumblebee arrive on a cliff overlooking the bridge.
- Beautiful Boy (2018): The bridge is seen in a scene where Nick stops the car and calls his sponsor.
- Venom (2018 film): The bridge is seen on the movie poster and throughout the film.
- Avengers: Endgame (2019): The bridge is seen near a memorial of victims of the Blip
- Sonic the Hedgehog (2020): The bridge is seen 4 times.
- The Mitchells vs. the Machines (2021): The bridge is seen when the PAL Max robots invade San Francisco.
- Shang-Chi and the Legend of the Ten Rings (2021)
- Finch (2021)
- Ant-Man and the Wasp: Quantumania (2023): Scott Lang and Hope Van Dyne are seen sitting on top of a tower of the Golden Gate Bridge watching the sunset, enjoying a beer and Chinese food.

==== Films where destroyed ====
The Golden Gate Bridge has been destroyed by many disasters in the following films:

- It Came from Beneath the Sea (1955): Destroyed by a giant octopus.
  footage of this scene is used in Godzilla 1998.
- Battle in Outer Space (1959): Destroyed by a meteor from space.
- Superman (1978): Partially destroyed by an earthquake.
- The Core (2003): Destroyed by unfiltered solar radiation.
- 10.5 (2004): Destroyed by a major earthquake.
- X-Men: The Last Stand (2006): Destroyed when moved to Alcatraz by Magneto, one of X-Men's villains.
  Towards the end, when Angel flies overhead, it can be seen in its original place and still standing.
- Mega Shark Versus Giant Octopus (2009): Destroyed by a giant monster attack.
- Monsters vs. Aliens (2009): During a battle with the probe, it topples over onto the span, resulting in the south tower's collapse.
- Meteor Storm (2010): Destroyed by a meteor shower.
- Pacific Rim (2013): Destroyed by a kaiju during the film's opening.
- Godzilla (2014): Destroyed by Godzilla after it cuts through the span.
- San Andreas (2015): A mega-tsunami carrying a cargo ship hits the bridge, causing it to collapse.
- Terminator Genisys (2015): Destroyed by a nuclear missile.
- Sharknado 5: Global Swarming (2017): Destroyed by a worldwide shark tornado, the titular "Sharknado".

=== Television ===
It has also been featured in the opening/closing and/or episodes of the following shows.

- 10.5
- Charmed
- Falcon Crest
- Full House
- Futurama
- Hotel
- Love is a Many Splendored Thing
- Monk
- My Sister Sam
- Nash Bridges
- Phyllis
- Star Trek's multiple series
- Suddenly Susan
- That's So Raven
- Too Close for Comfort
- We Bare Bears
- Monarch: Legacy of Monsters (Recaps from Godzilla)
- Marvel What If (2021): it appears in the episode What If... Zombies!?

=== Documentaries ===
It has been the subject of a 2006 documentary and a 2008-2010 documentary TV series:

- The Bridge – a film about suicides from Golden Gate Bridge in 2004.
- Life After People - A TV documentary series about what happens to the world if humanity suddenly disappears; the Golden Gate Bridge collapses after around 100 years due to corrosion in its support cables. After 200 years, only the towers remain intact.

=== Video games ===
- The bridge appeared in the 2000 video game Midtown Madness 2.
- The bridge is replicated in the 2004 video game Grand Theft Auto: San Andreas which is itself heavily based on San Francisco, Los Angeles and Las Vegas. There it is known as the "Gant Bridge".
- In Call of Duty: Advanced Warfare, the bridge is destroyed in the "Collapse" campaign mission after Atlas attach drones to the cables and detonate them.
- The 2011 game Driver: San Francisco, as its name implies, is set in San Francisco. It also features many missions modelled after famous movie car chases including one from Gone in 60 Seconds which ends at the Golden Gate Bridge.
- In Call of Duty: Black Ops 2 Zombies, the bridge also appeared when the zombies crew crashed into the bridge while escaping from Alcatraz.
- In Watch Dogs 2, the bridge appears in the game as it is set in the San Francisco Bay Area. In a side mission in the game, the character will paint graffiti on the Bridge.
- The Golden Gate Bridge also appeared in several SCS games like 18 Wheels of Steel series and American Truck Simulator as part of the game world.
- The bridge is a buildable wonder in the Civilization VI expansion Gathering Storm, marking its debut in the longstanding strategy series.
- The bridge appears in 2020's Marvel's Avengers during the first mission. The bridge is destroyed during an attack on San Francisco.
- A version of the bridge appears in the 2023 Sims 4 expansion pack Growing Together. The world San Sequoia is based on San Francisco.

=== Other ===
- KRON-TV, the former NBC/My Network TV affiliate used an animated version of the Golden Gate Bridge as their legal ID in the 1970s and 1980s.
- NORAD Tracks Santa, the Golden Gate Bridge was a featured Santa Cam location for the 2002 tracking season.
- A small-scale replica of the bridge was previously used at the main entry point of Disney's California Adventure Park in Anaheim, California. The replica was replaced in the early 2010s by a small-scale model of the Glendale-Hyperion Bridge as part of the entrance plaza's transformation into a re-creation of Los Angeles' Buena Vista Street. But it came back in 2023 with San Fransokyo Square land replacing the Pacific Wharf land and it is still featured on Soarin' when it is Soarin' Over California.
- In the Sliders episode "Post Traumatic Slide Syndrome", the Golden Gate Bridge is blue, which is how Wade finds out the Earth they have landed on is not Earth Prime.
- In the Star Trek: Deep Space Nine episode "The Changing Face of Evil", set in 2375, the Golden Gate Bridge is damaged in a Breen attack on Starfleet Headquarters. In the Star Trek: Voyager episode "Pathfinder", set in 2376, it is shown to have been repaired.
- The bridge is the main setting for the Alistair Maclean novel The Golden Gate.
- The cover for the EP Interstate 8 by Modest Mouse features an image of the bridge.
