= Barrett and Hilp =

- Company type: General contractor
- Industry: Construction
- Predecessor: Larry Barrett Tire Company
- Founded: 1912
- Founders: J. Frank Barrett; Harry Hilp Sr. Larry Barrett
- Defunct: September 1953; 72 years ago
- Fate: Split
- Successors: Barrett Construction Company; Hilp and Rhodes Company
- Headquarters: San Francisco, United States
- Area served: Bay Area
- Products: Golden Gate Bridge; Santa Rosa Memorial Hospital; Seals Stadium

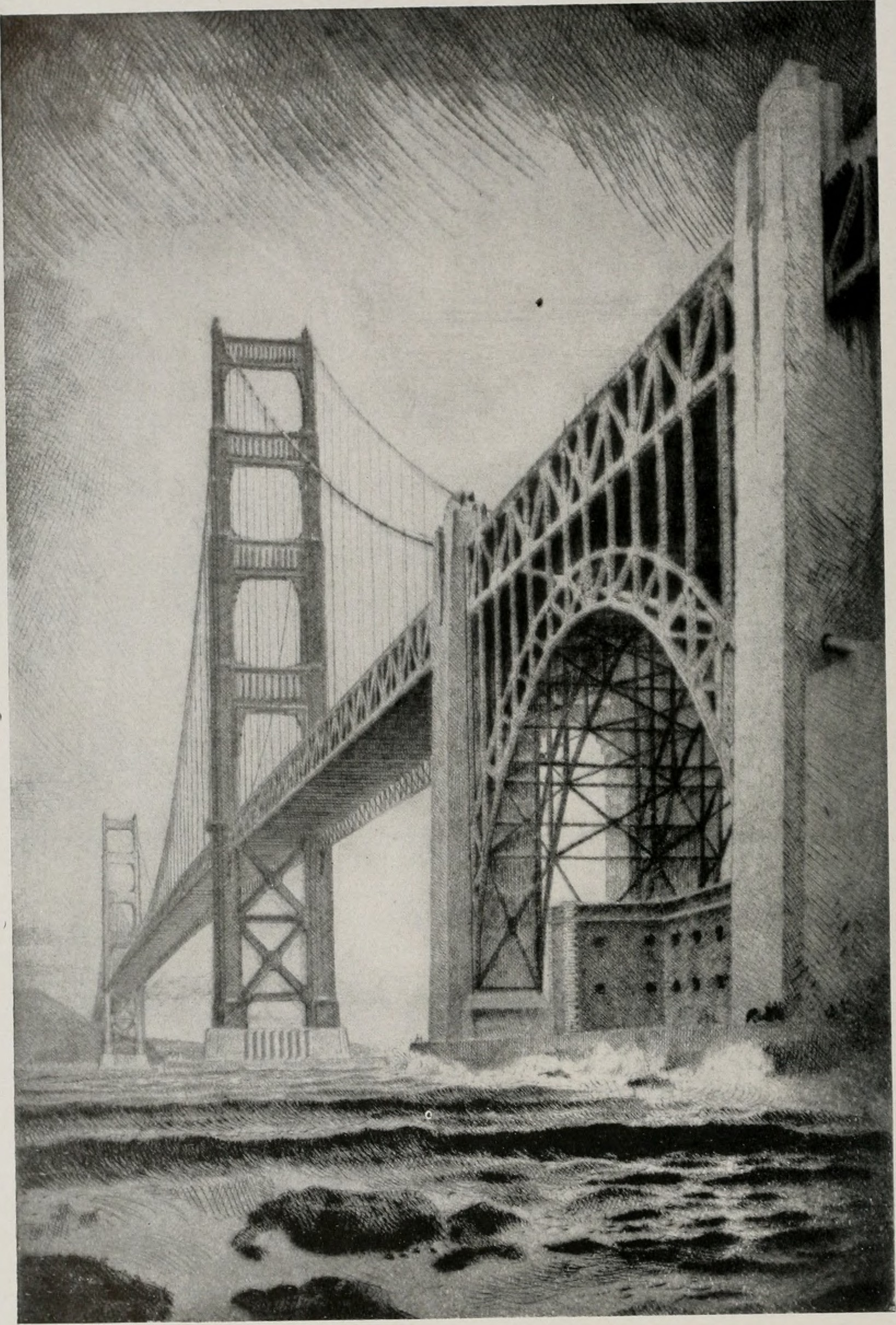
The Golden Gate Bridge, which Barrett and Hilp were instrumental in building

Barrett and Hilp was a construction company and general contractor founded in San Francisco by Harry Hilp Sr. and brothers J. Frank and Larry Barrett in 1912. The company played a large part in the construction of the Golden Gate Bridge.

== History ==
Barrett and Hilp constructed the anchorage, piers, and lower span of the Golden Gate Bridge. As part of the lower span, Barrett and Hilp designed a trolley system that traversed the bridge, and was the earliest form of public transit across the bridge.

The firm also played a pivotal role in the reconstruction of San Francisco after the 1906 San Francisco earthquake, constructing the Southern Pacific Transportation Company Hospital #2, for $450,000 plus an undisclosed fee. In 1931, the firm constructed the San Francisco Baseball Club's Seals Stadium.

The firm was also awarded a $200,000 contract for its role in the construction of the Metropolitan Aqueduct, also, as the construction of many of Los Angeles' suburban homes. Additionally, during World War II, the company constructed 20 concrete barges for the U.S. Navy. One such barge, B7-D1, saw life after the war shipping limestone from Alaska to L.A. as part of the city's booming concrete industry.

The right's to the barge's scrap was contentious as two employees of the shipping company claimed compensation due to personal injuries, meanwhile the Alaska Aggregate Corporation, who had purchased the barge from Foss Launch & Tug Co., sought to scrap the ship, resulting in a decade long court case, John A. Scudero v. Todd Shipyards Corporation which eventually reached the U.S. Supreme Court which found that the company which was sued, Todd Shipyards, was not liable to be sued since the employees where subcontractors for Barrett and Hilp.

In September 1953 the principles of the firm, the Barrets and Hilp, had a falling out, resulting in the firm splitting into the Barrett Construction Company and the Hilp and Rhodes Company. At the time of the firm's split, it had over 13 locations and was making over $20,000,000 a year. (Note: Adjusted for inflation c. 2023 is equal to $227,669,892.03)
