= Aviat Networks =

Telecommunications company

Aviat Networks, Inc.
- Company type: Public
- Traded as: Nasdaq: AVNW; Russell Microcap Index component
- Industry: Telecommunications
- Predecessor: Harris Stratex Networks
- Founded: January 28, 2010; 16 years ago
- Headquarters: Austin, Texas, United States
- Number of locations: 44 Offices
- Area served: Worldwide
- Key people: Peter Smith (CEO)
- Products: Dual Hybrid/Packet Microwave; All Packet Microwave; Trunking Microwave
- Services: Network Management
- Revenue: ▲US$408 million (FY 2024)
- Operating income: ▼US$19.401 million (FY 2024)
- Net income: ▲US$10.76 million (FY 2024)
- Total assets: ▲US$535 million (FY 2024)
- Total equity: ▲US$256 million (FY 2024)
- Number of employees: 708 (2019)
- Website: www.aviatnetworks.com

Aviat Networks, Inc. is a global provider of microwave transport and backhaul solutions, providing public and private operators with communications infrastructure to serve telecommunications operators and enterprise customers.

Headquartered in Austin, Texas since November 2019, Aviat Networks has operations in North and South America, Africa, Asia Pacific, Europe and the Middle East.

The company hired Peter Smith as its President and CEO on January 2, 2020.

== History ==
The company was founded on January 29, 2007 with the merger of Harris Corporation’s Microwave Communications Division and Stratex Networks and incorporated under the name Harris Stratex Networks. The company renamed and rebranded itself to become Aviat Networks on January 28, 2010. Stratex Networks was the new name for Digital Microwave Corporation (DMC) which was founded in 1984 in San Jose, California.

In February 2009, Harris Stratex acquired Telsima, developer and provider of WiMAX Forum Certified products for use in next-generation broadband wireless networks, for $12 million. In September 2008, Harris Stratex announced a partnership agreement with Telsima for end-to-end 4G network solutions.

In July 2022, Aviat completed the acquisition of Redline Communications, a provider of data infrastructure equipment.

=== Name and ticker symbol change ===
On January 28, 2010, at the opening of the Nasdaq trading session, Harris Stratex Networks announced they had renamed their company to become Aviat Networks. Along with the name change the company unveiled new corporate branding with a new company logo and relaunch of the corporate website. The company also changed their NASDAQ ticker symbol to AVNW. The new symbol began trading on the morning of January 29, 2010, retiring the old HSTX; this date also marked the company's third anniversary since incorporation.

== Customer profile and recent contracts ==
Aviat Networks customers include fixed and mobile operators, public safety operators, state and federal governments, utilities, oil and gas companies, broadcast and transportation network operators worldwide.

== Products and solutions ==
Aviat's portfolio of wireless products encompasses microwave and millimeter wave bands between 5 and 80 GHz. Architectures supported include split-mount (indoor/outdoor), all-outdoor and all-indoor radio designs to accommodate operators' specific needs.
