= List of Victory ships (B) =

This is a list of Victory ships with names beginning with B.

== Description ==
A Victory ship was a cargo ship. The cargo ships were 455 feet 3 inches (138.76 m) overall, 436 feet 6 inches (133.05 m) between perpendiculars They had a beam of 62 feet 0 inches (18.90 m), a depth of 38 feet 0 inches (11.58 m) and a draught of 28 feet 0 inches (8.53 m). They were assessed at 7,612 GRT, 4,555 NRT and 10,750 DWT.

The ships were powered by a triple expansion steam engine, driving a steam turbine via double reduction gear. This gave the ship a speed of 15.5 knots (28.7 km/h) or 16.5 knots (30.6 km/h), depending on the machinery installed.

Liberty ships had five holds. No. 1 hold was 57 feet 6 inches (17.53 m) long, with a capacity of 81,715 cubic feet (2,313.9 m^{3}), No. 2 hold was 45 feet 0 inches (13.72 m) long, with a capacity of 89,370 cubic feet (2,531 m^{3}), No. 3 hold was 78 feet 0 inches (23.77 m) long, with a capacity of 158,000 cubic feet (4,500 m^{3}), No. 4 hold was 81 feet 0 inches (24.69 m) long, with a capacity of 89,370 cubic feet (2,531 m^{3}) and No. 5 hold was 75 feet 0 inches (22.86 m) long, with a capacity of 81,575 cubic feet (2,309.9 m^{3}).

In wartime service, they carried a crew of 62, plus 28 gunners. The ships carried four lifeboats. Two were powered, with a capacity of 27 people and two were unpowered, with a capacity of 29 people.

== Bandera ==
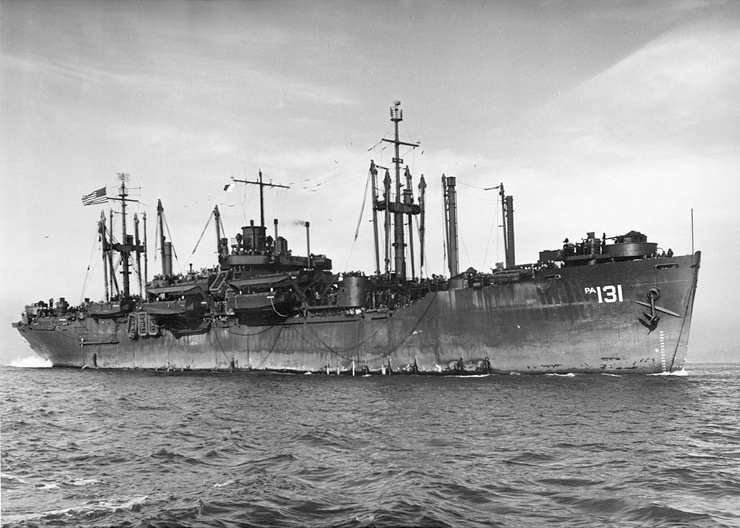
USS Bandera

Bandera was built by California Shipbuilding Corporation, Terminal Island, Los Angeles, California. Her keel was laid on 23 July 1944. She was launched on 6 October and delivered on 30 November. Built for the United States Navy. To the United States Maritime Commission (USMC) in 1946 and laid up in the James River. She was scrapped at Brownsville, Texas in 1974.

== Bardstown Victory ==
Bardstown Victory was built by Bethlehem Fairfield Shipyard, Baltimore, Maryland. Her keel was laid on 4 December 1944. She was launched on 15 February 1945 and delivered on 16 March. Built for the WSA, she was operated under the management of United Fruit Company. Laid up in Suisun Bay in 1946. she was scrapped at Oakland, California in March 1958.

== Barnard Victory ==
Barnard Victory was built by Permanente Metals Corporation, Richmond, California. Her keel was laid on 17 February 1945. She was launched on 31 March and delivered on 25 April. Built for the WSA, she was operated under the management of American President Lines. Laid up in Suisun Bay in 1948. Returned to service in 1966 due to the Vietnam War. Operated under the management of Alaska Steamship Company. Laid up in Suisun Bay in 1972. She was sold for scrapping at Brownsville in 2006.

== Barnwell ==
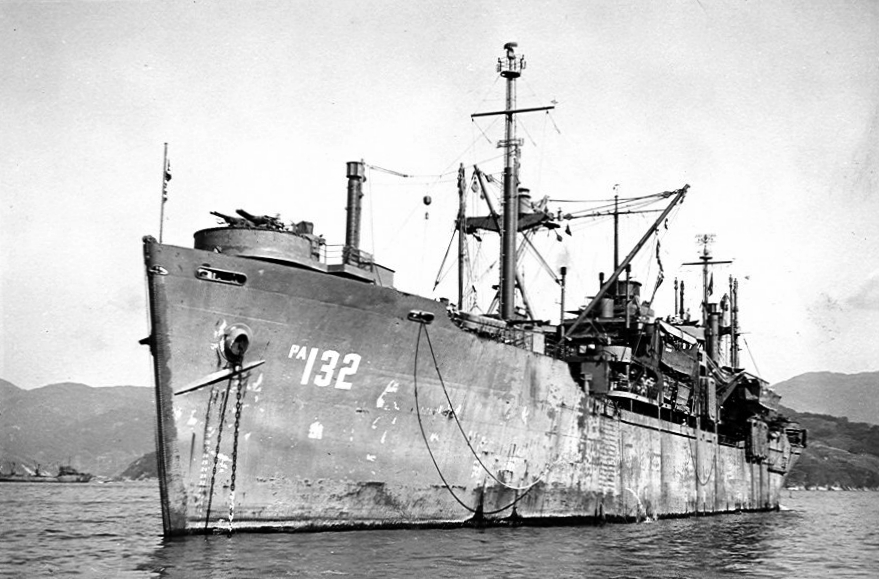
USS Barnwell

Barnwell was built by California Shipbuilding Corporation. Her keel was laid on 25 July 1944. She was launched on 30 September and delivered on 19 January 1945. Built for the United States Navy. Returned to USMC in 1947. To the United States Navy in 1951. To the United States Maritime Administration in 1959. Laid up in the James River. She was scrapped in 1982.

== Barre Victory ==
Barre Victory was built by Bethlehem Fairfield Shipyard. Her keel was laid on 14 June 1945. She was launched on 31 July and delivered on 6 September. Built for the WSA, she was operated under the management of American Export Line. Laid up in Suisun Bay in 1948, she was later transferred to the James River. She was scrapped in China in 1993.

== Bartlesville Victory ==
Bartlesville Victory was built by California Shipbuilding Corporation. Her keel was laid on 21 November 1944. She was launched on 13 January 1945 and delivered on 13 February. Built for the WSA, she was operated under the management of De La Rama Steamship Company, Inc. Laid up in the Hudson River in 1948. Sold in 1962 to Consolidated Mariners Inc., New York and renamed Taddei Victory. Renamed Wingless Victory in 1966. Sold in 1970 to Kathy Maritime S.A., Panama and renamed Kathlena. She was scrapped at Kaohsiung, Taiwan in October 1971.

== Bates Victory ==
Bates Victory was built by California Shipbuilding Corporation. Her keel was laid on 9 March 1945. She was launched on 2 May and delivered on 26 May. Built for the WSA, she was operated under the management of General Steamship Company. Laid up in the Hudson River in 1948. Sold in 1950 to Isbrandtsen Co. Inc., New York and renamed Remsen Heights. To American Export Lines, New York in 1962, then American Export-Isbrandtsen Lines, New York in 1964. Sold in 1968 to Valmar Shipping Agency, New York and renamed Eastern Star. Sold in 1970 to Compania Comercial Transatlantica S.A., Panama and renamed Philomila. She was scrapped at Kaohsiung in April 1971.

== Baton Rouge Victory ==
Baton Rouge Victory was built by Bethlehem Fairfield Shipyard. Her keel was laid on 21 June 1945. She was launched on 22 August and delivered on 24 September. Built for the WSA, she was operated under the joint management of American Export Line and Isthmian Steamship Corp. Laid up in the James River in 1947. Returned to service in 1950 due to the Korean War. Laid up in Suisun Bay in 1952. Returned to service in 1966 due to the Vietnam War. She struck a mine and sank in the Saigon River on 23 August 1966 whilst on a voyage from San Francisco to Saigon. She was subsequently refloated and towed to Vũng Tàu. Declared a constructive total loss, she was sold to Hong Kong shipbreakers in May 1967. Resold, she was scrapped at Hualien, Taiwan in September 1967.

== Battle Creek Victory ==
Battle Creek Victory was built by Permanente Metals Corporation. Her keel was laid on 31 May 1945. She was launched on 11 July and delivered on 17 August. Built for the WSA, she was operated under the management of Marine Transport Line. Laid up at Wilmington, North Carolina in 1948. Returned to service in 1966 due to the Vietnam War. Laid up at Beaumont, Texas in 1973. She was scrapped at Alang, India in 1993.

== Baylor Victory ==
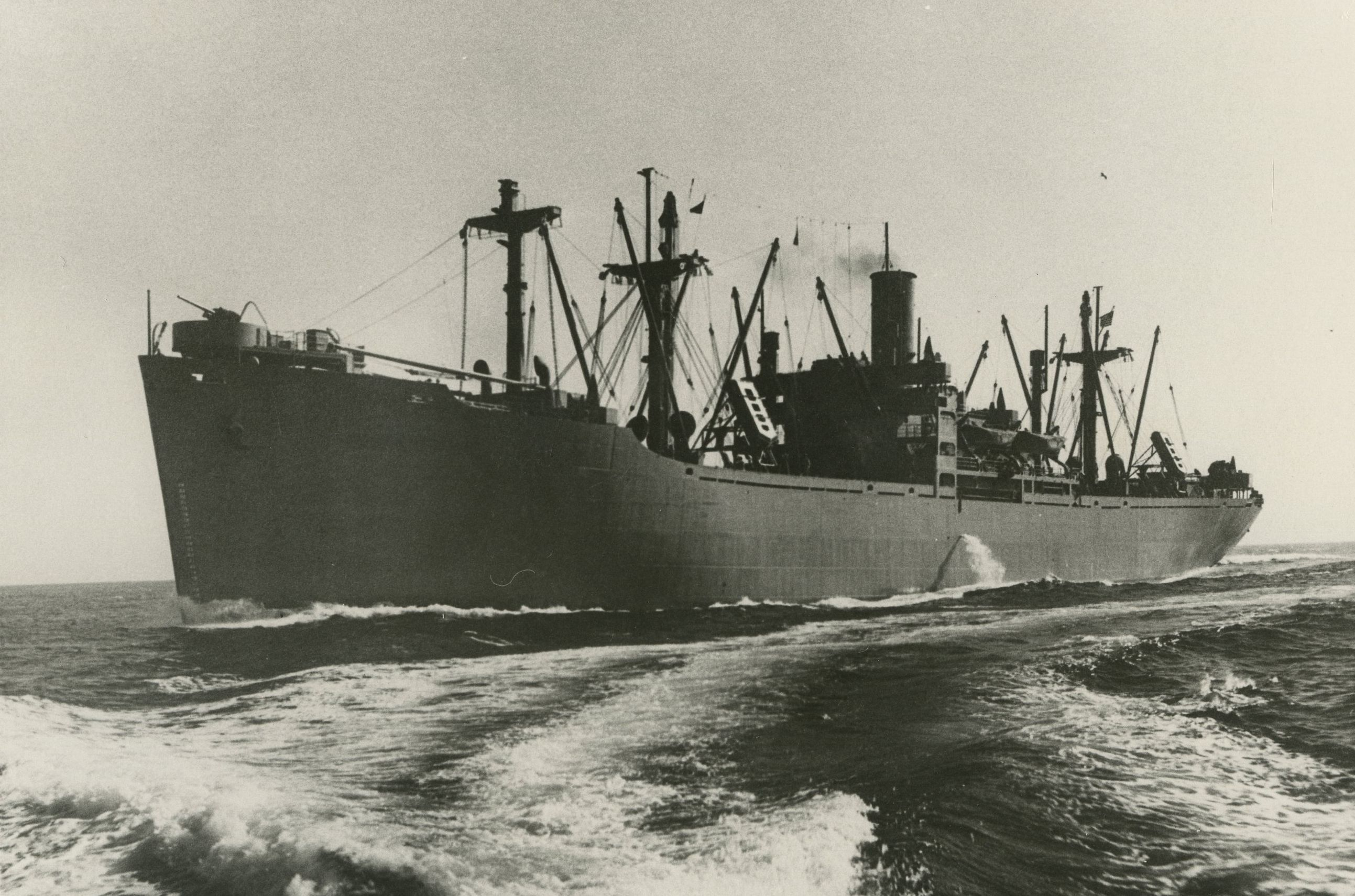
Baylor Victory

Baylor Victory was built by California Shipbuilding Corporation. Her keel was laid on 13 January 1945. She was launched on 6 March and delivered on 30 March. Built for the WSA, she was operated under the management of American-Hawaiian Steamship Company. Laid up at Mobile in 1949. Returned to service in 1966 due to the Vietnam War. At Yokosuka, Japan in 1970 in a damaged condition. She was scrapped at Kaohsiung in November 1970.

== Beatrice Victory ==
Beatrice Victory was built by Permanente Metals Corporation. Her keel was laid on 27 October 1944. She was launched on 27 December and delivered on 28 January 1945. Built for the WSA, she was operated under the management of Agwilines Inc. Laid up at Wilmington, North Carolina in 1948, she was later transferred to the James River. She was scrapped at Alang in 1993.

== Beaver Victory ==
Beaver Victory was built by California Shipbuilding Corporation. Her keel was laid on 19 January 1945. She was launched on 14 March and delivered on 7 April. Built for the WSA, she was operated under the management of Isthmian Steamship Corp. Laid up in the James River in 1950, she was later transferred to Beaumont. She was scrapped at Brownsville in 1985.

== Beckham ==
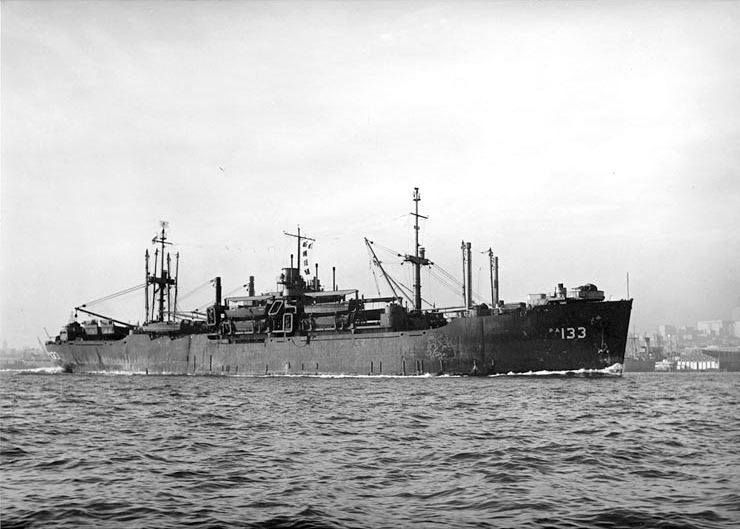
USS Beckham

Beckham was built by California Shipbuilding Corporation. Her keel was laid on 27 July 1944. She was launched on 14 October and delivered on 9 December. Built for the United States Navy. To the USMC in 1946 and laid up in the James River. She was scrapped in the Netherlands in 1974.

== Bedford Victory ==
Bedford Victory was built by Permanente Metals Corporation. Her keel was laid on 20 July 1944. She was launched on 13 September and delivered on 11 November. Built for the United States Navy. To the USMC in 1946, laid up in the James River. Later transferred to Olympia, Washington. She was sold for scrapping in 1972, and was scrapped at Seattle in 1973.

== Belgium Victory ==
Belgium Victory was built by Oregon Shipbuilding Corporation, Portland, Oregon. Her keel was laid on 6 January 1944. She was launched on 13 March and delivered on 14 April. Built for the WSA, she was operated under the management of Sudden & Christenson. Laid up in the James River in 1949, she was later transferred to Olympia. She was scrapped at Seattle in 1973.

== Bellingham Victory ==
Bellingham Victory was built by Oregon Shipbuilding Corporation. Her keel was laid on 26 June 1945. She was launched on 18 August and delivered on 24 September. Built for the WSA, she was operated under the management of Alaska Steamship Company. Sold in 1949 to Compania Argentina de Navigation Dodero, Buenos Aires, Argentina and renamed Marinero. Sold in 1949 to Flota Argentina de Navigation de Ultramar, Buenos Aires. She collided with the British cargo ship Cressington Court in the River Plate on 27 July 1954. Sold in 1961 to Empresa Lineas Maritimas, Buenos Aires. She was scrapped at Puerto Galvan, Argentina in 1977.

== Beloit Victory ==
Beloit Victory was built by Oregon Shipbuilding Corporation. Her keel was laid on 25 April 1944. She was launched on 3 June and delivered on 7 July. Built for the WSA, she was operated under the management of McCormick Steamship Co. Laid up at Beaumont in 1948, she was later transferred to Mobile. Sold in 1966 to Metro Petroleum Shipping Co., New York. She was scrapped at Kaohsiung in April 1969.

== Berea Victory ==
Berea Victory was built by Permanente Metals Corporation. Her keel was laid on 20 January 1945. She was launched on 3 March and delivered on 28 March. Built for the WSA, she was operated under the management of Weyerhaeuser Steamship Company. Laid up in the Hudson River in 1948, she was later transferred to Suisun Bay. She was scrapped in China in 1993.

== Bergen ==
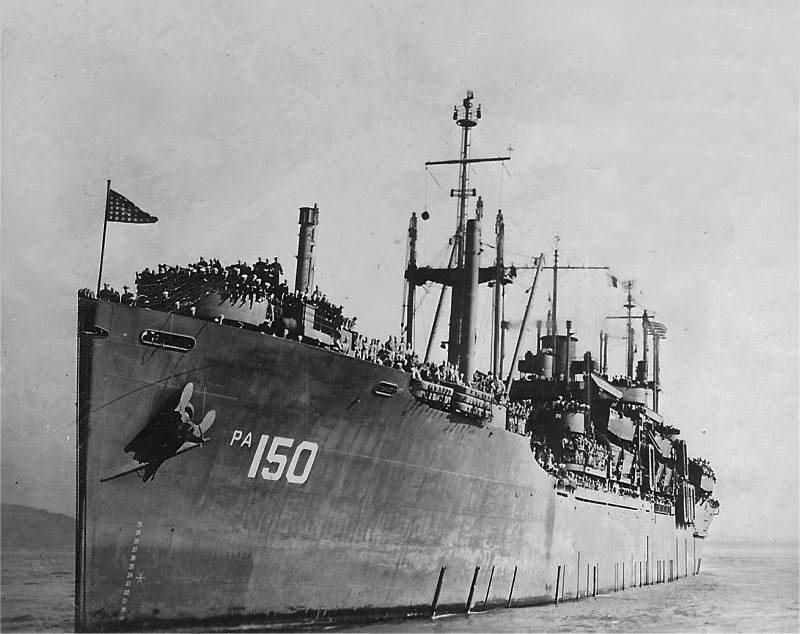
USS Bergen

Bergen was built by Kaiser Company, Vancouver, Washington. Her keel was laid on 25 October 1944. She was launched on 5 December and delivered on 23 January 1945. Built for the United States Navy. To the WSA in 1946 and laid up in the James River. She was sold to New York shipbreakers in April 1973.

== Berkeley Victory ==
Berkeley Victory was built by Permanente Metals Corporation. Built for the WSA, she was operated under the management of Moore-McCormack Lines. Laid up at Wilmington, North Carolina in 1948. Returned to service in 1966 due to the Vietnam War. Operated under the management of American President Lines. Laid up in Suisun Bay in 1973. She was scrapped in China in 1993.

== Berry Victory ==
Berry Victory was built by Permanente Metals Corporation. Her keel was laid on 8 April 1945. She was launched on 19 May and delivered on 13 June. Built for the WSA, she was operated under the management of W. R. Chamberlain. Sold in 1946 to N.V. Java-China-Japan Lijn, Amsterdam and renamed Tjikampek. To N.V. Java-China Paketvaart Lijnen, Amsterdam in 1947, then to N.V. Koninklikje Java-China Paketvaart Lijnen, Amsterdam later that year. She was scrapped at Hong Kong in March 1970.

== Berwyn Victory ==
Berwyn Victory was built by Permanente Metals Corporation. Her keel was laid on 27 May 1945. She was launched on 7 July and delivered on 13 August. Built for the WSA, she was operated under the management of Agwilines Inc. Sold in 1947 to China Mutual Steam Navigation Co., Liverpool, United Kingdom and renamed Maron. Renamed Rhesus in 1959. Laid up in 1960. Sold in 1962 to Overseas Maritime Co., Liberia and renamed Pacific Telstar. She was scrapped in Taiwan in 1974.

== Bessemer Victory ==
Bessemer Victory was built by California Shipbuilding Corporation. Her keel was laid on 28 May 1945. She was launched on 26 July and delivered on 30 August. Built for the WSA, she was operated under the management of Hammond Shipping Company. Laid up at Mobile in 1950. It was planned that she would become a special project ship for NASA in 1966, operated by the United States Navy as Bessemer. However, the plan was not proceeded with and she was operated in commercial service under charter. Laid up in the James River in 1973. She was scrapped at Alang in 1991.

== Bexar ==
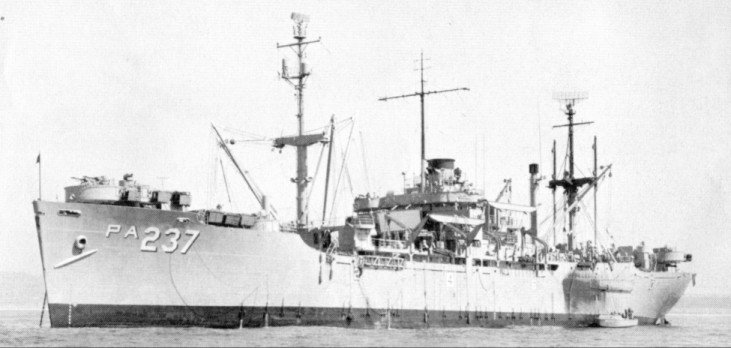
USS Bexar

Bexar was built by Oregon Shipbuilding Corporation. Her keel was laid on 2 June 1945. She was launched on 25 July and delivered on 9 October. Built for the United States Navy. Laid up in Suisun Bay in 1969. She was scrapped in 1982.

== Biddeford Victory ==
Biddeford Victory was built by Bethlehem Fairfield Shipyard. Her keel was laid on 27 June 1945. She was launched on 23 August and delivered on 25 September. Built for the WSA, she was operated under the management of William J. Rountree Company. Sold in 1948 to United States Lines and renamed American Counselor. On 20 February 1954, she rescued two survivors of the French fishing vessel Duc de Normandie, which had capsized off the Dutch coast. Sold in 1956 to Transglobe Shipping Line, New York and renamed Transglobe. Sold in 1957 to Compania Navigation Continental, Liberia. Sold in 1959 to Prudential Steamship Corporation and renamed Biddeford Victory. To the United States Department of Commerce in 1959, leased back to Prudential Steamship Corporation. Laid up in the James River in 1970. She was scrapped at Brownsville in 1976.

== Billings Victory ==
Billings Victory was built by Oregon Shipbuilding Corporation. Her keel was laid on 10 July 1945. She was launched on 28 September and delivered on 1 November. Built for the WSA, she was operated under the joint management of Pacific-Atlantic Steamship Corp. and States Steamship Co. She was laid up in the Hudson River in 1948. Sold in 1950 to States Steamship Co. and renamed Washington. Sold in 1955 to Matson Navigation Co., San Francisco and renamed Hawaiian Trader. Sold in 1961 to Ocean Cargoes Inc., New York and renamed Rachel V. Sold in 1961 to Rachel V. Steamship Corp. and renamed Cathy. Operated under the management of her former owners. Renamed Rachel V. in 1964. Sold in 1065 to Vantage Steamship Corp., New York. She was scrapped at Kaohsiung in April 1970.

== Bingham ==
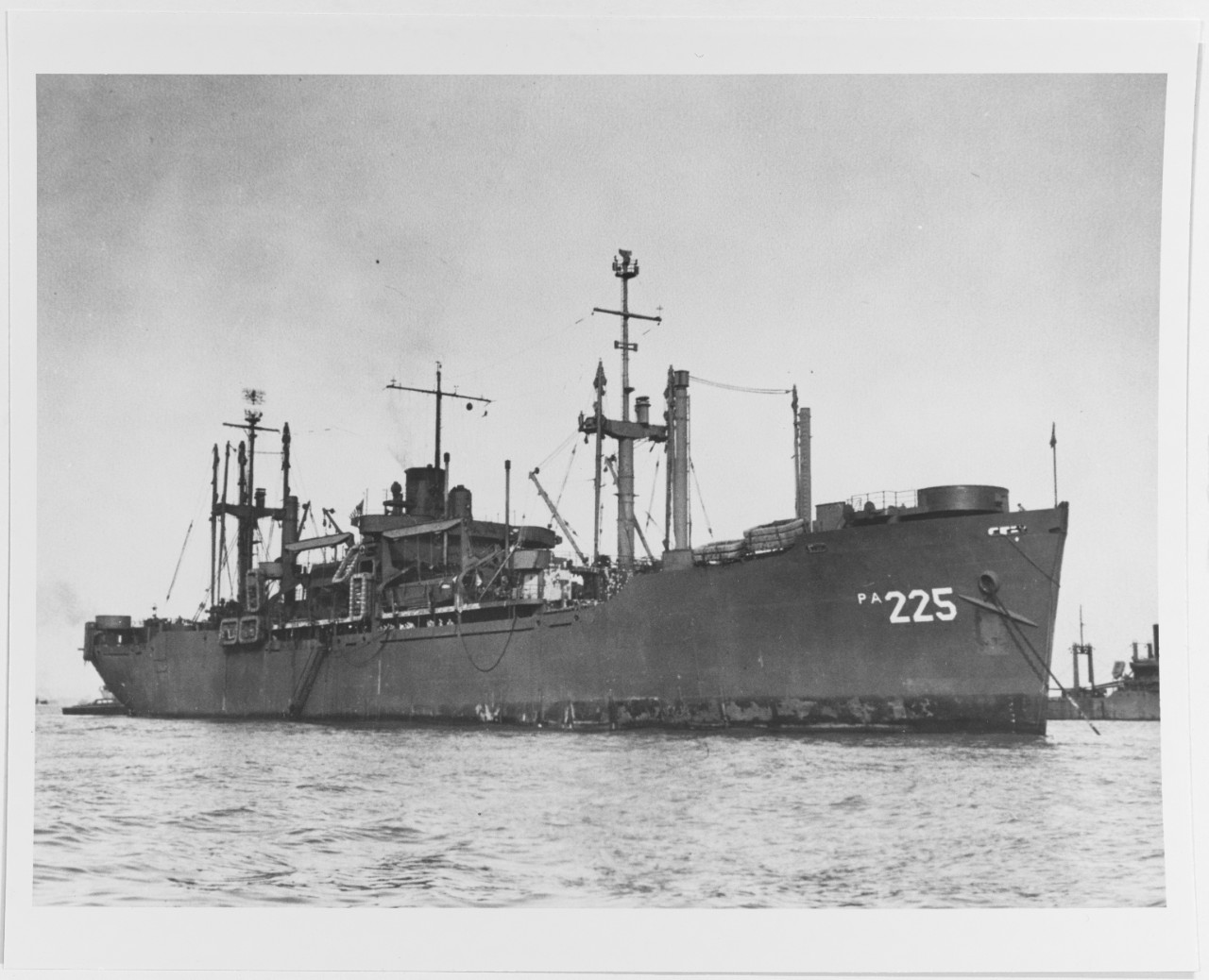
USS Bingham

Bingham was built by Permanente Metals Corporation. Her keel was laid on 20 September 1944. She was launched on 20 November and delivered on 23 December. Built for the United States Navy. To the USMC in 1946 and laid up in the James River. She was scrapped in 1983.

== Binghampton Victory ==
Binghampton Victory was built by Oregon Shipbuilding Corporation. Her keel was laid on 7 June 1945. She was launched on 28 July and delivered on 27 August. Built for the WSA, she was operated under the management of Shephard Steamship Co. Laid up in the Hudson River in 1948, she was later transferred to the James River. Sold in 1965 to Wilton Shipping Corp., New York and renamed Marathon Victory. She was scrapped at Kaohsiung in March 1970.

== Bland ==
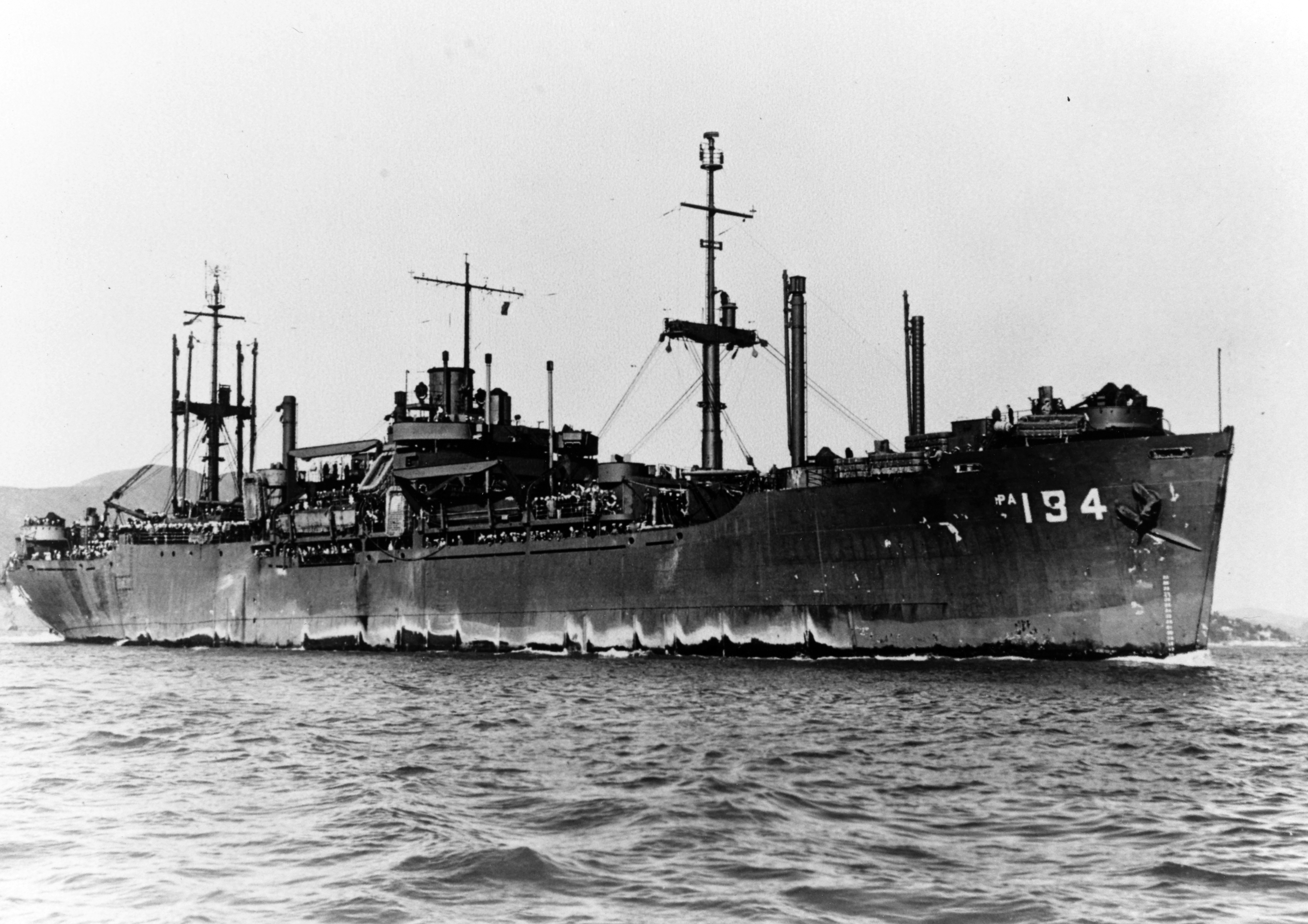
USS Bland

Bland was built by California Shipbuilding Corporation. Her keel was laid on 2 August 1944. She was launched on 26 October and delivered on 14 December. Built for the United States Navy. To the USMC in 1946 and laid up in the James River. She was scrapped at Brownsville in 1974.

== Bloomington Victory ==
Bloomington Victory was built by California Shipbuilding Corporation. Her keel was laid on 24 May 1945. She was launched on 21 July and delivered on 28 August. Built for the WSA, she was operated under the management of Moore-McCormack Lines. She was laid up at Wilmington, North Carolina in 1948. Later transferred to Mobile. She was scrapped at Panama City, Florida in March 1972.

== Bluefield Victory ==
Bluefield Victory was built by California Shipbuilding Corporation. Her keel was laid on 7 March 1944. She was launched on 9 May and delivered on 30 June. Built for the WSA, she was operated under the management of Mississippi Shipping Company. Laid up at Mobile in 1948. Sold in 1951 to Pacific Far East Line, San Francisco and renamed Alaska Bear. Sold in 1957 to Trans-Pacific Co., Philadelphia, Pennsylvania. Sold in 1960 to Long Island Tankers Corp., Wilmington, Delaware. Sold in 1962 to Pacific Far East Line. Sold in 1969 to Columbia Steamship Co., San Francisco and renamed Columbia Wolf for voyage to ship breakers. She was scrapped at Hong Kong in March 1970.

== Blue Island Victory ==
Blue Island Victory was a troop transport built by Bethlehem Fairfield Shipyard. Her keel was laid on 31 October 1944. She was launched on 28 December and delivered on 30 January 1945. Built for the WSA, she was operated under the management of Waterman Steamship Co. Converted to a livestock carrier by Todd Shipyards, Hoboken, New Jersey in 1946. She rammed the Drogden Lighthouse, Denmark on 2 December 1946 whilst on a voyage from the Hampton Roads, Virginia to Gdynia Poland and was severely damaged. Temporary repairs were made at Copenhagen, Denmark allowing her to complete sail to Gdańsk and discharge her cargo of 780 horses which the United Nations Relief and Rehabilitation Administration were donating to Poland. She then sailed to Bremen, West Germany for permanent repairs. Laid up at Wilmington, North Carolina in 1948. She was sold to Kaohsiung shipbreakers in May 1972, departing under tow of the Japanese tug Amaryllis in June, along with the Victory ship New Rochelle Victory.

== Blue Ridge Victory ==
Blue Ridge Victory was built by Bethlehem Fairfield Shipyard. Her keel was laid on 30 September 1944. She was launched on 20 November and delivered on 21 December. Built for the WSA, she was operated under the management of Calmar Steamship Company. Laid up in Suisun Bay in 1946, She was scrapped at Terminal Island in February 1971.

== Boise Victory ==
Boise Victory was built by Oregon Shipbuilding Corporation. Her keel was laid on 19 July 1945. She was launched on 17 October and delivered on 19 November. Built for the WSA, she was operated under the management of Coastwise Line. Sold in 1948 to States Steamship Co. and renamed Colorado. Sold in 1955 to Pacific-Atlantic Steamship Co., then sold back to States Steamship Co. in 1958. To United States Department of Commerce in 1961. Laid up at Astoria, Washington in 1962. Sold in 1966 to Charles Kurz & Co., Wilmington, Delaware and renamed Boise Victory. She was scrapped at Hong Kong in December 1969.

== Bollinger ==
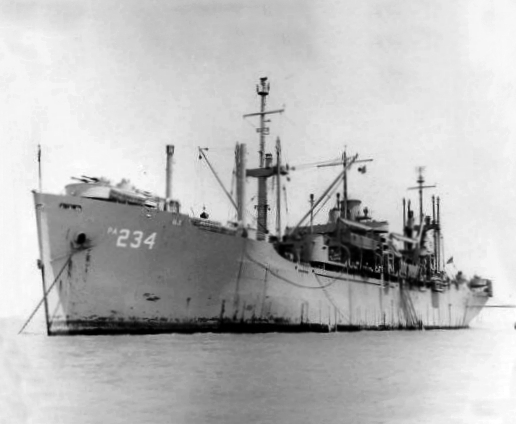
USS Bollinger

Bollinger was built by Kaiser Company. Her keel was laid on 7 October 1944. She was launched on 19 November and delivered on 9 December. Built for the United States Navy. To the USMC in 1947 and laid up in Suisun Bay. She was scrapped in 1982.

== Bosque ==
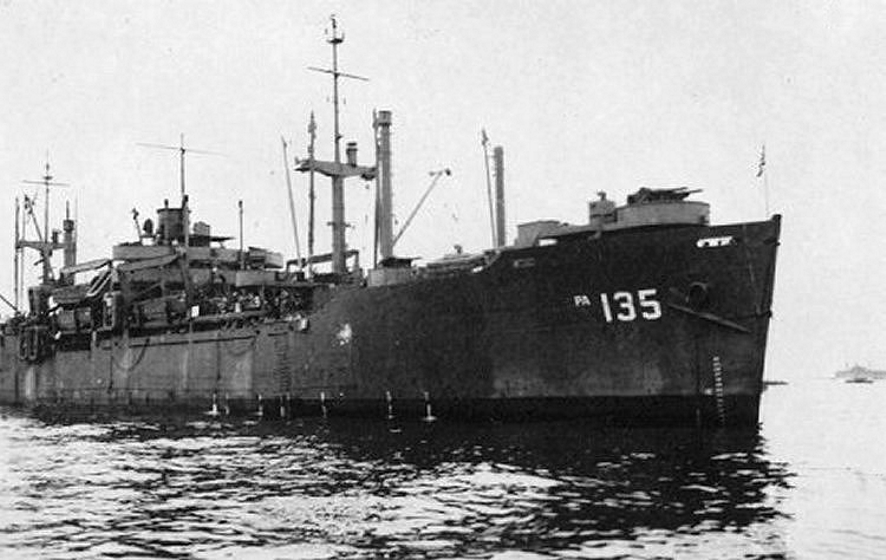
USS Bosque

Bosque was built by California Shipbuilding Corporation. Her keel was laid on 7 August 1944. She was launched on 28 October and delivered on 17 December. Built for the United States Navy. To the USMC in 1946. Laid up in the James River. She was sold to New York shipbreakers in April 1973.

== Botetourt ==
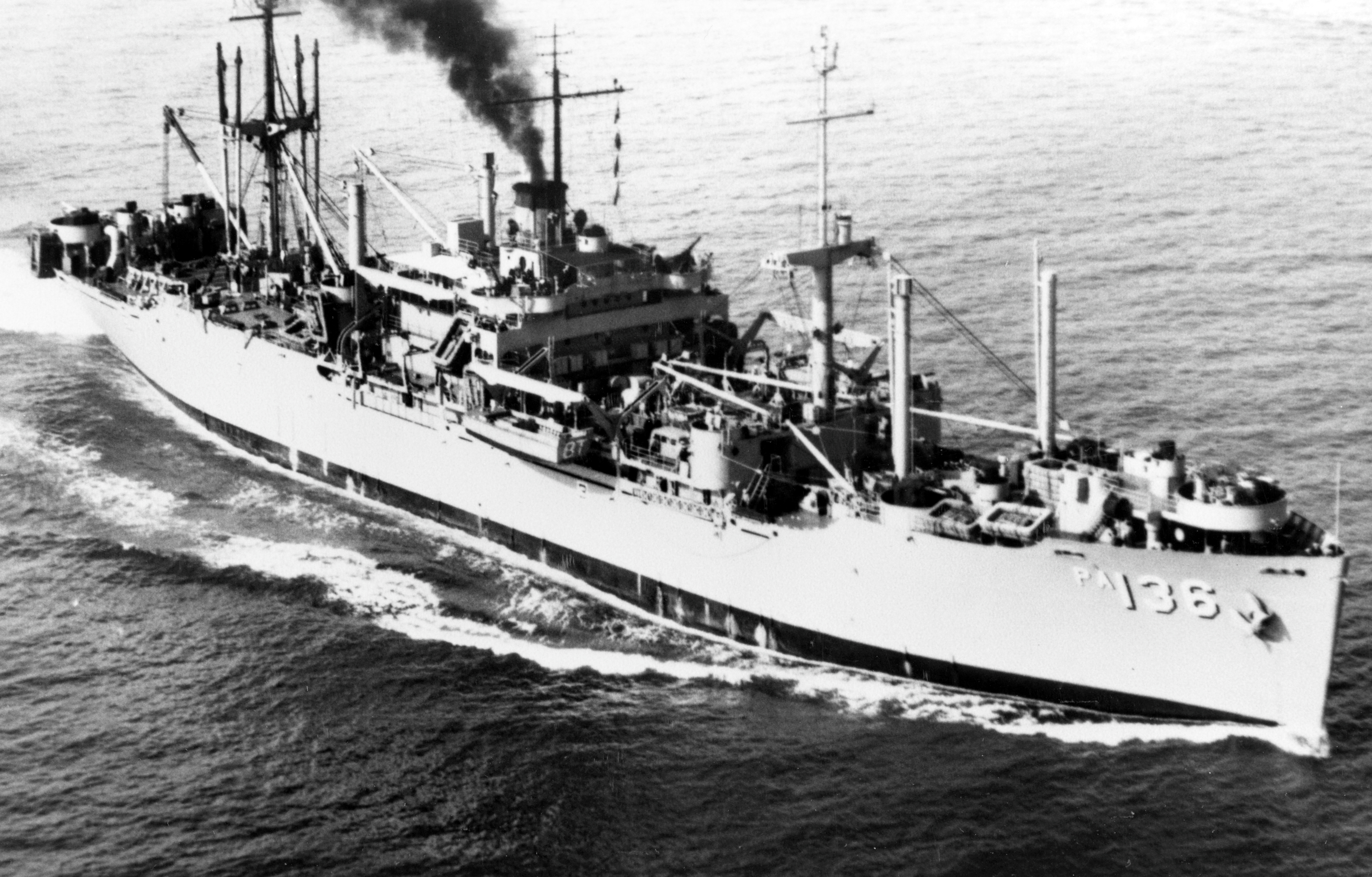
USS Botetourt

Botetourt was built by California Shipbuilding Corporation. Her keel was laid on 22 August 1944. She was launched on 19 October and delivered on 31 January 1945. Built for the United States Navy. Laid up in 1946, recommissioned in 1950. Laid up in 1956. To the United States Maritime Administration in 1960 and laid up in the James River. She was scrapped in 1974.

== Bottineau ==
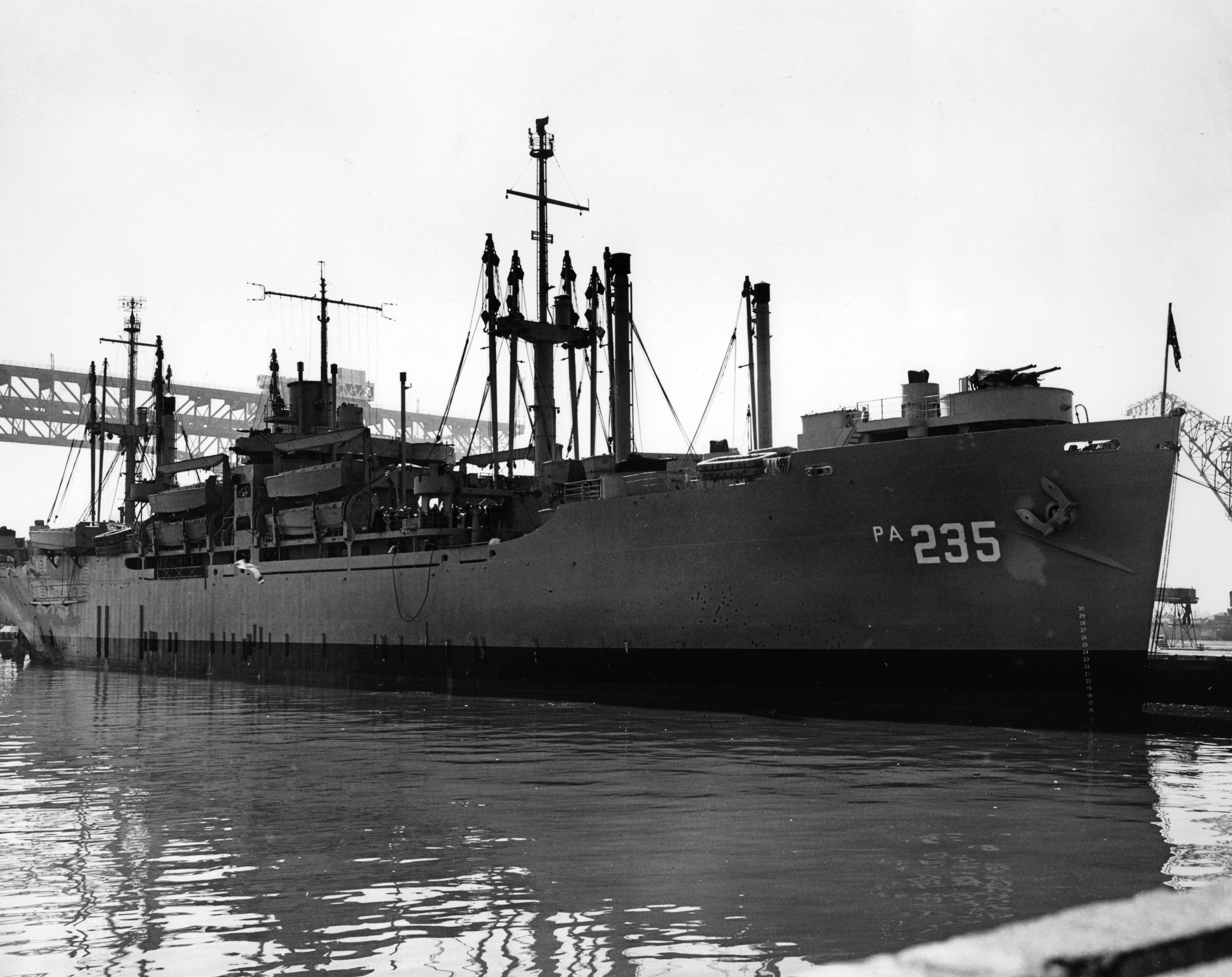
USS Bottineau

Bottineau was built by Kaiser Company. Her keel was laid on 11 October 1944. She was launched on 22 November and delivered on 30 December. Built for the United States Navy. To the USMC in 1947 and laid up in Suisun Bay. Recommissioned in 1951. Laid up in reserve at Philadelphia in 1955. To the United States Maritime Administration in 1960 and laid up in the James River. She was scrapped in 1983.

== Boulder Victory ==
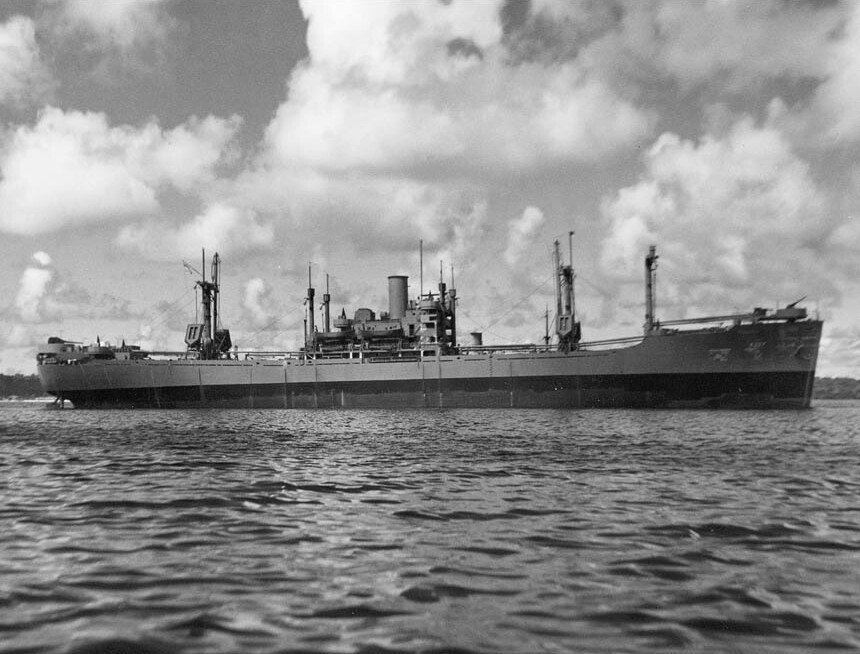
USS Boulder Victory

Boulder Victory was built by Permanente Metals Corporation. Her keel was laid on 18 June 1944. She was launched on 31 August and delivered on 12 October. Built for the United States Navy. To the USMC in 1946, laid up at Wilmington, Delaware. Later transferred to Suisun Bay. She was scrapped at Kaohsiung in 1984.

== Bowdoin Victory ==
Bowdoin Victory was built by Permanente Metals Corporation. Her keel was laid on 9 January 1945. She was launched on 24 February and delivered on 20 March. Built for the WSA, she was operated under the management of Interocean Steamship Company. She was laid up at Beaumont in 1949. Returned to service in 1966 due to the Vietnam War. Operated under the management of American Mail Line. Laid up in Suisun Bay in 1973. She was scrapped at Kaohsiung in 1984.

== Bowie ==
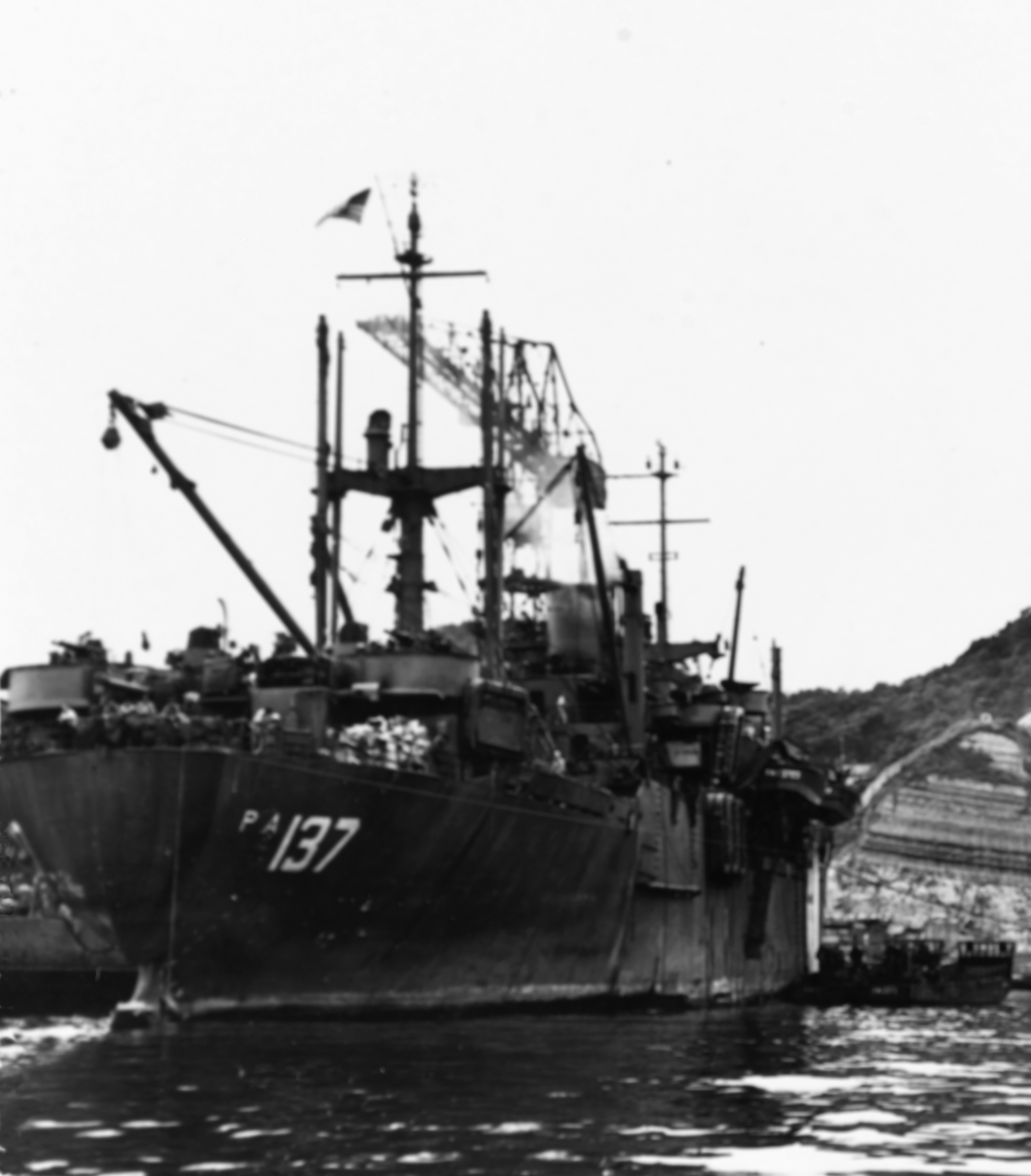
USS Bowie

Bowie was built by California Shipbuilding Corporation. Her keel was laid on 28 August 1944. She was launched on 31 October and delivered on 21 December. Built for the United States Navy. To the USMC in 1946 and laid up in the James River. She was sold to New York shipbreakers in April 1973.

== Bowling Green Victory ==
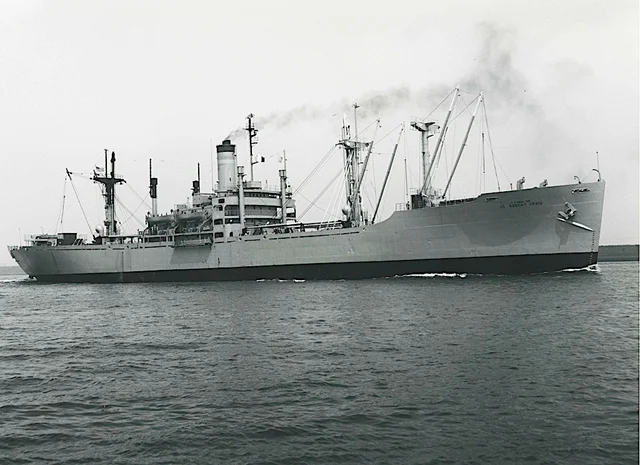
USNS Lt. Robert Craig

Bowling Green Victory was built by California Shipbuilding Corporation. Her keel was laid on 21 June 1945. She was launched on 28 August and delivered on 27 September. Built for the WSA, she was operated under the management of J. H. Winchester Co. To the United States Army Transportation Corps in 1947 and renamed Lt. Robert Craig. Laid up in the Hudson River in 1949. To the United States Navy in 1950. She was sold in 1973 to National Bulk Carriers Inc., New York for non-transport use.

== Bozeman Victory ==
Bozeman Victory was built by Oregon Shipbuilding Corporation. Her keel was laid on 3 November 1944. She was launched on 9 December and delivered on 17 February 1945. Built for the WSA, she was operated under the management of Alaska Steamship Co. Sold in 1946 to Compania Argentina de Navigation Dodero, Buenos Aires and renamed Campero. Sold in 1949 to Flota Argentina de Navigation de Ultramar, Buenos Aires. Sold in 1961 to Empresa Lineas Maritimas Argentinas, Buenos Aires. She was scrapped at Campana, Argentina in 1972.

== Brainerd Victory ==
Brainerd Victory was built by Oregon Shipbuilding Corporation. Her keel was laid on 25 July 1945. She was launched on 24 October and delivered on 23 November. Built for the WSA, she was operated under the management of Weyerhaeuser Steamship Company. Laid up in Suisun Bay in 1949. Sold in 1950 to Pope & Talbot, Inc., San Francisco and renamed P & T Voyager. Sold in 1962 to Sumner A. Long, New York and renamed Smith Voyager. Her cargo shifted and she developed a list 780 nautical miles (1,440 km) south east of Bermuda on 20 December 1964 whilst on a voyage from Houston to Bombay. She was abandoned the next day. She was taken in tow, but sank on 25 December. An enquiry found that she was overloaded by more than 1,300 tons.

== Brandon Victory ==
Brandon Victory was a troop transport built by Bethlehem Fairfield Shipyard. Her keel was laid on 24 February 1945. She was launched on 10 April and delivered on 9 May. Built for the WSA, she was operated under the management of Blidberg Rothchild Company. Laid up at Tacoma in 1946. She was scrapped at Tacoma in August 1972.

== Braxton ==
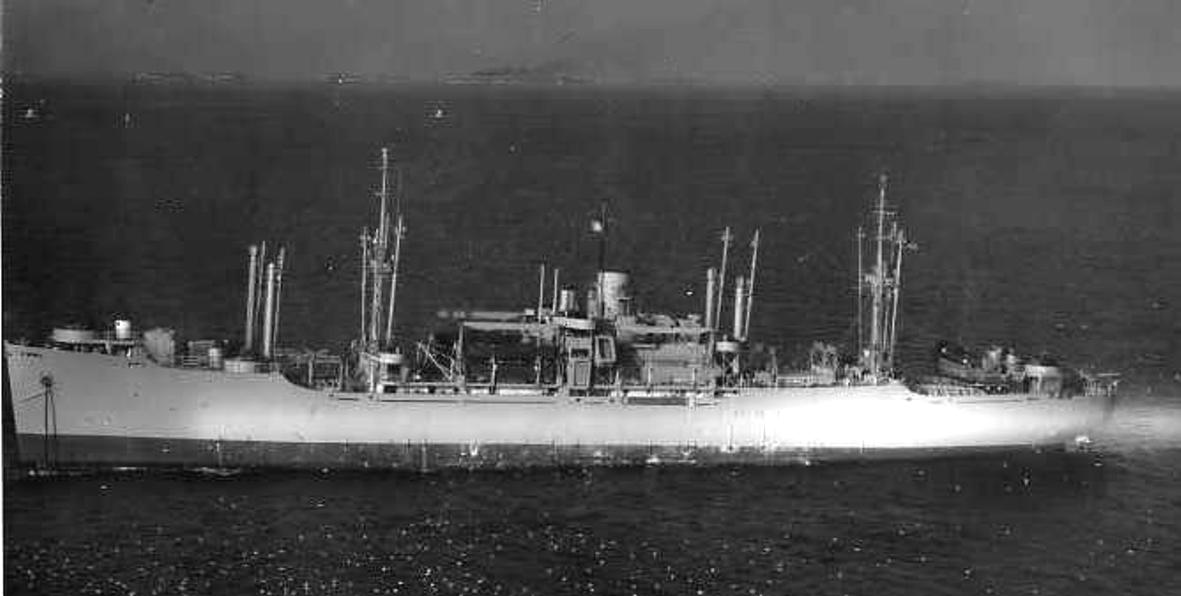
USS Braxton

Braxton was built by California Shipbuilding Corporation. Her keel was laid on 29 August 1944. She was launched on 3 November and delivered on 27 December. Built for the United States Navy. To the USMC in 1946 and laid up in the James River. She was sold to New York shipbreakers in April 1973.

== Brazil Victory ==
Brazil Victory was built by California Shipbuilding Corporation. Her keel was laid on 3 February 1944. She was launched on 30 March and delivered on 26 May. Built for the WSA, she was operated under the management of Mississippi Shipping Co. Laid up at Beaumont in 1946. Returned to service in 1966 due to the Vietnam War. Operated under the management of American President Lines. Laid up in Suisun Bay in 1973. She was scrapped at Huangpu, China in 1993.

== Brigham Victory ==
Brigham Victory was built by Permanente Metals Corporation. Her keel was laid on 6 November 1944. She was launched on 4 January 1945 and delivered on 31 January. Built for the WSA, she was operated under the management of Alcoa Steamship Co. Laid up at Wilmington, North Carolina in 1948, later transferred to the James River. She was scrapped at Recife, Brazil in 1987.

== Britain Victory ==
Britain Victory was built by Oregon Shipbuilding Corporation. Her keel was laid on 12 December 1943. She was launched on 4 February 1944 and delivered on 25 March. Built for the WSA, she was operated under the management of United States Lines. Laid up in Suisun Bay in 1948, she was later transferred to the James River. She was scrapped at Recife in 1987.

== Broadwater ==
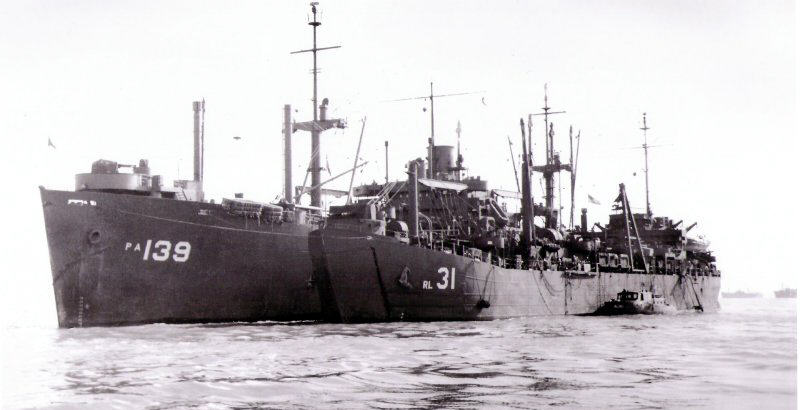
USS Broadwater and Bellerophon

Broadwater was built by California Shipbuilding Corporation. Her keel was laid on 1 September 1944. She was launched on 5 November and delivered on 31 December. Built for the United States Navy. To the USMC in 1946, laid up in the James River. She was scrapped at Brownsville in 1974.

== Bronx ==
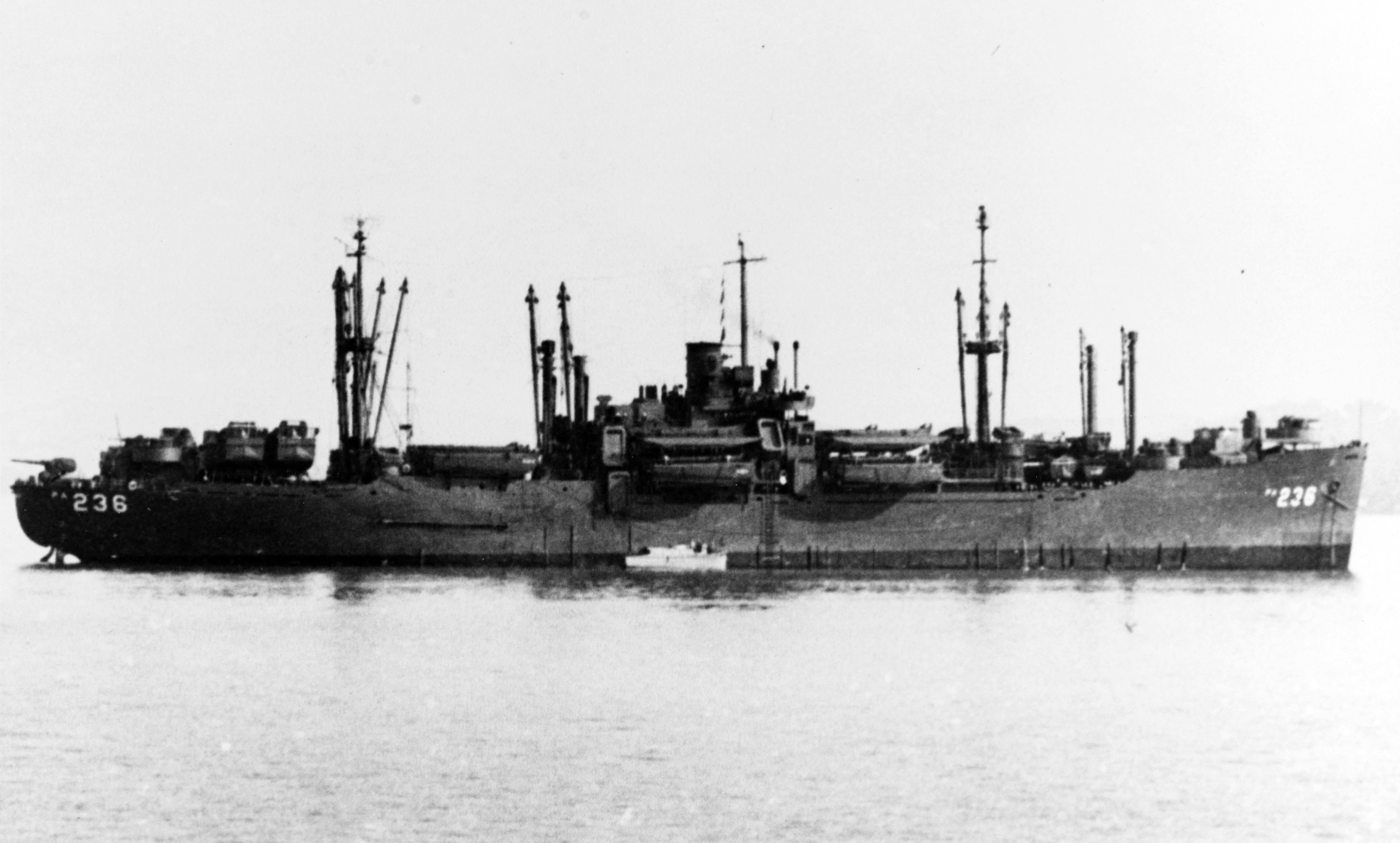
USS Bronx

Bronx was built by Oregon Shipbuilding Corporation. Her keel was laid on 22 May 1945. She was launched on 14 July and delivered on 27 August. Built for the United States Navy. Laid up in reserve in 1949. To the United States Maritime Administration in 1959 and laid up in Suisun Bay. She was scrapped in 1979.

== Brookings ==
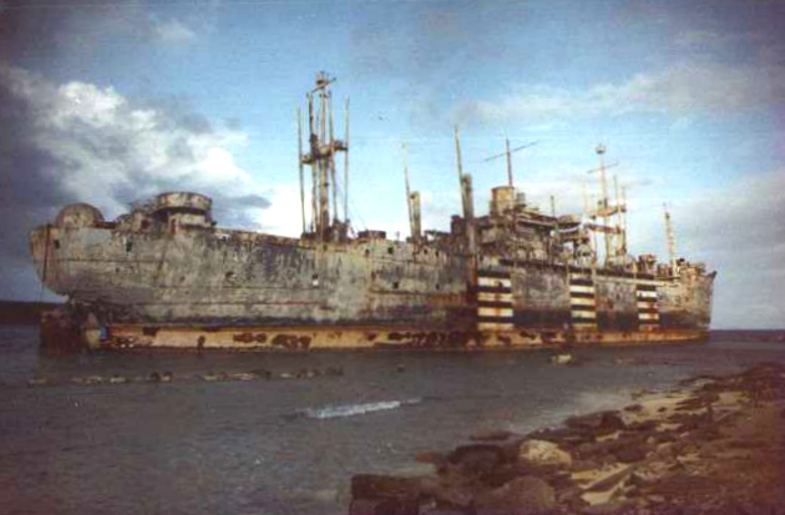
USS Brookings aground on Isla Cabras, Puerto Rico in September 1989.

Brookings was built by California Shipbuilding Corporation. Her keel was laid on 5 September 1944. She was launched on 20 November and delivered on 31 December. Built for the United States Navy. Laid up in reserve in 1946. To the United States Maritime Administration in 1959 and laid up in the James River. Withdrawn from reserve on 16 November 1987, towed to Puerto Rico for use as a target ship. She was driven ashore by Hurricane Hugo on 20 September 1989. Partially dismantled in situ, refloated on 28 March 1992. She was scuttled off Puerto Rico on 1 April 1992.

== Brown Victory ==
Brown Victory was built by Oregon Shipbuilding Corporation. Her keel was laid on 12 January 1945. She was launched on 23 February and delivered on 27 March. Built for the WSA, she was operated under the management of Alaska Packers. Sold in 1947 to Moore-McCormack Lines and renamed Mormacpine. She was scrapped at Kaohsiung in July 1970.

== Buckingham ==
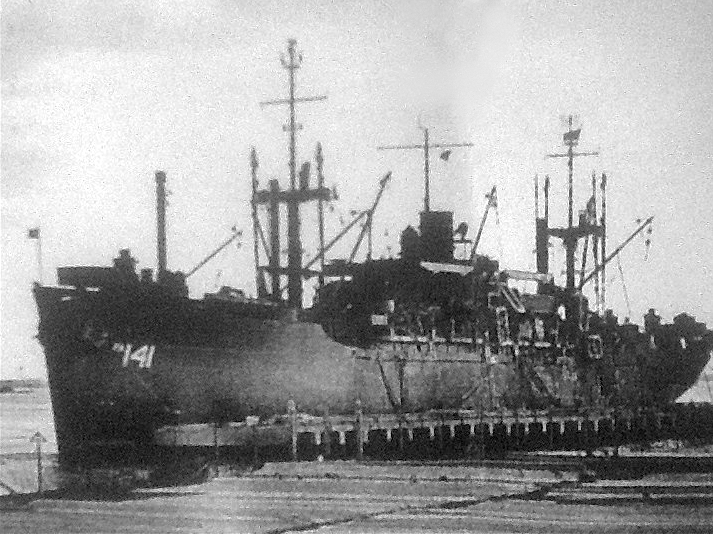
USS Buckingham

Buckingham was built by California Shipbuilding Corporation. Her keel was laid on 9 September 1944. She was launched on 13 November and delivered on 23 January 1945. Built for the United States Navy. Laid up in reserve in the James River in 1946. She was scrapped at Brownsville in 1974.

== Bucknell Victory ==
Bucknell Victory was built by Permanente Metals Corporation. Her keel was laid on 27 December 1944. She was launched on 10 February 1945 and delivered on 7 March. Built for the WSA, she was operated under the management of Agwilines Inc. Laid up in the James River in 1947. Returned to service in 1966 due to the Vietnam War. Operated under the management of American President Lines. Laid up in Suisun Bay in 1973. She was scrapped in China in 1994.

== Bucyrus Victory ==
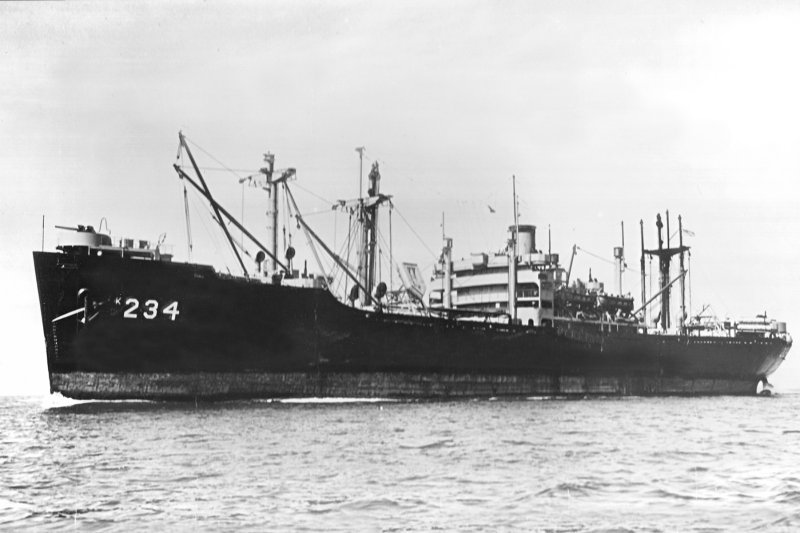
USS Bucyrus Victory

Bucyrus Victory was built by Permanente Metals Corporation. Her keel was laid on 1 September 1944. She was launched on 31 October and delivered on 29 November. Built for the United States Navy. To the USMC in 1946, laid up in Suisun Bay. Returned to service during the Korean War. Laid up at Astoria in 1953. Entered merchant service in 1966 due to the Vietnam War. Operated under the management of American President Lines. She caught fire at San Pedro, California on 15 August 1969 and was severely damaged. She was scrapped at Hong Kong in December 1969.

== Burbank Victory ==
Burbank Victory was built by Permanente Metals Corporation. Her keel was laid on 18 June 1945. She was launched on 28 July and delivered on 15 September. Built for the WSA, she was operated under the management of Sudden & Christenson. Laid up at Wilmington, Delaware in 1948. Returned to service in 1966 due to the Vietnam War. Laid up in the James River in 1973. She was scrapped at Gijón, Spain in 1986.
