= USS Bellerophon =

Achelous-class landing craft repair ship

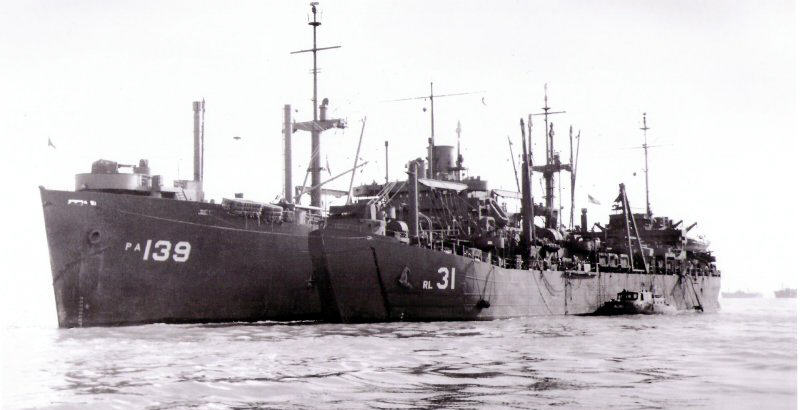
- Bellerophon alongside the USS Broadwater in San Francisco Bay.

History

United States
- Name: USS Bellerophon
- Builder: Chicago Bridge and Iron Company
- Laid down: 12 December 1944
- Launched: 7 March 1945
- Commissioned: 19 March 1945
- Decommissioned: September 1947
- Stricken: October 1977
- Fate: Sold for scrapping, 20 June 1980

General characteristics
- Class & type: Achelous class repair ship
- Displacement: 1,781 long tons (1,810 t) light; 3,960 long tons (4,024 t) full
- Length: 328 ft (100 m)
- Beam: 50 ft (15 m)
- Draft: 11 ft 2 in (3.40 m)
- Propulsion: 2 × General Motors 12-567 diesel engines, two shafts, twin rudders
- Speed: 12 knots (14 mph; 22 km/h)
- Complement: 255 officers and enlisted men
- Armament: 2 × 40 mm gun mounts; 8 × 20 mm gun mounts

USS Bellerophon (ARL-31) was one of 39 Achelous-class landing craft repair ships built for the United States Navy during World War II. Named for Bellerophon (a hero of Greek mythology), she was the only U.S. Naval vessel to bear the name.

Originally planned as an LST, she was redesignated as landing craft repair ship ARL-31 prior to construction. The ship was laid down on 12 December 1944 at Seneca, Illinois by the Chicago Bridge & Iron Company; launched on 7 March 1945; sponsored by Hazel Nitherspoon; and commissioned on 19 March 1945.

== Service history ==
On 21 March 1945 the ship sailed for Mobile, Alabama where she was placed out of commission on 31 March to be fitted out as a landing craft repair ship by the Alabama Drydock & Shipbuilding Company. The conversion was completed that summer, and USS Bellerophon (ARL-31) was recommissioned on 21 July 1945 at Mobile. On 31 July the ship began a fortnight's shakedown cruise that took her to Galveston, Texas. She returned to Mobile on 14 August and began preparations for an overseas deployment. On 1 September Bellerophon departed Mobile and headed for the Pacific Ocean. After transiting the Panama Canal, she headed up the west coast toward San Francisco. She made a stop at San Diego before arriving at Treasure Island on 3 October. There, the ship began duty as the repair ship for a newly formed boat pool. When a strike by civilian workers paralyzed civilian yards during the latter part of October, Bellerophon began making voyage repairs to Operation Magic Carpet ships while also carrying out some conversion work to enable attack cargo ships to serve as passenger carriers.

That work lasted until the spring of 1946. On 26 March 1946 she departed San Francisco bound for Hawaii. Upon her arrival in Pearl Harbor, she was assigned to the Commander, Amphibious Forces, Pacific Fleet, for duty repairing amphibious warfare ships. She concluded that assignment on 16 July and got underway to return to the west coast. The ship arrived in San Diego at the end of July and resumed repair work on amphibious ships. Bellerophon remained so engaged until placed out of commission at San Diego in September 1947. She remained in reserve, first at San Diego and later at Bremerton, Washington for the next three decades. Her name was struck from the Naval Vessel Register in October, 1977 and she was sold on 20 June 1980 to the Levin Metals Corporation of Richmond, California for scrapping.
