= USS Broadwater =

American Navy attack ship

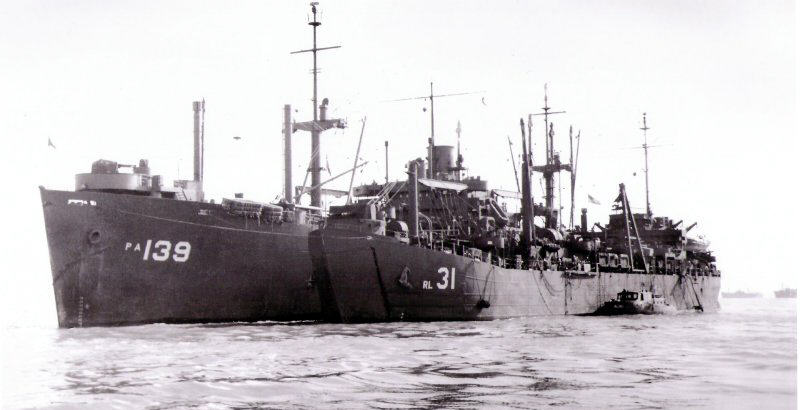
- Broadwater and Bellerophon (ARL-31) in San Francisco Bay, October 1945.

History

United States
- Name: USS Broadwater
- Namesake: Broadwater County, Montana
- Builder: California Shipbuilding Corporation, Wilmington, Los Angeles
- Laid down: 1 September 1944
- Launched: 5 November 1944
- Commissioned: 2 January 1945
- Decommissioned: 28 February 1946
- Stricken: 20 March 1946
- Fate: Sold for scrapping, 13 June 1974

General characteristics
- Class & type: Haskell-class attack transport
- Displacement: 6,873 long tons (6,983 t) light; 14,837 long tons (15,075 t) full
- Length: 455 ft (139 m)
- Beam: 62 ft (19 m)
- Draft: 24 ft (7.3 m)
- Propulsion: 1 × Joshua Hendy geared turbine; 2 × Babcock & Wilcox header-type boilers; 1 propeller
- Speed: 18 knots (33 km/h; 21 mph)
- Boats & landing craft carried: 12 × LCVPs; 2 × LCMs; 3 × LCPLs
- Capacity: 150,000 cubic feet, 2,900 tons
- Troops: 86 officers, 1,475 enlisted men
- Complement: 56 officers, 480 enlisted men
- Armament: 1 × 5"/38 caliber guns; 4 × twin 40 mm guns; 10 × single 20 mm guns

USS Broadwater (APA-139) was a Haskell-class attack transport in service with the United States Navy from 1945 to 1946. She was scrapped in 1974.

== History ==
Broadwater was laid down on 1 September 1944 at Wilmington, Los Angeles, by the California Shipbuilding Corporation under a Maritime Commission contract (MCV hull 55). She was launched on 5 November 1944, sponsored by Mrs. A. E. Florer, and delivered to the Navy on 31 December 1944. She was commissioned at Terminal Island, California on 2 January 1945. Named for Broadwater County, Montana, she was the only U.S. Naval vessel to bear the name.

=== Pacific War ===
After fitting out and underway tests, Broadwater began shakedown training out of San Pedro, Los Angeles on 12 January. On the 26th, she commenced amphibious training in the San Diego area. At the conclusion of that assignment on 12 February, the attack transport arrived at the Craig Shipbuilding in Long Beach, California for a post-shakedown availability. On 23 February she put to sea and, the following day, arrived in San Francisco. There, she loaded cargo until 2 March at which time the ship shaped a course for Hawaii. By the 8th, she was in Hawaiian waters conducting further amphibious training.

On 28 March she embarked elements of several construction battalions and, on the 29th, got underway from Pearl Harbor. On 6 and 7 April, Broadwater stopped at Eniwetok then continued west. She spent 13 to 15 April at Kossol Roads in the Palau Islands. On 17 April the attack transport anchored in Guiuan harbor at Samar in the Philippine Islands. She remained in the Samar-Leyte area for almost two weeks before getting underway for the Marianas on 30 April. The ship arrived at Apra Harbor, Guam on 4 May but put to sea again on the 7th. She arrived back in San Francisco on 22 May. After loading cargo and embarking passengers, Broadwater departed San Francisco on 29 May. She made stops at Eniwetok and Ulithi before arriving at Manila in the Philippines on 22 June. There, she unloaded cargo and disembarked troops. On 28 June, the ship stood out of Manila Bay bound for New Guinea. She arrived at Hollandia on the northern coast of New Guinea on 3 July and began taking on cargo and passengers. Departing Hollandia on 6 July, the attack cargo ship arrived back in Manila Bay on 10 July. After unloading cargo and disembarking passengers, Broadwater moved to Subic Bay on the 18th and began loading cargo. On 20 July, the ship set sail for the United States. She dropped anchor at San Pedro on 8 August.

After almost two weeks of voyage repairs at the California Shipbuilding Corporation, Broadwater began loading occupation troops on 24 August. She started across the Pacific on the 25th, made an overnight stop at Eniwetok on 7 and 8 September, and arrived in Manila on 15 September. Her passengers went ashore at Manila, and Broadwater got underway for Leyte. She reached San Pedro Bay on the 19th and stayed there until the 23rd. On the 24th, the attack transport anchored in Legaspi harbor, Luzon. She remained at Legaspi until 4 October when she weighed anchor for Japan. She arrived in Tokyo on the 13th. Later that month, the ship headed back to the United States, stopping at Guam on 27 October to embark the personnel of the U.S. Marine Twelfth 155mm Gun Battalion, arriving in early November 1945.

=== Decommissioning and fate ===
By late January 1946, Broadwater had moved to the east coast at Norfolk to prepare for inactivation. She was decommissioned on 28 February 1946 and was turned over to the Maritime Commission's War Shipping Administration for disposal on 1 March 1946. Her name was struck from the Naval Vessel Register on 20 March 1946 and she was berthed with the Maritime Commission's National Defense Reserve Fleet at James River, Virginia. She was sold for scrapping in late 1974 or early 1975.
