= USS Bergen =

WWII era American transport

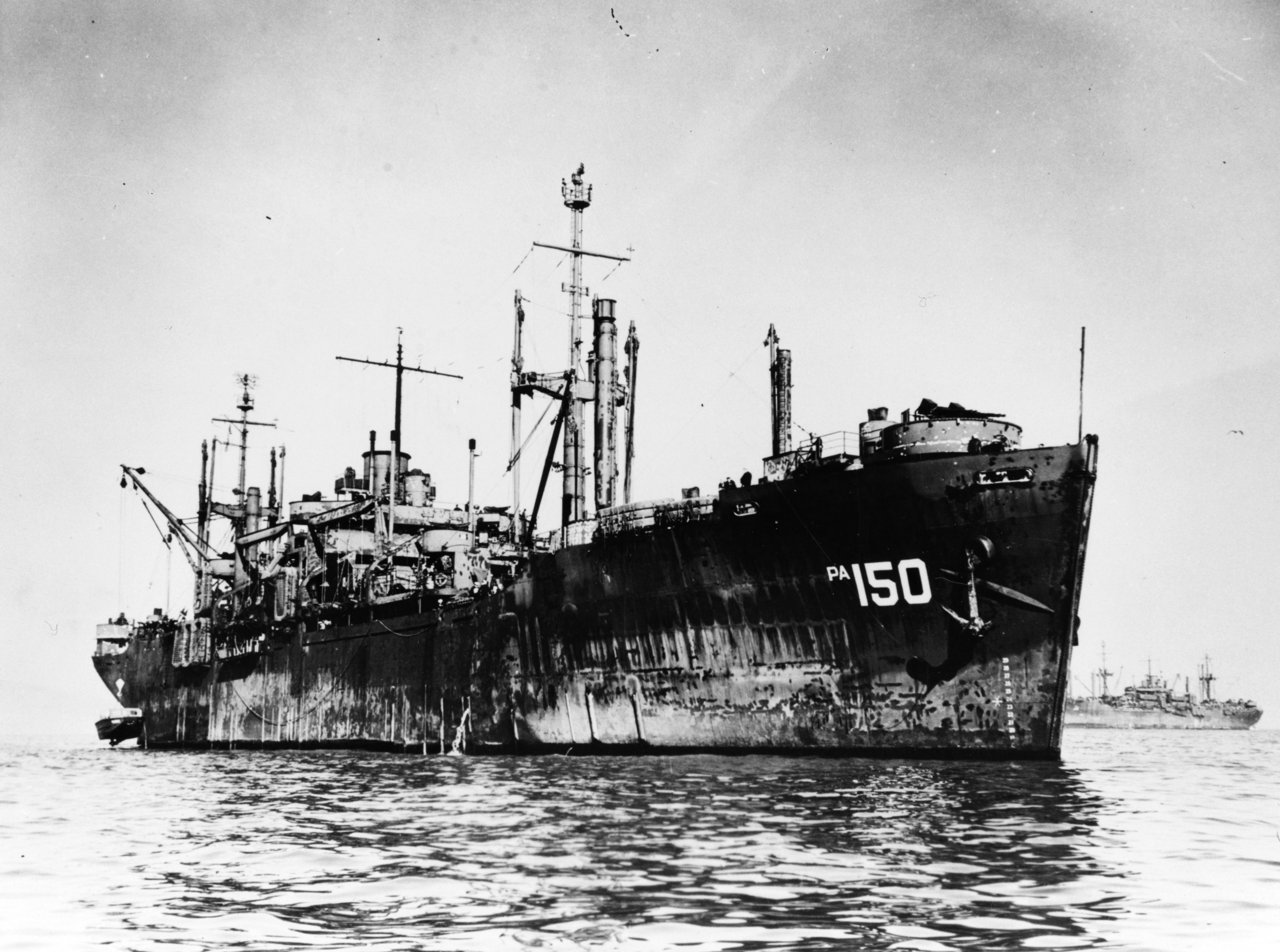

History

United States
- Name: Bergen
- Namesake: Bergen County, New Jersey
- Ordered: as type VC2-S-AP5; MCV hull 815
- Laid down: 25 October 1944
- Launched: 5 December 1944
- Acquired: 22 December 1944
- Commissioned: 23 December 1944
- Decommissioned: 24 April 1946
- Stricken: 8 May 1946
- Fate: Scrapped, 9 April 1973

General characteristics
- Displacement: 12,450 tons (full load)
- Length: 455 ft 0 in (138.68 m)
- Beam: 62 ft 0 in (18.90 m)
- Draught: 24 ft 0 in (7.32 m)
- Speed: 19 knots
- Complement: 536
- Armament: one 5 in (130 mm)/38 gun mount, twelve 40 mm gun mounts, ten 20 mm gun mounts

USS Bergen (APA-150) was a Haskell-class attack transport in service with the United States Navy from 1944 to 1946. She was scrapped in 1973.

== History ==
Bergen (APA 150) was laid down on 25 October 1944 at Vancouver, Washington, by the Kaiser Shipbuilding Co. under a Maritime Commission contract (MCV hull 815); launched on 5 December 1944; sponsored by Mrs. Donald Campbell; delivered to the Navy on 22 December 1944; and commissioned on 23 December 1944 at Astoria, Oregon.

=== World War II ===
After fitting out at Astoria and loading landing craft at San Francisco, California, Bergen reported at San Pedro, Los Angeles, in mid January 1945 for shakedown training. Shakedown and amphibious warfare training occupied her until 12 February. On the 13th, she began post shakedown availability at Terminal Island, California. The attack transport completed repairs on 23 February and, the next day, got underway for San Francisco. Between 25 February and 2 March, she loaded cargo, fuel, and provisions and took passengers on board. On 2 March, Bergen stood out of San Francisco Bay. She arrived in Pearl Harbor on 8 March, disembarked her passengers, and began unloading cargo. On the 25th, the ship moved to Honolulu and started loading cargo. On the 27th and 28th, officers and men of various U.S. Army units came on board.

Bergen put to sea on 29 March and set course for the Mariana Islands. En route, she suffered an engineering casualty that forced her to stop at Eniwetok from 6 to 9 April for repairs. She returned to sea on the 9th and arrived at Tanapag harbor, Saipan, on the 12th. After the troops went ashore, Bergen unloaded cargo and began taking hospital patients on board for evacuation to Hawaii. On 15 April, she cleared Tanapag and set course for Oahu. The attack transport entered Pearl Harbor on 25 April, disembarked the patients, and began repairs to her main propulsion plant. She completed repairs on 15 May, but remained in the Hawaiian Islands until the end of the month conducting trials and amphibious exercises. After embarking passengers, Bergen stood out of Honolulu on 30 May on her way back to the U.S. West Coast.

The attack transport moored at San Francisco on 5 June, and her passengers left the ship that same day. Bergen remained at San Francisco until 21 June when she got underway for Seattle, Washington. The ship stopped at Seattle between 24 and 27 June to load cargo. On the latter day, she headed back to Hawaii. She entered Honolulu on Independence Day 1945, and her passengers reported ashore. The attack transport unloaded cargo to make room for another cargo and new passengers. On 11 July, the ship set out for the western Pacific Ocean. After fueling and provisioning at Eniwetok, she arrived in Ulithi Atoll on 23 July. Bergen stayed there until 8 August when she exited the lagoon on her way to the Ryukyu Islands.

Her convoy reached the Hagushi anchorage off Okinawa on 12 August, and the attack transport dropped anchor to begin disembarking troops and unloading cargo. She witnessed several air raids over the next three days—the last three of the war. After the end to hostilities on 15 August, Bergen rode peacefully at anchor. On 26 August, she shifted berths to the Buckner Bay anchorage and, on the 30th, began loading cargo. The ship began embarking troops on 1 September and got underway for Korea on the 5th. Three days later, she entered port at Jinsen, Korea. She spent five days at Jinsen disembarking occupation troops and unloading their supplies and equipment.

On 13 September, Bergen stood out of Jinsen to return to Okinawa. She arrived at her destination on the 15th. Soon thereafter, the attack transport began embarking elements of the 7th Marines. On 26 September, she departed Okinawa and headed for northern China. The ship reached Taku, China, early in the morning of 30 September. She discharged both cargo and troops by 5 October and got underway for the Philippines. Bergen entered Manila Bay on 13 October and began taking on homeward-bound veterans there and at Subic Bay. She stood out of Subic Bay on 31 October and shaped a course for the United States. The attack transport arrived in San Francisco on 20 November, disembarked her passengers, and began much needed boiler repairs at Hunters Point, California. Bergen put to sea again on 7 December bound for the Philippines. On the 22nd, her destination was changed from Samar to Manila. She arrived there on the 29th and began embarking naval officers and enlisted men for passage back to the United States. On 3 January 1946, the ship moved to Subic Bay, took on more passengers, and then shaped a course for home.

=== Decommissioning and fate ===
Bergen entered Port Hueneme, California, on 24 January and dropped off most of her passengers. The remainder disembarked at San Pedro, Los Angeles, later that same day. She arrived in San Francisco on 29 January and began preparations for the long voyage to the U.S. East Coast. Bergen stood out of San Francisco Bay on 11 February. Her voyage took her through the Panama Canal, and she entered port at Norfolk, Virginia, on 2 March. The attack transport was decommissioned at Norfolk on 24 April 1946. Two days later, Bergen was returned to the United States Maritime Commission's War Shipping Administration. Her name was struck from the Navy list on 8 May 1946. She was berthed with the Maritime Commission's National Defense Reserve Fleet at James River, Virginia, until the spring of 1973. On 9 April 1973, she was sold to the Union Minerals & Alloys Corp., New York City, for scrapping.
