= USS Beckham =

Haskell-class US Navy attack transport

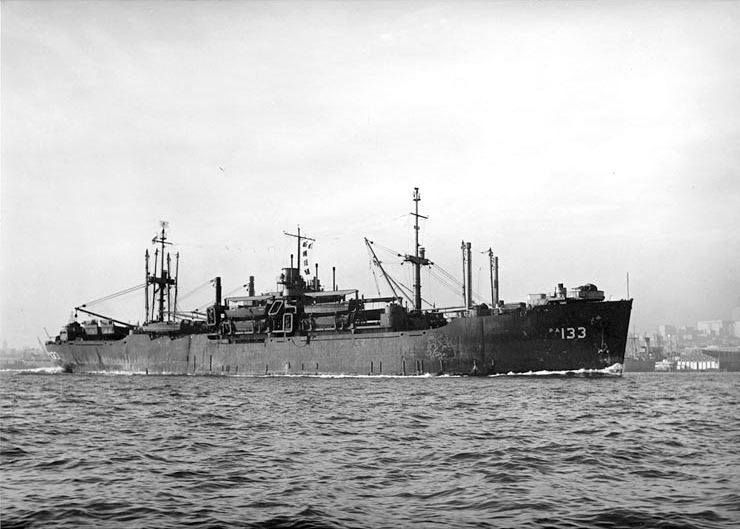

History

United States
- Name: USS Beckham
- Namesake: Beckham County, Oklahoma
- Builder: California Shipbuilding Corporation
- Laid down: 27 July 1944
- Launched: 14 October 1944
- Commissioned: 10 December 1944
- Decommissioned: 25 April 1946
- Stricken: 8 May 1946
- Fate: Sold for scrap, 5 September 1974

General characteristics
- Class & type: Haskell-class attack transport
- Displacement: 6,873 tons (lt), 14,837 t (fl)
- Length: 455 ft (139 m)
- Beam: 62 ft (19 m)
- Draft: 24 ft (7 m)
- Propulsion: 1 × geared turbine, 2 × header-type boilers, 1 × propeller, designed 8,500 shp (6,338 kW)
- Speed: 17 knots (31 km/h; 20 mph)
- Boats & landing craft carried: 2 × LCM; 12 × LCVP; 3 × LCPL
- Capacity: Troops: 86 officers, 1,475 enlisted; Cargo: 150,000 cu ft, 2,900 tons
- Complement: 56 officers, 480 enlisted
- Armament: 1 × 5"/38 dual-purpose gun; 4 × twin 40mm guns; 10 × single 20mm guns; late armament, add 1 × 40mm quad mount

USS Beckham (APA-133) was a Haskell-class attack transport in service with the United States Navy from 1944 to 1946. She was scrapped in 1974.

== History ==
Beckham (APA-133) was laid down on 27 July 1944 at San Pedro, California by the California Shipbuilding Co., under a Maritime Commission contract (MCV hull 49); launched on 14 October 1944; sponsored by Mrs. Frank J. Connolly of Los Angeles, California; and commissioned at San Pedro, California, on 10 December 1944.

On 18 December 1944, the attack transport commenced her shakedown in the San Pedro area and, on 3 January 1945, proceeded to San Diego, California. From 6 to 19 January, she carried out amphibious training in Coronado Roads, off San Clemente Island, and at Oceanside, California. After availability at San Pedro, Beckham shifted to the San Francisco, California, area, loaded cargo at Oakland, California, and got underway on 8 February for the Marshall Islands. The ship reached Eniwetok atoll on Washington' Birthday and—after discharging cargo for the U.S. Marine Corps garrison on Engebi Island—lingered there awaiting onward routing.

Assigned to Task Unit (TU) 12.6.2, Beckham departed Eniwetok on 2 March in a convoy bound for the Volcano Islands. At night her men could hear airplane engines as Boeing B 29 "Superfortresses" winged their way toward Japan to carry out some of the first massed raids on Tokyo. The convoy proceeded to, and then marked time in, a rendezvous area approximately 100 miles southeast of Iwo Jima.

On the night of the 13th, Beckham and her consorts moved into their assigned places off Iwo Jima. Beckham stood offshore, witnessing the 25th Marines' mop-up of the last pocket of enemy soldiers in an area studded by caves and emplacements. By 1030 on 16 March, Major General General Harry Schmidt (USMC), V Amphibious Corps commander, announced an end to "all organized resistance" on Iwo Jima. Crowded conditions off the island's east coast prompted Beckham to shift her anchorage a number of times before 18 March when she began taking on board elements of the 4th Marine Division. Underway on 20 March in convoy with task unit TU 51.29.2, Beckham headed for the Marianas. She reached Apra Harbor, Guam, on 22 March, transferred landing craft to the Pacific Amphibious Forces Replacement Boat Pool, and embarked additional marines. Pushing on via Eniwetok, the ship reached Pearl Harbor on 4 April.

After disembarking the marines at Kahului on Maui, she returned to Pearl Harbor on 7 April and devoted the next few days to ship's work and taking on fuel, water, and supplies. She got underway again on 20 April for a week of intensive amphibious exercises at Maalea Bay, Maui. Another few days back at Pearl Harbor followed, and then Beckham shifted to Honolulu harbor on the morning of 4 May. There, she embarked several Army units and sailed on 8 May for the Marshalls in convoy PD-399T.

Beckham fueled at Eniwetok before resuming her voyage on 20 May. Reaching Ulithi on 24 May, Beckham and her passengers awaited orders which finally came on 20 June. Underway that day, she headed for the Ryūkyūs in convoy WOK-27, arrived off Okinawa's Hagushi beachhead on the afternoon of 24 June, and commenced disembarking troops and unloading cargo.

Kamikaze attacks posed a serious threat to the "fleet that came to stay" as it supported the conquest of Okinawa. That evening, she went to general quarters and started her smoke generators as part of an effort to blanket the area with a chemical fog to conceal the fleet. The next night, Beckham again set Condition I watches; and, at 0030 on the 26th, a kamikaze crashed into the sea close aboard the amphibious command ship USS Auburn (AGC-10), 1,000 yards off Beckham's starboard beam.

Beckham weighed anchor on 28 June and joined convoy OKS-10, bound for the Marianas. Arriving at Saipan on 2 July, she disembarked casualties from Okinawa. Then, after taking on Army and Army Air Force men bound for Pearl Harbor, she got underway for Hawaii. After her escort was detached on the 10th, Beckham zig-zagged her way to Pearl Harbor where she arrived on the 13th. Shifting to Honolulu on the 23d, the attack transport embarked passengers and loaded cargo and stores before getting underway for Eniwetok on 26 July. Ending the first leg of this voyage to the western Pacific on 3 August, Beckham sailed with task unit TU 96.6.17 and reached Ulithi on the 8th. However, the end of the war in the Pacific overtook her in mid-August while she lay in the Western Carolines.

Underway for the Ryūkyūs on the 18th, Beckham joined convoy WOK-49 and reached Okinawa's Hagushi beaches on 22 August. She shifted to Buckner Bay on the 27th to fuel. Then, after proceeding via Hagushi to Naha, the attack transport sailed for Jinsen, Korea (formerly Chemulpo and later Inchon), on 5 September as part of amphibious convoy TU 78.1.15 under Vice Admiral Daniel E. Barbey, Commander, 7th Amphibious Force. The escort carrier USS Anzio (CVE-57) provided air cover. Elements of the Army's 7th Infantry Division and XXIV Corps were to carry out the landings.

Beckham anchored off Jinsen on 8 September and commenced unloading men and cargo on the 10th. Her landing craft (LCVP) not only took her cargo ashore, but brought back former Allied prisoners of war who had been incarcerated there, 138 Americans veterans of Bataan and 30 British, some of whom had been in captivity since the fall of Singapore in February 1942. Later, 150 British Army officers, also Singapore veterans, were discovered at Seoul and released.

Beckham sailed for Okinawa with task unit TU 78.12.5 on 13 September and dropped anchor off Hagushi on the 15th. The following morning, she put to sea to ride out a typhoon. Beckham fought her way out of the western anchorage through storm conditions, with torrential rains drastically limiting her visibility. She and her colleagues also encountered difficulties worse than the typhoon—stray mines not yet swept. The ship next to her struck a mine and had to be towed to port on the 18th after the storm had abated. Beckham again dropped anchor off Hagushi that day.

The attack transport got underway for the Philippines on 22 September and reached Guiuan Roadstead, off Samar, on the 25th. Underway again on 5 October, Beckham skirted another typhoon on the 7th. During her voyage she sighted six floating mines which USS Tinsman (DE-589) destroyed. At night, Beckham used her searchlights to spot drifting ordnance. The similarities between mines and the many large, rust-colored jellyfish which floated just below the surface of the water taxed her lookouts.

Anchoring in the Gulf of Bohai, China, on 14 October, Beckham discharged passengers and cargo for Tianjin before proceeding to the Shandong Peninsula. She disembarked the remainder of her passengers and unloaded cargo at Qingdao before sailing on the 27th. Beckham arrived at Manila on the morning of 3 November and sailed for San Francisco on the 6th with 1,970 passengers, a capacity load of military humanity that spilled into the cargo holds and onto the decks. Beckham refueled at Midway Island and entered the Golden Gate on 26 November. The attack transport then sailed for Hunters' Point for "minor repairs and reconditioning of underwater hull", repairs that continued into December.

Beckham then moved to San Francisco whence she transported veterans to San Pedro, California, for further routing to Separation Centers. Beckham got underway for the Philippines on 13 December. After brief stops at Midway and Saipan, the ship reached San Pedro Bay, Leyte, on 2 January 1946. Departing Samar on 7 January with another full load of returnees, she reached Seattle on the 26th. Troop disembarkation and brief repairs preceded the ship's sailing on 8 February for San Francisco. Reaching there on the 10th, Beckham then shifted to San Pedro, California, four days later.

=== Decommissioning and fate ===
Beckham commenced her last Navy voyage on 16 February 1946 when she sailed for Norfolk, Virginia. Transiting the Panama Canal on the 24th, she reached her destination on 7 March. Decommissioned at Norfolk on 25 April 1946, Beckham was turned over to the War Shipping Administration on 29 April 1946. Her name was struck from the Navy List on 8 May 1946, and she was berthed with the Maritime Commission's National Defense Reserve Fleet. The former attack transport remained inactive until sold on 5 September 1974 to Sparreboom Shipbrokers to be broken up for scrap.

== Awards ==
Beckham (APA-133) received two battle stars for her World War II service.
