= USS Barnwell =

1944 Haskell-class attack transport

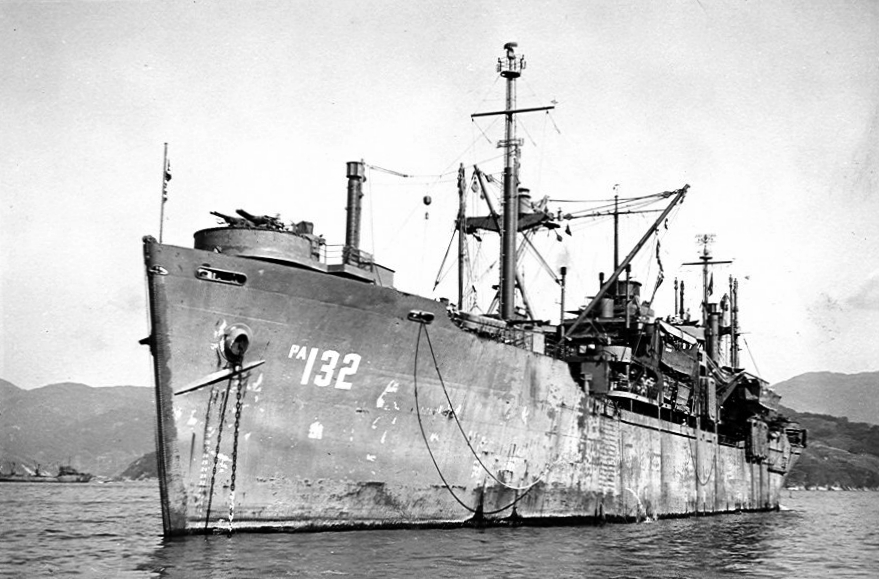

History

United States
- Name: USS Barnwell
- Namesake: Barnwell County, South Carolina
- Builder: California Shipbuilding
- Laid down: 25 July 1944
- Launched: 30 September 1944
- Commissioned: 19 January 1945
- Decommissioned: 1 February 1947
- Stricken: 1 October 1958
- Fate: Sunk as a target, 10 March 1986

General characteristics
- Class & type: Haskell-class attack transport
- Displacement: 6,873 tons (lt), 14,837 t (fl)
- Length: 455 ft (139 m)
- Beam: 62 ft (19 m)
- Draft: 24 ft (7 m)
- Propulsion: 1 × geared turbine, 2 × header-type boilers, 1 × propeller, designed 8,500 shp (6,338 kW)
- Speed: 17 knots (31 km/h; 20 mph)
- Boats & landing craft carried: 2 × LCM; 12 × LCVP; 3 × LCPL
- Capacity: Troops: 86 officers, 1,475 enlisted; Cargo: 150,000 cu ft, 2,900 tons
- Complement: 56 officers, 480 enlisted
- Armament: 1 × 5"/38 dual-purpose gun; 4 × twin 40mm guns; 10 × single 20mm guns; late armament, add 1 × 40mm quad mount

USS Barnwell (APA/LPA-132) was a Haskell-class attack transport in service with the United States Navy from 1945 to 1947. She was sunk as a target in 1986.

== History ==
Barnwell was of the VC2-S-AP5 Victory ship design type and was named for Barnwell County, South Carolina. She was laid down on 25 July 1944 at Wilmington, Los Angeles, by the California Shipbuilding Corp., under a United States Maritime Commission contract (MC hull 48); launched on 30 September 1944; and sponsored by Mrs. M. L. Rhodes; fitted out at Oakland, California, by the Moore Dry Dock Co.; and commissioned on 19 January 1945.

The attack transport spent the rest of the month getting ready for her shakedown by holding drills and taking on supplies. On 30 January, she stood out of San Francisco Bay and set course for San Pedro. There, shakedown training took up the first two weeks of February, and type training occupied the remainder. On 2 March, she put in at Terminal Island for a three-week post-shakedown availability. On 21 March, Barnwell got underway for San Diego where she embarked passengers and loaded cargo bound for Hawaii. She reached Pearl Harbor on 29 March and spent April conducting amphibious training in the islands.

Early in May, troops and cargo filled her spaces, and Barnwell left Oahu for the central Pacific on the 8th. She first stopped in the Marshall Islands then moved on to Guam to unload part of her cargo and to disembark some of her passengers, before delivering the remainder of both to Saipan. Next, she sailed to the Caroline Islands where she took troops on board at Ulithi for passage to Leyte. After stopping at Tacloban on Leyte, Barnwell transferred 23 landing craft to the boat pool at Samar and then headed back to the United States, carrying sailors and marines. Following a stop at Pearl Harbor en route, she disembarked her passengers and unloaded her cargo at San Francisco before starting voyage repairs.

At the work's conclusion, Barnwell embarked over 1,800 troops and took on a cargo of 15,000 mailbags. Underway on 14 July, Barnwell proceeded via Eniwetok and Ulithi to the Philippines. After delivering passengers and mail to both Guinan Harbor on Samar and Tacloban on Leyte, the attack transport sailed for the Admiralty Islands on 10 August. She reached Manus on the 14th and, while disembarking the rest of her troops there, received word of the war's end. Departing Manus on the 16th, she touched briefly at Ulithi before continuing on to New Caledonia. At Nouméa, she took on more cargo and embarked part of a Construction Battalion (or "Seabee"). Early in September, she picked up the rest of the "Seabees" and their gear at Espiritu Santo in the New Hebrides. From there, the attack transport set sail for the Philippines. At Lingayen, she embarked an Army medical unit bound for occupation duty in Japan. She then set sail for Sasebo on 20 September.

Barnwell made one more troop lift for the Army, a round-trip voyage from Japan to Lingayan and back, in October. Then, after touching at Kure and Hiroshima, Barnwell sailed to Guam, entering Apra Harbor on 30 October. Assigned to the "Magic Carpet" fleet on 23 October, Barnwell departed Guam with returning servicemen on the last day of October. Bound for San Francisco at first, she received orders diverting her to Seattle while en route, and Barnwell made that port on 12 November. For the remainder of 1945, she operated in coastwise service, visiting Seattle, Washington; Portland, Oregon; as well as San Francisco and San Pedro. Released from such tasks on 15 January 1946 by the arrival of USS American Legion (APA-17), Barnwell left California soon thereafter on her way to the east coast to be deactivated.

=== Fate ===
Placed in reserve at Norfolk, Virginia on 12 November 1946, Barnwell was decommissioned on 1 February 1947. Her name was struck from the Navy list on 1 October 1958. On 12 May 1959 she was berthed with the James River, Virginia contingent of the Maritime Administration's National Defense Reserve Fleet. The ship remained there for more than two decades, during which time she was redesignated LPA 132. At 1107 EDT, on 4 August 1982 she was withdrawn by the Navy from the Reserve Fleet for stripping and to be used as a target hulk. She was sunk as a target on 10 March 1986.
