= USS Bronx =

Haskell-class transport ship

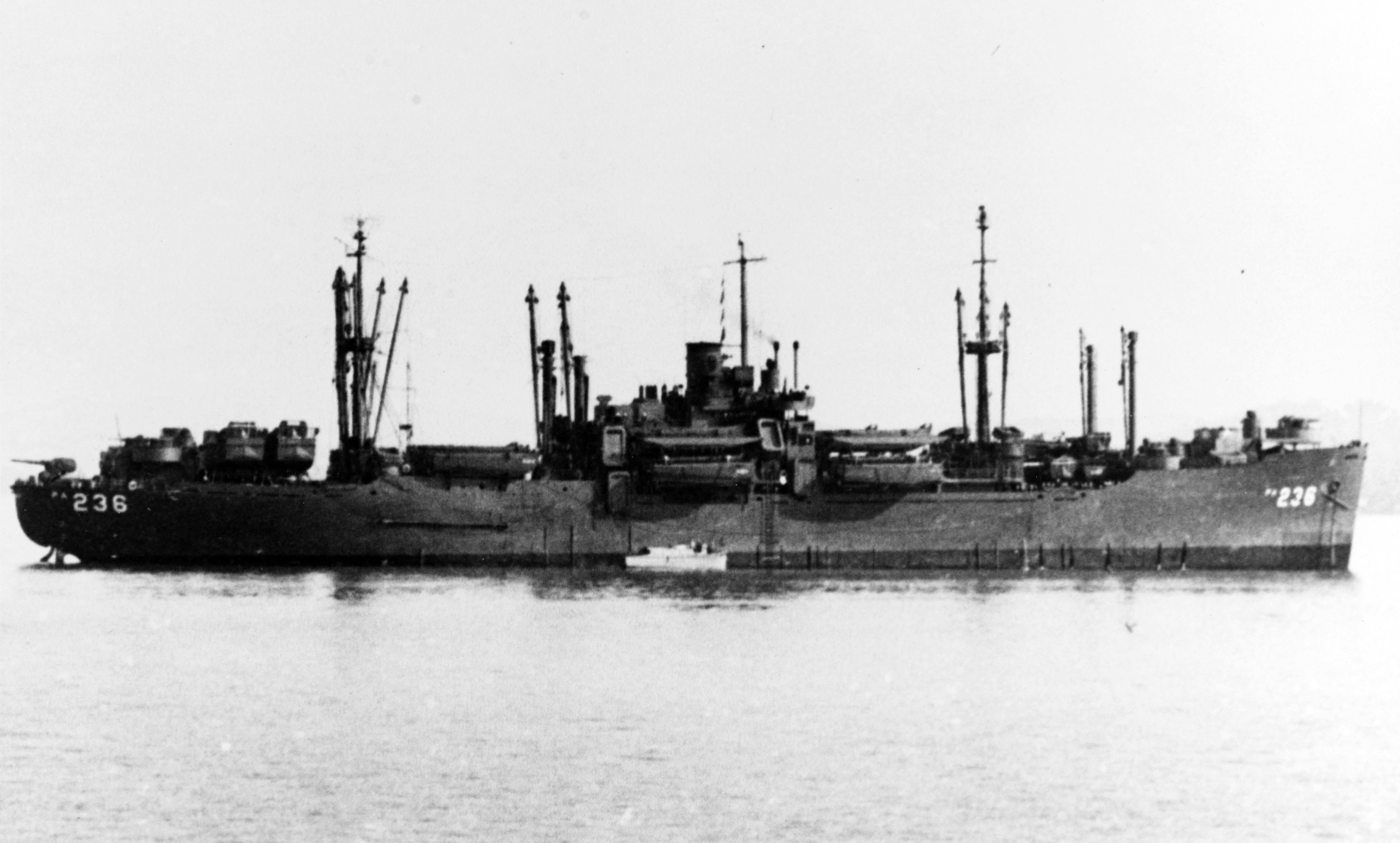

History

United States
- Name: USS Bronx (APA-236)
- Namesake: The Bronx
- Builder: Oregon Shipbuilding
- Launched: 14 July 1945
- Sponsored by: Mrs John W. Greenslade
- Acquired: 27 August 1945
- Commissioned: 27 August 1945
- Decommissioned: 30 June 1949
- Stricken: 1 October 1958
- Fate: Scrapped, 1979

General characteristics
- Class & type: Haskell-class attack transport
- Displacement: 6,720 tons (lt), 14,837 t. (fl)
- Length: 455 ft
- Beam: 62 ft
- Draft: 24 ft
- Propulsion: 1 x Joshua Hendy geared turbine, 2 x Babcock & Wilcox header-type boilers, 1 x propeller, designed shaft horsepower 8,500
- Speed: 17.7 knots
- Boats & landing craft carried: 2 x LCM, 12 x LCVP, 3 x LCPU
- Capacity: 86 Officers 1,475 Enlisted
- Crew: 56 Officers, 480 enlisted
- Armament: 1 x 5"/38 caliber dual-purpose gun mount, 1 x quad 40mm gun mount, 4 x twin 40mm gun mounts, 10 x single 20mm gun mounts
- Notes: MCV Hull No. 860, hull type VC2-S-AP5

USS Bronx (APA-236) was a Haskell-class attack transport in service with the United States Navy from 1945 to 1949. She was scrapped in 1979.

== History ==
Bronx was named after the Bronx, New York. She was launched 14 July 1945 by Oregon Shipbuilding Corporation of Portland, Oregon, under a Maritime Commission contract; sponsored by Mrs. John W. Greenslade, wife of Vice Admiral John W. Greenslade; acquired by the Navy 27 August 1945; and commissioned the same day.

Bronx got underway from San Pedro, Los Angeles, for Manila, Philippine Islands, 30 October 1945. At Manila she embarked Army personnel for the return trip to San Francisco. She returned to the Philippines in January and brought Naval personnel back to the West Coast. On 4 April 1946 she stood out for Shanghai, China. From here she steamed to Qingdao and Taku, China, where she embarked Marine and Naval personnel for transportation to San Francisco.

Bronx sailed to Buckner Bay, Okinawa, 7 June and received on board military personnel en route to San Francisco. During August she took part in training maneuvers near San Diego. On 28 September and again on 24 October, she departed carrying troops to Olympia, Washington.

She continued these coastwise operations until 9 January 1947 when she got underway for Pearl Harbor with troops. From there she proceeded to Okinawa, China, and Guam carrying passengers and cargo. The ship weighed anchor for San Francisco 22 May 1947. She then operated at various ports in California until January 1948.

On 5 January 1948 she set sail for Qingdao, China, via Pearl Harbor, transporting cargo. After stopping at Shanghai, she proceeded to Guam and then back to Qingdao.

Bronx got underway for San Francisco 4 May laden with cargo. She operated along the West Coast transporting men and supplies until 18 January 1949 when she steamed to Kodiak Island, Alaska, for landing exercises.

=== Decommissioning ===
On 18 February she departed for San Francisco with personnel and equipment. Upon arrival at San Francisco she commenced her pre-inactivation overhaul. Bronx was placed out of commission in reserve 30 June 1949. On 15 August 1958, she was transferred to the Maritime Administration and laid up in the National Defense Reserve Fleet, Suisun Bay. She was later redesignated an Amphibious Transport (LPA-236), on 1 January 1969. On 7 November 1979, she was withdrawn from the Reserve Fleet in exchange for the Santa Rita. Nominally delivered to States SS Co., Bronx was simultaneously transferred to Nissho-Iwai American Corp. for scrapping in Korea. As of April 2011, MARAD does not list any artifacts for the Bronx.
