= USS Brookings =

Haskell-class attack transport of the United States Navy

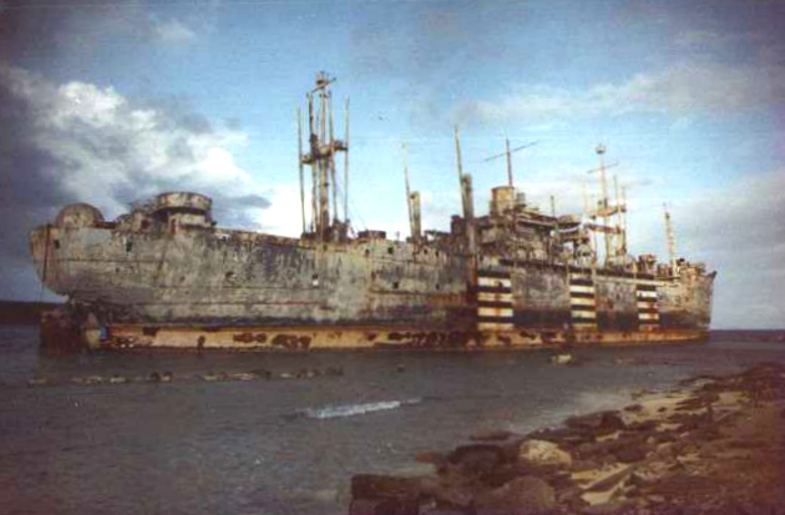
- Brookings having run aground in 1989

History

United States
- Name: USS Brookings
- Namesake: Brookings County, South Dakota
- Builder: California Shipbuilding Corporation
- Laid down: 5 September 1944
- Launched: 20 November 1944
- Commissioned: 6 January 1945
- Decommissioned: 25 July 1946
- Stricken: 1 October 1958
- Fate: Disposed of by partial dismantling and scuttling, 1 April 1992

General characteristics
- Class & type: Haskell-class attack transport
- Displacement: 6,873 tons (lt), 14,837 t (fl)
- Length: 455 ft (139 m)
- Beam: 62 ft (19 m)
- Draft: 24 ft (7 m)
- Propulsion: 1 × geared turbine, 2 × header-type boilers, 1 × propeller, designed 8,500 shp (6,338 kW)
- Speed: 17 knots (31 km/h; 20 mph)
- Boats & landing craft carried: 2 × LCM; 12 × LCVP; 3 × LCPL
- Capacity: Troops: 86 officers, 1,475 enlisted; Cargo: 150,000 cu ft, 2,900 tons
- Complement: 56 officers, 480 enlisted
- Armament: 1 × 5"/38 dual-purpose gun; 4 × twin 40mm guns; 10 × single 20mm guns; late armament, add 1 × 40mm quad mount

USS Brookings (APA-140) was a Haskell-class attack transport in service with the United States Navy from 1945 to 1946. She was scuttled in 1992.

== History ==
Brookings (APA-140) was laid down on 5 September 1944 at Wilmington, Los Angeles, by the California Shipbuilding Corp., under a United States Maritime Commission contract (MCV hull 24); launched on 20 November 1944; sponsored by Mrs. T. C. Johnson; and commissioned on 6 January 1945.

=== World War II ===
After conducting shakedown training, Brookings returned to San Pedro, Los Angeles, on 17 February for post-shakedown availability before proceeding to San Francisco, California, to load cargo. Sailing through the Golden Gate on 22 March 1945, Brookings steamed westward and reached Pearl Harbor with a cargo of ammunition on the 28th.

For the next four months, Brookings carried troops and cargo to such ports as Hilo and Pearl Harbor; the island of Guam; Ulithi, in the Carolines; Manus, in the Admiralty Islands; Hollandia, New Guinea; Manila, Philippine Islands; and the island of Leyte. The end of the war in mid-August found her sailing en route from Tacloban to Guam.

Brookings was then assigned to forces supporting the occupation of Japan, and she transported elements of the Army's 43d Division to the Tokyo-Yokohama area. The ship remained in Tokyo Bay between 7 and 13 September 1945. After returning to Guam soon thereafter and proceeding thence to Saipan, Brookings sailed for North China in October and landed elements of the 29th Regimental Combat Team of the 6th Marine Division at Qingdao. Assigned to Operation Magic Carpet on 15 November, the attack transport returned American servicemen from Jinsen, Korea, and Sasebo, Japan, to Seattle, Washington, in two voyages between late November 1945 and early March 1946.

=== Decommissioning ===
Departing San Francisco, California, on 3 April 1946, Brookings sailed for the U.S. East Coast, touching briefly at the Panama Canal Zone from 12 to 16 April before arriving at Norfolk, Virginia, on 21 April. Decommissioned at Norfolk on 25 July 1946, Brookings was laid up in the York River berthing area. Her name was struck from the Navy list on 1 October 1958, and the ship was transferred to the United States Maritime Commission. Moved to Wilmington, North Carolina, later in the year, she was berthed in the National Defense Reserve Fleet.

=== Shipwreck ===
Later shifted to the James River, Virginia, berthing area, she remained in the hands of the Maritime Administration until 16 November 1987 when she was returned to the Navy to be used as a non-destructive target.

Brookings was blown ashore at Roosevelt Roads, Puerto Rico by Hurricane Hugo in September 1989 prior to being sunk as a target by the US Navy. Attempts to refloat her failed and a contract was issued to Resolve Marine Group to remove her. Brookings was partially dismantled onsite from 5 January 1992 until 28 March 1992 when her remains were refloated. Her remains were scuttled off Puerto Rico on 1 April 1992.
