= USS Gear =

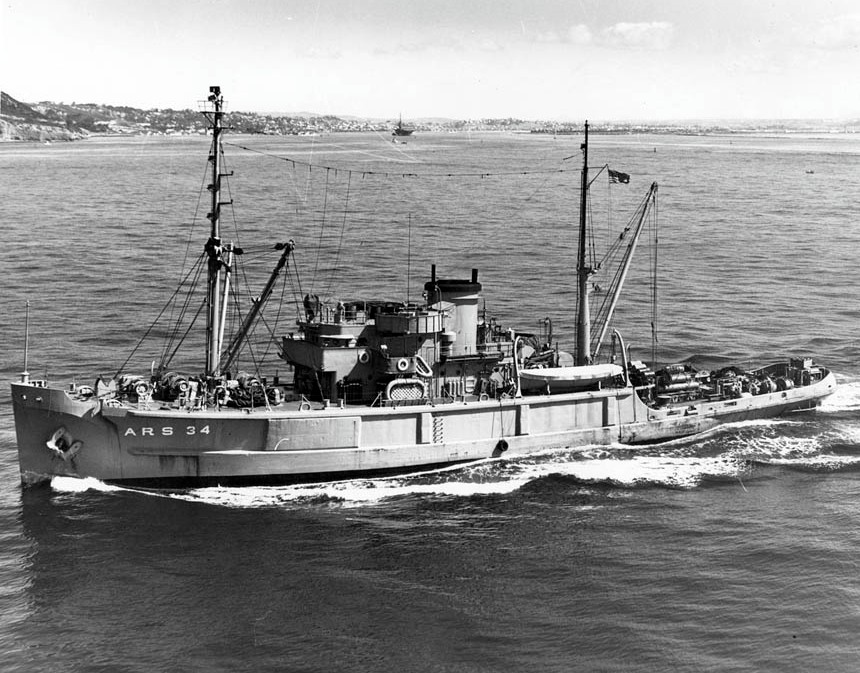
- Gear underway circa the late 1940s

History

United States
- Ordered: as HMS Pacific Salvor (BARS-4)
- Builder: Basalt Rock Company
- Laid down: date unknown
- Launched: 24 October 1942
- Acquired: 21 September 1942
- Commissioned: 24 September 1943
- Decommissioned: 13 December 1946
- In service: 24 February 1953
- Out of service: date unknown
- Stricken: 30 April 1981
- Fate: Sold for scrapping, 1 July 1982

General characteristics
- Tonnage: 1,441 tons
- Displacement: 1,630 tons
- Length: 213 ft 6 in (65.07 m)
- Beam: 39 ft (12 m)
- Draught: 14 ft 4 in (4.37 m)
- Propulsion: diesel-electric, twin screws, 2,780 hp
- Speed: 15 knots (28 km/h)
- Complement: 120
- Armament: four 40 mm guns, four 0.5 in (12.7 mm) machine guns

USS Gear (ARS-34) was a Diver-class rescue and salvage ship acquired by the U.S. Navy during World War II. Her task was to come to the aid of stricken vessels.

Gear (BARS-4), originally intended for the Royal Navy under terms of the Lend-Lease Program, was launched as HMS Pacific Salvor (BARS-4) on 24 October 1942 by the Basalt Rock Company in Napa, California; acquired by the U.S. Navy and designated Gear (ARS-34) on 21 September 1942; and commissioned 24 September 1943.

== World War II service ==
Gear departed San Diego, California, on 6 December 1943 en route via Pearl Harbor and the Gilbert Islands to Eniwetok atoll in, the Marshall Islands. Here she performed salvage, towing, and repair for ships of the fleet as a unit of Service Squadron 10 until 17 July 1944.

=== Support operations at Saipan and Tinian ===
She provided similar services at Saipan (25 July – 7 August), shifting to Apra Harbor, Guam, on 8 August 1944 for various operations that included the towing and sinking of concrete barges on Calalan Bank to serve as a breakwater; pulling amphibious landing ships off various beaches: and towing a ship to Tinian and Saipan before return. She returned to Pearl Harbor from the Marianas on 6 December 1944 for overhaul, and departed on 29 January 1945 with an amphibious assault force bound for Iwo Jima.

=== Iwo Jima operations ===
Gear arrived in the outer transport area of Iwo Jima on 19 February 1945 to witness the landing of U.S. Marines under cover of intensive Naval gunfire and air attack. She proved invaluable in assisting the ships of the fleet, pumping out flooded spaces, repairing mortars, making ship repairs and performing various towing assignments. She returned to Saipan on 5 March with an LSM and two LCI's in tow.

=== Okinawa operations ===
Four days later she was en route with a transport assault force that arrived off Okinawa on 1 April, D-day of invasion. Subsequently, she assisted with battle damage repairs on various ships. On April 2 and 3, she assisted USS Alpine APA-92 which had been hit by a Kamikazi and its bomb the evening of April 1. She also assisted Wichita (CA-45), England (DE-635), Aaron Ward (DD-483) and Ingraham (DD-694). She departed Okinawa on 15 May for repair service at Ulithi (21 May – 12 June), then proceeded via Eniwetok with two tank landing ships in tow for Pearl Harbor, arriving 6 July 1945.

== Alaskan Sea Frontier service ==
Gear departed Pearl Harbor on 11 July and arrived at Portland, Oregon on the 20th. After voyage repairs, she performed towing and salvage for the Alaskan Sea Frontier at Adak, Alaska, until 6 May 1946, returning to San Pedro, California, on the 23d for services there until decommissioned on 13 December 1946.

== Reactivation with a civilian crew ==
Gear was assigned to the San Diego Group, U.S. Pacific Reserve Fleet until 24 February 1953. A civilian crew of the Merritt Chapman Scott Corp. then operated her for Navy towing and salvage service at San Pedro, California. Under contract to the Merritt Chapman Scott Corp., she continued Navy salvage and repair duties at San Pedro with occasional coast towing.

== Final disposition ==
Gear was returned to U.S. Navy custody (date unknown) and struck from the Naval Register, 30 April 1981. Final Disposition: she was sold for scrapping, 1 July 1982, by the Defense Reutilization and Marketing Service.

== Military awards and honors ==
Gear won several battle stars during World War II:

- Iwo Jima operation
- Okinawa Gunto operation

Her crew was eligible for the following medals:

- American Campaign Medal
- Asiatic-Pacific Campaign Medal (2)
- World War II Victory Medal
