= USS Clamp =

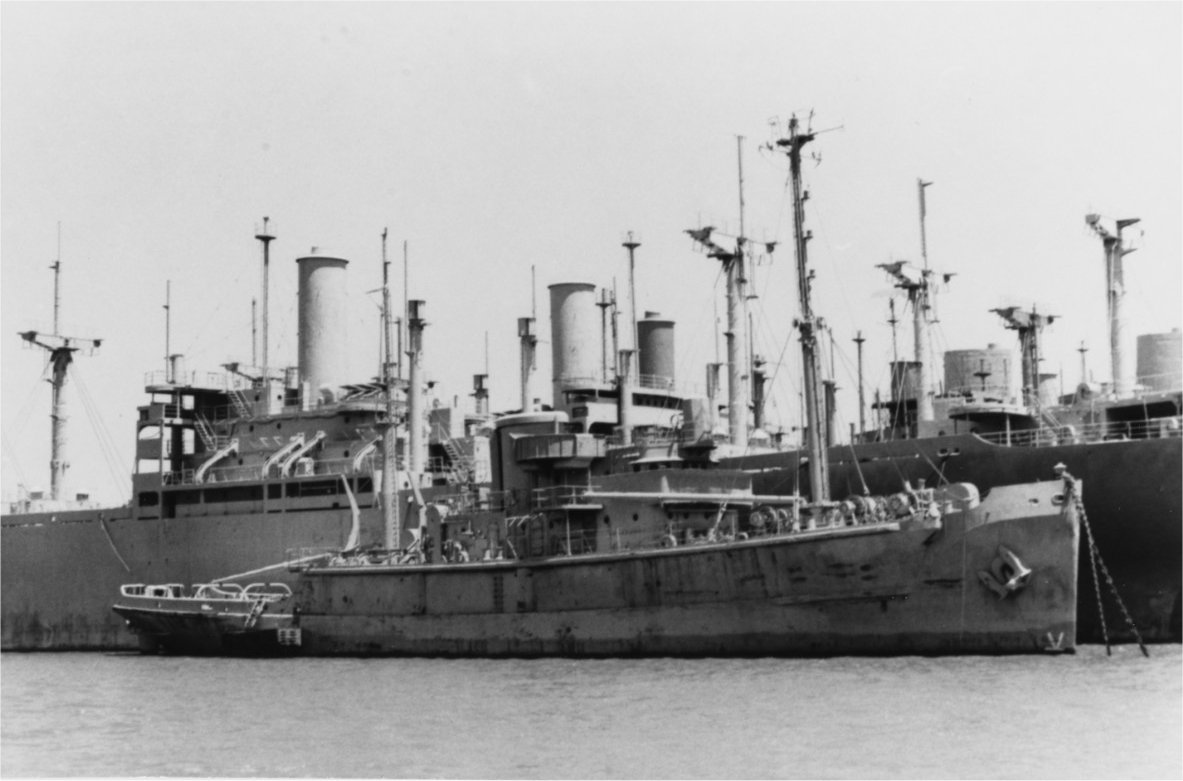
- Ex-USS Clamp laid up in reserve at Suisun Bay, 8 July 1980

History

United States
- Name: Clamp
- Ordered: as HMS Atlantic Salvor (BARS-3)
- Builder: Basalt Rock Company
- Laid down: 3 February 1942
- Launched: 24 October 1942
- Commissioned: 23 August 1943
- Decommissioned: 6 May 1947
- Stricken: 1 July 1973
- Fate: Contracted for Scrapping 12 April 2011 to Marine Metals, Brownsville, Tx.

General characteristics
- Class & type: Diver-class rescue and salvage ship
- Tonnage: 1,441 tons
- Displacement: 1,630 tons
- Length: 213 ft 6 in (65.07 m)
- Beam: 39 ft (12 m)
- Draft: 14 ft 4 in (4.37 m)
- Propulsion: diesel-electric, twin screws, 2,780 hp
- Speed: 15 knots (28 km/h)
- Complement: 120
- Armament: 4 x 40 mm guns; 4 x four 0.5 in (12.7 mm) machine guns

USS Clamp (ARS-33) was a Diver-class rescue and salvage ship acquired by the U.S. Navy during World War II. Her task was to come to the aid of stricken vessels.

Clamp was launched on 24 October 1942 by Basalt Rock Company in Napa, California, under a Maritime Commission contract. The vessel was commissioned on 23 August 1943.

== World War II service ==
Clamp sailed from San Pedro, California, 30 September 1943 and after a brief period at Pearl Harbor, arrived at Funafuti, Ellice Islands, 8 November. From this base she conducted combat salvage operations supporting the Gilbert Islands invasion.

=== Under constant attack ===
On 10 November Clamp had a busy day as she came under air attack five different times. The enemy was driven off and Clamp sustained no damage. She conducted salvage operations on LST-34, and assisted the destroyer Hoel off Betio Point, 2 December. Departing Funafuti 12 January 1944 for Midway Island, she conducted salvage operations on Macaw from 24 January to 17 February, then returned to Pearl Harbor for overhaul.

=== Capturing Japanese prisoners ===
Clamp began working in the Marshalls on salvage and cargo duty in April 1944. She investigated sunken Japanese vessels for salvage value off Saipan in July, capturing 10 prisoners during this work. She also salvaged LST-34 aground off Tinian, in August, returning to Pearl Harbor for overhaul in November.

=== Iwo Jima and Okinawa operations ===
Clamp arrived at Iwo Jima 19 February 1945 and until 2 March was engaged in salvage work during the invasion and capture of that island. Sailing to Leyte via Saipan, Guam, and Ulithi, she joined the salvage and repair group which cleared 21 March for the invasion of Okinawa. Based at Kerama Retto from 26 March to 15 May, Clamp gave emergency aid to the cruiser Indianapolis, a kamikaze victim, from 31 March to 5 April. She steamed to Ie Shima 12 May to inspect damage to two destroyers.

== Support nuclear testing operations ==
Clamp was overhauled on the west coast until 5 November 1945 when she sailed for Pearl Harbor. She remained there until 6 March 1946, put out for Bikini Atoll where she had towing, diving, and demolition duties in connection with Operation Crossroads. She returned to Pearl Harbor 16 September, and to San Francisco, California, 22 October.

== Post-war decommissioning ==
Clamp was placed out of commission in reserve at San Pedro, California, 6 May 1947. Clamp was struck from the Naval Vessel Register, 1 July 1973 and her title transfer to MARAD, 1 February 1999. On 12 April 2011, a contract was issued by MARAD to Marine Metals of Brownsville, Texas to dismantle Clamp for $462,223.31. Clamp departed the Suisun Bay Reserve Fleet on 23 May 2011 to be cleaned at BAE Systems San Francisco Ship Repair. Clamp was towed to Brownsville upon completion of the cleaning and is currently undergoing scrapping.

== Military awards and honors ==
Clamp received four battle stars for World War II service. Her crew was eligible for the following medals and ribbons:

- Combat Action Ribbon (retroactive)
- American Campaign Medal
- Asiatic-Pacific Campaign Medal (4)
- World War II Victory Medal

== Current status ==
As of January 2011, Clamp is laid up in the National Defense Reserve Fleet in Suisun Bay, Benicia, California. Clamp was mentioned in a newspaper article published on 11 February 2008 concerning the status of sister ship USS Bolster.
