= Diver-class rescue and salvage ship =

Class of rescue and salvage ships

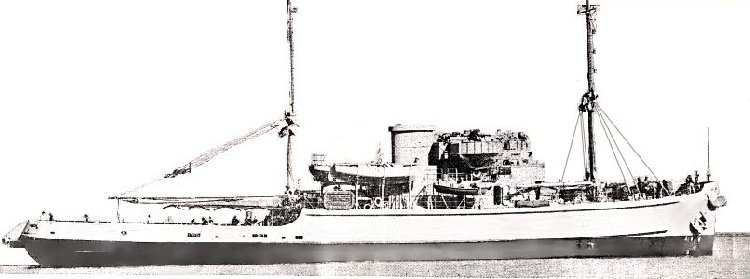
- USS Diver (ARS-5)

Class overview
- Builders: Basalt Rock Company, Napa, California
- Operators: United States Navy (formerly); United States Coast Guard (formerly); Republic of China Navy; Republic of Korea Navy
- Preceded by: Lapwing-class
- Succeeded by: Bolster-class
- Built: 1942–1943
- In commission: 1943–present
- Completed: 19
- Active: 1
- Retired: 18
- Preserved: 1 (Sale pending as of 2019)

General characteristics
- Type: Rescue and salvage ship
- Tonnage: 1,441 long tons (1,464 t)
- Displacement: 1,630 long tons (1,656 t)
- Length: 213 ft 6 in (65.07 m)
- Beam: 39 ft (12 m)
- Draft: 14 ft 4 in (4.37 m)
- Propulsion: Diesel-electric, 2,780 hp (2,073 kW); twin screws
- Complement: 120
- Armament: 4 × 40 mm guns; 4 × .50 cal machine guns

The Diver class of rescue and salvage ship were operated by the United States Navy.

== Ships ==
Ship name	Hull number	Commissioned	Decommissioned	Fate
Diver	ARS-5	23 October 1943	27 July 1946	Sold to a commercial interest, 12 April 1949; fate unknown
Escape	ARS-6	20 November 1943	29 June 1995	Sold for scrap, 24 August 2009
Grapple	ARS-7	16 December 1943	Unknown	Transferred to Taiwan, 1 December 1977; currently active
Preserver	ARS-8	11 January 1944	7 August 1992	Sold for scrap, 30 November 2005
Shackle	ARS-9	5 February 1944	29 June 1946	Transferred to the coast guard, 29 June 1946. (see Acushnet for subsequent history)
Protector	ARS-14	28 December 1943	15 May 1946	Sold to commercial interest, 16 December 1946; fate unknown
Cable	ARS-19	6 March 1944	15 September 1947	Sunk as a target, 7 August 1978
Chain	ARS-20	31 March 1944	9 November 1946	Sold for scrap, June 1979
Curb	ARS-21	12 May 1944	20 December 1946	Sunk as an artificial reef, 23 November 1983
Current	ARS-22	14 June 1944	9 February 1948	Sold for scrap, 27 June 1975
Deliver	ARS-23	14 July 1944	1 August 1979	Transferred to South Korea on 15 August 1979 and renamed ROKS Gumi (ARS-26); Sold for scrap, 28 February 1998
Grasp	ARS-24	22 August 1944	12 December 1946	Transferred to South Korea on 31 March 1978 and renamed ROKS Changwon (ARS-25); Sold for scrap, 31 October 1997
Safeguard	ARS-25	30 September 1944	25 September 1979	Transferred to Turkey and renamed TCG Isin (A-589); decommissioned, 30 March 2017, sunk June 20, 2021
Seize	ARS-26	3 November 1944	14 June 1996	Sunk as a target, 20 June 2006
Snatch	ARS-27	11 December 1944	23 December 1946	Sold for scrap, 8 November 1971
Valve	ARS-28	24 February 1944	26 August 1946	Sold to a commercial interest, 26 July 1948; fate unknown
Vent	ARS-29	7 April 1944	30 August 1946	Sold to a commercial interest, 30 June 1948; fate unknown
Clamp	ARS-33	23 August 1943	6 May 1947	Sold for scrap, 12 April 2011
Gear	ARS-34	24 September 1943	13 December 1946	Sold to a commercial interest, 12 April 1949; fate unknown
