= USS Seize =

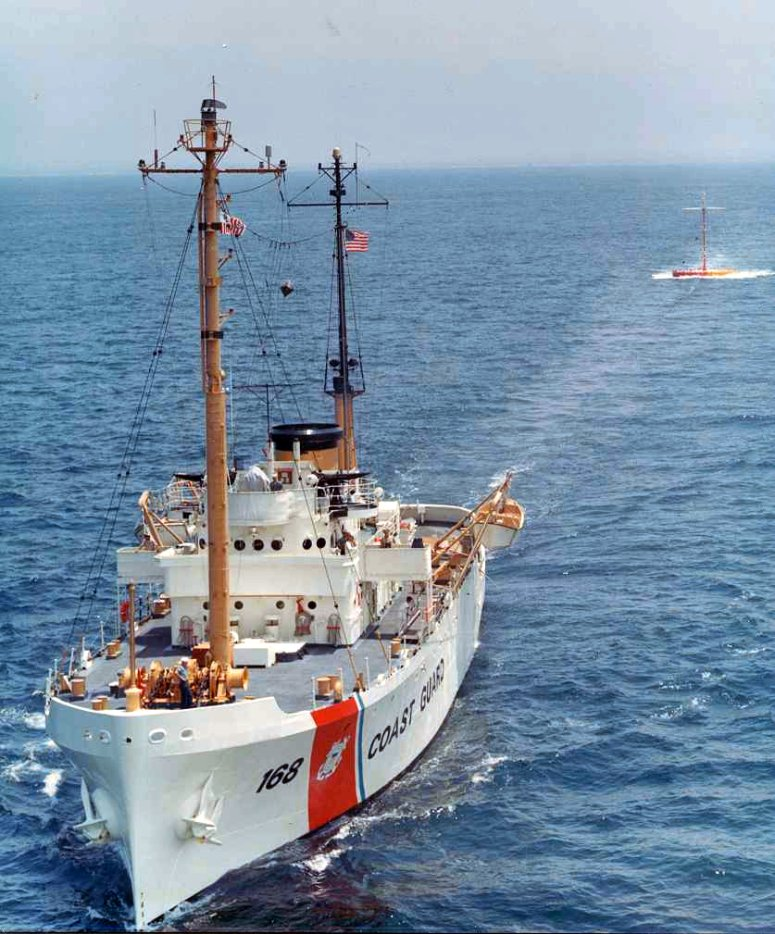
- USCGC Yocona underway

History

United States
- Name: USS Seize
- Operator: United States Navy
- Builder: Basalt Rock Company
- Laid down: 28 September 1943
- Launched: 8 April 1944
- Sponsored by: Mrs. Louis Perkins
- Christened: 3 November 1944
- Commissioned: 3 November 1944
- Decommissioned: 28 June 1946
- Stricken: 13 November 1946
- Identification: ARS-26
- Fate: Transferred to U.S. Coast Guard, 28 June 1946
- Notes: USN call sign NJAU

General characteristics
- Type: Diver-class rescue and salvage ship
- Tonnage: 1,441 tons
- Displacement: 1,630 tons
- Length: 213 ft 6 in (65.07 m)
- Beam: 39 ft (12 m)
- Draught: 14 ft 4 in (4.37 m)
- Propulsion: diesel-electric, twin screws, 2,780 hp
- Speed: 15 knots
- Complement: 120
- Armament: Four 40 mm guns, four M2 Browning machine guns, and small arms

History

United States
- Name: USCGC Yocona
- Namesake: Mississippi river of the same name
- Operator: United States Coast Guard
- Acquired: 28 June 1946
- Commissioned: 28 June 1946
- Decommissioned: 14 June 1996
- Reclassified: Medium Endurance Cutter (WMEC), 1965
- Refit: 1946 & 1965
- Home port: Eureka, California (1946); Astoria, Oregon (1954); Kodiak, Alaska (1983)
- Identification: WAT-168 (1946); WMEC-168 (1965)
- Motto: "Pride in excellence, courage and duty" (1984); "50 and still delivering" (1994)
- Nickname(s): The Mighty Yoc; Yokie Dokie; YO-KO; NO-GO Maru; Yo Mama
- Fate: Sunk as a target of SINKEX, 20 June 2006
- Notes: USCG callsign NNHB.

General characteristics
- Type: Medium Endurance Cutter
- Displacement: 1,756 tons
- Length: 213 ft 6 in (65.07 m)
- Beam: 39 ft (12 m)
- Draught: 14 ft 4 in (4.37 m)
- Installed power: 3,030 BHP
- Propulsion: 4 diesels; 3,030 BHP; twin screws
- Speed: 14.6 knots maximum; 10.3 knots economic
- Range: 13,700 miles
- Complement: 80
- Sensors & processing systems: Radar: OS-8E
- Armament: M2 Browning machine guns and small arms (1946); M60 Machine guns added in 1957

USS Seize (ARS-26) was a Diver-class rescue and salvage ship commissioned in the United States Navy during World War II. Her task was to come to the aid of stricken vessels.

== Ship's history in U.S. Navy ==
Seize was laid down on 28 September 1943 by the Basalt Rock Company in Napa, California; launched on 8 April 1944. Seize was sponsored by Mrs. Louis Perkins; and commissioned at Vallejo, California on 3 November 1944.

On 21 December, the landing ship LST-563 grounded on the reef off Clipperton Island, and the Seize was brought in to help refloat the ship but it too was grounded. Finally, in January 1945, the USS Viking and USS Tenino were able to free the Seize and to offload equipment from LST-563 before it was abandoned.

Following repairs and shakedown, the Seize reported for duty on 11 May 1945 at San Francisco, California. On 2 June 1945, the ship arrived off the entrance to Pearl Harbor, Territory of Hawaii with three pontoon bridges in tow. Reporting to Service Force Squadron 2 for duty, Seize spent a busy first month in repairs, carrying out radar jamming experiments, patrolling, and towing.

On 10 July 1945, she got underway for the Marshall Islands with APL-43 in tow, arriving at Eniwetok on 22 Jul 1945. Seize departed Eniwetok on 4 August 1945, with PB-46 in tow, accompanied by USS Avoyel (ATF-150) (later USCGC Avoyel (WMEC-150)). They reached Guam on 13 August 1945.

On 14 August 1945, still towing PB-46, Seize got underway in convoy for Okinawa Shima. Anchoring there on 22 August 1945, she was relieved of PB-46 the next day, and assisted in salvaging USS Oberrender (DE-344) from 27 August to 11 September 1945.

Seize departed Okinawa on 17 September 1945. Arriving by convoy at Shanghai, China two days later on 19 September 1945, the ship assisted port activity there by searching for a lost anchor, and aiding USS Waller (DD-466) in switching berths. On 10 October 1945, Seize departed Shanghai, China in company with PC-491 for Pusan, Korea. After destroying two horned mines by gunfire en route, the ship reached Pusan, Korea on 13 October 1945 . Two similar mines were destroyed by Seize as she returned to Shanghai China on 16 October 1945.

Seize worked along the Yangtze River in China, removing obstacles, salvaging, towing, and searching, for the remainder of the year. On 22 October 1945 en route to Kichow, China, the ship was fired upon by a machinegun near a small Yangtze River village. She returned fire with 40 millimeter and .50 caliber rounds, and proceeded on her way one half-hour later when all was quiet. One direct hit was received on her foremast and several ricocheted hits were found on the port side, but there was no other damage to the ship or injuries to the crew.

On 26 and 28 January 1946, Seize replanted the mooring buoy at the Naval Seaplane Area at Lunghwa, China. On 11, 18, and 20 February 1946 and on 04, 07, 21, and 29 March 1946, Seize laid an undersea telephone cable from USS San Clemente (AG-79) to the U.S. Naval Operating Base, Shanghai China.

Seize departed Chinese waters on 31 March 1946, anchoring at Yokosuka, Japan, on 4 April 1946. The ship picked up APL-31 in tow on 8 April 1946, and set course for the Hawaiian Islands, arriving at Pearl Harbor, Territory of Hawaii on 26 April 1946.

Seize arrived at San Francisco, California, on 4 June 1946. Decommissioned and transferred to the U.S. Coast Guard on 28 June 1946, she was struck from the Navy list on 13 November 1946.

== Awards and honors ==
Seize’s crew was eligible for the following medals:

- China Service Medal, (extended).
- American Campaign Medal.
- Asiatic–Pacific Campaign Medal.
- World War II Victory Medal.
- Navy Occupation Service Medal.
- National Defense Service Medal.

== Ship's history in U.S. Coast Guard ==
After refitting, she was commissioned as USCGC Yocona (WAT-168), named after a river in Mississippi, and was stationed at Eureka, California and performed law enforcement, search and rescue, salvage and firefighting duties.

In 1954 she transferred to Astoria, Oregon and berthed at the dock on Marine Drive in the city. Whilst in Astoria, Oregon she performed search and rescue, law enforcement, firefighting, fishery patrol, oceanographic surveys, and salvage duties. On 11 November 1955, 50 miles off Cape Lookout, Oregon in 60 to 70 miles-per-hour winds, she went to the rescue of the disabled and sinking FV Ocean Pride. With the seas too heavy to launch lifeboats, the Yocona maneuvered alongside the fishing vessel close enough for the entire crew of thirteen to jump on board the cutter safely.

On the night of 29 September 1959 she rescued ten survivors of a downed U.S. Navy P5M-2 Marlin seaplane that had ditched 110 miles off the Oregon coast. The Yocona was directed on-scene by a U.S. Coast Guard UF Albatross amphibian. This was a Broken Arrow incident in that a Betty depth bomb casing was lost with the Marlin and never recovered, although it was not fitted with a nuclear core.

On 12 January 1961 Yocona participated in the search, rescue and recovery attempt of FV Mermaid, CG-52301 the Triumph, CG-36454 and CG-40564 off Peacock Spit at Cape Disappointment, WA. The rescue effort involved five other Coast Guard boats and four Coast Guard aircraft. The Mermaid was lost with her crew of two. Triumph CG-52301, CG-36454 and CG-40564 were also lost and five Coastguardsmen perished.

On 26 January 1965 she escorted the listing MV Elaine from 180 miles off Astoria to Tongue Point, Astoria Oregon. In 1965 Yocona was refitted and designated a Medium Endurance Cutter (WMEC-168). Yocona underwent a $500,000.00 refit; overhauled one main engine, one ship service generator, and upgraded every major engineering system. This 1965 upgrade greatly extended her service life.

On 13 September 1969 her crew repaired the engine on the disabled FV Karre 300 miles southeast of Kodiak Island, Alaska. On 6 June 1970 she seized the South Korean FV Tae Yang 203 and FV Tae Yang 205 for a territorial waters violation off of Alaska.

During the mid-1970s Yocona deployed five environmental buoys for U.S. National Oceanic and Atmospheric Administration (NOAA) from the Gulf of Alaska to San Diego, California. The buoys were designed to collect weather and sea data on station and relay the information via satellite to the National Weather Service center (NWS) in New Orleans, Louisiana. The buoy anchoring process was difficult due to the sea depth, which was miles. Most of the buoys were non-functional or lost within a year or two after deployment.

In April, 1978, Yocona seized the MV Helena Star after Yocona's boarding team discovered ten tons of marijuana on board. The Helena Star was steaming in U.S. territorial waters whilst showing no flag, which precipitated the boarding.

She was transferred to Kodiak, Alaska in August, 1983 for search and rescue, law enforcement, firefighting, fishery patrol, and salvage duties. On 19 January 1987 she towed the disabled FV Seattle Star to Unalaska Bay, Alaska. On 26 January 1987 she provided medical assistance to the FV Pacific Enterprise. On 27 January 1987 she assisted the MV Tempest off Cape Pankoff after Tempest had an explosion. On 7 February 1987 she fought a fire aboard the FV Amatuli 45 miles east of Cape Pankoff, Alaska. On 8 February 1987 she assisted the FV Fukuyoshi Maru No 85 On 20 August 1987 she apprehended the 66-foot FV Constitution in Peterson Bay, Alaska for using illegal fishing gear.

While on a three-week Alaska Fisheries Patrol in February, 1988, she rescued the grounded FV Last Frontier at Constantine Harbor, Amchitka Island, Alaska. After first putting into U.S. Naval Air Station Adak to de-water her, she then towed the vessel to Dutch Harbor, Alaska.

The next day, 28 February 1988, she fought a fire in the cargo hold of the fish processing ship Tempest, which was anchored in Akutan Bay, Alaska. The USCGC Firebush (WLB-393) also responded; and an HC-130 Hercules dropped fire-fighting equipment to Yocona. Thirty-nine of the 49 crewmen aboard Tempest were evacuated safely while the rest remained aboard to assist in fighting the fire. After 26 hours the fire was extinguished.

In 1989 the Yocona was in Seward, Alaska helping with the clean-up of the SS Exxon Valdez oil spill. Whilst in port, some of the crew of USCGC Planetree (WLB-307) painted "Yo Mama" on Yocona's transom. This prank was noticed by the BMOW the next day, though Yocona endured this nickname for the duration of the spill response.

Yocona conducted 153 law enforcement boardings. Fifty-six for boating, and eleven for Magnuson-Stevens Fishery Conservation and Management Act violations. In addition, Yocona continued to enforce U.S. immigration laws. Yocona performed 10 search and rescue missions which included a vessel saved from grounding. From lessons learned during Alaska patrol, Yocona provided input to the 17th Coast Guard District. This information was used for threat assessment planning, and improved intelligence products.

In March 1995, Yocona earned the Pacific Area Cutter Achievement Award at San Diego, California with a final average 98% overall rating. In November 1995, Yocona participated in a fisheries law enforcement exchange with Russian Maritime Border Guard officers who were on a training visit in Kodiak, Alaska.

On her last patrol prior to being decommissioned, Yocona was awarded her fifth Coast Guard Meritorious Unit Commendation, with the Operational Distinguishing Device, for: "exceptionally meritorious service while promoting Safety of Life at Sea and enforcing the complex Magnuson-Stevens Fishery Conservation and Management Act during the period of 19 May 1994 through 30 May 1996."

Citation (partial) Fifth U.S. Coast Guard Meritorious Unit Commendation with Operational Distinguishing Device

...YOCONA conducted 153 law enforcement boardings resulting in 56 boating and 11 fisheries Magnuson Act violations. In addition, YOCONA continued to stop illegal aliens during boardings. Yocona successfully prosecuted ten Search and Rescue cases which included a vessel saved from grounding. As the Alaska patrol experts, YOCONA's valuable input to the Seventeenth District has been routinely used for threat assessment planning and improved intelligence products for all cutters. In March of 1995, YOCONA earned the Pacific Area Cutter Achievement Award at San Diego, California with a final average 98% overall rating. In November 1995, YOCONA participated in a professional fisheries law enforcement exchange with the Russian Maritime Border Guard Officers on a training visit in Kodiak, Alaska. YOCONA also completed a half million dollar dry dock availability, overhauled one main engine and one ship service generator, and upgraded every major engineering system during the period. These accomplishments allowed the 52-year-old-plus cutter to meet every operational commitment on time...

After four years of U.S. Navy service, and fifty years of U.S. Coast Guard service, Yocona was decommissioned on 14 June 1996. In June 1999 Yocona was photographed by Mr Joe Lewis of the National Association Fleet Tug Sailors (NAFTS) tied up at the north side of Ford Island in Pearl Harbor, Hawaii and was supposedly to be made a museum ship.

The museum effort did not succeed and Yocona was returned to the U.S. Navy to be used as a naval gunnery target at Guam scheduled in 2006. Yocona was sunk during Fleet Exercises on 20 June 2006.

== Awards and honors ==
The Yocona was awarded the following unit decorations:

- Coast Guard Unit Commendation with Operational Distinguishing Device and 4 Award stars. For the periods of:
- 1 June 1977 to 31 May 1978.
- 1 July 1979 to 1 May 1981.
- 9 June 1983 to 11 June 1983.
- 1 August 1992 to 18 May 1994.
- 19 May 1994 to 30 May 1996.
- Coast Guard Meritorious Unit Commendation with Operational Distinguishing Device and 3 Award stars. For the periods of:
- 18 February 1988 – 29 February 1988.
- 1 August 1988 – 1 August 1990.
- 10 January 1989 – 12 January 1989.
- 1 March 1991 – 1 May 1992.

The crew of Yocona was authorized the following individual decorations:

- National Defense Service Medal 3 awards, for service during the Korean, Viet Nam, and first Gulf wars.
- Humanitarian Service Medal 2 awards.
- Special Operations Service Ribbon 2 awards.
