= USS Deliver =

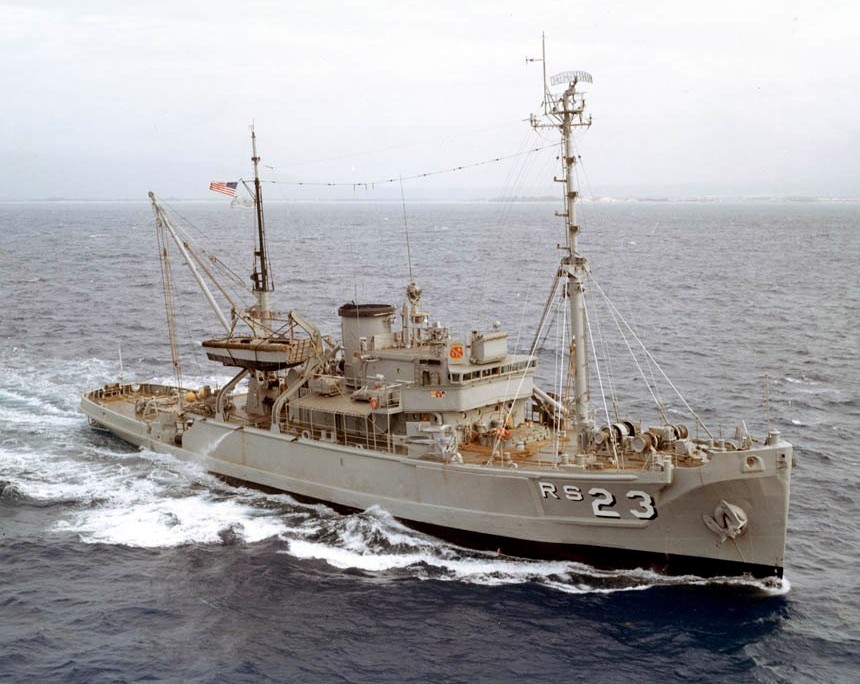
- Deliver underway off Oahu, Hawaii, 13 April 1963

History

United States
- Name: Deliver
- Builder: Basalt Rock Company
- Laid down: date unknown
- Launched: 25 September 1943
- Commissioned: 14 July 1944
- Decommissioned: July 1979
- Stricken: Sold to South Korea
- Fate: Sold to South Korea, 1 August 1979

General characteristics
- Tonnage: 1,441 tons
- Displacement: 1,630 tons
- Length: 213 ft 6 in (65.07 m)
- Beam: 39 ft (12 m)
- Draught: 14 ft 4 in (4.37 m)
- Propulsion: diesel-electric, twin screws, 2,780 hp
- Speed: 15 knots (28 km/h)
- Complement: 120
- Armament: four 40 mm guns, four 0.5 in (12.7 mm) machine guns

USS Deliver (ARS-23) was a Diver-class rescue and salvage ship commissioned by the U.S. Navy during World War II. Her task was to come to the aid of stricken vessels.

Deliver was launched 25 September 1943 by Basalt Rock Company in Napa, California; sponsored by Mrs. W. W. Anderson Jr.; and commissioned 18 July 1944.

== World War II service ==
Deliver arrived at Pearl Harbor 26 September 1944 for duty in the Hawaiian Islands. Assigned to Service Squadron 10 in early 1945, Deliver sailed 23 February for Ulithi, arriving 18 March, for salvage operations in support of the U.S. 5th Fleet. On 1 May she arrived off Okinawa for duty and in addition to her salvage and repair operations, participated in the occupation of Kume Shima on 26 June. Between 6 July and 10 September, Deliver served at Saipan, then returned to Okinawa until 7 December 1945.

== Supporting nuclear testing at Bikini Atoll ==
After overhaul at San Francisco, California, Deliver sailed for Pearl Harbor, arriving 15 April 1946. She was sent to Bikini Atoll 30 May for duty in connection with Operation Crossroads, first assisting in setting up the target vessels used in the atomic weapons tests, then decontaminating the targets and putting inspection teams on board. She assisted in the transfer of the target ships for study from Bikini to Kwajalein until 8 September.

== Struck by fire from Chinese mainland ==
Deliver returned to her home port at Pearl Harbor 9 January 1947 after a U.S. West Coast overhaul. She made two cruises to the Far East for towing and salvage duty, based at Qingdao, China. During her first tour, on 19 June 1947, while attempting to recover a beached pontoon barge, she encountered rifle fire from the beach and the ship was hit. She withdrew briefly to report the situation and in the early afternoon with Admiral C. M. Cooke Jr., Commander Naval Forces, Western Pacific, aboard to direct operations, the ship's salvage party covered by a landing force and fire from the ship recovered the barge. The ship was hit again but no personnel or material injury was sustained. Deliver also operated in the Central Pacific as her salvage and rescue services were required. On one occasion in March 1950 while en route to Pearl Harbor from Eniwetok, she rendezvoused with the disabled net tender Elder and towed her to port.

== Korean War operations ==
During the Korean War, Deliver sailed on 22 June 1951 for Sasebo, arriving 6 July to join the United Nations operations. She gave essential salvage and repair services both at this base and in Korean waters until returning to Pearl Harbor 2 March 1952. She returned to the west coast briefly in the fall of that year, then served again in the Far East from 23 April to 19 December 1953 and from 21 June to 2 November 1954.

== Arctic operations ==
Deliver sailed 20 June 1955 for Seattle, Washington, to join the forces engaged in an Arctic resupply mission, aiding several ships which went aground in the uncharted waters of the Arctic Ocean or were damaged from heavy ice conditions. She returned to Pearl Harbor 30 September 1955, and through 1960, had four tours of duty in the Far East, and joined another Arctic resupply mission in summer 1957.

== Vietnam War operations ==
JAN 1965 - JAN 1966 West Pac-Viet Nam APR 1965 - DEC 1966 West Pac-Viet Nam AUG 1969 - MAY 1970 West Pac-Viet Nam APR 1970 - OCT 1970 West Pac-Viet Nam APR 1973 - NOV 1973 West Pac-Viet Nam JAN 1975 - AUG 1975 West Pac-Viet Nam MAR 1975 - APR 1975 C-5A RECOVERY - VIETNAM MAR 1975 - APR 1975 West Pac-Viet Nam APR 1975 - MAY 1975 Operation Frequent Wind - Fall of Saigon Vietnam http://www.hullnumber.com/ARS-23

== Decommissioning ==
Deliver was decommissioned during July 1979 at Bravo piers at Naval Station, Pearl Harbor as I attended the ceremony while serving at CINCPACFLT Staff and struck from the Naval Register. She was sold to South Korea under the Security Assistance Program, 1 August 1979. Current Disposition: Sold to South Korean Navy as Rescue and Salvage Ship Gumi, now decommissioned.

== Military awards and honors ==
Deliver received one battle star for World War II service:

- Okinawa Gunto operation

She received three campaign stars for Korean War service:

- UN Summer-Fall Offensive
- Second Korean Winter
- Korea, Summer-Fall 1953

For the Vietnam War she received nine campaign stars:

- Vietnamese Counteroffensive Phase II
- Vietnamese Counteroffensive Phase III
- Tet Counteroffensive
- Vietnamese Counteroffensive Phase IV
- Vietnam Summer-Fall 1969
- Sanctuary Counteroffensive
- Vietnamese Counteroffensive Phase VII
- Consolidation I
- Consolidation II

Her crew members were eligible for the following medals and ribbons:

- Combat Action Ribbon (27-28FEB68)
- Navy Meritorious Unit Commendation (2)
- China Service Medal (extended)
- American Campaign Medal
- Asiatic-Pacific Campaign Medal (1)
- World War II Victory Medal
- Navy Occupation Service Medal (with Asia clasp)
- National Defense Service Medal (2)
- Korean Service Medal (3)
- Armed Forces Expeditionary Medal (1-Op. Frequent Wind)
- Vietnam Service Medal (9)
- Humanitarian Service Medal (Frequent Wind)
- Republic of Vietnam Gallantry Cross Unit Citation (3)
- United Nations Service Medal
- Republic of Vietnam Campaign Medal
- Republic of Korea War Service Medal (retroactive)
