= USS Escape =

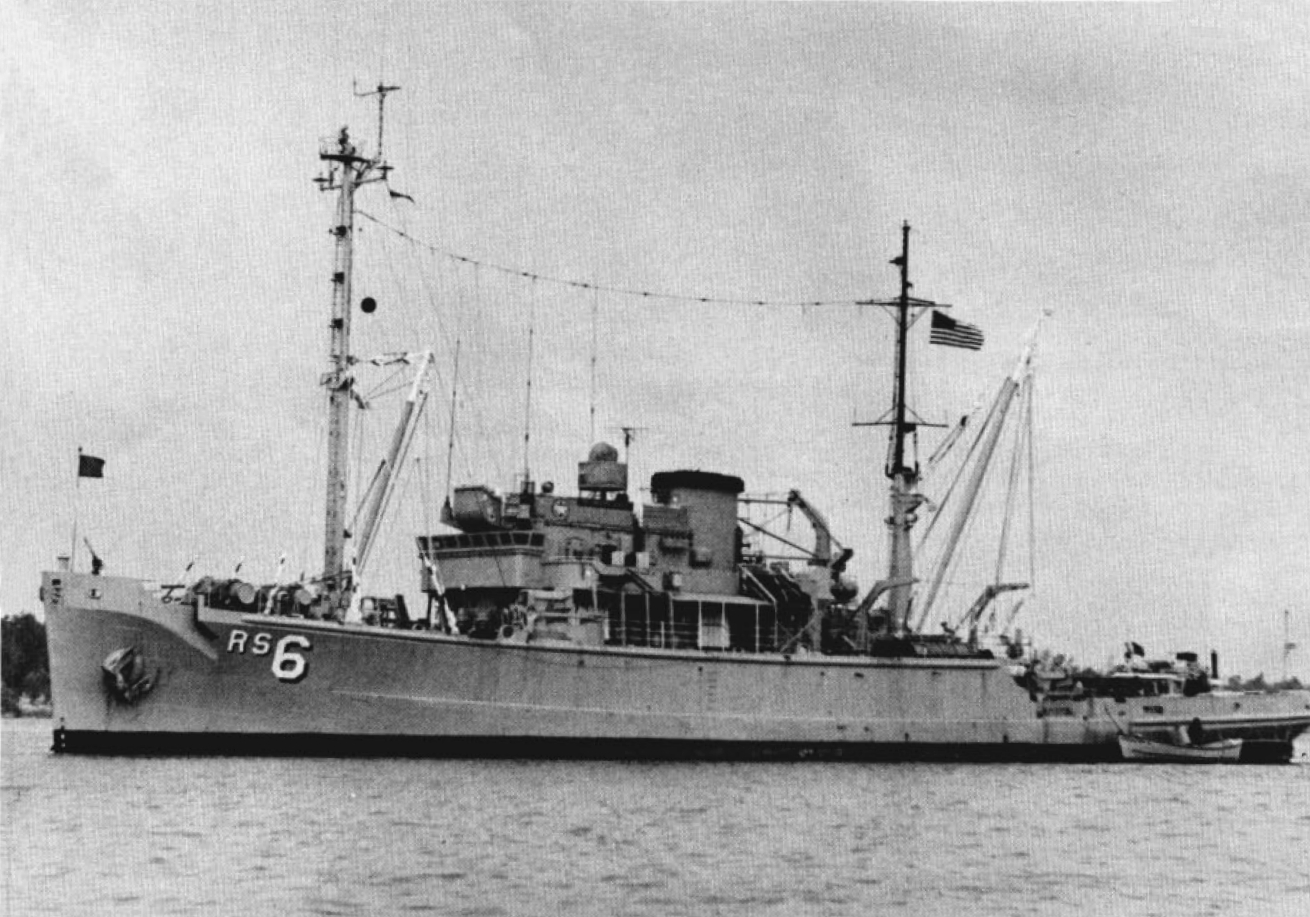
- Escape on Lake Timsah, 1974

History

United States
- Builder: Basalt Rock Company
- Laid down: 24 August 1942
- Launched: 22 November 1942
- Commissioned: 20 November 1943
- Decommissioned: 20 July 1946
- In service: USCGC Escape (WMEC-6), 1 September 1978
- Out of service: 29 June 1995
- Stricken: 29 June 1995
- Fate: Sold for scrap August 2009

General characteristics
- Tonnage: 1,441 tons
- Displacement: 1,630 tons
- Length: 213 ft 6 in (65.07 m)
- Beam: 39 ft (12 m)
- Draft: 14 ft 4 in (4.37 m)
- Propulsion: diesel-electric, twin screws, 2,780 hp
- Speed: 15 knots (28 km/h)
- Complement: 120
- Armament: two 40 mm AA gun mounts; four 0.5 in (12.7 mm). machine guns

USS Escape (ARS-6) was a Diver-class rescue and salvage ship commissioned by the United States Navy for service in World War II. She was responsible for coming to the aid of stricken vessels.

Escape (ARS-6) was launched 22 November 1942 by Basalt Rock Company in Napa, California; sponsored by Mrs. J. E. Brenner; and commissioned 20 November 1943.

== World War II service ==
Escape sailed from San Diego, California, 31 December 1943 for Norfolk, Virginia, where from 4 February she was based for general salvage and towing duties. Between 10 July and 9 September, she performed similar duties out of Bermuda, and on 12 September, put to sea from Norfolk to rescue hurricane-disabled SS George Ade. She reached the stricken ship on the 15th, and brought her safely to port through another violent storm, in which she herself was damaged.

From 31 December 1944 to 4 June 1945, Escape again operated out of Bermuda, during this time aiding three large ships damaged by heavy seas. On 11 August, she departed Norfolk for the Pacific Ocean, but with the end of hostilities, her orders were changed, and after towing scows from Coco Solo, Panama Canal Zone, to Tampa, Florida, she sailed to Davisville, Rhode Island, for mooring buoys. These she laid at Jacksonville, Florida, in October.

== End of war in Europe ==
Escape sailed from Key West, Florida, 8 November 1945 to escort and later tow the Goffredo Mameli to Taranto. She returned to Norfolk 22 January 1946, and on 20 July 1946 was decommissioned and placed in reserve at Orange, Texas.

== Recommissioning during Korean War ==
Recommissioned 12 July 1951, Escape was homeported at Norfolk for salvage and towing services to the Fleet along the east coast, and from 1954, spent alternate years in the Caribbean, based on San Juan, Puerto Rico.

On 26 January 1960 Escape got underway for Operation Sky Hook. While on station she was diverted to Culebra Island, Puerto Rico, to assist Jonas Ingram (DD-938) which had gone aground.

== Project Mercury ==
On 30 January 1960 Escape got underway to assist in Project Mercury, a United States space-flight program. She continued to give essential support to the fleet through the remainder of 1960.

On 1 September 1978, she was decommissioned and laid up in the National Defense Reserve Fleet.

== Transfer to Coast Guard ==
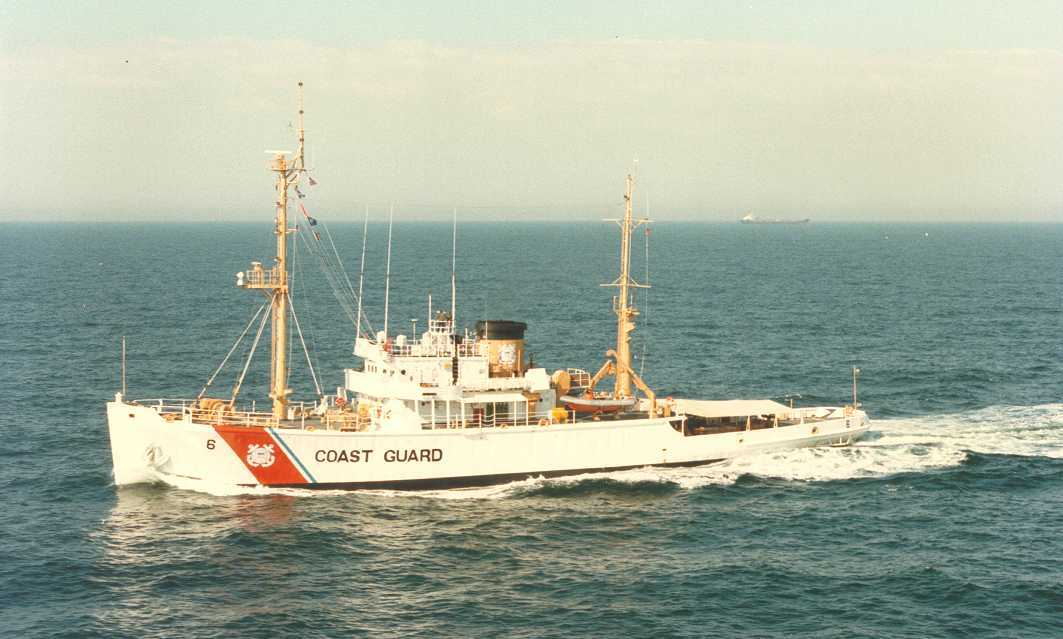
Escape in Coast Guard colours.

Escape was transferred to the United States Coast Guard and commissioned USCGC Escape (WMEC-6), 1 September 1978. She served the Coast Guard until 29 June 1995 when she was returned to the Navy.

== Final decommissioning ==
Escape was decommissioned and returned to Naval custody, 29 June 1995. She was struck from the Naval Vessel Register, 29 June 1995 and her title was transferred to the Maritime Administration (MARAD). She was then laid up in the National Defense Reserve Fleet, James River Group, Fort Eustis, Virginia. Her final disposition was a sale to Bay Bridge Enterprises for scrap in August 2009.

== Military awards and honors ==
Escape’s crew was eligible for the following medals:

- American Campaign Medal
- World War II Victory Medal
- National Defense Service Medal
- Armed Forces Expeditionary Medal (1-Cuba, 1-Dominican Republic)
