= USS Grapple (ARS-7) =

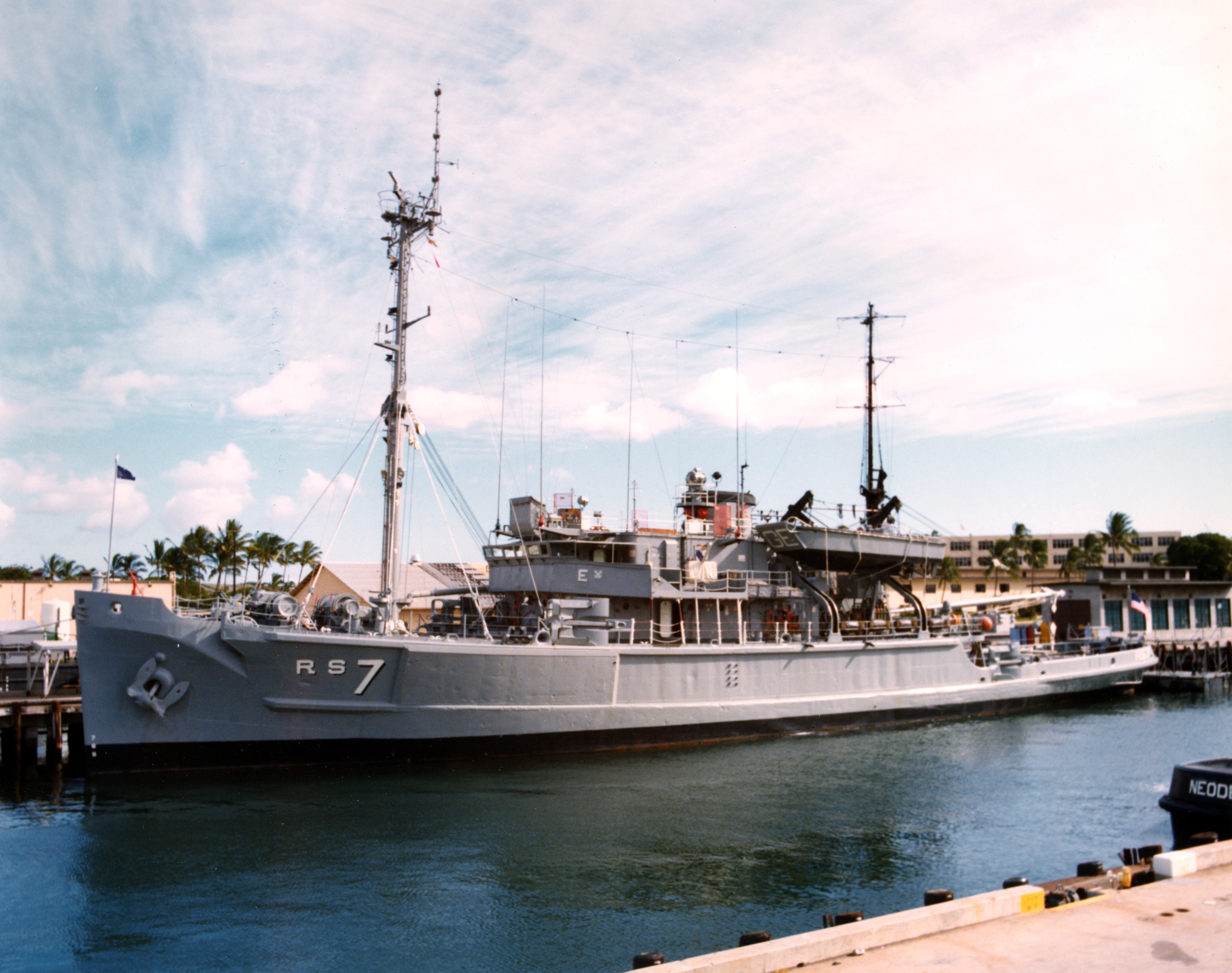

History

United States
- Name: USS Grapple
- Builder: Basalt Rock Company
- Laid down: date unknown
- Launched: 31 December 1942
- Commissioned: 16 December 1943
- Decommissioned: 30 August 1946
- In service: 20 December 1951
- Out of service: date unknown
- Stricken: 1 December 1977
- Fate: Sold to Taiwan, 1 December 1977

Taiwan
- Name: ROCS Da Hu
- Acquired: 1 December 1977
- Identification: ARS-552
- Status: In active service as of 2019

General characteristics
- Tonnage: 1,441 tons
- Displacement: 1,630 tons
- Length: 213 ft 6 in (65.07 m)
- Beam: 39 ft (12 m)
- Draught: 14 ft 4 in (4.37 m)
- Propulsion: diesel-electric, twin screws, 2,780 hp
- Speed: 15 knots (28 km/h)
- Complement: 120
- Armament: two 40 mm AA gun mounts; four 0.5 in (12.7 mm). machine guns

USS Grapple (ARS-7) is a Diver-class rescue and salvage ship commissioned in the United States Navy from 1943 to 1946 and from 1951 to 1977. In 1977, she was sold to Taiwan and was renamed ROCS Da Hu (ARS-552).

== U.S. Navy (1943-1977) ==
Grapple (ARS-7) was launched by Basalt Rock Company in Napa, California, on 31 December 1942; sponsored by Mrs. Thomas D. Rose; and commissioned 16 December 1943 at Vallejo, California.

=== World War II ===
One of the first ships designed to operate as a combat-salvage vessel, Grapple conducted shakedown off the California coast until 15 February 1944, when she sailed for Pearl Harbor with barge YW-69 in tow. With three barges in tow, she departed Pearl 21 March 1944, proceeded via Majuro and Tarawa to Espiritu Santo, New Hebrides, Florida Island, and Guadalcanal.

There, Grapple performed miscellaneous screening exercises and readied for her part in the upcoming invasion of Guam, another step in America's sweep to victory across the Pacific. On 15 June, she came under enemy attack for the first time as three Japanese dive bombers came out of the sun in a surprise attack. Alert antiaircraft crews shot down one of them and seriously damaged another.

Grapple cleared Kwajalein, staging area for the Guam assault, on 15 July, then, 6 days later, was standing off Guam in support of the first wave of assault troops. Her vital salvage work at Guam included pulling stranded landing craft off the beaches and repairing damaged ships, usually within range of enemy fire. Demolition crews from Grapple also performed the important work of clearing the Apra Harbor entrance of a Japanese freighter sunk by American bombers. After the consolidation of Guam, Grapple returned to Espiritu Santo via Eniwetok for repairs and preparation for the next major assault.

Rendezvousing with a convoy at Florida Island, Grapple sailed on 4 September for the initial assault phase on Peleliu Island, Palaus, which began 15 September. Under constant fire from enemy shore batteries, she laid small-craft mooring buoys inside Peleliu's protective reef before being dispatched to aid Wadleigh (DD-689), badly damaged in a mine field. While working on the disabled destroyer, a project which lasted over 2 weeks, Grapple also assisted several beached landing craft and effected temporary repairs on others.

On 24 December, Grapple entered Leyte Gulf, late the scene of one of the war's bloodiest and most decisive naval battles, for further salvage work. Four days later, she sailed into Mindanao Gulf to salvage SS William Sharon, an abandoned Liberty ship still smoldering from kamikaze attacks. The salvage ship, with Sharon in tow, and her two destroyer escorts were attacked by Japanese fighter planes in the pre-dawn hours of 30 December, but the planes were driven off.

From Leyte Grapple headed north as the invasion of the Philippines unfolded deep into enemy held territory at Lingayen Gulf, again in the initial assault phase. Brilliant salvage work at Lingayen Gulf from 6 January to 26 February 1945 earned Grapple and her crew the Navy Unit Citation.

She remained on fire-fighting, rescue, and salvage station at Ulithi and Saipan through 7 May, distinguishing herself in fire-fighting efforts on the carrier Randolph (CV-15), hit by kamikazes on 11 March. After towing a derrick and a lighter to Leyte, Grapple sailed for Pearl Harbor. On 6 June she was diverted to assist SS William Hawkins, adrift near Johnston Island; taking the merchantman in tow, she reached Hawaii 11 June, stopping only long enough to disengage her tow before continuing to Portland, Oregon, where she docked 22 June.

Japan surrendered before Grapple returned to Hawaii on October 19. There she performed various duties until returning to the coast. She reached San Diego, California, on 15 May, decommissioned there 30 August 1946 and went in reserve.

=== Korean War ===
With the outbreak of the Korean War, Grapple re-commissioned 26 December 1951 at San Diego. After training exercises, she sailed to Pearl Harbor and from there to Japan, reaching Sasebo 8 May 1952. Five days later she sailed for Korea and joined British units of the United Nations Fleet off Daido Ko 17 May. Later she sailed to Ullong Do and was temporarily converted into a floating laboratory as Navy doctors frantically tried to stem a typhoid epidemic sweeping the peninsula.

On 8 August Grapple began "flycatcher" duty off the Korean coast, patrolling at night to thwart enemy sampans laying mines in the shallows. While at anchor near Wonsan on 12 August, Grapple came under heavy fire from shore batteries, and before she could clear the area was hit just below the water line. Her damage control party removed the unexploded projectile and patched up the 6" by 15" hole.

Three days later, while still on patrol, Grapple suffered more severe injuries—this time inflicted by a friend. Because of a mistake in Identification signals, Chief (AM-315) opened fire on Grapple at a range of about 900 yards. Several shells fell short or exploded above the ship, but one 3" projectile hit just above the pilot house, killing 2 men, injuring 11 others, 3 critically, and doing extensive damage to pilot house and gun deck. After repairs at Sasebo, Grapple returned to Korea, making three more "flycatcher" patrols to protect U.S. ships operating off shore before returning to Pearl Harbor 9 December 1952. She then sailed for overhaul at Seattle, Washington.

=== Cold War ===
Subsequently, Grapple was based at Pearl Harbor, performing a variety of salvage duties in the mid-Pacific and other areas. In 1953, 1955, 1956, and 1957, late summer Arctic supply cruises took her through Aleutian waters and into the hazardous ice floes of the Arctic Circle to repair and supply units of the fleet stationed there. In nine Western Pacific cruises to date, Grapple has crossed the Pacific to Korea, Japan, Formosa, the Philippines, South Vietnam, and Hong Kong. On these, Grapple extensively trained ROK and Nationalist Chinese divers in newest salvage techniques.

Extraordinary duties for Grapple included blasting the coral reef to widen the harbor entrance at Johnston Island in April 1954 prior to nuclear testing. In addition while prepared to act during a flare-up in the Quemoy–Matsu area in August and September 1958, she assisted Hilo, Hawaii, in mopping up after a devastating tsunami May 1960. During July and August 1965 she participated in the successful salvage operation of freeing Frank Knox (DDR-742), grounded on Pratas Reef in the South China Sea.

=== Vietnam War ===
Departing Pearl Harbor 16 November 1966, Grapple reached waters off South Vietnam 10 December for salvage and rescue operations. Late in the month she prepared to salvage a grounded tug from a reef north of Huế, South Vietnam. Grapple was still on station in the Pacific, providing valuable salvage and rescue work for planes and ships as well as participating in a variety of miscellaneous duties and exercises.

== Republic of China Navy (1977–present) ==
Grapple was decommissioned (date unknown) and struck from the Naval Vessel Register on 1 December 1977. She was then sold to Taiwan under the Security Assistance Program, 1 December 1977, and renamed ROCS Da Hu (ARS-552) where she is in active service.

== Military awards and honors ==
Grapple received three battle stars for World War II service:

- Marianas operation
- Western Caroline Islands operation
- Luzon operation

She received one campaign star during the Korean War:

- Korean Defense Summer-Fall 1952

She received five campaign stars during the Vietnam War:

- Vietnamese Counteroffensive - Phase IV
- Vietnamese Counteroffensive - Phase V
- Vietnam Summer-Fall 1969
- Vietnam Winter-Sprint 1970
- Vietnamese Counteroffensive - Phase VII

Her crew was eligible for the following medals and ribbons:

- Combat Action Ribbon (retroactive, 15 September 1944 and 30 December 1944)
- Navy Unit Commendation
- Navy E Ribbon
- American Campaign Medal
- Asiatic-Pacific Campaign Medal (3)
- World War II Victory Medal
- National Defense Service Medal (2)
- Korean Service Medal (1)
- Armed Forces Expeditionary Medal (1-Taiwan Straits)
- Vietnam Service Medal (5)
- Republic of Vietnam Gallantry Cross Unit Citation (2)
- Philippines Liberation Medal (1)
- United Nations Service Medal
- Republic of Vietnam Campaign Medal
- Republic of Korea War Service Medal (retroactive)
