= USS Chain =

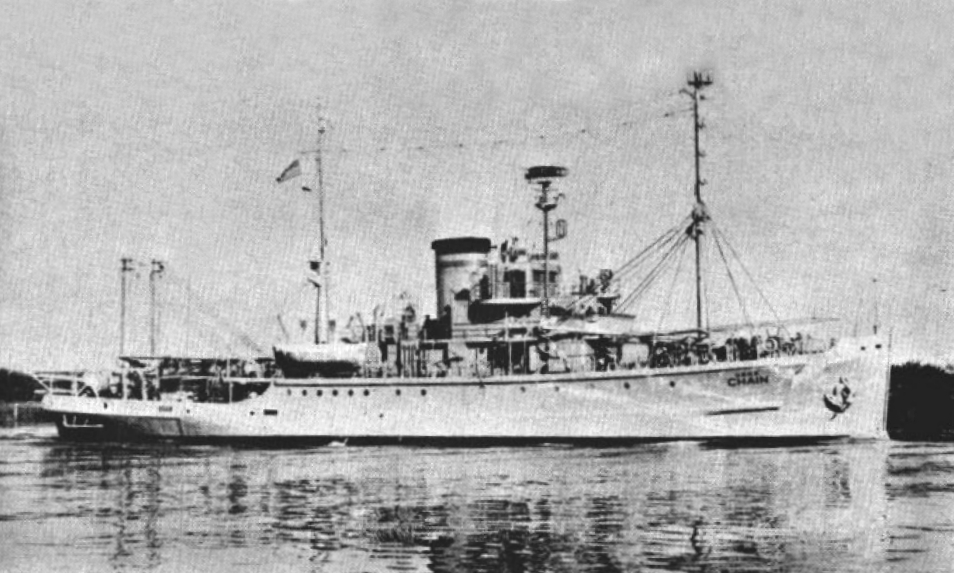
- USNS Chain (T-AGOR-17) underway c1961

History

United States
- Builder: Basalt Rock Company
- Laid down: date unknown
- Launched: 3 April 1943
- Commissioned: USS Chain (ARS-20), 31 March 1944
- Decommissioned: 9 November 1946
- In service: USNS Chain (T-AGOR-17); during 1958
- Out of service: Unknown
- Stricken: 30 December 1977
- Identification: IMO number: 7738515
- Fate: Scrapped, June 1979

General characteristics
- Tonnage: 1,441 tons
- Displacement: 1,630 tons
- Length: 213 ft 6 in (65.07 m)
- Beam: 39 ft (12 m)
- Draught: 14 ft 4 in (4.37 m)
- Propulsion: diesel-electric, twin screws, 2,780hp
- Speed: 15 knots
- Complement: 120
- Armament: four 40 mm guns, four 0.5 in (12.7 mm) machine guns

USS Chain (ARS-20/T-AGOR-17) was a Diver-class rescue and salvage ship commissioned by the United States Navy during World War II. Her task was to come to the aid of stricken vessels.

Chain (ARS 20) was launched 3 June 1943 by Basalt Rock Company in Napa, California; sponsored by Mrs. P. F. Roach; and commissioned 31 March 1944.

== World War II service ==
Chain sailed from San Diego, California on 14 May 1944, bound for the Panama Canal, and Trinidad, which she reached 2 June. She towed barge YF-324 to Recife, Brazil, where on 2 July she joined the U.S. 4th Fleet for operations as tug and salvage ship from Recife and Bahia, Brazil, until 18 June 1945, when she cleared Recife for Norfolk, Virginia. Her essential support played an important, if humble, part in enabling the 4th Fleet to carry out its mission of protecting the South Atlantic Ocean.

=== Convoying Italian submarines ===
After overhaul and training at Norfolk, on 22 September 1945 Chain cleared for Key West, Florida, where she made rendezvous with three Italian submarines. Sailing east, her little convoy was enlarged by four additional Italian submarines at Bermuda, and she arrived at Taranto, Italy, with her charges 3 November. Chain returned by way of Palermo, Sicily, where she took the covered lighter YF-445 in tow, to Charleston, South Carolina, arriving 31 December 1945.

== Grounded in Block Island Sound ==
Chain operated along the U.S. East Coast, towing barges and decommissioned ships until she grounded in Block Island Sound 29 March 1946. Quickly floated by Coast Guard Cutter Dix, Chain's bottom was heavily damaged, and from 3 April until 25 June, she was repaired at New London, Connecticut.

== Post-war decommissioning ==
She left New London astern 25 June, steaming to Orange, Texas, where she was decommissioned and placed in reserve 9 November 1946.

== Reassignment as research vessel ==
She was assigned to the Military Sea Transportation Service (MSTS) in 1958, and reclassified Oceanographic Research Ship USNS Chain (T-AGOR-17). She was operated by the Woods Hole Oceanographic Institute as one of the University-National Oceanographic Laboratory System research vessels.

== Final decommissioning ==
Chain was struck from the Naval Register on 30 December 1977 and scrapped in June 1979.
