= USS Shackle =

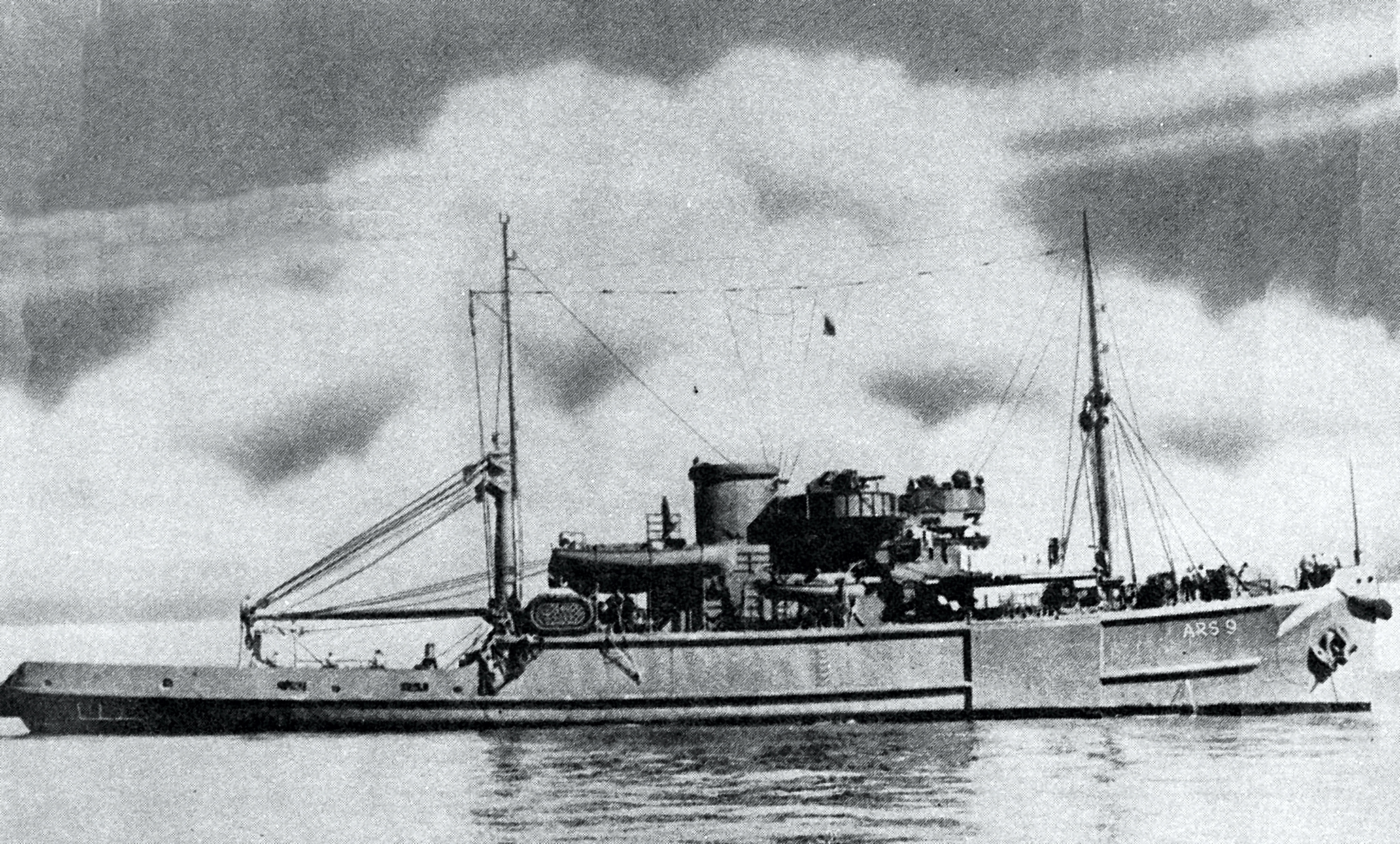
- USS Shackle during World War II

History

United States
- Name: USS Shackle
- Builder: Basalt Rock Company
- Laid down: 26 October 1942
- Launched: 1 April 1943
- Sponsored by: Mrs. Walker Cochran
- Commissioned: 5 February 1944
- Decommissioned: 29 June 1946
- Fate: Transferred to the US Coast Guard on 23 August 1946 and renamed USCGC Acushnet (WAT-167)

General characteristics
- Type: Diver-class rescue and salvage ship
- Tonnage: 1,441 long tons (1,464 t)
- Displacement: 1,630 long tons (1,656 t)
- Length: 213 ft 6 in (65.07 m)
- Beam: 39 ft (12 m)
- Draft: 14 ft 4 in (4.37 m)
- Propulsion: Diesel-electric, 2,780 hp (2,073 kW); twin screws
- Complement: 120
- Armament: 4 × 40 mm guns; 4 × .50 cal machine guns

USS Shackle (ARS-9) was a Diver-class rescue and salvage ship commissioned by the U.S. Navy for service in World War II. She was responsible for coming to the aid of stricken vessels.

Shackle (ARS-9) was laid down on 26 October 1942 by the Basalt Rock Company in Napa, California; launched on 1 April 1943; sponsored by Mrs. Walker Cochran; and commissioned on 5 February 1944.

== World War II service ==
Deck plans as of 1942

Following shakedown out of San Diego, California, Shackle proceeded to Pearl Harbor. In May, she continued west to Midway Island where she cleared the entrance channel of the wreckage of Macaw (ARS-11). She then returned to Hawaii; and, in late November, took ARD-2H in tow and again headed west. Brief duties at Eniwetok, Guam, and Saipan followed; and, in late January 1945, she commenced preparations for the assault on Iwo Jima.

=== Okinawa operations ===
A unit of Task Force 51, she arrived in the Volcano Islands on 19 February and remained until 10 March. Having completed over 44 salvage and diving assignments, she then sailed for Ulithi to prepare for the Okinawa campaign. On 27 March, she departed the Carolines for the Ryukyus where, operating from Kerama Retto, she provided assistance to ships on the vulnerable screening stations in the Okinawa area and made repairs and pumped water from damaged ships in preparation for docking them. In May alone, she provided salvage and repair assistance to 21 ships, many of which were kamikaze victims.

=== Minesweeping the East China Sea ===
On 1 July, Shackle joined Task Group 39.11, a mine-sweeping group; and, during that month, as area "Juneau" in the East China Sea was swept, she combined salvage and mine disposal duties. At the end of the month, she returned to Buckner Bay, where, on 12 August, she witnessed the torpedoing of Pennsylvania and immediately commenced salvage work on the damaged battleship. Three days later, the war ended.

=== End-of-war activity ===
Shackle remained in the Buckner Bay area until 20 September. She then sailed for Tokyo Bay where, into November, she was employed in clearing the docking area at Yokosuka. On the 27th, she started back across the Pacific Ocean. Salvage duties interrupted her voyage at Wake Island where she refloated and towed the hulk of the 326-foot dredge Columbia back to Pearl Harbor. At the end of December, she arrived at Pearl Harbor; and, in February 1946, continued on to the west coast.

== Post-war decommissioning ==
She remained at San Diego, California, until ordered to San Francisco, California, where, on 29 June, she was decommissioned and transferred to the United States Coast Guard as the USCGC Acushnet.

== Current status ==
On 23 February 2007 Acushnet was designated as "Queen of the Fleet" being the oldest commissioned cutter in the fleet. This distinction is denoted by gold hull numbers on the bow of the ship.

The ship was decommissioned on 11 March 2011.

== Military awards and honors ==
Shackle (ARS-9) earned three battle stars during World War II:

- Iwo Jima operation (Assault and occupation of Iwo Jima, 19 February to 10 March 1945)
- Okinawa Gunto operation (Assault and occupation of Okinawa Gunto, April to June 1945)
- Minesweeping Operations Pacific (Juneau (East China Sea) 1 to 31 July 1945)

Her crew was eligible for the following medals:

- American Campaign Medal
- Asiatic-Pacific Campaign Medal (3)
- World War II Victory Medal
- Navy Occupation Service Medal (with Asia clasp)

== See also ==
- USCGC Acushnet (WMEC-167)
