= USS Diver =

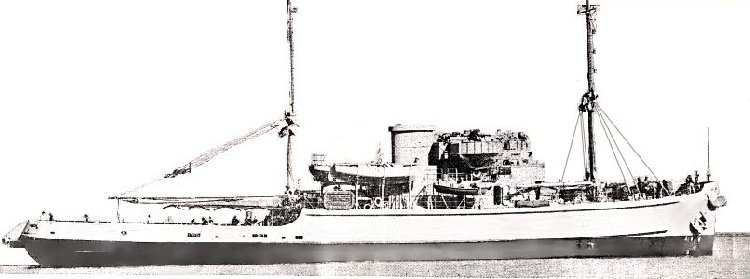
- USS Diver (ARS-5) underway, date and location unknown.

History

United States
- Name: USS Diver
- Builder: Basalt Rock Company
- Laid down: 6 April 1942
- Launched: 19 December 1942
- Commissioned: 23 October 1943
- Decommissioned: 27 July 1946
- Stricken: date unknown
- Fate: Sold, 12 April 1949

General characteristics
- Tonnage: 1,441 tons
- Displacement: 1,630 tons
- Length: 213 ft 6 in (65.07 m)
- Beam: 39 ft (12 m)
- Draft: 14 ft 4 in (4.37 m)
- Propulsion: diesel-electric, twin screws, 2,780 hp
- Speed: 15 knots (28 km/h)
- Complement: 120
- Armament: two 40 mm AA gun mounts; four 0.5 in (12.7 mm). machine guns

USS Diver (ARS-5) was a Diver-class rescue and salvage ship commissioned by the U.S. Navy for service in World War II. She was responsible for coming to the aid of stricken vessels.

Diver (ARS-5) was launched 19 December 1942 by Basalt Rock Company in Napa, California; sponsored by Mrs. F. M. Young; and commissioned 23 October 1943.

== World War II North Atlantic operations ==
Diver arrived at Falmouth, England, from Norfolk, Virginia, 15 February 1944. After 3 days of salvage training operations at Rosneath Bay, Scotland, she reported to Portland, England, 27 March, for preparations for the coming invasion of Normandy.

=== Assisting during the Normandy invasion ===
On 26 June she got underway for Baie de la Seine, France, where she was attached to the Salvage, Wreck Disposal, Mine Disposal, and Hydrographic Survey Unit. She rescued 30 survivors of the Norwegian freighter SS Norfolk, sunk by mine while on her way to Cherbourg on 20 July and 21 July, then reported for salvage operations at Utah Beach and Omaha Beach. She arrived at Le Havre 11 November to continue her salvage work. Sailing to aid a torpedoed British transport 28 December Diver struck an unmarked submerged obstacle and returned to Le Havre for emergency repairs. Permanent repairs were made at Dieppe, from 6 January to 21 January 1945, after which Diver returned to Le Havre to continue her salvage work.

== Duty in Germany ==
Diver sailed for Bremerhaven, Germany, 15 June 1945, by way of Ostend, Belgium, and Den Helder, the Netherlands. From her arrival 22 June she served as guard, ready duty, salvage, and local escort vessel. On 23 August she moved to Brake, Germany, to stand by for any damage to shipping in the Weser River. She left Bremerhaven 4 October with 41 naval passengers and arrived at Norfolk, Virginia, 22 October for overhaul.

== Clearing New York harbor ==
From 9 February to 16 February 1946, Diver was at New York to assist in relieving the harbor congestion caused by a tugboat strike. She served on towing duty between New London, Connecticut, and Portsmouth, New Hampshire, from 18 April to 13 May.

== Post-war decommissioning ==
On 27 May she arrived at Orange, Texas, where she was decommissioned, 27 July 1946. Diver was sold 12 April 1949.

== Military awards and honors ==
Diver received one battle star for World War II service:

- Invasion of Normandy

Her crew was eligible for the following medals:

- American Campaign Medal
- Europe-Africa-Middle East Campaign Medal
- World War II Victory Medal
