= USS Vent =

History

United States
- Laid down: 29 January 1943
- Launched: 30 June 1943
- Commissioned: 6 April 1944
- Decommissioned: 30 August 1946
- Stricken: 12 March 1948
- Identification: IMO number: 7436935
- Fate: Sold, 30 June 1948

General characteristics
- Displacement: 1,630 tons
- Length: 213 ft 6 in (65.07 m)
- Beam: 39 ft (12 m)
- Draught: 14 ft 4 in (4.37 m)
- Propulsion: diesel-electric, twin screws, 2,780hp
- Speed: 15 knots
- Complement: 120
- Armament: four 40 mm guns, four 0.5 in (12.7 mm) machine guns

USS Vent (ARS-29) was a Diver-class rescue and salvage ship commissioned by the U.S. Navy during World War II. Her task was to come to the aid of stricken vessels.

Vent was laid down on 29 January 1943 at Bellingham, Washington, by the Bellingham Marine Railway Co., launched on 30 June 1943, and commissioned on 7 April 1944.

== World War II service ==
Following shakedown, Vent departed Long Beach, California, with YC-1048 in tow on 16 June 1944. She arrived in Hawaiian waters 11 days later and delivered her tow. She participated in salvage operations on five LST's which had been set afire by an accidental explosion and sunk in West Loch, Pearl Harbor, on 21 May. On 23 July, she sailed for the South Pacific Ocean and arrived at Funafuti. Ellice Islands on 7 August. From there, she pushed on for Milne Bay and Manus.

=== South Pacific operations ===
Subsequently, operating out of Espiritu Santo in the New Hebrides, Vent touched at Efate, Noumea, and Guadalcanal. She arrived off Utupua Island on 30 November and from 1 to 3 December, conducted salvage operations, in company with USS Apache (ATF-67) and USS Tawasa (ATF-92), for SS Dominican Victory, grounded off Basilisk Reef.

=== End-of-war operations ===
The salvage ship returned to Pearl Harbor in March 1945 for an overhaul and, while in the Hawaiian Islands, salvaged Fleet Marine force equipment sunk off Hilo from 3 to 5 May. On 2 June, she sailed west once more and proceeded via Eniwetok in the Marshalls to the Marianas. The ship conducted harbor clearance and salvage operations in Tanapag Harbor, Saipan, into the summer of 1945. However, the war's end in August meant little to the ship's deployment, for there was much salvage to be done in the wake of the war.

== Rescuing craft grounded by typhoon ==
The destructive typhoon which swirled into the fleet anchorage at Buckner Bay, Okinawa, in October 1945, swept many small craft ashore. Vent participated in salvaging a number of AFD's grounded on the beaches of Buckner Bay. The salvage ship later operated in the Marianas before she sailed via Pearl Harbor for the west coast of the United States and arrived at San Pedro, California, on 21 June 1946.

== Decommissioning ==
Subsequently decommissioned on 30 August 1946, Vent was struck from the Navy List on 12 March 1948 and sold to Henry J. Barbey on 30 June 1948.

== Military awards and honors ==
Vent's crew members were eligible for the following medals:

- American Campaign Medal
- Asiatic-Pacific Campaign Medal
- World War II Victory Medal
- Navy Occupation Service Medal (with Asia clasp)
