= USS Preserver =

US Navy salvage ship

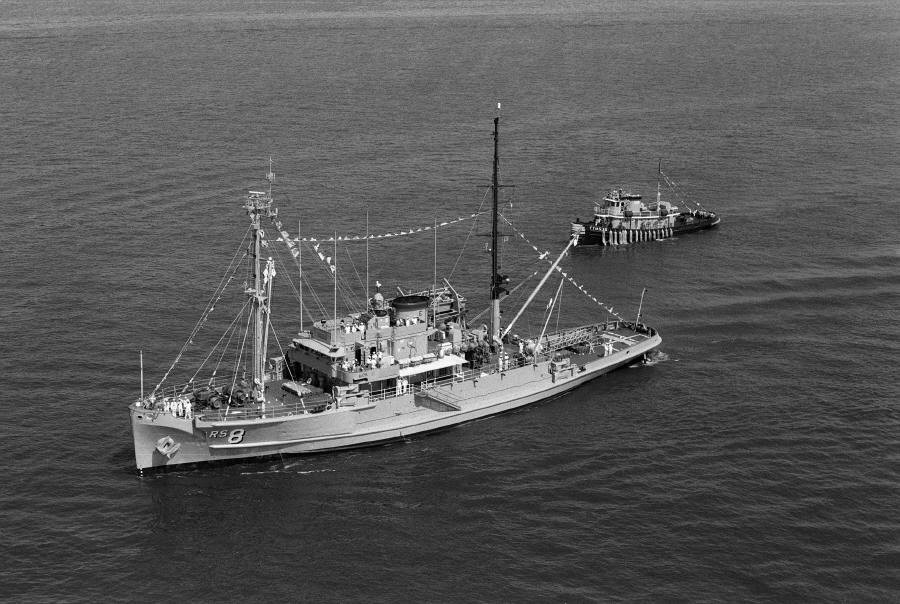

History

United States
- Builder: Basalt Rock Company
- Laid down: 26 October 1942
- Launched: 1 April 1943
- Commissioned: 11 January 1944
- Decommissioned: 23 April 1947
- In service: 1 December 1950
- Out of service: 7 August 1992
- Stricken: 16 March 1994
- Fate: Sold for scrap, 30 November 2005

General characteristics
- Tonnage: 1,441 tons
- Displacement: 1,530 tons
- Length: 213 ft 6 in (65.07 m)
- Beam: 39 ft (12 m)
- Draught: 14 ft 4 in (4.37 m)
- Propulsion: diesel-electric, twin screws, 2,780hp
- Speed: 15 kts.
- Complement: 120
- Armament: two 40 mm AA gun mounts; four .50-caliber machine guns

USS Preserver (ARS-8) was a Diver-class rescue and salvage ship commissioned by the U.S. Navy for service in World War II. She was responsible for coming to the aid of stricken vessels. Preserver was laid down by Basalt Rock Company in Napa, California, 26 October 1942, launched 1 April 1943, sponsored by Mrs. Walter F. LaFranz, and commissioned 11 January 1944.

== World War II service ==
After shakedown out of San Francisco, California, Preserver steamed for Pearl Harbor 26 February in company with PC–1139. The next day she was ordered to come about and to report to Port Director, San Pedro, Los Angeles, for orders. She was once again underway for Pearl Harbor 5 March, with YOG–18 in tow. Arriving Pearl Harbor 16 March, she reported for duty with Service Squadron 2.

=== Saipan operations ===
Hawaiian operations and yard availability took Preserver through April. Steaming for Majuro Atoll 10 May, she arrived two weeks later and commenced salvage operations between Majuro, Eniwetok, and Kwajalein with Service Squadron 10. She was a unit of Capt. S. E. Peck's Service and Salvage Group during the capture of Saipan (15–21 June 1944), providing salvage services off the west coast of that island. When Japanese snipers set off an ammunition dump near the beach at 2100 June 20, Preserver sent a fire-fighting party ashore to render assistance.

Preserver worked at clearing Tanapag Harbor, Saipan 9–23 July. She then worked in the Tinian area. By 12 August she was at Eniwetok, and the next day she steamed for Pearl Harbor, arriving 22 August for upkeep and availability. Repairs kept her at Pearl Harbor until 11 September, when she steamed for Eniwetok, arriving the 28th.

=== Damage ===
She was at Seeadler Harbor, Manus, 6 October, and departed five days later for Leyte Gulf. A bomb penetrated her hull 20 October, flooding her motor room and causing loss of power throughout the ship. Battle damage repairs necessitated calls at Hollandia, New Guinea; Espiritu Santo, New Hebrides. While at Manus she was damaged by the November 1944 USS Mount Hood (AE-11) explosion.

Final repairs commenced at Pearl Harbor from 5 February 1945 through the following July. Preserver stood out of Pearl Harbor 8 August, bound for Kwajalein Atoll, the Marshalls. She made further calls at Guam and Okinawa, and the second week of October she operated at Wakayama, Honshū, Japan.

After the close of hostilities, Preserver participated in salvage operations during the weapons tests at Bikini Atoll, and then decommissioned at San Diego, California, 23 April 1947.

== Reactivated during Korean War ==
She recommissioned at San Diego 1 December 1950, and in January 1951 transferred from the Pacific Fleet to Commander, Service Force, Atlantic. She arrived Norfolk, her new home port, 20 February.

== Arctic operations ==
Since assuming duties out of Norfolk, Preserver performed salvage, rescue, and towing assignments along the Atlantic coast. From 1952 through 1962, she deployed annually for Arctic operations which took her to Greenland, Labrador, Newfoundland, and Nova Scotia as duty salvage ship. She also assisted in the MSTS resupply missions to Greenland.

== Supporting search for the Thresher ==
In 1962 Preserver conducted towing operations to Mayport, Florida, and to Bermuda. She was then assigned to serve in the recovery fleet during the second crewed orbital flight. From April through August 1963, she conducted Trieste support operations as the bathyscaph searched the ocean floor for the submarine USS Thresher, lost 10 April. The bathyscaph finally discovered debris that was definitely identified, and the search was concluded 5 September.

== Final operations ==
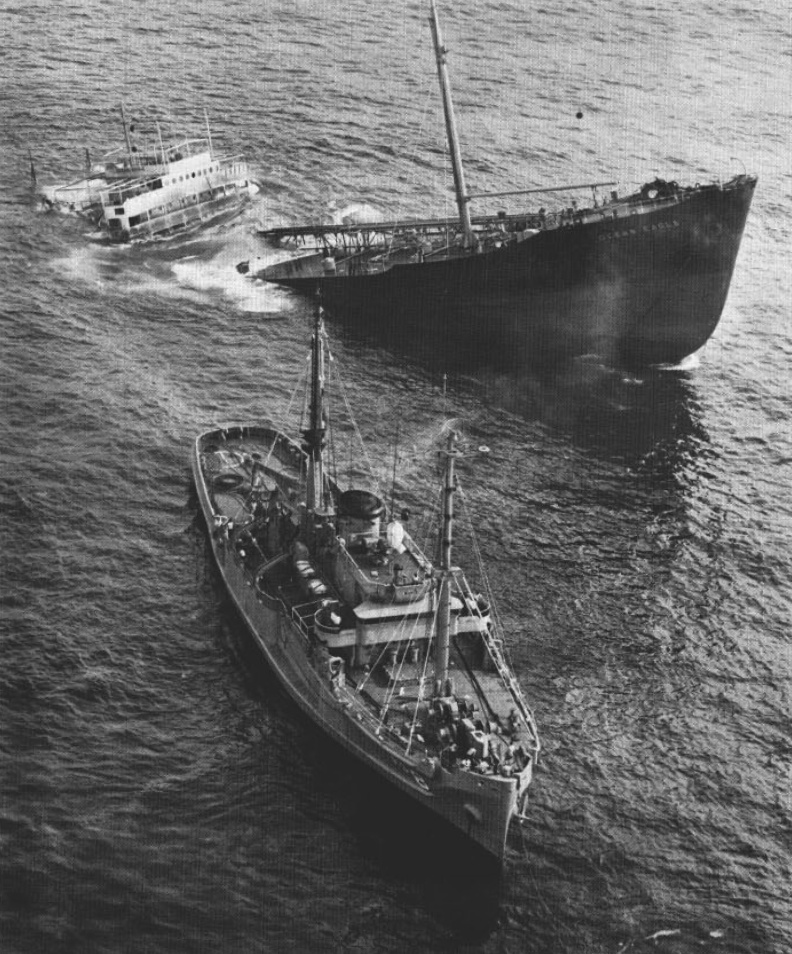
Preserver with the sunken tanker Ocean Eagle off Puerto Rico, 1968.

Further Atlantic Ocean operations were followed by a Mediterranean deployment from February–June 1964. In March 1968 Preserver pumped out of the bow of Liberian tanker SS Ocean Eagle a cargo of oil that threatened major pollution of San Juan, Puerto Rico's harbour. She also extinguished a fire aboard British merchant vessel SS Pizarro 11 April 1968 in San Juan Harbor. She then deployed to the Mediterranean 20 May 1968, returning to Little Creek, Virginia, 2 September. Into 1970 she continued to serve the Fleet as a salvage ship of Service Squadron 8 out of Little Creek, Virginia.

In January 1986 she was tasked with leading the salvage and recovery efforts of the Space Shuttle Challenger disaster. During the transit to Port Canaveral the ship recovered the nose piece of the external fuel tank. The Preserver was on station throughout April 1986. On 7 March 1986, divers from the USS Preserver using sonar located what they believed to be the crew compartment (confirming it during a dive the next day) and commenced recovery operations of the fallen astronauts. John Devlin made the confirmation dive to verify that the wreckage was in fact the crew compartment. On 9 March, NASA announced the finding to the press. The ship received a Navy Unit Commendation for the operation. She was decommissioned on 30 September 1986, and recommissioned the following year.

After Hurricane Hugo, the Preserver was sent to Puerto Rico to aid in the recovery of a sunken ship. The ship drove through Hugo en route to Guantanomo bay, Cuba where it picked up two barges loaded with telephone poles to take to Puerto Rico. It performed the first tandem tow in 40 years of US naval history. The Preserver arrived safely at Puerto Rico and stayed there for nearly two months recovering a sunken vessel from the harbour.

== Final decommissioning ==
Preserver decommissioned 7 August 1992 and was transferred to the Maritime Administration (MARAD) for lay up in the National Defense Reserve Fleet, James River, Fort Eustis, Virginia, 1 February 1993. On 16 March 1994, she was struck from the Naval Vessel Register. Final Disposition: Preserver was moved to Bay Bridge Enterprises yard at Chesapeake, Virginia, 30 November 2005, for dismantling. Note: Bay Bridge was paid a combined $442,640 to dismantle Preserver and USS Marshfield (T-AK-282).

== Military awards and honors ==
Preserver received three battle stars for World War II service. Her crew was eligible for the following medals and ribbons:

- Combat Action Ribbon (retroactive – 20 October 1944)
- Navy Unit Commendation
- Navy Meritorious Unit Commendation (3)
- Navy Battle "E" Ribbon (4)
- American Campaign Medal
- Asiatic–Pacific Campaign Medal
- World War II Victory Medal
- Navy Occupation Service Medal (with Asia clasp)
- National Defense Service Medal
- Armed Forces Expeditionary Medal (2 Dominican Republic)
- Coast Guard Unit Commendation
- Philippines Liberation Medal
