= USS Grasp (ARS-24) =

World War II rescue and salvage ship in the U.S. Navy

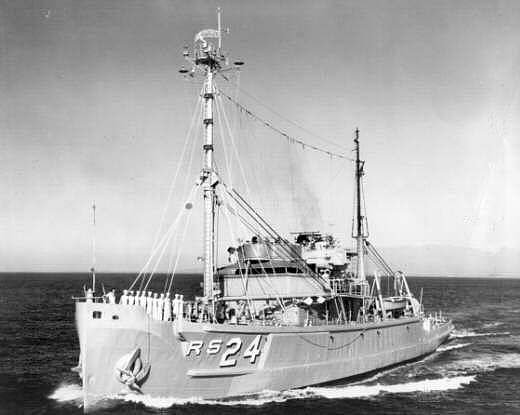

History

United States
- Builder: Basalt Rock Company
- Laid down: date unknown
- Launched: 31 July 1943
- Commissioned: 22 August 1944
- Decommissioned: 12 December 1946
- In service: 10 October 1950
- Out of service: date unknown
- Stricken: 31 March 1978
- Fate: Sold to South Korea, 31 March 1978

General characteristics
- Tonnage: 1,441 tons
- Displacement: 1,630 tons
- Length: 213 ft 6 in (65.07 m)
- Beam: 39 ft (12 m)
- Draught: 14 ft 4 in (4.37 m)
- Propulsion: diesel-electric, twin screws, 2,780 hp
- Speed: 15 knots (28 km/h)
- Complement: 120
- Armament: four 40 mm guns, four 0.5 in (12.7 mm) machine guns

USS Grasp (ARS-24) was a Diver-class rescue and salvage ship commissioned by the U.S. Navy during World War II. Her task was to come to the aid of stricken vessels.

== Construction and commissioning ==
Grasp (ARS-24) was launched 31 July 1943 by the Basalt Rock Company in Napa, California; sponsored by Mrs. J. B. McDonough; and commissioned 22 August 1944.

== World War II operations ==
After fitting out at San Francisco, California, and shakedown along the California coast out of San Diego, California, Grasp sailed for the Pacific Ocean, reaching Hawaii 27 October 1944. From Pearl Harbor she headed for combat, reaching Manus, Admiralty Islands, 24 December to prepare for her role in the upcoming Lingayen Gulf operations. Joining the battle group, under the overall command of Admiral T. C. Kincaid, Grasp sailed for the Philippines 1 January 1945.

=== Kamikaze attacks ===
En route, the ships were attacked by heavy concentrations of Japanese aircraft, including the suicidal kamikazes. Overcoming all attacks, in which Grasp shot down one plane and assisted against others, the fleet forced its way deep into enemy waters and landed General Douglas MacArthur's troops at Lingayen Gulf 9 January. Grasp was there to assist battle damaged ships, and clear the harbor of sunken craft. In addition to aiding USS War Hawk (AP-168) and Otis Skinner, damaged by the Japanese, Grasp pulled two landing craft off the beaches and salvaged a Japanese Army submarine Yu 3 hazardous to shipping.

=== Philippine Islands operations ===
From Lingayen Gulf, Grasp sailed to Tacloban Harbor, Philippines, with an injured APD, Brooks (APD-10), in tow. There she joined TG 78 and on 29 January 1945 participated in the initial landings at Zambales Luzon. After helping to make this another of the Fleet's long role of successful amphibious assaults, Grasp sailed to Manila Harbor 2 March. As part of the harbor clearance force under Commodore W. A. Sullivan, she remained in the Manila area for over a year. Grasp salvaged sunken ships in the harbor and also made emergency repairs to various naval and merchant ships. Departing the Philippines 27 April 1946, she reached San Pedro, California, via Pearl Harbor and Astoria, Oregon, 5 June. Grasp decommissioned there 12 December 1946 and was placed in reserve.

== Reactivated during Korean War ==
When the Korean War broke, ships again immediately became in short supply. Grasp recommissioned at San Diego, California, 10 October 1950 and prepared for combat. Reaching Sasebo, Japan, via Pearl Harbor 12 February 1951, Grasp at once proceeded on to Wonsan, Korea, for salvage and patrol work. As she patrolled the coast between Wonsan and Sondin, both under blockade and siege by the Fleet, Grasp came frequently under fire from Communist North Korean shore batteries, but was never hit.

=== Rescuing downed pilots ===
The two Korean ports were under siege with daily bombardment and minesweeping because of their value as a ditching place for pilots who could not make it back to the carriers steaming off the coast. With the heavy sea protection these pilots could ditch at Wonsan with some confidence of rescue. After 2 months on the line off Korea, Grasp returned to Sasebo 15 April to continue repair work on damaged ships.

=== Final Korean patrol operations ===
After two more cruises along the Korean coast, interspersed with repair work in Japan, Grasp returned to Pearl Harbor 10 October and remained there until sailing for the States 29 January 1952. After quick repairs at San Diego, Grasp returned to Pearl Harbor 12 March and from there steamed to Subic Bay, Philippines, for salvage operations. She reach Sasebo again via Pearl Harbor 16 August and immediately returned to her duties of a month of patrol and rescue work along the Korean coast followed by a month of salvage and repair work in Japan. Returning to San Diego 22 May 1953 for local operations and repair work, Grasp sailed to Pearl Harbor 19 July and was there when the armistice came 27 July.

== Post-Korean War operations ==
Despite the termination of open warfare Korea was to remain an important port of call for Grasp as the salvage ship's peacetime duties settled into a pattern of yearly WestPac cruises out of Pearl Harbor intermixed with local operations and salvage work out of the Hawaiian port. As she sailed each year to join the U.S. 7th Fleet in its massive peacekeeping and patrol work in the western Pacific, Grasp visited such Asian ports as Yokosuka, Taiwan, Hong Kong, Manila, Okinawa, and Eniwetok. America's participation in the struggle against communism in Vietnam added Saigon to this list in 1963. And Grasp was also at Johnston Island in the spring of 1962 in connection with nuclear weapons tests being conducted there.

A reasonable speculation of the Grasp was the recovery of both US and Soviet ICBM reentry vehicles from depths down to 20,000 feet. It was from this experience that the plan to raise a Soviet submarine, the Jennifer Project, was launched.

== Arctic operations ==
Another break in the pattern came in 1956 and again in 1957 as Grasp sailed north to participate in Arctic re-supply and salvage operations in the icy Alaskan waters. Between October 1964 and March 1965 she conducted yet another deployment to the Western Pacific for salvage operations out of the Marianas and the Philippines. After returning to Pearl Harbor in mid-March, she was assigned to salvage and towing duty out of Guam, Marianas. Departing Pearl Harbor 2 November, she reached Guam the 27th. Since that time she has operated out of Guam to the Philippines and Southeast Asian waters and has continued to provide rescue and salvage facilities to ships of the powerful 7th Fleet.

== Decommissioning ==
Grasp was decommissioned (date unknown) and struck from the Naval Register, 31 March 1978. She was sold to South Korea, 31 March 1978 under the Security Assistance Program and became Rescue and Salvage Ship Changwon (ARS-25). Final disposition: Decommissioned by ROK Navy and fate unknown.

== Military awards and honors ==
Grasp was awarded two battle stars for World War II service, five battle stars for Korean War service, and 5 battle stars for Vietnam service. Her crew was eligible for the following ribbons, commendations and medals:

- Combat Action Ribbon (retroactive)
- Navy Unit Commendation (2)
- Navy Meritorious Unit Commendation (3)
- American Campaign Medal
- Asiatic-Pacific Campaign Medal (2)
- World War II Victory Medal
- National Defense Service Medal (2)
- Korean Service Medal (5)
- Armed Forces Expeditionary Medal (1-Vietnam, 1-Korea)
- Vietnam Service Medal (5)
- Republic of Vietnam Gallantry Cross Unit Citation (2)
- United Nations Service Medal
- Republic of Vietnam Campaign Medal
- Republic of Korea War Service Medal (retroactive)
