= USS Cable =

History

United States
- Name: USS Cable
- Builder: Basalt Rock Company
- Launched: 1 April 1943
- Commissioned: 6 March 1944
- Decommissioned: 15 September 1947
- Stricken: 15 April 1977
- Honours and awards: 3 battle stars & Navy Unit Commendation (World War II)
- Fate: Sunk as a target, 7 August 1978

General characteristics
- Class & type: Diver-class rescue and salvage ship
- Displacement: 1,630 long tons (1,656 t)
- Length: 213 ft 6 in (65.07 m)
- Beam: 39 ft (12 m)
- Draft: 14 ft 4 in (4.37 m)
- Propulsion: Diesel-electric, twin screws, 2,780 hp (2,073 kW)
- Speed: 15 knots (28 km/h; 17 mph)
- Complement: 120
- Armament: 4 × 40 mm guns; 4 × 0.5 in (12.7 mm) machine guns

USS Cable (ARS-19) was a Diver-class rescue and salvage ship built for the U.S. Navy during World War II. She served in the Pacific Ocean theater of the war. Because of the bravery of her crew in dangerous combat areas, she returned home after the war's end with three battle stars and the Navy Unit Commendation.

Cable was launched 1 April 1943 by Basalt Rock Company in Napa, California; sponsored by Mrs. B. Elliott; and commissioned 6 March 1944.

== World War II Pacific Theatre operations ==
Cable began her salvage and rescue work while still in shakedown training, when she took in tow for San Diego, California, the water barge AW-86, which had suffered a breakdown off Cape San Lucas, Mexico. Cable cleared San Pedro, California, 30 April 1944, towing small craft to Kwajalein on her way to Milne Bay, New Guinea.

Here she offered salvage and rescue services until sailing 10 August for Manus and Cairns, Australia, where she loaded firefighting and salvage teams. Continuing the lengthy process of invasion preparation, she sailed to Milne Bay to load firefighting equipment, and on 18 October put out from Hollandia, New Guinea, in a convoy of supply ships for the initial landings on Leyte.

=== Supporting the invasion of the Philippines ===
Many ships were damaged in the furious naval and air actions which accompanied the Leyte, and later the Lingayen, operations. Cable's essential services aided many; she made Albert W. Grant (DD-649) seaworthy again in only two days after the destroyer had flooded from the 19 shell hits received in the Battle of Surigao Strait. Such duty in San Pedro Bay and Lingayen Gulf was followed by assignment to harbor clearance at Manila through the spring of 1945.

=== Awarded the Navy Unit Commendation ===
Cable's devoted and skillful service in the Philippines was recognized with the award of the Navy Unit Commendation.

=== Supporting the Borneo invasion ===
Cable stood out of Manila Bay on 30 May 1945 where her repair facilities helped ready ships for the Borneo invasion. She steamed to Balikpapan for frontline support in July, and in August returned to the Philippines for continued service through 6 March 1946.

=== End-of-war activity ===
Homeward bound, she towed non-self-propelled Barracks ship APL-18 from Pearl Harbor to San Diego, where she arrived 28 July 1946 for local operations until 28 January 1947. Proceeding to the U.S. East Coast, Cable carried out salvage, rescue, and towing assignments in New England waters until 15 September 1947.

== Post-war decommissioning ==
In 1947 she was decommissioned at Boston, Massachusetts. She was loaned for commercial service the same day. She was sunk as a target on 7 August 1978.

== Awards ==
In addition to the Navy Unit Commendation, Cable received three battle stars for World War II service.
