= USS Curb =

Diver-class rescue and salvage ship

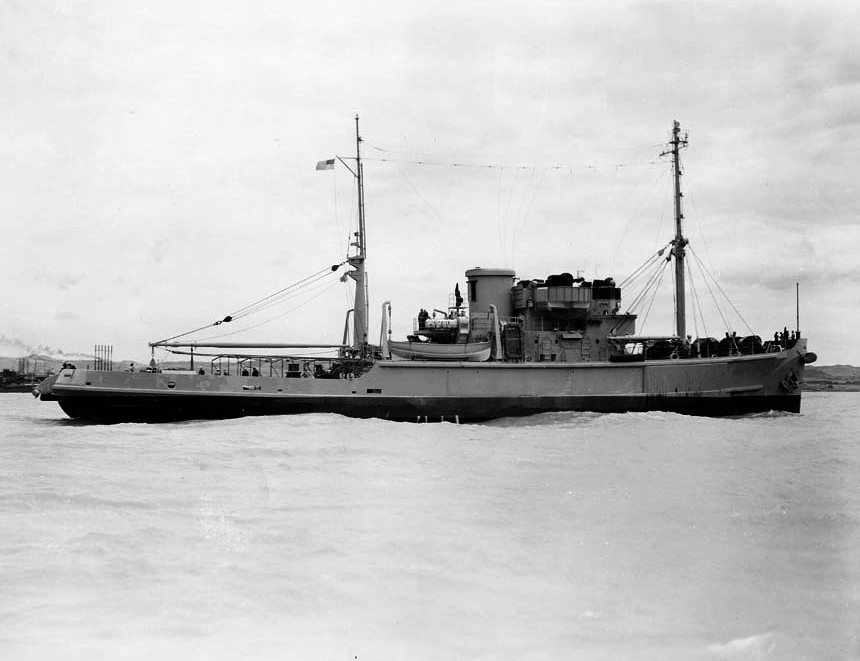
- Curb on trials in the Napa River just after her commissioning

History

United States
- Name: USS Curb
- Builder: Basalt Rock Company
- Launched: 24 April 1943
- Commissioned: 12 May 1944
- Decommissioned: 20 December 1946
- In service: 10 May 1947
- Stricken: 30 April 1981
- Fate: Sunk as an artificial reef off Key West, Florida, 1983

General characteristics
- Tonnage: 1,441 tons
- Displacement: 1,630 tons
- Length: 213 ft 6 in (65.07 m)
- Beam: 39 ft (12 m)
- Draught: 14 ft 4 in (4.37 m)
- Propulsion: diesel-electric, twin screws, 2,780 hp
- Speed: 15 knots (28 km/h)
- Complement: 120
- Armament: four 40 mm guns, four 0.5 in (12.7 mm) machine guns

USS Curb (ARS-21) was a Diver-class rescue and salvage ship commissioned by the U.S. Navy during World War II. Her task was to come to the aid of stricken vessels.

Curb (ARS-21) was launched 24 April 1943 by Basalt Rock Company in Napa, California; sponsored by Mrs. H. Peterson; and commissioned 12 May 1944.

== Service history ==
Curb sailed from San Diego, California, 22 June 1944, delivered a battle raft to Eglin Field, Florida, and arrived at Norfolk, Virginia 26 July for war duty in the Atlantic Ocean. On 26 August she sailed for Argentia, Newfoundland, arriving 25 August for towing and salvage duties until she returned to Boston, Massachusetts, 16 November. She had similar duty at Bermuda from 27 November 1944 to 12 January 1945, serving the great number of ships training or assembling for convoys there.

After a brief overhaul at Norfolk, Curb sailed on towing duty to San Francisco, California, arriving 3 April. On 16 April 1945 she departed San Francisco to operate in Alaskan waters until putting into Seattle, Washington, 14 March 1946. On 9 August she arrived at San Pedro, California, for towing duty, voyaging twice to Bremerton, Washington, until 28 October when she cleared for Orange, Texas, arriving 23 November.

Curb was decommissioned 20 December 1946 and loaned to a private salvage firm 10 May 1947 and was returned for lay up in the Reserve Fleet (date unknown). On 30 April 1981, she was struck from the Naval Register. Final Disposition: scrapped, 23 February 1982, her hulk sunk as an artificial reef off Key West, Florida, 23 November 1983.

The wreck lies at: 24°26.212′N 81°46.127′W
