= USS Safeguard (ARS-25) =

US Navy rescue and salvage ship

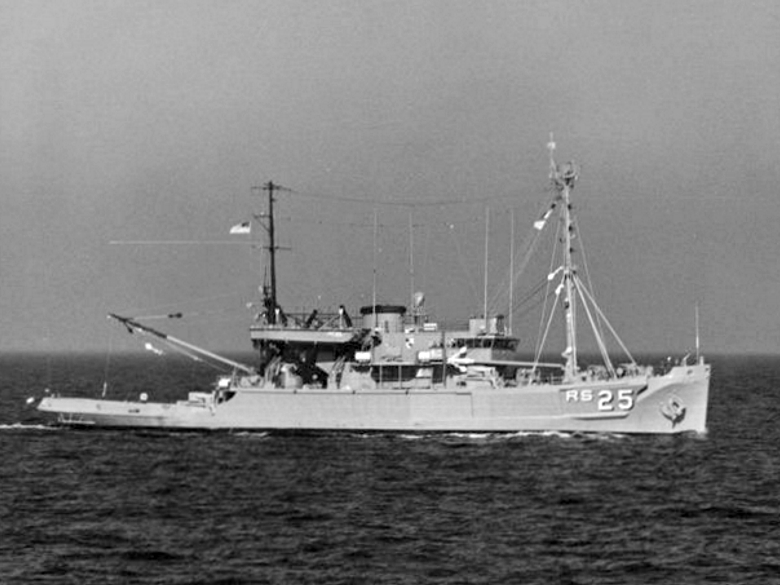

History

United States
- Builder: Basalt Rock Company
- Laid down: 5 June 1943
- Launched: 20 November 1943
- Commissioned: 30 September 1944
- Decommissioned: 12 December 1947
- In service: 13 February 1952
- Out of service: date unknown
- Stricken: 6 August 1987
- Fate: Transferred to Turkey.

Turkey
- Name: TCG Işın (A-589)
- Acquired: 28 September 1979
- Decommissioned: 30 March 2017
- Identification: Code letters TBEX
- Fate: Decommissioned (2017), Sunk as target (2021)

General characteristics
- Displacement: 1,650 tons
- Length: 213 ft 6 in (65.07 m)
- Beam: 39 ft (12 m)
- Draught: 14 ft 8 in (4.47 m)
- Propulsion: diesel-electric, twin screws, 2,780hp
- Speed: 15 knots
- Complement: 120
- Armament: four 40 mm guns

USS Safeguard (ARS-25) was a Diver-class rescue and salvage ship in service with the United States Navy from 1944 to 1947 and from 1952 to 1979. She was then transferred to Turkey where she served as TCG Işın (A-589) until 2017.

== History ==
Safeguard was laid down on 5 June 1943 by the Basalt Rock Company in Napa, California; launched on 20 November 1943; and commissioned on 30 September 1944 at the Southern Pacific Docks, Vallejo, California.

=== United States Navy (1944–1979) ===
==== World War II ====
Following shakedown out of San Diego, California, Safeguard called at San Pedro, Los Angeles, and San Francisco before commencing the first of many deep water towing operations on 23 December. With YC-1165 and YC-1166 in tow, she arrived at Pearl Harbor on 3 January 1945. Escorted by PC-125Jt and SC-1033, she departed Pearl for Eniwetok on the 15th, this time with ARD-25 in tow. Until 1 March, she operated in the area of Tanapag Harbor.

Safeguard later moved on to the Ryūkyūs. At Okinawa, she conducted at-random salvage operations in the wake of war and typhoons. Although towing operations in Buckner Bay took up much of her time in the months immediately following the end of the war, she also continued salvage work. On 20 November, after continued attempts, she refloated ARD-21, a typhoon victim, at Nago Wan, Okinawa.

Departing the Ryukyus on 28 March 1946 for Shanghai, China, Safeguard extended her salvage and towing capabilities to Taku, China, on 13 April and then to Pusan, Korea, and the Amami-O-Shima Islands. Following several months of operations in Chinese and Japanese waters, she towed YR-68 from Hong Kong to Samar, Philippine Islands, in mid-June. There she added section G of AFDM-5 to her tow and continued on to Pearl Harbor on 29 July in company with three YTBs. She was en route to San Francisco beginning 21 August for a three-month overhaul at Mare Island, California.

After service in the Aleutians in the spring of 1947, Safeguard arrived at Pearl Harbor on 1 July. She then went on to Kwajalein Atoll, the Marshalls, for salvage operations after the nuclear tests held there. The mission involved considerable diving and the inspection of the underwater surfaces of many grounded vessels. Safeguard departed Kwajalein on 12 November and headed via Pearl Harbor for San Diego. She decommissioned on 12 December 1947 and entered the San Diego Group of the Pacific Reserve Fleet.

==== Cold War ====
After the outbreak of war in Korea, Safeguard was ordered activated. Recommissioned on 13 February 1952, she proceeded to Pearl Harbor for a post-commissioning overhaul that took her into mid-August. She arrived at Sasebo, Japan, on 3 September 1952 and again commenced salvage and towing operations in Japanese and Korean waters. She delivered urgently needed cargo to USS Consolation (AH-15) at Inchon on 28 December; and, on 6 January 1953, she stood by USS Missouri (BB-63) during shore bombardment.

Between May and December 1953, Safeguard underwent overhaul at Pearl Harbor. Following the end of the Korean War, she continued to engage in fleet salvage operations and regular WestPac deployments. In the summer of 1955 and 1956, she operated out of Seattle, Washington, provisioning DEW-line outposts.

Safeguard relieved USS Current (ARS-22) on station in the South China Sea off the coast of South Vietnam on 25 August 1964. Interruptions during this duty took her to Subic Bay and Hong Kong. Arriving at Pearl Harbor on 27 October, she conducted local operations through the following summer. In the first half of 1964 she also assisted in Operation Sailor Hat off the coast of Kahoolawe with target ship moorings. She was again en route to WestPac on 17 August 1965 for operations that took her to Japanese, Korean, and Vietnamese waters.

Arriving at Pearl Harbor on 9 March 1966, Safeguard commenced upkeep and mid-Pacific operations. For example, during September and October 1966, she salvaged a 10,000-ton commercial barge which had grounded at Wake Island during a storm. She then towed the barge 2,000 miles to Honolulu. Into 1974, Safeguard has continued to provide Fleet support services from her home port of Pearl Harbor and through her regular WestPac deployments. Safeguard was decommissioned on 25 September 1979.

=== Turkish Navy (1979–2017) ===
Safeguard was transferred under the Security Assistance Program to Turkey on 28 September 1979 and renamed TCG Işın (A-589). She was decommissioned on 30 March 2017. Sunk as target in June 2021 as part of Atmaca anti-ship missile trials.

== U.S. Military awards and honors ==
Safeguard received one battle star for World War II service:

- Okinawa Gunto operations

During the Korean War she received the Presidential Unit Citation and five battle stars. Two are shown below:

- Korean Defense Summer-Fall 1952
- Third Korean Winter

For service in Vietnam she was reported to have received nine campaign stars. However, ten are noted below:

- Vietnam Defense
- Vietnamese Counteroffensive
- Vietnamese Counteroffensive – Phase III
- Vietnamese Counteroffensive – Phase V
- Vietnamese Counteroffensive – Phase VI
- Vietnam Winter-Sprint 1970
- Sanctuary Counteroffensive
- Vietnamese Counteroffensive – Phase VII
- Consolidation I
- Vietnamese Ceasefire

Safeguard's crew was eligible for the following medals, citations, ribbons, and other honors (listed in order of precedence):

- Presidential Unit Citation
- Meritorious Unit Commendation
- China Service Medal (extended)
- American Campaign Medal
- Asiatic–Pacific Campaign Medal (1)
- World War II Victory Medal
- Navy Occupation Service Medal (with Asia clasp)
- National Defense Service Medal (2)
- Korean Service Medal (2)
- Armed Forces Expeditionary Medal (2-Korea)
- Vietnam Service Medal (10)
- Humanitarian Service Medal (1- Entewaktek Cleanup, 1-Boat People)
- Republic of Vietnam Gallantry Cross Unit Citation (3)
- United Nations Service Medal
- Vietnam Campaign Medal
- Korean War Service Medal (retroactive)
