= USS Avoyel =

Tugboat of the United States Navy

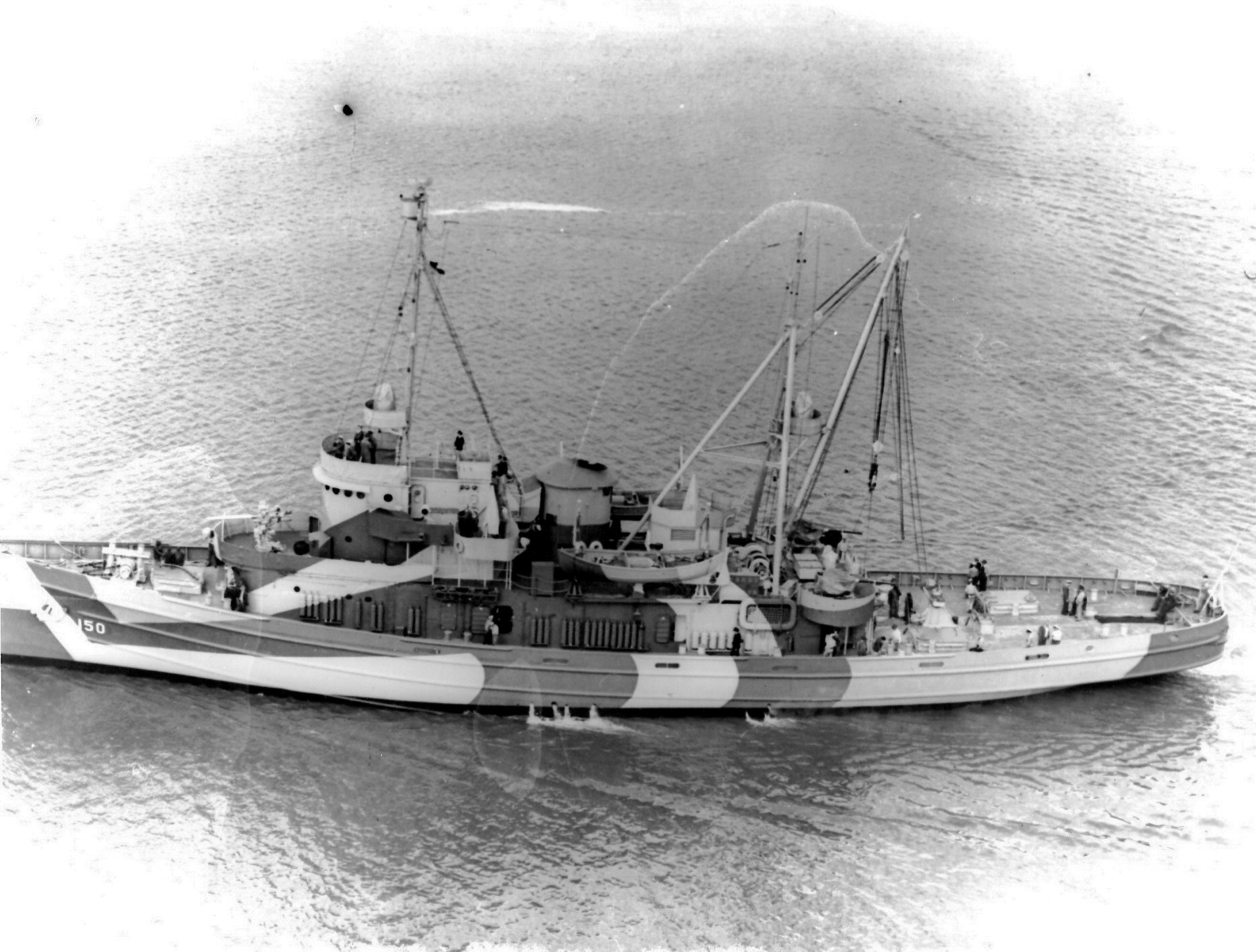
- USS Avoyel (AT-150), underway on the Cooper River at Charleston, S.C., during builders trials in December 1945. Note Measure 32/17Ax camouflage.

History

United States
- Name: Avoyel
- Builder: Charleston Shipbuilding & Dry Dock Co.
- Laid down: 25 March 1944
- Launched: 9 August 1944
- Commissioned: 8 January 1945
- Decommissioned: 11 January 1947
- Reclassified: USCGC Avoyel (WMEC-150)
- Reinstated: 1956
- Home port: Eureka, California
- Fate: Placed in commercial service
- Status: Unknown

General characteristics
- Class & type: Navajo-class fleet tug
- Displacement: 1,205 long tons (1,224 t) light; 1,646 long tons (1,672 t) full
- Length: 205 ft (62 m)
- Beam: 38 ft 6 in (11.73 m)
- Draft: 15 ft 4 in (4.67 m)
- Propulsion: Diesel-electric; 4 × General Motors 12-278A diesel main engines driving 4 × General Electric generators and 3 × General Motors 3-268A auxiliary services engines, single screw
- Speed: 16 knots (18 mph; 30 km/h)
- Complement: 8 officers, 68 enlisted men
- Armament: 1 × 3"/50 caliber gun; 2 × 40 mm guns; 2 × 20 mm guns

USS Avoyel (ATF-150) was a Navajo-class fleet tug built for the United States Navy during World War II. She was the only U.S. Naval vessel to bear the name.

Avoyel was laid down 25 March 1944 by the Charleston Shipbuilding and Dry Dock Company of Charleston, South Carolina; launched on 9 August 1944; sponsored by Mrs. George E. Goodman; and commissioned at Charleston Navy Yard on 8 January 1945.

== Service history ==
Following shakedown training in Chesapeake Bay, the tug reported to Norfolk Navy Yard, Portsmouth, Virginia, for post-shakedown availability. Upon completion of the yard period, the tug was ordered to proceed to the Hudson River, which had frozen to a depth of two to three feet. Though not designed as an icebreaker, Avoyel was able to clear a path to Long Island so that ammunition barges could be moved down the river. When this assignment was finished, the vessel returned to Norfolk.

In early March, the tug sailed for New Orleans, Louisiana, where she picked up a tow and pulled it to Gulfport, Mississippi, for loading. Avoyel departed the gulf coast on 20 March, bound for the Pacific. She transited the Panama Canal and continued on to the South Pacific. The ship paused at Bora Bora, Society Islands, to refuel before reaching Seeadler Harbor, Manus Island, on 13 May. Upon her arrival there, the tug reported to Commander, Service Force 10, for duty. On 15 May, the tug was redesignated ATF-150.

During the remaining months of World War II, Avoyel carried out various towing operations among the Philippine Islands; Hollandia, New Guinea; Ulithi, Caroline Islands; Guam, Mariana Islands; Okinawa; and Eniwetok, Marshall Islands. Following the Japanese capitulation on 15 August, the tug got underway with Task Group 95.4 to clear mines from the waters of the Yellow Sea, off the coast of Korea. Avoyel sank several mines with rifle fire; and, on 7 September, Allied occupation forces began steaming through the cleared area toward the Korean mainland.

The tug anchored at Sasebo, Japan, on 16 September, and operated in the Sasebo area for the next four months, performing towing jobs and making resupply and refueling runs. On one occasion, Avoyel lost her 3,000-pound starboard anchor and 54 fathoms of chain in the East China Sea. This was temporarily replaced, however, with a comparable anchor salvaged from a wrecked Japanese vessel. During this period, Avoyel detonated a total of 47 mines swept clear of nearby minefields, and supplied over 160,000 gallons of distilled water to other vessels in the fleet.

On 5 February 1946, the ship delivered supplies to a destroyer tender anchored off Wakayama, and moored briefly with her sister ship USS Chawasha. On 10 February she returned to Sasebo, and underwent repairs alongside USS Hoist before sailing for Hawaii on 2 March with ARD-22 in tow. A sick crewman, however, forced an emergency detour to Saipan, after which her destination was changed to Eniwetok. Upon arrival there, Avoyel anchored ARD-22 so that she could assist YC-827, which was adrift 90 miles west of Eniwetok. Upon returning to Eniwetok with the Lighter, the ship made plans to assist USS Jicarilla, which had lost its tow, AFD-17. Sighting the wayward drydock on 26 March, Avoyel towed the vessel to Guam, where she rode out a typhoon warning. While at Guam, the ship had a minor hole in her starboard side repaired and a few alterations conducted. Finally, on 12 May 1946, the ship resumed her interrupted trip to Pearl Harbor, and soon thereafter for the Canal Zone. The vessel retransited the Panama Canal on 12 July and reached New Orleans on the 28th, where the ship underwent a preinactivation overhaul. On 17 October, Avoyel proceeded to Orange, Texas, and was placed out of commission, in reserve, on 11 January 1947.

== Transfer to the U.S. Coast Guard ==
On 9 July 1956, both the Avoyel and USS Chilula were removed from the Beaumont Reserve Fleet, and towed to Curtis Bay, Maryland, for conversion and transfer to the United States Coast Guard. Assigned to duty at Eureka, California, the ship continued to provide valuable firefighting, salvage, and rescue services through 1967. On 10 January 1969, the ship was involved in an accidental collision with USCGC Resolute during high-line drills, which resulted in a six-foot hole on the port side of the latter vessel courtesy of the Avoyel's starboard anchor. Though the damage to Avoyel was classified as "moderate", the incident apparently hastened her decommissioning, which occurred on 30 September 1969. Subsequently sold in 1970 to Gulf Atlantic Oceanographic Research, Inc., of Pensacola, Florida, Avoyel continued to serve in a commercial capacity for the remainder of her career. Her final disposition is unknown.
