= USS Jicarilla =

Abnaki-class tugboat

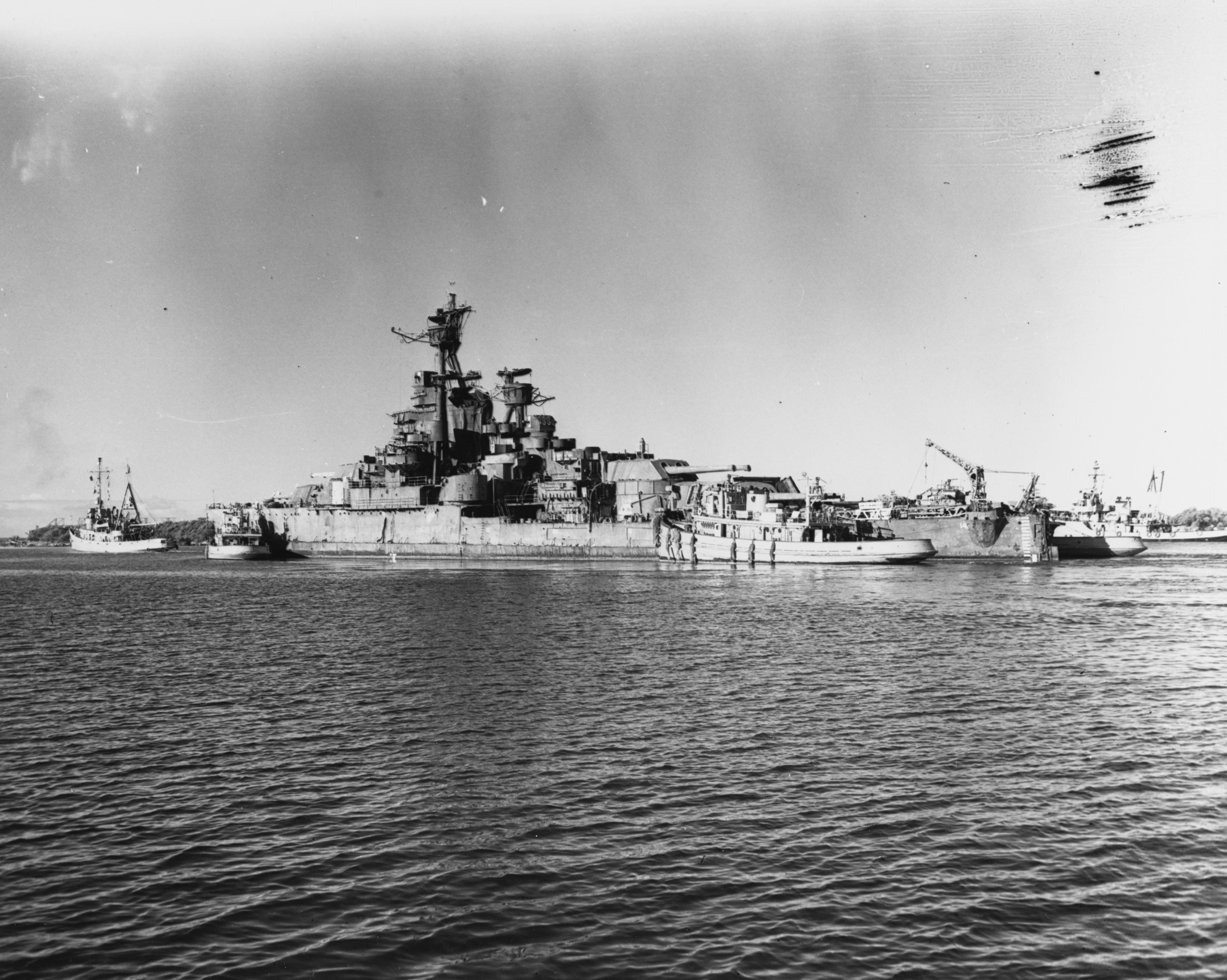
- USS Jicarilla towing Nevada, 1948

History

United States
- Name: Jicarilla
- Namesake: Jicarilla Apache
- Builder: Charleston Shipbuilding & Drydock Co.
- Laid down: 25 August 1943
- Launched: 25 February 1944
- Sponsored by: Mrs. R. L. Harley
- Commissioned: 26 June 1944
- Decommissioned: 14 June 1950
- Stricken: 1 July 1963
- Identification: Callsign: NWVU; Hull number: ATF-104
- Honours and awards: See Awards
- Fate: Sold to Colombia, 1979

History

Colombia
- Name: Sebastián De Belalcázar
- Namesake: Sebastián De Belalcázar
- Acquired: 1 March 1979
- Decommissioned: 2004
- Identification: Pennant number: RM-73
- Home port: Buenaventura
- Fate: Sunk as artificial reef, 2 September 2004

General characteristics
- Class & type: Abnaki-class tugboat
- Displacement: 1,589 t (1,564 long tons), standard; 1,675 t (1,649 long tons), full
- Length: 205 ft 0 in (62.48 m)
- Beam: 38 ft 6 in (11.73 m)
- Draft: 15 ft 4 in (4.67 m)
- Installed power: 1 × shaft; 3,600 shp (2,700 kW)
- Propulsion: 4 × General Motors 12-278A diesel engines; 4 × General Electric generators; 3 × General Motors 3-268A auxiliary services engines
- Speed: 16.5 knots (30.6 km/h; 19.0 mph)
- Range: 15,000 nmi (28,000 km; 17,000 mi) at 8 knots (15 km/h; 9.2 mph)
- Complement: 85 officers and enlisted
- Armament: 1 × single 3"/50 caliber gun; 2 × twin Bofors 40 mm guns; 2 × single Oerlikon 20 mm cannons

USS Jicarilla (ATF-104) was Abnaki-class tugboat during the World War II. The ship was later sold to Colombia as ARC Sebastián De Belalcázar (RM-73). Her namesake is a group of the Apache tribe found in the southwestern United States.

== Design and description ==
The ship is displaced 1,589 tonnes (1,564 long tons) at standard load and 1,675 tonnes (1,649 long tons) at deep load The ships measured 205 feet (62.5 m) long overall with a beam of 38 feet 6 inches (11.7 m). They had a draft of 15 feet 4 inches (4.7 m). The ships' complement consisted of 85 officers and ratings.

The ships had two General Motors 12-278A diesel engines, one shaft. The engines produced a total of 3,600 shaft horsepower (2,700 kW) and gave a maximum speed of 16.5 knots (30.6 km/h; 19.0 mph). They carried a maximum of 10 tonnes (10 long tons) of fuel oil that gave them a range of 15,000 nmi (28,000 km; 17,000 mi) at 8 knots (15 km/h; 9.2 mph).

The Abnaki class was armed with a 3"/50 caliber gun anti-aircraft gun, two single-mount Oerlikon 20 mm cannon and two twin-gun mounts for Bofors 40 mm gun.

== Construction and career ==
The ship was built at the Charleston Shipbuilding & Drydock Co. at Charleston, South Carolina. She was laid down on 25 August 1943 and launched on 25 February 1944. The ship was commissioned on 26 June 1944. She was reclassified ATF-104 on 15 May 1944.

=== Service in the United States Navy ===
Following shakedown in Chesapeake Bay, Jicarilla departed New York towing barges 9 August 1944, bound for San Francisco via the Panama Canal. She arrived 22 September, but sailed again seven days later towing ARD-21 to Pearl Harbor. The tug remained in Hawaiian waters until November doing salvage and towing work, including the difficult task of pulling SS Antigua off a reef from 14 to 21 October. Departing Pearl Harbor on 7 November, she towed barges of supplies to advance bases at Eniwetok and Ulithi, arriving the latter island on 3 December.

With the campaign to recapture the Philippines well underway, Jicarilla sailed on 10 December as part of the refueling group for Task Force 38, the fast carrier group then supporting the Philippines operation. Refueling began early on 17 December but had to be broken off as weather worsened. Anxious to top off his destroyers and support the Mindoro operation. Admiral Halsey continued attempts to refuel until the next morning, when Jicarilla and the rest of the fueling group turned south. The fleet tug rode out the typhoon and returned to Ulithi oni 22 December, but the great storm sank three gallant destroyers, two of them from Jicarilla's group. Undaunted, the fast carrier force resumed its punishing attacks on the Philippines.

Jicarilla arrived at Leyte on 7 January to support the next amphibious operation at Lingayen Gulf. She sailed on 9 January with a convoy of LCI's and LST's; despite numerous air attacks by the Japanese, she arrived at Mangarin Bay 2 days later. The tug remained there until 22 January performing salvage and firefighting duties on the many damaged and beached landing craft. She arrived Ulithi on 27 January. After towing voyages between Ulithi and the Marianas, Jicarilla sailed from Ulithi on 9 April pulling a much-needed floating drydock to Okinawa.

The veteran tug arrived at Kerama Retto, repair base for the Okinawa operation, 16 April, and remained there to perform salvage work on ships damaged in the desperate kamikaze attacks. She sailed on 20 April with Idaho, arrived at Guam on 25 April, and from there returned to Ulithi on 30 April. After towing work at the advance base, she sailed for Leyte on 19 May and arrived Okinawa again on 13 June. As the struggle for the island continued, she worked directly off the Hagushi beaches, towing landing craft and performing salvage work. Thus, she contributed importantly to the eventual victory by helping to keep the massive fleet afloat and operating.

Jicarilla remained at Okinawa until departing for Wakayama, Japan, 21 September. Four days later she arrived, and performed towing duties in connection with the occupation operations until returning to Okinawa on 14 October. After a voyage to Guam, the ship steamed to Iwo Jima on 4 December to salvage the ARL-32. In the months that followed, she was engaged in towing and salvage in the Marshalls and Carolines, arriving Pearl Harbor on 24 April 1946.

Jicarilla spent the summer of 1946 in the Marshall Islands in support of Operation Crossroads, the history-making atomic test series in the Pacific. Returning to the United States on 14 September, she performed towing duties on the West Coast and at the Canal Zone until 23 January 1947, when she sailed again for the Far East from Bremerton, Washington. The ship operated out of Pearl Harbor until May, sailing on the 14th to Guam. Jicarilla arrived Qingdao, China, 17 June for towing and salvage work in connection with the American Marines ashore. In the months that followed, she continued to steam between American Pacific bases and China. After a month at Pearl Harbor, she returned to Long Beach on 18 February 1948. On 26 July, Jicarilla towed the former battleship Nevada out to sea to be sunk as a target.

The ocean tug conducted operations on the Pacific coast and out of Pearl Harbor until arriving Yokosuka on 25 January 1949. She again supported the American effort to bring peace and security to China and the Far East, before returning to Long Beach on 19 August 1949. After additional towing on the West Coast, she decommissioned at San Diego on 14 June 1950 and entered the Pacific Reserve Fleet.

=== Service in the Colombian Navy ===
In August 1962, Jicarilla was transferred to the Maritime Commission, National Defense Reserve Fleet at Suisun Bay, California, where she would later be sold to Colombia on 1 March 1979, as ARC Sebastián De Belalcázar (RM-73).

In 1979, she provided aid to the population during the Tumaco earthquake.

In 1981, she became the only Colombian Navy ship to see action after sinking the M-19 arms smuggling ship Karina, in which gun fire fights broke out.

She was put out of service and later towed out to be sunk as an artificial reef off Punta Huina, Bahía Solana, to be sunk as an artificial reef on 2 September 2004.

== Awards ==
The ship has a total of 2 battle stars throughout her career.

- China Service Medal (extended)
- American Campaign Medal
- Asiatic-Pacific Campaign Medal (2 battle stars)
- World War II Victory Medal
- Navy Occupation Service Medal (with Asia clasp)
- Philippine Liberation Medal
