= Basalt Rock Company =

Former American industrial company

Coordinates: 38.26433°N 122.270622°W

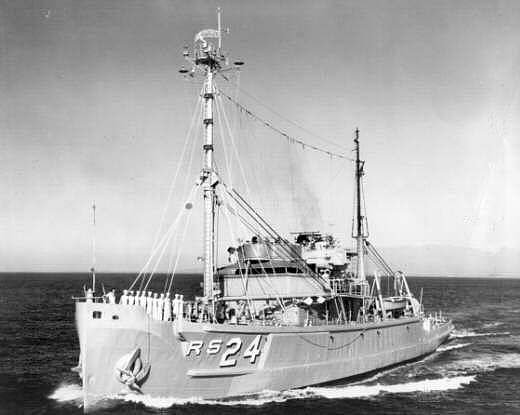
USS Grasp (ARS-24) built by Basalt Rock Company in 1944

Basalt Rock Company was a multifaceted industrial operation that was founded in 1920. The company started as a rock quarrying operation located a few miles south of Napa, California near Rocktram adjacent to the Napa River. It later branched out into the ship building business in 1941 when it started building ships for the U.S. Navy for use during World War II. Following the war, the plant built 30 miles of pipe for the City of Napa's pipeline from Lake Hennessey.

In 1950, the company took title of a cement plant formerly owned by Standard Portland Cement Company in what is now American Canyon, California. The cement plant remained in operation until 1978. As of 2001, the city was evaluating the plant for future use.

== Successor companies of earlier corporate sales ==
The company's steel making plant was purchased by Kaiser Steel in 1955. The plant changed hands again in 1988 when it was purchased by Oregon Steel Mills and remained in operation as Napa Pipe until 2004. Developers proposed turning the site into a housing development, but faced strong opposition and controversy over the project.

The rock and sand portion of the company was purchased by Dillingham Construction in the early 1970s. It was acquired by Syar Industries in 1986, and as of 2018 remains in operation as Syar's Napa Quarry. In 2013 Syar announced that it was applying for permits to double the output of the quarry from 1 million to 2 million tons of aggregate.

== Ships built ==
Basalt Rock Company ships built for World War 2:

Hull #	Ship ID	Name	Customer	Type	Tons	Length ft	Delivered	Notes
	579393		Basalt Rock Co.	Barge	120	360	1938	Later Basalt No. 1
		YC 697	US Navy	Lighter	170	110	Jan-41	
		YC 698	US Navy	Lighter	170	110	Jan-41	
		YC 699	US Navy	Lighter	170	110	Feb-41	
		YC 705	US Navy	Lighter	170	110	Feb-41	
		YC 706	US Navy	Lighter	170	110	Feb-41	
		YC 711	US Navy	Lighter	170	110	Mar-41	
		YC 712	US Navy	Lighter	170	110	Mar-41	
		YC 713	US Navy	Lighter	170	110	Mar-41	
		PAB 1	CPNAB	Freight Barge	400	150	Apr-41	Later YC 1026, lost 1948
		PAB 2	CPNAB	Freight Barge	400	150	Apr-41	Later YC 1027
		PAB 3	CPNAB	Freight Barge	400	150	May-41	
		PAB 4	CPNAB	Freight Barge	400	150	May-41	
		PAB 5	CPNAB	Freight Barge	400	150	May-41	Later YC 1028
		PAB 6	CPNAB	Freight Barge	400	150	Jun-41	
		PAB 7	CPNAB	Freight Barge	400	150	Jun-41	Later YC 1029
		PAB 8	CPNAB	Freight Barge	400	150	Jun-41	
22		Crownblock (YO 48)	US Navy	Yard Oiler	950	235	28-Aug-42	Sunk as target 1977
23		Whipstock (YO 49)	US Navy	Yard Oiler	950	235	23-Sep-42	Scrapped 1975
	266745	PAB 9	CPNAB	Freight Barge	400	150	Jul-41	Later YC 1030, Graham #12
		PAB 10	CPNAB	Freight Barge	400	150	Jul-41	Later YC 1031
		PAB 11	CPNAB	Freight Barge	400	150	Jul-41	Later YC 1032
	257154	PAB 12	CPNAB	Freight Barge	400	150	Aug-41	Later Sause Bros. 12
28	284504	YF 295	US Navy	Freighter	197	126	Oct-41	Later Lupe, f/v Labrador, active
29		YC 735	US Navy	Lighter	170	110	Dec-41	
30		YC 736	US Navy	Lighter	170	110	Dec-41	
31		YC 737	US Navy	Lighter	170	110	Dec-41	
32		YC 755	US Navy	Lighter	170	110	Dec-41	Active in Pago Pago
33		YC 756	US Navy	Lighter	170	110	Dec-41	
34		YC 757	US Navy	Lighter	170	110	Dec-41	
35	175468	PAB 13	CPNAB	Freight Barge	666	144	Sep-41	Later CC Co. 23
36	175467	PAB 14	CPNAB	Freight Barge	666	144	Sep-41	Later CC Co. 14
37		PAB 15	CPNAB	Freight Barge	450	124	Oct-41	
38		PAB 16	CPNAB	Freight Barge	450	124	Oct-41	
		Caledonian Salvor (BARS 1)	US Navy	Rescue Ship	1,897	213	22-Aug-42	To Britain 1942, to Australia 1943, returned 1946, sold 1947 as Sudbury II, later Lady Pacific, burnt and lost 1982
		Cambrian Salvor (BARS 2)	US Navy	Rescue Ship	1,897	213	7-Sep-42	To Britain 1943, to Australia 1943, returned 1946, sold 1947 as Caribische Zee, later Collinsea, Francois C, Ras Deira, scrapped 1981
		Atlantic Salvor (BARS 3)	US Navy	Rescue Ship	1,897	213	24-Oct-42	Intended for Britain but retained as USS Clamp (ARS 33), to NDRF 1999
	576547	Pacific Salvor (BARS 4)	US Navy	Rescue Ship	1,897	213	24-Oct-42	Intended for Britain but retained as USS Gear (ARS 34), scrapped 1982
43		Diver (ARS 5)	US Navy	Rescue Ship	1,897	213	23-Oct-43	Sold 1949 as Rescue, later Rescue M, Grand Day, Rescue M, scrapped 1986
44		Escape (ARS 6)	US Navy	Rescue Ship	1,897	213	20-Nov-43	To USCG 1946 as Escape (WAT 6/WMEC 6), scrapped 2009
45		Grapple (ARS 7)	US Navy	Rescue Ship	1,897	213	16-Dec-43	To Taiwan 1977 as Da Hu (ARS 327, later 552), active
46		Preserver (ARS 8)	US Navy	Rescue Ship	1,897	213	11-Jan-44	Scrapped 2005
47		Shackle (ARS 9)	US Navy	Rescue Ship	1,897	213	5-Feb-44	To USCG 1946 as Acushnet (WAT 167/WMEC 167), active
		YC 811	US Navy	Lighter	145	110	Jun-42	Destroyed 1946
		YC 812	US Navy	Lighter	145	110	Jun-42	
		YC 822	US Navy	Lighter	170	110	Sep-42	
		YC 823	US Navy	Lighter	170	110	Sep-42	
		YC 824	US Navy	Lighter	170	110	Oct-42	
		YC 825	US Navy	Lighter	170	110	Oct-42	
		YC 826	US Navy	Lighter	170	110	Oct-42	
		YC 827	US Navy	Lighter	170	110	Nov-42	Destroyed 1946
		YC 828	US Navy	Lighter	170	110	Dec-42	
	254678	Cable (ARS 19)	US Navy	Rescue Ship	1,441	213	6-Mar-44	Sunk as target 1978
		Chain (ARS 20)	US Navy	Rescue Ship	1,441	213	31-Mar-44	Reclassified as AGOR 17 1958, scrapped 1979
	254289	Curb (ARS 21)	US Navy	Rescue Ship	1,441	213	12-May-44	Reefed off Key West FL 1983
		Current (ARS 22)	US Navy	Rescue Ship	1,441	213	14-Jun-44	Scrapped 1975
		Deliver (ARS 23)	US Navy	Rescue Ship	1,441	213	18-Jul-44	To South Korea 1979 as Gumi (ARS 26), active
		Grasp (ARS 24)	US Navy	Rescue Ship	1,441	213	22-Aug-44	To South Korea 1978 as Chang Won (ARS 25), active
		Safeguard (ARS 25)	US Navy	Rescue Ship	1,441	213	30-Sep-44	To Turkey 1979 as Isin (A 589), active
		Seize (ARS 26)	US Navy	Rescue Ship	1,441	213	3-Nov-44	To USCG 1946 as Yocona (WAT 168/WMEC 168), sunk as target 2006
		Snatch (ARS 27)	US Navy	Rescue Ship	1,441	213	11-Dec-44	Reclassified as AGOR 18 1967, scrapped 1971
		YF 339	US Navy	Yard Freighter	435	133	Apr-44	To USCG 1947 as White Bush (WAGL 542/WLM 542), to USN as IX 542, sunk as target 2004
		YF 340	US Navy	Yard Freighter	435	133	May-44	Later an inter-island ferry
		YF 341	US Navy	Yard Freighter	435	133	Jun-44	To USCG 1947 as White Holly (WAGL 543/WLM 543), training ship 1998
		YF 420	US Navy	Yard Freighter	435	133	Jul-44	
	252167	YF 421	US Navy	Yard Freighter	435	133	Aug-44	
		YF 449	US Navy	Yard Freighter	300	133	Sep-44	
		YF 450	US Navy	Yard Freighter	300	133	Oct-44	
		YF 451	US Navy	Yard Freighter	300	133	Oct-44	Later YFR 451, sold 1995
		YF 452	US Navy	Yard Freighter	300	133	Nov-44	
		YF 453	US Navy	Yard Freighter	300	133	Dec-44	
		YF 454	US Navy	Yard Freighter	300	133	Jan-45	
		YC 978	US Navy	Lighter	170	110	Jun-44	
		YC 979	US Navy	Lighter	170	110	Jun-44	
		YC 980	US Navy	Lighter	170	110	Aug-44	Active in Pago Pago
		YC 981	US Navy	Lighter	750	142	Aug-44	
	566700	YC 982	US Navy	Lighter	750	142	Sep-44	
		YC 983	US Navy	Lighter	170	110	Sep-44	
		YC 984	US Navy	Lighter	170	110	Nov-44	
		Bolster (ARS 38)	US Navy	Rescue Ship	1,441	213	1-May-45	Scrapped 2011
		Conserver (ARS 39)	US Navy	Rescue Ship	1,441	213	9-Jun-45	Sunk as target 2004
		Hoist (ARS 40)	US Navy	Rescue Ship	1,441	213	21-Jul-45	To Taiwan 1998 as Ta Peng (ARS 549), to Toledo OH as museum 2003, scrapped 2007
		Opportune (ARS 41)	US Navy	Rescue Ship	1,441	213	5-Oct-45	Scrapped 2003
		Reclaimer (ARS 42)	US Navy	Rescue Ship	1,441	213	20-Dec-45	Scrapped 2011
		Recovery (ARS 43)	US Navy	Rescue Ship	1,441	213	14-May-46	To Taiwan 1998 as Da Juen (ARS 556), active

== See also ==
- California during World War II
- Maritime history of California
- Wooden boats of World War 2
