= Reiss (name) =

Reiss is a surname of Old German origin, and was most commonly used by Ashkenazic Jewish people as a metonymic occupational name for a dealer in rice (Yiddish רײַז), or as an ornamental name from the Old High German word Reis ‘twig,’ ‘branch.’

Reiss (often written with the German letter ß (or sharp-s) is mostly originated in Austria and South Germany. The south German or Austrian Reiss is a leftover of a profession name Reußhäusler which could best be translated to maker of charcoal from wood in English. Members of this profession usually have been free residents (in the meaning of not enslaved and not belonging to a Duke or King) and got very early the right to carry a weapon (axe) and a uniform like dress, comparable to miners.

Several Jewish sources for the surname Reiss stem from the German state of Hessen (Frankfurt am Main). Some historians wrote that Reiss could refer to a rice dealer, or to a water-gate operator, or a fisherman who used a fish-trap basket. At the Museum of the Judengasse (Jewish ghetto) in Frankfurt, there is definitive evidence that a Reuse (fish-trap basket or creel) was one of the signs attached to Jewish homes in the streets. According to Dr. Michael Lenarz at the museum, Jewish residents of the ghetto derived their legal names from the names of the house in which they resided.

A next source is reported to be located in the former very North-Northeast Germany. It shall be originated in the Scandinavian languages (Norway/Sweden). There, the ancient Rus is the land around a river from the Baltic Sea to the heart of Russia. So the Reuss Men or Reussians are early Dark Ages Russians. A very final and believable source is from armoured horsemen (without noble title). They are still called Reisige in German. This may come from Ross reitende, German for Horse riding Men).

The surname Reisman is a variant.

== People named Reiss ==
- Abraham Joseph Reiss, the first ordained rabbi of the United States
- Albert Reiss, German operatic tenor
- Albert J. Reiss, American sociologist and criminologist
- Al Reiss,
- Andris Reiss,
- Andy Reiss,
- Anton Josef Reiss (1835–1900), German sculptor
- Anya Reiss, British playwright and screenwriter
- Archibald Reiss,
- Berit Reiss-Andersen, Norwegian lawyer, author and former politician
- Bob Reiss, American author
- Robert Paul "Bob" Reiss, Anglican priest and author
- Bobby Reiss,
- C.D. Reiss,
- Carol Shoshkes Reiss,
- Charles Reiss,
- Chen Reiss, Israeli opera singer
- Christina Reiss,
- Clotilde Reiss, French student held hostage in Iran from 2009–2010
- Dani Reiss,
- Daniel Reiss,
- David Reiss, British founder of the Reiss fashion store chain
- David Reiss (psychiatrist), American psychiatrist
- Diana Reiss, American psychologist
- Dorit Rubinstein Reiss, immunization advocate
- Elisabeth Reiss,
- Ephraim Cohen-Reiss, 20th century founder of the first Hebrew school system in Palestine and the Levant
- Eric Reiss, American author
- Ernst Reiss,
- Fraidy Reiss, American activist against forced marriage
- Francis Reiss, Australian photographer
- Francis R. Reiss, American prelate of the Roman Catholic Church
- Frédéric Reiss,
- Georg Reiss,
- Guy Reiss,
- Hans Reiss (1922–2020), German professor
- Hilde Reiss,
- Ignace Reiss, alias of Soviet spy Ignace Poretsky
- Ira Reiss, American sociologist and sexuality researcher
- James Reiss, American poet
- Janine Reiss, French harpsichordist
- Johanna Reiss, Dutch-American writer and Holocaust survivor
- Jon Reiss,
- Joshua Reiss,
- Katharina Reiss, translation scholar
- Kathryn Reiss,
- Kristina Reiss (born 1952), German mathematics educator
- L. W. Reiss, former Virginia Tech college football coach
- Lionel S. Reiss, Polish-American artist, famous for his depictions of "Jewish Life"
- Louise Reiss, American physician who coordinated the "Baby Tooth Survey"
- Manfred Reiss, Polish-British artist
- Manya Reiss,
- Michael Reiss, British bioethicist, educator, and former Director of Education at the Royal Society
- Michel Reiss, German mathematician
- Mike Reiss, American television writer (The Simpsons)
- Mitchell Reiss, American diplomat
- Morris D. Reiss, American lawyer and politician
- Paul Reiss, educator
- Phyllis Reiss,
- Piotr Reiss, Polish footballer
- Reiss-Alexander Russell-Denny (born 2006), English footballer
- Richard Reiss,
- Roland Reiss,
- Spencer Reiss, American journalist
- Steve Reiss, American Producer
- Steven Reiss, American Psychologist
- Stuart A. Reiss (1921–2014), American set decorator
- Tammi Reiss,
- Thais Reiss,
- Thelma Reiss (1906–1991), British cellist
- Thorleif Reiss,
- Tobias Reiß (born 1968), German politician
- Tom Reiss, American author and journalist
- Uzzi Reiss, Israeli-American physician, pioneering gynecologist, and antiaging specialist
- Vivian Reiss, New York artist
- Wilhelm Reiss,
- William Reiss,
- Winold Reiss, German-American artist
- Yona Reiss, American rabbi and director of the Beth Din of America, the largest rabbinical court in the United States
- Zeev Reiss, Israeli micropaleontologist and geologist

=== In fiction ===
- Historia Reiss, fictional character in the manga/anime Shingeki no Kyojin
- Jonathan Reiss, villain in Lara Croft: Tomb Raider – The Cradle of Life

== See also ==
- Reisman
- Ríos (disambiguation)
