= Reiss =

Reiss may refer to:

- Reiss (surname)
- Reiss (brand), fashion brand
- Reiss, Scotland
- Reiss relation in mathematics
- Steven Reiss an American psychologist
- Reiss (ship), an historic steam tug -- see Northeastern Maritime Historical Foundation
