= USCGC Snohomish =

USCGC Snohomish is the name of the following ships of the United States Coast Guard

- USCGC Snohomish (CG-16), launched in 1908 as USRC Snohomish, designated USCGC Snohomish in 1915 upon formation of the Coast Guard
- USCGC Snohomish (WYTM-98), in commission 1944–1986

== See also ==
- Snohomish (disambiguation)
- USS Snohomish County
