= USCGC Pamlico =

USCGC Pamlico may refer to the following United States Coast Guard cutters that are named for Pamlico Sound:

- USRC Pamlico (1907), a revenue cutter in service from 1907 through 1946. From 1915 to 1946 known as USCGC Pamlico.
- USCGC Pamlico (WLIC-800), a 160–foot inland construction tender in service since 1976.
