= USCGC Stingray =

United States Coast Guard patrol boat

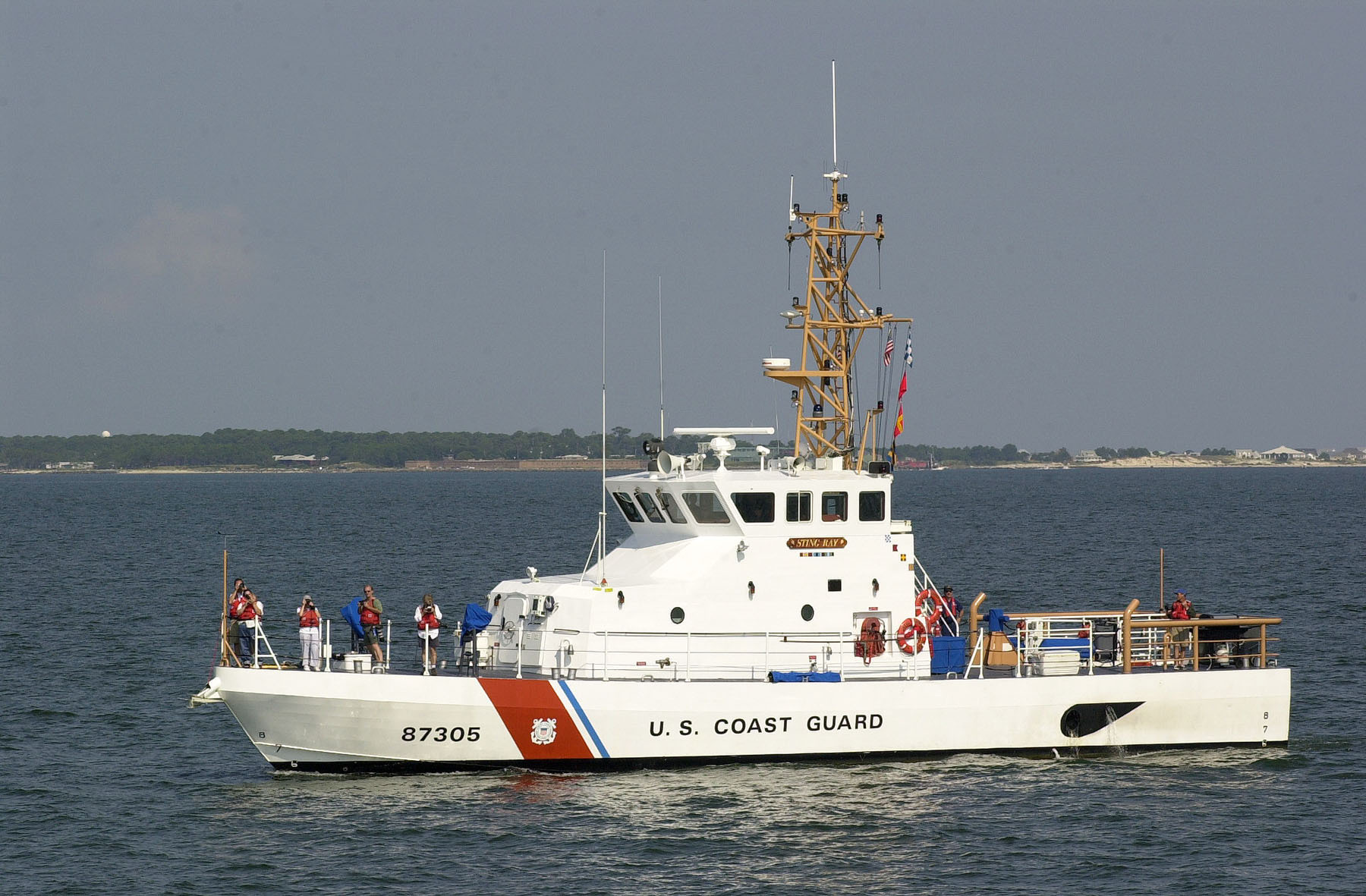
- Stingray in Mobile, Alabama

History

United States
- Name: Stingray
- Namesake: Stingray
- Operator: United States Coast Guard
- Builder: Bollinger Shipyards, Lockport, Louisiana
- Commissioned: March 5, 1999
- Home port: Mobile, Alabama
- Identification: Hull number: WPB-87305
- Status: In active service

General characteristics
- Class & type: Marine Protector-class patrol boat
- Length: 87 ft (27 m)

USCGC Stingray (WPB-87305) is an 87-foot (27 m) Marine Protector-class of the United States Coast Guard, based in Mobile, Alabama. It was commissioned in March 1999. It patrols the northern Gulf of Mexico for Coast Guard Sector Mobile, in an area stretching from the Chandeleur Islands off Louisiana to Carrabelle, Florida. Its missions include search and rescue, law enforcement, fisheries enforcement and environmental protection.

== Design ==
Stingray is one of the Marine Protector-class coastal patrol boats built for the Coast Guard by Bollinger Shipyards of Lockport, Louisiana, under a contract first awarded on March 13, 1996. The class replaced the older 82-foot Point-class cutters. Stingray was commissioned on March 5, 1999. Like the rest of the class, it carries its small pursuit boat on a stern launching ramp.

== Service history ==
On July 4, 2002, Stingray provided harbor patrol in Mobile during Sail Mobile 2002.

In early 2015 Stingray went through 60 days of planned maintenance at the Coast Guard Yard in Baltimore under the 87-foot "Bow-to-Stern" program. The yard delivered it on February 11, 2015, on time and under budget, as the second cutter to complete the program. A painting from the Coast Guard Art Program's 2015 collection, Stingray at Mobile Bay, shows the cutter near the Middle Bay Light on its way into the Gulf to carry out fisheries and environmental protection work and inspections of commercial fishing vessels.

On April 15, 2015, Stingray joined the patrol boats Manowar and Skipjack in a "Patrol Boat Round Up" at the Sector Field Office in Galveston, Texas, a set of training exercises for 87-foot patrol boats from Mobile, Pensacola and Galveston.

In 2016 Stingray was one of four cutters based in Mobile, along with the tenders Saginaw and Barbara Mabrity as well as the patrol boat Cobia.

On August 28, 2021, it operated in Mobile Bay as Coast Guard crews prepared for the arrival of Hurricane Ida.

== See also ==
- Marine Protector-class patrol boat
- List of United States Coast Guard cutters
