= David Reiss =

David Reiss may refer to:

- David Reiss (psychologist) (born 1937), American social psychologist and researcher
- David Reiss (fashion retailer) (born 1943), owner of the British fashion chain Reiss
