= Sycamore-class buoy tender =

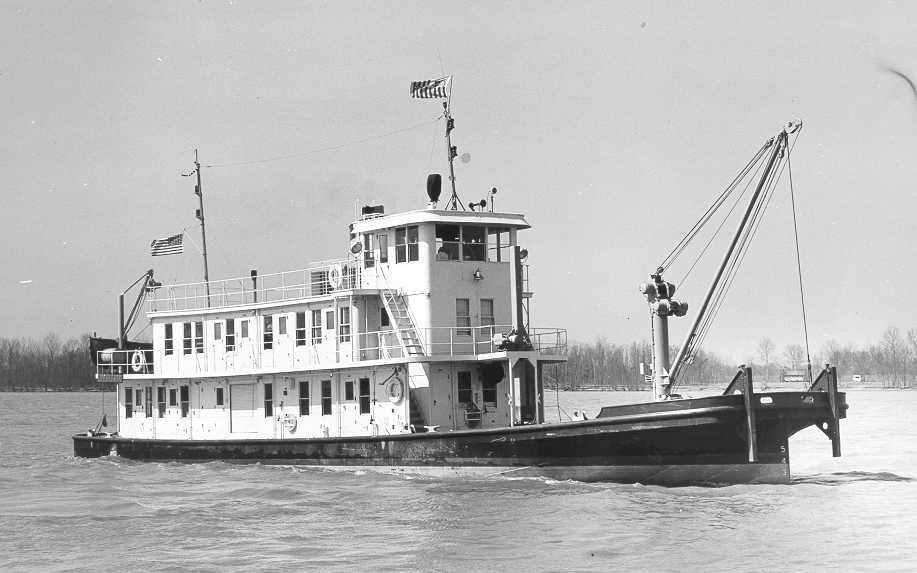
- USCGC Forsythia

Class overview
- Builders: Dubuque Boat & Boiler Works, Dubuque, Iowa (Sycamore & Dogwood); Avondale Marine Ways, Westwego, Louisiana (Forsythia)
- Operators: United States Coast Guard
- Cost: $159,000 each
- Built: 1941–1943
- In commission: 1941–1989
- Completed: 3
- Retired: 3

General characteristics
- Type: Buoy tender
- Displacement: Sycamore & Dogwood : 280 tons; Forsythia : 230 tons
- Length: Sycamore & Dogwood : 113 ft 9 in (34.67 m); Forsythia : 114 ft (35 m)
- Beam: 26 ft (7.9 m)
- Draft: Sycamore & Dogwood : 5 ft 6 in (1.68 m); Forsythia : 5 ft (1.5 m)
- Propulsion: Sycamore & Dogwood : 2 × General Motors diesel engines; 800 bhp (597 kW); Forsythia : 2 × Superior diesel engines; 720 bhp (537 kW); 2 shafts
- Speed: Sycamore & Dogwood : 11 knots (20 km/h; 13 mph); Forsythia : 10 kn (19 km/h; 12 mph)
- Complement: Sycamore & Dogwood : 20; Forsythia : 24
- Armament: Small arms

The Sycamore class were three river buoy tenders of the United States Coast Guard, commissioned in 1941 and 1943. Primarily designed to maintain navigational aids, they also conducted flood relief, search and rescue, and law enforcement operations, as well as pleasure boat safety inspections.

== Ships ==
| Name | Commissioned | Decommissioned |
|---|---|---|
| Sycamore (WAGL-268) | 9 September 1941 | 30 June 1977 |
| Dogwood (WAGL-259) | 17 September 1941 | 11 August 1989 |
| Forsythia (WAGL-63) | 15 February 1943 | 12 August 1977 |
