= USCGC Sycamore =

USCGC Sycamore is the name of two United States Coast Guard buoy tenders:

- USCGC Sycamore (WAGL-268), commissioned in 1941, decommissioned in 1977
- USCGC Sycamore (WLB-209), commissioned in 2002
