= USCGC Spar (WLB-403) =

Iris class sea going buoy tender

History

United States
- Builder: Marine Ironworks and Shipbuilding Corporation, Duluth, Minnesota
- Cost: $865,941
- Laid down: 13 September 1943
- Launched: 2 November 1943
- Commissioned: 12 June 1944
- Decommissioned: 28 February 1997
- Fate: Scuttled

General characteristics
- Class & type: Iris
- Displacement: 1,025 long tons (1,041 t)
- Length: 180 ft (55 m)
- Beam: 37 ft (11 m)
- Propulsion: 2 × General Motors EMD 645 V8 diesel engines
- Speed: 1945: 13 knots (24 km/h; 15 mph)
- Range: 1945: 8,000 nmi (15,000 km; 9,200 mi) at 13 knots (24 km/h; 15 mph)
- Complement: 45 enlisted and 8 officers
- Armament: 1943: 4 × 20 mm guns; 1 × 3 in (76 mm)/50 cal. deck gun; 2 × depth charge racks; 2 × mousetraps; Peacetime: Small arms

USCGC Spar (WLB-403) was a 180-foot (55 m) sea going buoy tender. An Iris class vessel, she was built by Marine Ironworks and Shipbuilding Corporation in Duluth, Minnesota. Spar's preliminary design was completed by the United States Lighthouse Service and the final design was produced by Marine Iron and Shipbuilding. On 13 September 1943 the keel was laid, she was launched on 2 November 1943 and commissioned on 12 June 1944. The original cost for the hull and machinery was $865,941.

Spar was one of 39 original 180-foot (55 m) seagoing buoy tenders built between 1942 and 1944. All of the seagoing buoy tenders were built in Duluth except USCGC Ironwood.

Spar's most notable accomplishment was a mission to be the first vessels to circumnavigate North America along with sister ship USCGC Bramble and the larger USCGC Storis from 18 May to 24 September 1957. Spar was the first vessel to circumnavigate the North American continent within one year. In 1966, nine years after the northwest passage mission, Spar was assigned a mission conducting oceanographic survey that included port calls at Iceland, Norway, Denmark, Germany, and Ireland.

Spar was decommissioned in 1997 and sold at auction. After changing hands several times, she ended up being transferred to the Northeastern Maritime Historical Foundation, who evaluated her and determined their best use of the ship was to sell her, or parts of her, to raise money to support their other projects. Spar's main engines, generators, and other equipment were removed and sold to re-power another vessel. The hull was prepared and sunk in June 2004 in 100 feet of water, 30 miles (48 km) off Morehead City, North Carolina, where she now serves as an artificial reef.
