= USCGC Forsythia =

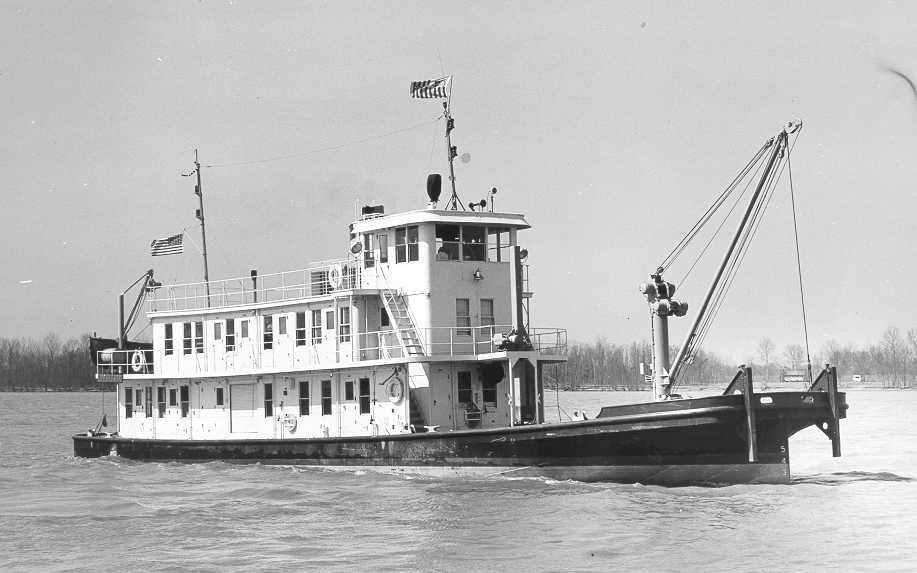
- USCGC Forsythia

History

United States
- Name: USCGC Forsythia
- Namesake: Forsythia
- Builder: Avondale Marine Ways, Westwego, Louisiana
- Commissioned: 15 February 1943
- Decommissioned: 12 August 1977

General characteristics
- Class & type: Sycamore-class buoy tender
- Displacement: 230 tons
- Length: 114 ft (35 m)
- Beam: 26 ft (7.9 m)
- Draft: 5 ft (1.5 m)
- Propulsion: 2 × Superior diesel engines; 720 bhp (537 kW); 2 shafts
- Speed: 10 kn (19 km/h; 12 mph)
- Complement: 24
- Armament: Small arms

USCGC Forsythia (WAGL-63/WLR-63), was a 114-foot, 230-ton buoy tender of the United States Coast Guard. It was one of three such vessels (her sisters were the Dogwood (WAGL-259) and Sycamore (WAGL-268)) built to replace the stern paddlewheel steamers that the Coast Guard decided were too expensive to maintain. She was built by Avondale Marine Ways of Westwego, Louisiana, and entered service in 1943. She was stationed at Sewickley, Pennsylvania until 1963, and then Memphis, Tennessee, until she was decommissioned in 1977.
