= Snohomish =

Snohomish can refer to:

- Snohomish people, a tribe of the Lushootseed people native to Puget Sound in Washington State
- Snohomish dialect, the dialect of Lushootseed spoken by the tribe
- Snohomish, Washington, a city located in the county of the same name
- Snohomish County, Washington
- Snohomish River in Washington
- Snohomish High School in Washington
- MV Napa, formerly known as MV Snohomish, a ferry in the San Francisco Bay Area
- USCGC Snohomish (CG-16), (1908–1934) originally a United States Revenue Cutter
- USCGC Snohomish (WYTM-98), a former US Coast Guard icebreaking tug
