= USCGC Acushnet (WMEC-167) =

United States Coast Guard cutter

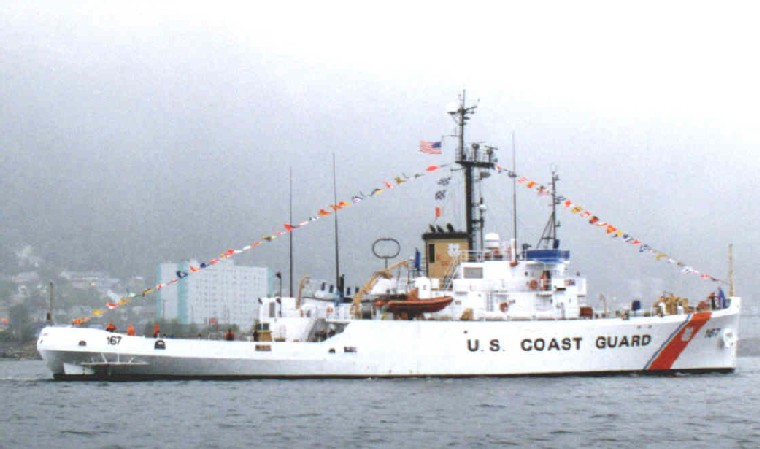
- USCGC Acushnet (WMEC-167)

History

United States
- Name: USS Shackle
- Operator: US Navy
- Builder: Basalt Rock Company
- Laid down: 26 October 1942
- Launched: 1 April 1943
- Sponsored by: Mrs. Walker Cochran
- Christened: 1 April 1943
- Commissioned: 5 February 1944
- Decommissioned: 29 June 1946
- Identification: ARS-9
- Fate: Transferred to the Coast Guard

United States
- Name: USCGC Acushnet
- Namesake: Revenue Cutter Acushnet
- Operator: United States Coast Guard
- Commissioned: 23 August 1946
- Decommissioned: 11 March 2011
- Reclassified: (WAGO-167)- 1968. (WMEC-167)- 1978
- Home port: Ketchikan, AK
- Identification: WMEC-167; MMSI number: 367256000; Callsign: NNHA
- Motto: Help, Save, Strengthen!
- Nickname(s): "A" team of Alaska Fisheries
- Fate: Purchased by individual
- Status: Awaiting restoration
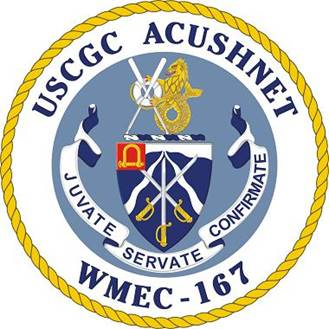
- Badge: Crest of USCGC Acushnet

General characteristics
- Displacement: 1,720 long tons (1,750 t)
- Length: 213 ft 6 in (65.07 m)
- Beam: 39 ft (12 m)
- Draught: 14 ft 4 in (4.37 m)
- Propulsion: Diesel-electric, four Fairbanks-Morse 6-cylinder opposed piston engines driving four generators and motors, driving two shafts with 3,460 shp (2.58 MW)
- Speed: 15 knots (28 km/h; 17 mph)
- Boats & landing craft carried: 2
- Crew: 75
- Armament: two 40 mm AA gun mounts; four .50 cal. machine guns

USCGC Acushnet (WMEC-167) was a cutter of the United States Coast Guard, homeported in Ketchikan, Alaska. She was originally USS Shackle (ARS-9), a Diver-class rescue and salvage ship commissioned by the United States Navy for service in World War II. She was responsible for coming to the aid of stricken vessels and received three battle stars during World War II, before a long career with the Coast Guard. Acushnet patrolled the waters of the North Pacific and was one of the last World War II era ships on active duty in the US fleet upon her retirement in 2011.

== United States Navy service - 1944 to 1946 ==
USS Shackle was laid down on 26 October 1942 by the Basalt Rock Company in Napa, California. Launched on 1 April 1943, she was sponsored by Mrs. Walker Cochran. She was commissioned on 5 February 1944, with Lieutenant Charles G. Jenkins Jr. in command. At the time of her building, the country was at war and in need of more naval vessels. As a result of the necessity, three ships, identified only as "naval auxiliaries" underwent construction. The project took less than a year to complete three fleet rescue and salvage vessels which served in the Pacific Theater. All three vessels later became Coast Guard cutters.

Shackle's first station was at Pearl Harbor, Hawaii, where she served as a salvage ship in the West Pacific throughout the remainder of World War II. Shackle's first year was spent completing extensive salvage assignments clearing wreckage in the channels at Pearl Harbor and Midway Island. The vessel spent the rest of the year in Guam, Eniwetok, Tinian and Saipan.

On February 15, 1945, Shackle sailed for the invasion of Iwo Jima where she successfully completed over 44 diving and salvage assignments. One of these was the battle repair of USS Terry which was hit by a Japanese shore battery. During March 1945, Shackle served as a supporting unit for the Okinawa invasion. Between D-Day (April 1, 1945) and September 20, 1945, the ship completed 55 salvage and rescue operations on larger naval craft damaged by kamikaze attacks. There were 108 general alarms during the period.

Shackle was assigned to mine sweeping operations in the East China Sea where over 200 enemy mines of all types were sunk or destroyed. Shackle cleared the vital docking area of the wreckage of a sunken Japanese cable laying ship at Yokosuka Naval Base, Tokyo Bay, Japan. During all of these operations the Shackle suffered no damage or casualties. As part of her service in the Pacific Theater, Shackle received three World War II battle stars, the WWII Victory Medal, the Asiatic-Pacific Campaign Medal, the American Campaign Medal, and the Navy Occupation Service Medal.

On August 23, 1946 USS Shackle was commissioned into the United States Coast Guard as USCGC Acushnet (WAT-167), a search and rescue vessel and was homeported in Portland, Maine.

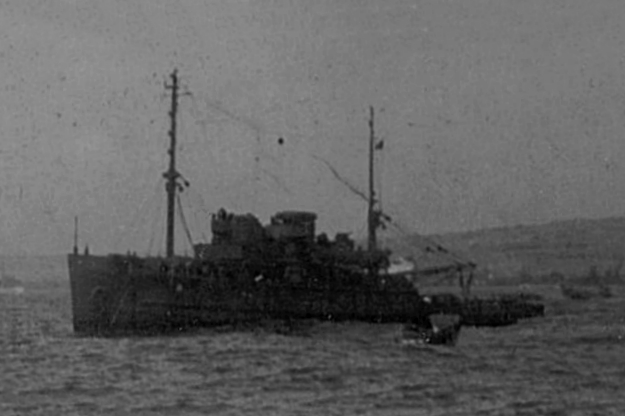
Close-up of USS Shackle at Okinawa during World War II

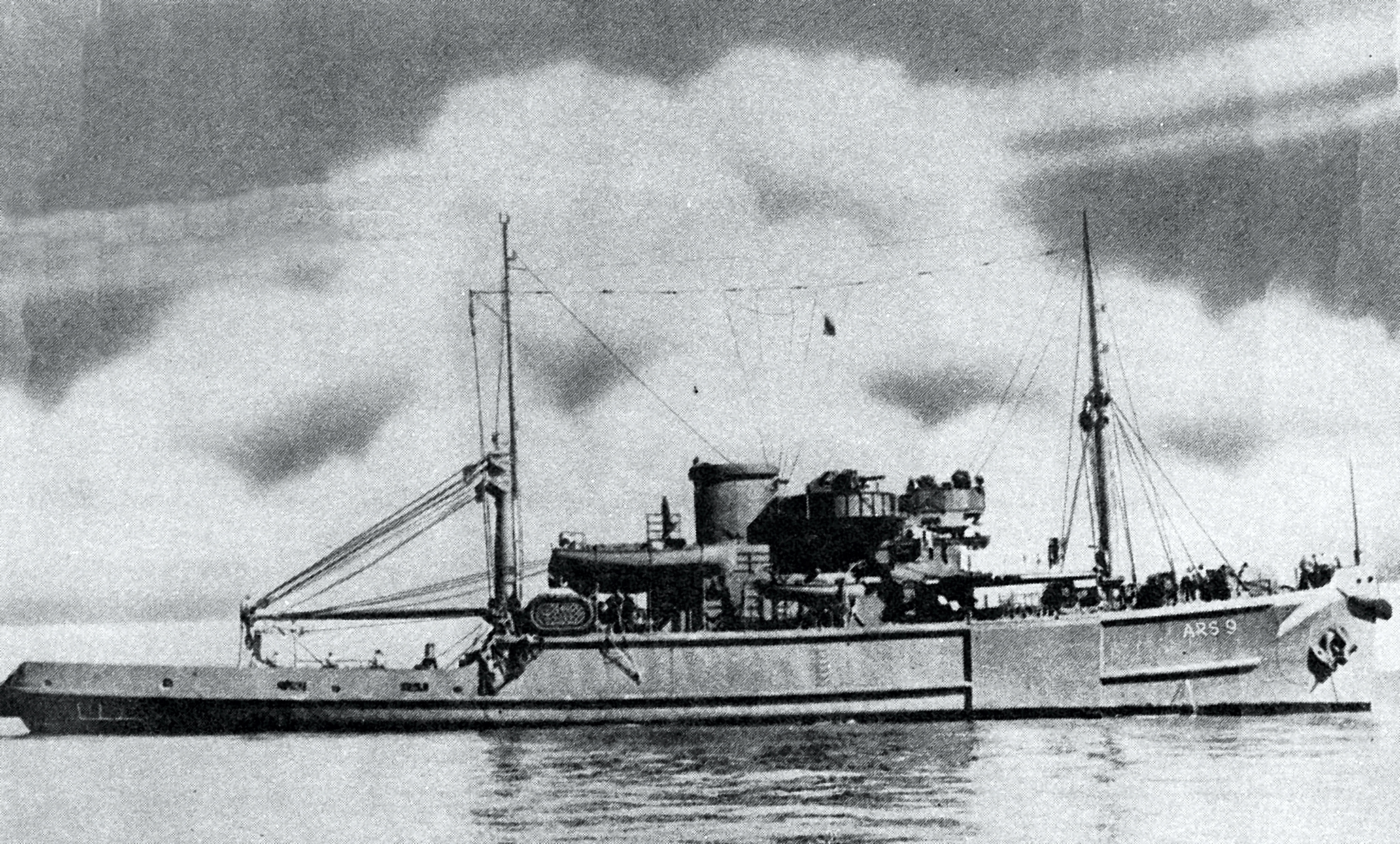
USS Shackle circa 1944.

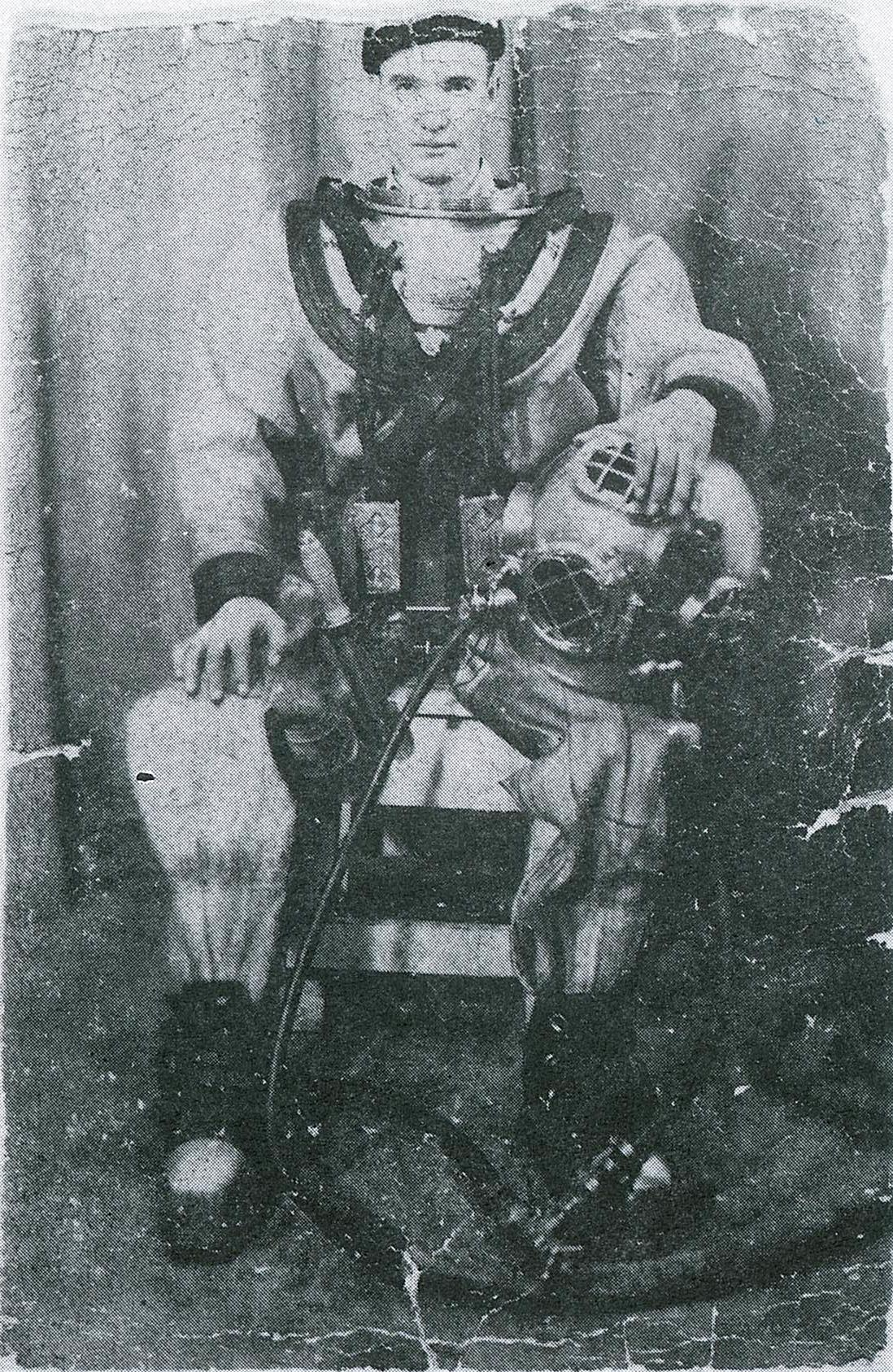
Ship Fitter (First Class) Jack B. Kirch, salvage diver, USN. USS Shackle (ARS-9) 1944.

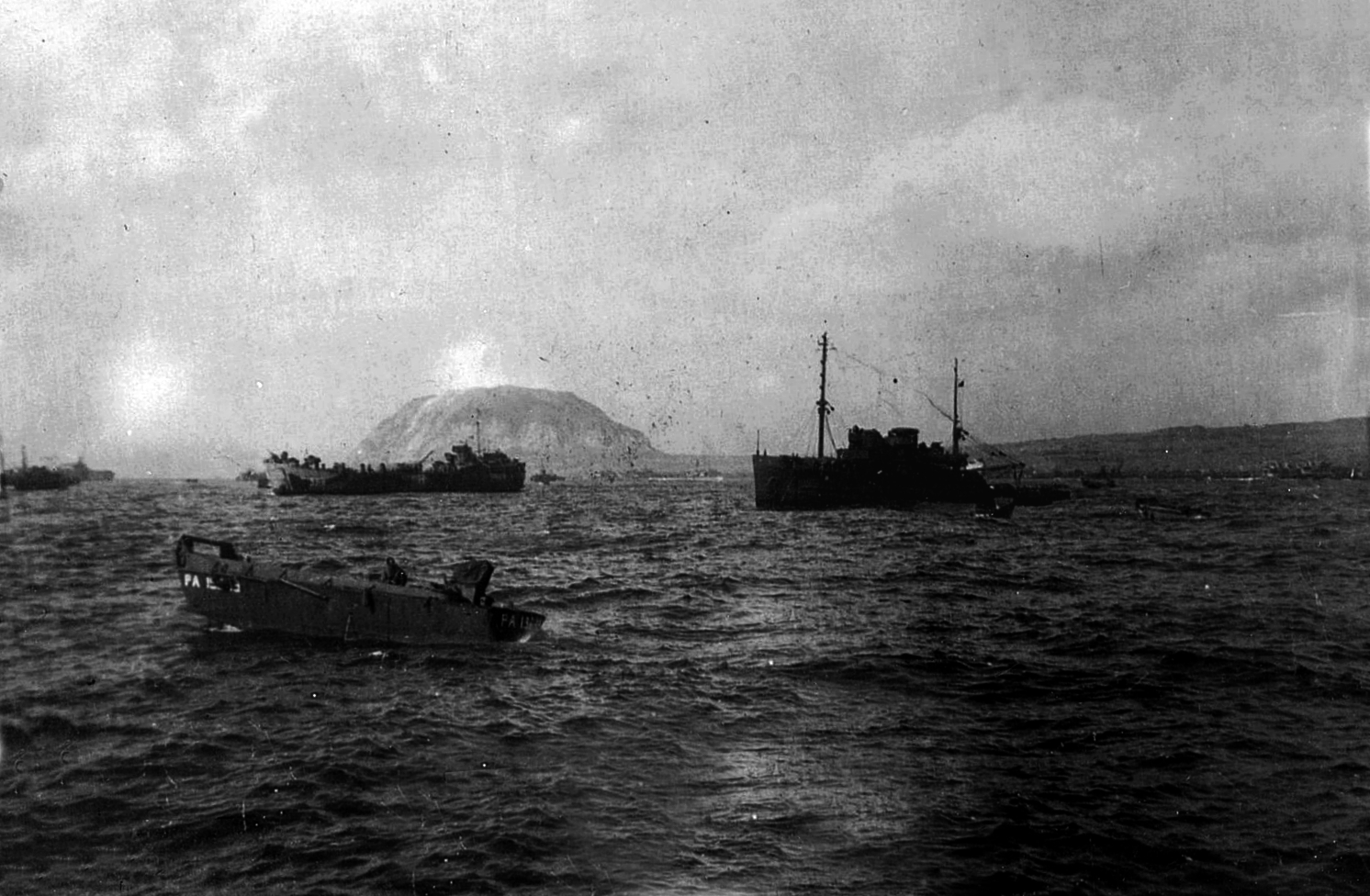
USS Shackle conducting salvage operations at Okinawa.

== Transfer to the United States Coast Guard - 1946 ==
Decommissioned by the United States Navy at the end of World War II, along with her sister ships USS Seize and USS Escape, she was quickly transferred to the United States Coast Guard. She remained at San Diego, California, until ordered to San Francisco, California, where, on 29 June, she was decommissioned and transferred to the Coast Guard. First homeported in Portland, Maine, as a Coast Guard tug, and renamed USCGC Acushnet (WAT-167), she earned a sound reputation as a dependable friend to fishermen and boaters in distress.

== North East and International Ice Patrol Service - 1946 to 1968 ==
While in Portland, Maine Acushnet became a friend to the maritime community with her search-and-rescue endeavors. While in Maine, Acushnet served as a search and rescue vessel, and as part of the International Ice Patrol. Acushnet and her role in the International Ice Patrol was featured in the April 22nd 1957 edition of Life magazine. In September 1947, Acushnet fought a fire in Bar Harbor, Maine. On 4 October 1950, the cutter worked with USCGC Cowslip and USCGC Snohomish to free MV Berwindvale which had run aground in the Kennebec River.

On 18 February 1952, Acushnet participated in what is listed as one of the ten most significant Coast Guard rescues. The tanker SS Fort Mercer split in two in a fierce storm off Cape Cod, and Acushnet took 18 men off the stern of Fort Mercer in heavy seas. The ships collided twice and the merchant seamen jumped to the safety of Acushnet's fantail.

In the year 1950, Acushnet became active in the International Ice Patrol and spent a total of seven patrol months sharing that responsibility with the cutters Androscoggin and Evergreen. Acushnet's salvage gear was removed in late 1959 and replaced with search-and-rescue gear. From 1960 to 1968 Acushnet completed four towing missions for over 950 miles (1,530 km), assisted a vessel that broke in two, escorted four disabled vessels and assisted in two medevacs.

A few of Acushnet's more noteworthy cases during that time frame include the following: in 1960, she salvaged the 300-ton USCGC General Greene which had been driven one hundred yards ashore in high winds. One of her more dramatic cases in Portland included the rescue of the entire crew of ten people from the disabled seagoing dredge Cartagena, which was adrift in 30-foot (9.1 m) seas and 75-knot (139 km/h; 86 mph) winds, 200 nautical miles (370 km; 230 mi) off of Cape Cod on Christmas Day, 1961. In May 1963, Acushnet salvaged a crashed Coast Guard helicopter 600 yards (550 m) off Duxbury Beach, Massachusetts.

The fall of 1967 took Acushnet south, where the cutter rescued a Cuban refugee from a distressed 17-foot (5.2 m) pleasure craft 50 nautical miles (93 km; 58 mi) south of Key West, Florida.

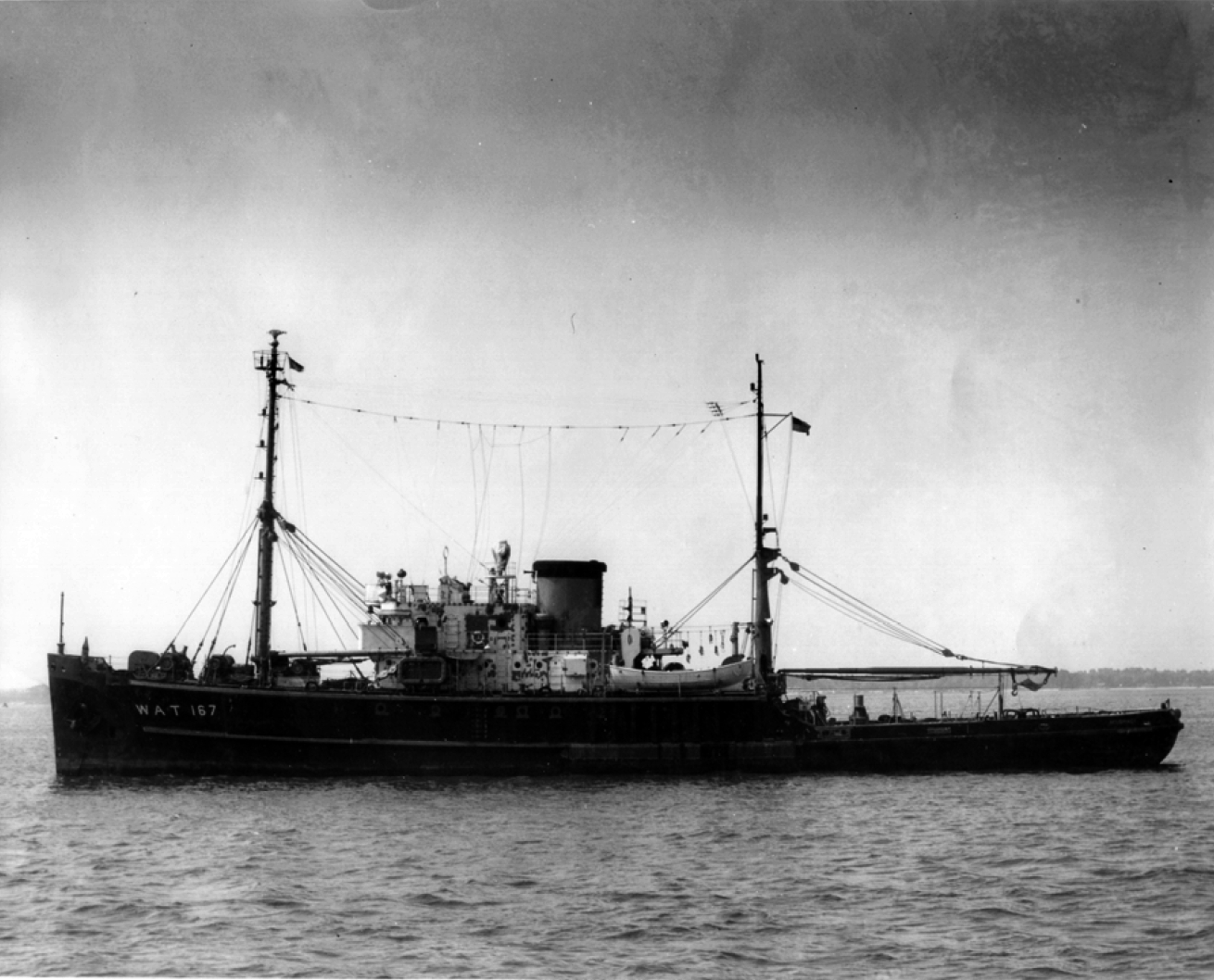
USCGC Acushnet circa the 1950s

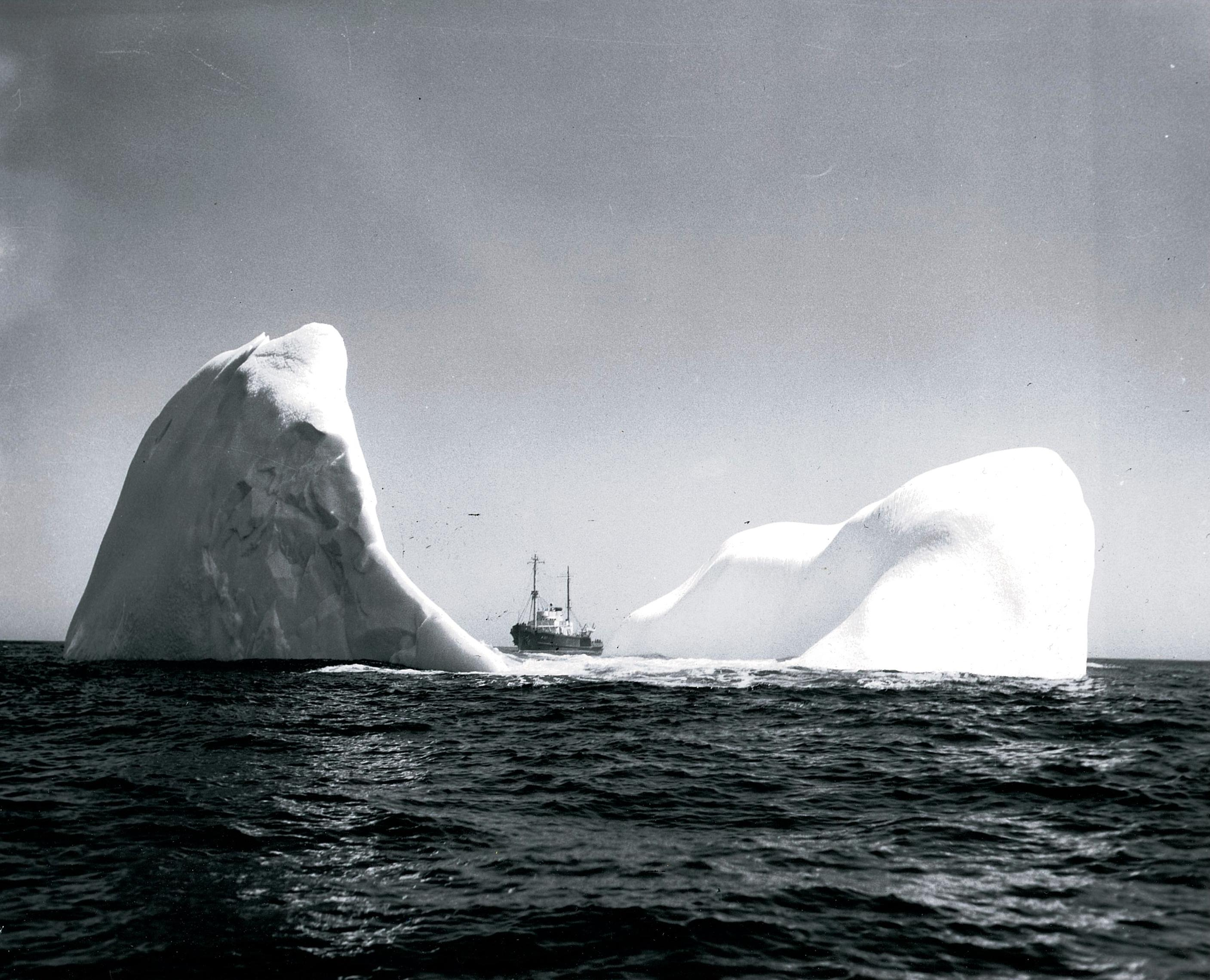
USCGC Acushnet while conducting an International Ice Patrol

== Redesignated as an oceanographic ship - 1968 to 1971 ==
Redesignated an oceanographic ship, WAGO-167, on July 8, 1968, and assigned to oceanographic, meteorological, and polar operations, she commenced duties as a research support ship. During fiscal year 1970, she underwent conversion during which alterations were made to her hull and scientific equipment, and research and storage spaces were added at a shipyard in San Diego, California.

As part of the National Data Buoy Project of NOAA Acushnet spent three years attached to the Office of Naval Research and the Scripps Oceanographic Institute in San Diego, California. Her primary mission on eleven extended deployments to June 1971, the cutter aided in positioning buoys. While serving as a WAGO, Acushnet assisted in one rescue, a medevac in 1970.

== Caribbean service – 1971 to 1990 ==
In July 1971, Acushnet transferred to the Gulf Coast; and, based at Gulfport, Mississippi, she continued her oceanographic work with the National Data Buoy Center, this time aiding the Mississippi Test Facility. On August 24, 1971 Acushnet, affectionately known to the crew as "NOAA's Ark", arrived in Gulfport with 64 crew and a 100-ton buoy that was towed from San Diego as her first new support assignment.

Once established in Gulfport, Acushnet continued to play a diverse and important role in the search-and-rescue mission. In the fall of 1973 the cutter played a major role in the Key Largo fire south of New Orleans opposite the town of Phoenix. Acushnet was again called to respond after a collision on the Mississippi River. Acushnet and the cutter Dependable were presented the Coast Guard Unit Commendation for extinguishing a fire on the tanker Key Trader after she collided with another vessel, the Norwegian ore ship Baune, and burst into flames in the river.

Between the years 1975 and 1978, Acushnet conducted search-and-rescue research of the Gulf of Mexico shelf area, conducted the first marriage on board a Coast Guard vessel since the mid-19th century, and made her first drug seizure of 18 tons of marijuana and 21 smugglers.

In late 1978, the cutter embarked on a patrol to participate in the Global Weather Experiment, 140-nation effort to gather worldwide weather information. In 82 days, Acushnet covered over 18,000 miles (29,000 km) from Peru to New Zealand. For this operation Acushnet received the Meritorious Unit Commendation. Additionally in 1978, Acushnet was designated a Medium Endurance Cutter (WMEC 167) and was formally assigned law enforcement and search-and-rescue missions.

In August–September 1979, Mobile, Alabama, was hit by Hurricane Frederic while Acushnet was there in drydock, although no damage occurred to the cutter. Her first patrol out of drydock was immediately canceled and Acushnet was sent to pick up survivors of a collision between an oil tanker and a merchant vessel.

From May 17 to June 6, 1980, Acushnet participated in the largest immigration crisis in the history of the Coast Guard, the Mariel Boat Lift from Cuba. The cutter escorted the vessel Red Diamond with 800 refugees into Key West. In addition, she assisted 35 boats, aided 120 refugees directly, and fueled two 41-foot Coast Guard boats. For her efforts, the cutter received the Humanitarian Service Award. During her time in Gulfport, Acushnet interdicted nearly 200 Cuban and Haitian refugees, retrieving some of them from shark-infested waters.

Drug interdiction during the rest of the '80s 'proved to be successful. In 1980, Acushnet seized 52 tons of marijuana. Between September and November of the same year, Acushnet confiscated marijuana on 7 vessels totaling a seizure of over 76 tons. Between 1987 and 1989 Acushnet had yet two more seizures of marijuana and hashish oil valued at over 1.5 million: MV Blind Melon and sloop Stormy Weather.

== West Coast service - 1990 to 1998 ==
Acushnet moved to Eureka, California in July 1990. During a September patrol, a lookout spotted floating objects in the water. These "objects" were the three crew members of the fishing boat Miss Patty, which had capsized before she could radio for help. During Operation Sandtrap in July 1991, Acushnet intercepted the sailing vessel Malekula carrying twelve tons of hashish from Indochina. The cutter pulled 32 bales from the burning and sinking Malekula, despite efforts by smugglers to scuttle the sailboat.

In October 1991, Acushnet made her first trip to the waters of Alaska. The cutter was diverted for two weeks to coordinate anti-pollution efforts when the 518-foot Hyundai No. 12 ran hard aground near the Shumagin Islands. She also responded to a mayday call made by the fishing vessel Tonquin in the Gulf of Alaska, rescuing one man out of a five-man crew from stormy and frigid waters during a five-day search. The cutter coordinated a search involving several fishing boats and a tanker in the area. As a result, three additional crew members were rescued.

== Alaska/Bering Sea Patrol service - 1999 to 2011 ==
As the majority of Acushnet's patrols became Alaska Patrols, in 1998 she moved to Ketchikan, Alaska, where she was employed in law enforcement, fisheries, and search and rescue missions in Alaska. This considerably shortened her transit time to the Bering Sea.

On 23 February 2007 Acushnet was designated as the "oldest commissioned cutter" in the fleet following the decommissioning of USCGC Storis. She carries gold hull numbers to show this distinction, and the formal title of "Queen Of The Fleet". She was scheduled for decommissioning in late 2008. In March 2008 letters to the editor appeared in the Boston Herald and Maine Sunday Telegram calling for Boston and Portland to consider the Acushnet as a possible museum ship. The 2008 decommissioning was canceled and Acushnet continued to conduct patrols in Alaska.

In October 2008, Acushnet was involved in search and rescue efforts after the cod fishing vessel Katmai sank in the Aleutians. During the operation, she was featured on the 5th season of the reality TV show Deadliest Catch, although footage shown was of USCGC Alex Haley.

== Decommissioning ==
On 11 March 2011, Acushnet was decommissioned and retired from active duty after more than 67 years of service. USCGC Smilax succeeded Acushnet as the Coast Guard's oldest commissioned cutter. The Coast Guard's 2010 budget scheduled Acushnet's duties to be taken over by a new Fast Response Cutter in 2014. The replacement cutter, USCGC John McCormick, arrived in Ketchikan in 2017.

In March 2011 Acushnet was auctioned as surplus property by the GSA.

In 2022, Acushnet was acquired by Blue Water Overwatch, LLC, to serve as the flagship of their training program. Acushnet is currently undergoing restoration in Anacortes, WA and is scheduled for additional maintenance in drydock in 2023.

== Awards and honors ==
Acushnet has been rewarded for outstanding service on many occasions. Her decorations include:

- Presidential Unit Citation
- Secretary of Transportation Outstanding Unit Award
- 3 Coast Guard Unit Commendations
- 5 Coast Guard Meritorious Unit Commendations
- 12 Coast Guard E Ribbon
- Coast Guard Bicentennial Unit Commendation
- American Campaign Medal
- Asiatic-Pacific Campaign Medal with 3 battle stars
- World War II Victory Medal
- Navy Occupation Service Medal with "Asia" Clasp
- 4 National Defense Service Medals
- Global War on Terrorism Service Medal
- 2 Humanitarian Service Medals
- 2 Special Operations Service Ribbons

Preceded by USCGC Storis (WMEC-38)	United States Coast Guard Queen of the Fleet; 2007-2011	Succeeded by USCGC Smilax (WLIC-315)
