= USCGC Skipjack =

United States Coast Guard patrol boat

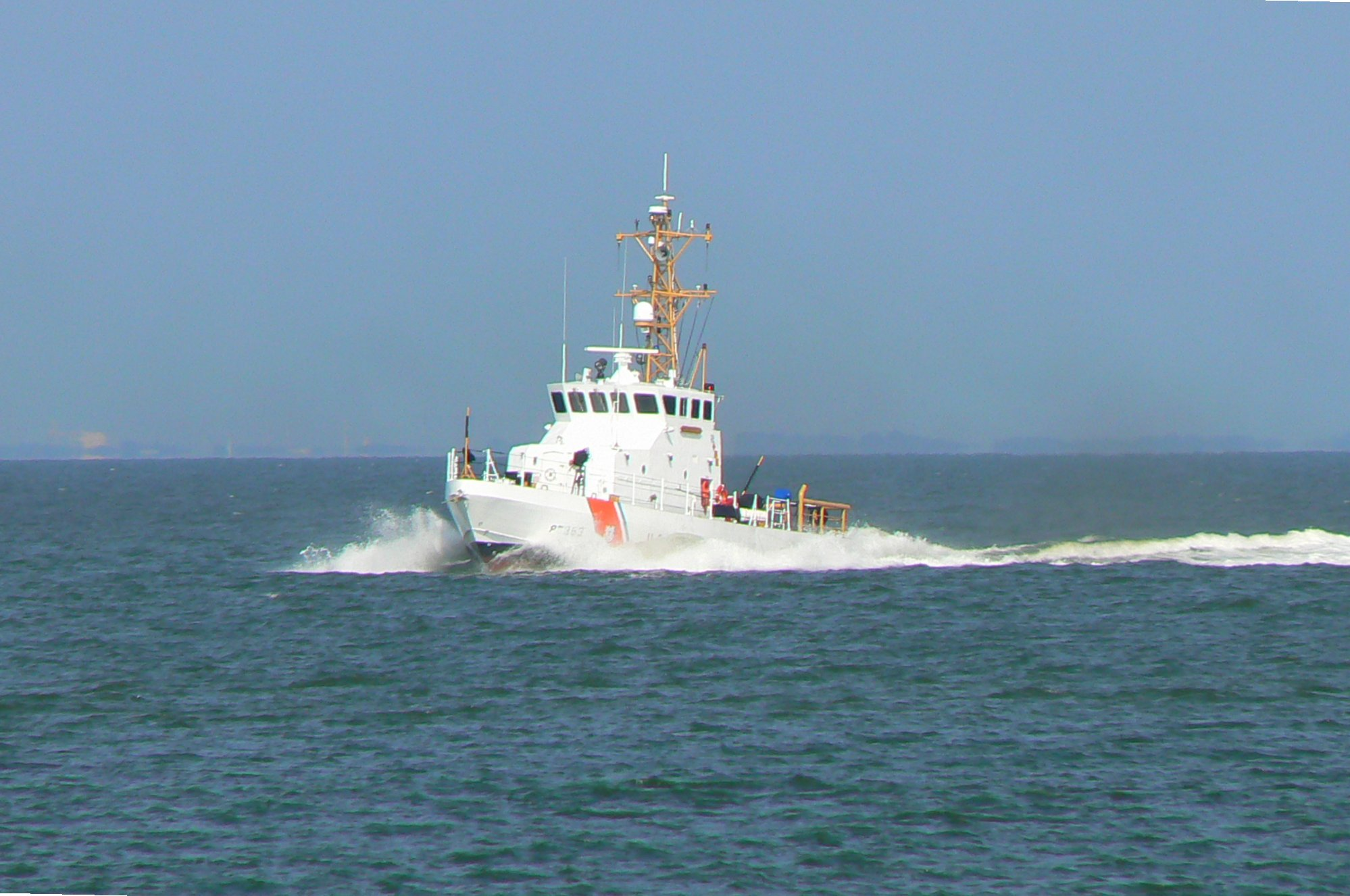
- Skipjack entering Corpus Christi, Texas

History

United States
- Name: Skipjack
- Namesake: Skipjack tuna
- Operator: United States Coast Guard
- Builder: Bollinger Shipyards, Lockport, Louisiana
- Launched: October 7, 2003
- Commissioned: December 16, 2003
- Home port: Galveston, Texas (2012–2015); Cape Canaveral, Florida (by 2023)
- Identification: Hull number: WPB-87353
- Status: In active service
- Badge

General characteristics
- Class & type: Marine Protector-class patrol boat
- Length: 87 ft (27 m)

USCGC Skipjack (WPB-87353) is an 87-foot (27 m) Marine Protector-class of the United States Coast Guard. Commissioned in December 2003, it was based in Galveston, Texas for many years where it carried out law enforcement along the Texas coast. By 2023 it had moved to Cape Canaveral, Florida. In April 2026 its crew enforced security and safety zones offshore during the launch of NASA's Artemis II mission.

== Design ==
Skipjack is one of the Marine Protector-class coastal patrol boats built for the Coast Guard by Bollinger Shipyards of Lockport, Louisiana, under a contract first awarded on March 13, 1996. The class replaced the older 82-foot Point-class cutters. Skipjack was launched on October 7, 2003, and entered service in a special commissioning on December 16, 2003. It is named for the skipjack tuna.

== Service history ==
In 2012 Skipjack was berthed at Coast Guard Sector Galveston, where its work focused on law enforcement along the Texas coastline. On April 15, 2015, it took part with the patrol boats Manowar and Stingray in a "Patrol Boat Round Up" at the Sector Field Office in Galveston, a set of training exercises for 87-foot patrol boats from Mobile, Pensacola and Galveston aimed at showcasing their capabilities and improving crew readiness.

By March 2023 Skipjack was at Coast Guard Station Cape Canaveral, where it hosted a tour by a high school Navy JROTC unit along with the cutter Confidence. In June 2024 the Coast Guard sought a contractor to clean and inspect the cutter's fuel tanks at Cape Canaveral.

On April 1, 2026, Skipjack's crew enforced limited access areas offshore of Port Canaveral during the launch of Artemis II from Kennedy Space Center. The areas included a security zone, a regulated navigation area and a safety zone, set up to protect the public at sea and the launch infrastructure.

== See also ==
- Marine Protector-class patrol boat
- List of United States Coast Guard cutters
