= List of U.S. locomotive types =

== Steam classes ==
Type or class	Whyte classification	Manufacturer
Four-coupled switcher	0-4-0	
Olomana	0-4-2	
Forney	0-4-4	
Six-coupled switcher	0-6-0	
Eight-coupled switcher	0-8-0	
Porter	2-4-0	
Columbia	2-4-2	
Mogul	2-6-0	
Prairie	2-6-2	
Adriatic	2-6-4	
Consolidation	2-8-0	
Mikado	2-8-2	
Berkshire	2-8-4	
Decapod	2-10-0	
Santa Fe	2-10-2	
Texas	2-10-4	
Mallet	2-6-6-2	
Norfolk & Western	2-6-6-4	
Allegheny	2-6-6-6	Lima
Y3 USRA	2-8-8-2	
Yellowstone	2-8-8-4	
?	2-10-10-2	
American	4-4-0	
Atlantic	4-4-2	
Duplex	4-4-4-4	
Q1/Q2	4-4-6-4	Altoona
Ten-Wheeler	4-6-0	
Pacific	4-6-2	
Hudson	4-6-4	
Mastodon	4-8-0	
Mountain	4-8-2	
Northern	4-8-4	
Southern Pacific	4-10-2	
Union Pacific	4-12-2	ALCO
U. P. Challenger	4-6-6-4	
Union Pacific Big Boy	4-8-8-4	ALCO
Pennsylvania	6-4-4-6	Altoona

== Diesel types ==
Type or class	AAR wheel arrangement	Manufacturer	Country
E7	A1A-A1A	EMD	USA
E8	A1A-A1A	EMD	USA
E9	A1A-A1A	EMD	USA
F3	B-B	EMD	USA
F7	B-B	EMD	USA
GP60	B-B	EMD	USA
PA-1	A1A-A1A	ALCO	USA
RS-1	B-B	ALCO	USA
RS-2	B-B	ALCO	USA
RS-2C	C-C	ALCO	USA
RS-12	B-B	Baldwin-Lima-Hamilton	USA
4-S	B-B	Ingalls Shipbuilding	USA
SD40-2	C-C	EMD	USA
SD45	C-C	EMD	USA
SD60	C-C	EMD	USA
SD70	C-C	EMD	USA
SD70M	C-C	EMD	USA
SD70I	C-C	EMD	USA
SD70MAC	C-C	EMD	USA
SD70ACe	C-C	EMD	USA
SD70M-2	C-C	EMD	USA
SD80MAC	C-C	EMD	USA
SD90MAC	C-C	EMD	USA
