= USCGC Cobia =

United States Coast Guard patrol boat

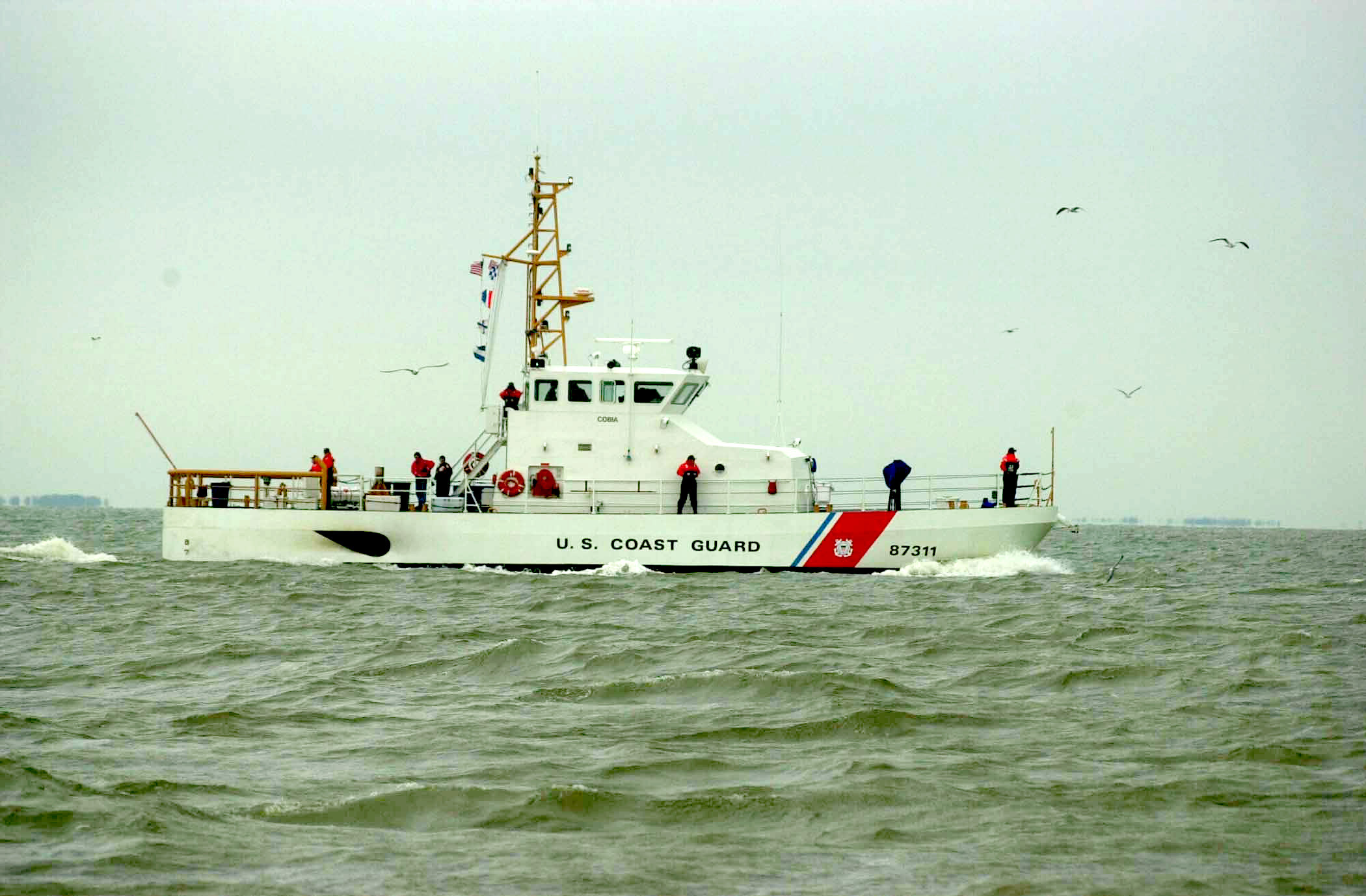
- Cobia provides security as the heavy-lift ship Blue Marlin brings the damaged USS Cole into Pascagoula, Mississippi, December 2000

History

United States
- Name: Cobia
- Namesake: Cobia
- Operator: United States Coast Guard
- Builder: Bollinger Shipyards, Lockport, Louisiana
- Home port: Mobile, Alabama
- Identification: Hull number: WPB-87311
- Status: In active service

General characteristics
- Class & type: Marine Protector-class patrol boat
- Length: 87 ft (27 m)

USCGC Cobia (WPB-87311) is an 87-foot (27 m) Marine Protector-class patrol boat of the United States Coast Guard, based in Mobile, Alabama. It serves Coast Guard Sector Mobile, which covers about 400 miles (640 km) of the Gulf Coast between the Pearl River in Mississippi and the Econfina River in Florida. In December 2000 it provided port security when the destroyer USS Cole was brought back to the United States after the bombing in Yemen. In April 2010 it was one of the first two Coast Guard cutters searching for survivors of the Deepwater Horizon explosion.

== Design ==
Cobia is one of the Marine Protector-class coastal patrol boats built for the Coast Guard by Bollinger Shipyards of Lockport, Louisiana, under a contract first awarded on March 13, 1996. The class replaced the older 82-foot Point-class cutters.

== Service history ==
=== USS Cole ===
In October 2000 the destroyer USS Cole was badly damaged by a suicide bombing in Aden, Yemen. The heavy-lift ship Blue Marlin carried it back to the United States for repairs at Ingalls Shipbuilding in Pascagoula, Mississippi. On December 13, 2000, Cobia provided port security as Blue Marlin brought Cole into Pascagoula.

=== Deepwater Horizon ===
At about 10 p.m. on April 20, 2010, the Coast Guard's Eighth District command center received a report of an explosion and fire aboard the drilling rig Deepwater Horizon, about 42 miles (68 km) southeast of Venice, Louisiana. Eleven crew members were missing. Cobia and the 179-foot (55 m) patrol boat Zephyr were the two cutters that stayed on scene overnight, carrying out active search and rescue operations. Two more cutters were expected that morning to relieve them.

=== Sector Mobile ===
In 2016 Cobia was one of four cutters based in Mobile, along with the tenders Saginaw and Barbara Mabrity and the patrol boat Stingray.

== See also ==
- List of United States Coast Guard cutters
