= Forsythia (disambiguation) =

Forsythia may refer to:

- Forsythia, a plant genus belonging to the Oleaceae (Olive family)
- Forsythia (mammal), a fossil genus of flying squirrels in the family Sciuridae
- "Forsythia", a song by Veruca Salt from their 1994 album American Thighs
- USCGC Forsythia (WAGL-63), a US Coast Guard river tender
