= USCGC Sycamore (WAGL-268) =

History

United States
- Name: USCGC Sycamore
- Namesake: American sycamore
- Builder: Dubuque Boat & Boiler Works, Dubuque, Iowa
- Commissioned: 9 September 1941
- Decommissioned: 30 June 1977

General characteristics
- Class & type: Sycamore-class buoy tender
- Displacement: 280 tons
- Length: 113 ft 9 in (34.67 m)
- Beam: 26 ft (7.9 m)
- Draft: 5 ft 6 in (1.68 m)
- Propulsion: 2 × General Motors diesel engines; 800 bhp (597 kW); 2 shafts
- Speed: 11 knots (20 km/h; 13 mph)
- Complement: 20
- Armament: Small arms

USCGC Sycamore (WAGL-268), a 114-foot, 230-ton river buoy tender, was one of three such vessels (her sisters were the USCGC Dogwood (WAGL-259) and USCGC Forsythia (WAGL-63)) built to replace the stern paddlewheel steamers that the Coast Guard decided were too expensive to maintain.
