= Giuseppina Masotti Biggiogero =

Italian mathematician (1894–1977)

- Born: Giuseppina Biggiogero; 8 August 1894; Melegnano, Italy
- Died: 24 October 1977 (aged 83); Milan, Italy
- Other names: Giuseppina Biggiogero Masotti
- Occupations: academic, mathematician, historian
- Years active: 1921–1969

Giuseppina Masotti Biggiogero (8 August 1894 – 24 October 1977) was an Italian mathematician and historian. Known for her work in algebraic geometry, she also wrote noted histories of mathematicians, like Maria Gaetana Agnesi and Luca Pacioli. She was a member of the Lombard Institute Academy of Science and Letters and won both the Bordoni Prize and Torelli Prize for her work.

== Early life ==
Giuseppina Biggiogero was born on 8 August 1894 in Melegnano, Italy to Marta (née Massironi) and Biagio Biggiogero. She completed her primary and secondary studies in Lodi, earning a degree as a teacher in 1912. While continuing her studies at the Carlo Cattaneo Technical Institute, she began teaching elementary school, first in Carpiano and later in Melegnano. At the time that she was studying, the only paths available to enter university were to obtain a high school diploma, which was not typically available to women, or to obtain a degree from a technical institute. In 1916, Biggiogero earned her certificate with a specialty in physics and mathematics.

Receiving a scholarship to attend the Politecnico di Milano in 1917, she quit her teaching post. She initially began her studies in engineering, but in 1918 moved to the mathematics courses. Because the Politecnico did not offer a specific curriculum for math, she transferred in 1919 to the University of Pavia, where she studied under the instruction of Luigi Brusotti. She graduated in 1921, obtaining her diploma for teaching in pure mathematics. Working as an assistant to the professors Luigi Berzolari and Francesco Gerbaldi, Biggiogero published two works on real algebraic curves, which were recognized with the Bordoni and Torelli prizes. Her 1922 book, was titled Sulle curve piane, algebriche, reali che presentano massimi d'inclusione and she published Gruppi di massimi d'inclusione per curve piane, algebriche, reali, d'ordine n in 1923.

== Career ==
In 1924, eager to work with Oscar Chisini, Biggiogero returned to Milan and was appointed as his assistant and the professor for the descriptive and projective geometry courses at the Politecnico di Milano. From 1927, she also gave lectures at the Mathematical and Physical Seminary of Milan, which was founded in that year, and taught higher and projective geometry courses at the University of Milan. She was assigned as the editor of the mathematical entries in the Enciclopedia Italiana (Italian Encyclopedia, 1933) and reviewed the first sixteen volumes of the work, focusing on the compilations of Federigo Enriques. In 1939, Biggiogero married Arnaldo Masotti, a fellow academic, who at the time was the professor of Rational Mechanics in the Faculty of Architecture. She was made chair of Geometry at the Politecnico in 1948 and retained that post until her retirement in 1969. In addition to lecturing on descriptive geometry in the mathematics department, she taught projective geometry to the students in the architectural and engineering departments.

Biggiogero's research produced a large body of work on algebraic geometry, including research on the shapes and bundles of algebraic curves, tensorial calculations, Hessian singularities of curves and the construction of the triple and quadruple planes. She and Chisini co-published several works together, including two textbooks Lezioni di geometria descrittiva (Lessons of Descriptive Geometry) published in 1941 and Esercizi di geometria descrittiva (Exercises of Descriptive Geometry), produced in 1946. As a secondary path, she researched algebraic differentials, studying transversals, including Liouville's and Reiss' theorems, as well as the invariant theory of Enrico Bompiani. She was also one of the first scholars in Italy to study integral geometry. She published works which summarized the results of Morgan Crofton, Henri Lebesgue, and Luis Santaló, presenting new formulas for determining ovals and ellipses.

Also concerned with the history of mathematics, Biggiogero published studies on the geometry of the triangle and the tetrahedron, in conjunction with Virginio Retali for the Encyclopedia of Elementary Mathematics. She wrote a biography of Luca Pacioli and with her husband produced a study on Maria Gaetana Agnesi and her works. In 1949, she was made a member of the Lombard Institute Academy of Science and Letters and was also a member of Mathesis, the Italian Society of Mathematical and Physical Sciences. In 1974, Clifford Truesdell, editor-in-chief of the Archive for History of Exact Sciences, dedicated volume 14 to Biggiogero and her husband in recognition of their scholarship.

== Death and legacy ==
Biggiogero died after a lengthy illness in Milan on 24 October 1977. Posthumously, a street in her home town of Melegnano was named in her honor.

== Selected works ==
- Biggiogero, Giuseppina (1922). Sulle curve piane, algebriche, reali che presentano massimi d'inclusione (in Italian). Milan, Italy: Ulrico Hoepli. OCLC 881761945.
- Biggiogero, Giuseppina (1923). Gruppi di massimi d'inclusione per curve piane, algebriche, reali, d'ordine n (in Italian). Milan, Italy: Ulrico Hoepli. OCLC 881761901.
- Chisini, Oscar; Masotti Biggiogero, Giuseppina (1941). Lezioni di geometria descrittiva (in Italian). Milan, Italy: Libreria Editrice Politecnica. OCLC 878289562.
- Chisini, Oscar; Masotti Biggiogero, Giuseppina (1946). Esercizi e complementi di geometria descrittiva (in Italian). Milan, Italy: Tamburini. OCLC 859812525.
- Massotti Biggiogero, Giuseppina (1956). The Life and Works of Luca Pacioli. Vol. 31. Milan, Italy: Fontes Bibliotheca Ambrosianae.
- Massotti Biggiogero, Giuseppina (December 1962). "Nuove formule di Geometria integrale relative agli ovali". Annali di Matematica Pura ed Applicata. 58 (1): 85–108. doi:10.1007/BF02413047. S2CID 186224924.
