= USCGC Smilax =

Construction tender vessel

USCGC Smilax (WLIC-315)
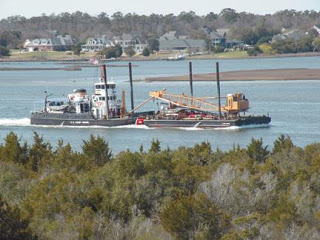
- USCGC Smilax (WLIC-315) underway

History

United States
- Name: Smilax
- Operator: United States Coast Guard
- Builder: Dubuque Boat & Boiler Works
- Cost: $194,238
- Laid down: 26 November 1943
- Launched: 18 August 1944
- Commissioned: 1 November 1944
- Reclassified: WLI (1966); WLIC (1979)
- Home port: Fort Pierce, Florida (1944–1954); New Smyrna Beach, Florida (1954–1965); Brunswick, Georgia (1965–1999); Atlantic Beach, North Carolina (1999–)
- Identification: MMSI number: 366999640; Callsign: NRYN
- Motto: Natu Maximus Mandatum Traba; (Oldest Commissioned Ship)
- Nickname(s): Queen of the Fleet
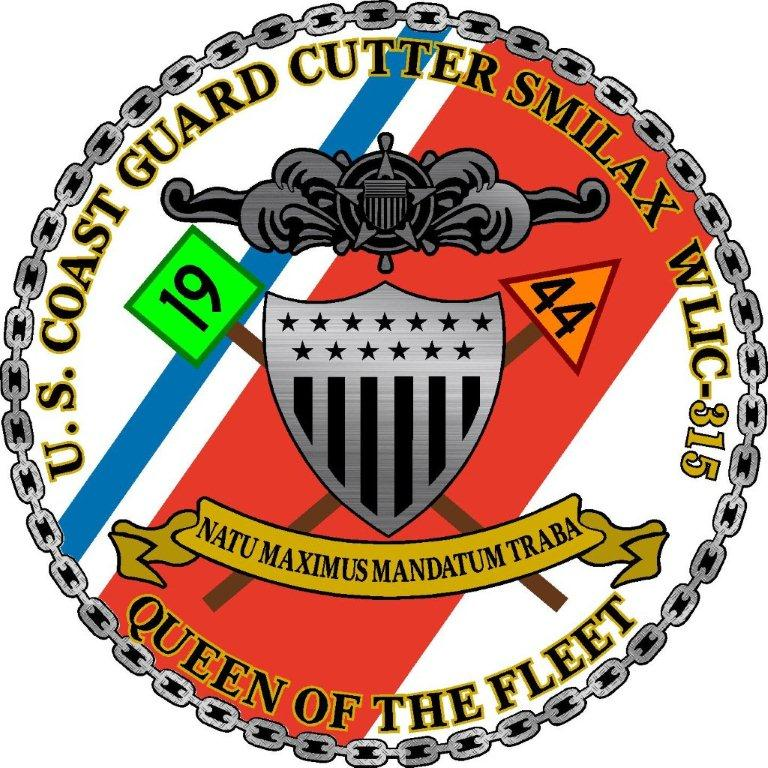
- Badge

General characteristics
- Class & type: Cosmos-class inland construction tender
- Displacement: 175 long tons (178 t)
- Length: 100 ft (30 m)
- Beam: 24.6 ft (7.5 m)
- Draft: 5.3 ft (1.6 m)
- Installed power: 2 × Waukesha diesel engines 600 bhp (450 kW)
- Speed: 10.5 knots (19.4 km/h; 12.1 mph)

USCGC Smilax (WAGL/WLIC-315) is a 100-foot (30 m) United States Coast Guard Cosmos-class inland construction tender. Commissioned in 1944, Smilax is the "Queen of the Fleet", the oldest commissioned U.S. Coast Guard cutter.

== History ==
Smilax was built by Dubuque Boat & Boiler Works in Dubuque, Iowa. Her keel was laid on 26 November 1943, she was launched on 18 August 1944, and commissioned 1 November 1944. Built as a 100-foot bay and sound tender at a cost of $194,238, she required a year to build at a time when most ships were built in 40 days, making her the most expensive ship of her class.

After commissioning, Smilax was assigned to the Seventh District and was stationed at Fort Pierce, Florida where she engaged in the aids to navigation mission. From 1 June 1954 to 9 November 1965, she was homeported out of New Smyrna Beach, Florida. While stationed in Florida she assisted on several search and rescue cases.

After twenty years of service, Smilax was refitted with new engines, and given a 70-foot (21 m) barge. On 9 November 1965, she moved to Brunswick, Georgia as her new homeport, carrying out the aids to navigation mission for that area. She was redesignated WLI-315 in 1966, and WLIC-315 on 1 October 1979.

In July 1999, Smilax moved to her current homeport of Atlantic Beach, North Carolina, relieving her sister ship USCGC Primrose (WLIC-316) of her aids to navigation duties.

== Mission ==
Smilax's mission, since her commissioning, has been to service aids to navigation, ensuring the safe navigation of mariners. From her current homeport she is responsible for maintaining 1,226 fixed aids to navigation such as lights and range markers. She is also responsible for 26 buoys throughout the Outer Banks of North Carolina.

== Queen of the Fleet ==
On 11 March 2011, upon the decommissioning of USCGC Acushnet (WMEC-167), Smilax became Queen of the Fleet. Queen of the Fleet is the oldest commissioned cutter in Coast Guard service. This distinction is denoted by gold hull numbers on the bow of the ship.

== Awards ==
- Presidential Unit Citation
- Secretary of Transportation Outstanding Unit Award
- Coast Guard Unit Commendation
- Coast Guard Meritorious Unit Commendation
- Coast Guard Bicentennial Unit Commendation
- American Campaign Medal
- World War II Victory Medal
- National Defense Service Medal (4th award)
- Humanitarian Service Medal
- Global War on Terrorism Service Medal
- Sea Service Deployment Ribbon

Preceded by USCGC Acushnet (WMEC-167)	United States Coast Guard; Queen of the Fleet; 2011-present	Succeeded by Incumbent
