= Riesman =

Riesman is a surname. Notable people with the surname include:

- David Riesman (1909–2002), American sociologist
- David Riesman (physician) (1867–1940), German-born American physician
- Michael Riesman, composer, conductor, keyboardist, and record producer

== See also ==
- Reisman
- Riesman's sign
