= Ingalls 4-S =

Diesel-electric locomotive

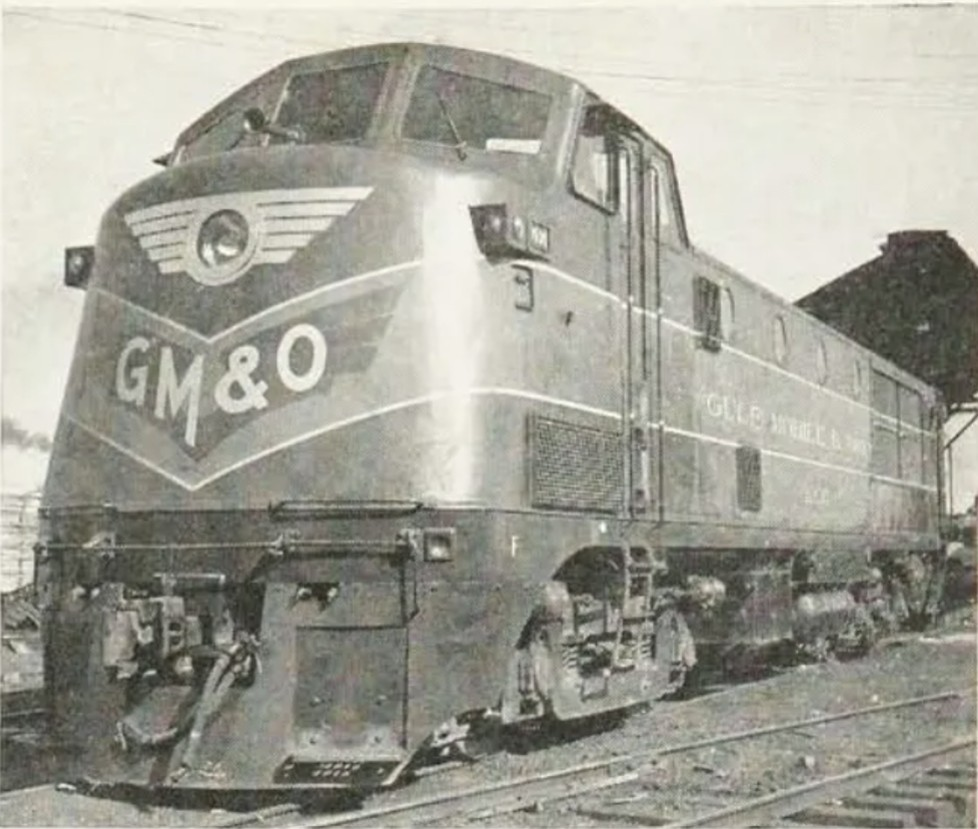
Type and origin
- Power type: Diesel-electric
- Builder: Ingalls Shipbuilding
- Serial number: 1501
- Build date: March 1946
- Total produced: 1
Specifications
- Configuration
  - AAR: B-B
- Gauge: 4 ft 8 1/2 in (1,435 mm)
- Length
  - Over body: 56 ft 6 in
- Width: 10 ft 0 in
- Height: 15 ft 0 in
- Loco weight: 272,000 lb (123.4 tonnes)
- Fuel capacity: 1,000 US gal (3,800 L; 830 imp gal)
- Lubricant cap.: 150 US gal (570 L; 120 imp gal)
- Coolant cap.: 280 US gal (1,100 L; 230 imp gal)
- Sandbox cap.: 28 cubic ft
- Prime mover: Superior Engines & Compressors 65LX8
- RPM
  - Maximum RPM: 660
- Aspiration: Turbocharged
- Generator: GE GT581
- Traction motors: GE 752 (4)
- Cylinders: I8
- Cylinder size: 12.5 in × 15 in (320 mm × 380 mm)
- Gear ratio: 15:63
Performance figures
- Maximum speed: 65 mph (105 km/h)
- Power output: 1,650 hp (1,230 kW)
- Tractive effort
  - Starting: 72,000 lbf (320.27 kN)
  - Continuous: 42,800 lbf (190.38 kN)
Career
- Operators: Gulf, Mobile & Ohio
- Numbers: 1900
- Retired: 1966
- Disposition: Scrapped in 1967

The Ingalls 4-S was an experimental American locomotive built by Ingalls Shipbuilding immediately after World War II. Intended as the first of many Ingalls-built locomotives, it was the only one the company built. It served on the Gulf, Mobile and Ohio Railroad (GM&O) until it was retired in 1966; it was scrapped the following year.

== Design and development ==
At the end of World War II, Ingalls Shipbuilding, based in Pascagoula, Mississippi, developed plans for a line of diesel-electric locomotives to serve the expected post-war market. Five models were projected; the first, and as it proved only, to be built was a prototype of the largest, the model 4-S.

A single demonstrator was planned in December 1945, and built in March 1946, numbered #1500. The design of the locomotive was considered advanced, including a "turret cab" arrangement, which improved the crew's vision. The prime mover selected for the locomotive was the inline-8 65LX8, based on a marine diesel engine built by Superior Engines & Compressors; and modified for railroad use by Cooper-Bessemer, and Elliott Company providing the turbocharger. The 4-S produced 1,650 hp (1,230 kW), of which 1,510 hp (1,130 kW) was available for the production of tractive effort by the locomotive's electric drive, but marketed as 1,500 horsepower. Provision was made for the installation of a steam generator for passenger service. The locomotive was equipped with connections for multiple unit operation.

== Operational service ==
The 4-S demonstrator was tested by a number of railroads, including the Louisville and Nashville, Seaboard Air Line, Mississippi Export Railroad, Gulf, Mobile and Ohio, and the Southern Railway; however no orders materialized for the type, or for any other of Ingalls' proposed locomotives. The lack of orders combined with issues with the supply of components resulted in Ingalls electing to abandon its plans for locomotive construction; the sole 4-S was the only locomotive they ever built. It was sold to the Gulf, Mobile and Ohio Railroad for US$140,000 in June 1946, where it received the road number 1900.

The 4-S served with the GM&O, operating primarily from Mobile, Alabama, to Jackson, Mississippi, but also served around Meridian and Laurel. It was used in switching duty, earning a reputation for toughness; it once derailed, landing inverted, but was repaired and returned to service in short order. In 1966, the railroad traded it in to EMD as partial payment for new SD40s. It was offered to the Illinois Railway Museum for US$3,000, but the museum was unable to raise the funds. When no other buyers materialized, it was sold to Pielet Brothers in 1967, where it was scrapped.
