= Sprague (towboat) =

American towboat

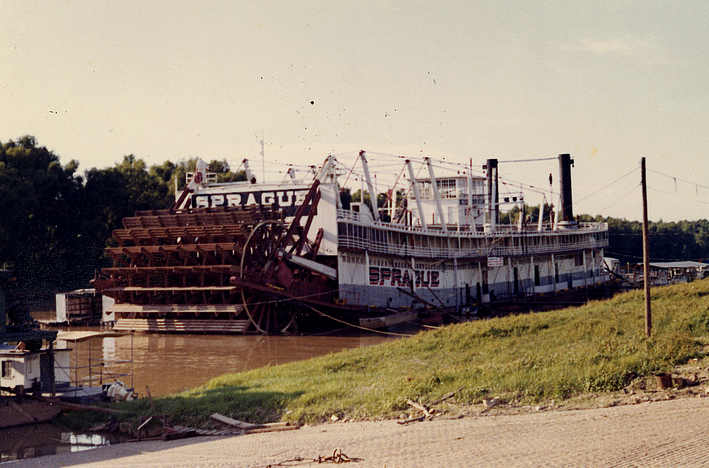
- Sprague, Vicksburg.

History

United States
- Name: Sprague
- Builder: Peter Sprague
- In service: 1902
- Out of service: 1948
- Nickname(s): Big Mama
- Fate: Destroyed by fire, 15 April 1974

General characteristics
- Type: Towboat
- Length: 276 ft (84 m)
- Beam: 61 ft (19 m)
- Draft: 7.4 ft (2.3 m)
- Installed power: 2,079 hp (1,550 kW)
- Propulsion: coal-fired steam

Sprague, built at Dubuque, Iowa's Iowa Iron Works in 1901 by Captain Peter Sprague for the Monongahela River Consolidated Coal and Coke Company, was the world's largest steam powered sternwheeler towboat. She was nicknamed Big Mama, and was capable of pushing 56 coal barges at once. In 1907, Sprague set a world's all-time record for towing: 60 barges of coal, weighing 67,307 tons, covering an area of 6 1/2 acres, and measuring 925 feet (282 m) by 312 feet (95 m). She was decommissioned as a towboat in 1948.

== Legacy ==
After decommissioning, the Sprague became a museum on the Vicksburg, Mississippi, waterfront, and restoration was initiated in 1972 using funds appropriated by the Mississippi Legislature. For many years the long-running melodrama Gold in the Hills was performed on the towboat.

Restoration had begun, but on April 15, 1974, the upper decks of the towboat burned while moored at Vicksburg. In 1975, the Sprague was moved to dry dock north of Vicksburg while negotiations for restoration funding proceeded.

On April 15, 1977, the Sprague was listed on the National Register of Historic Places (NRHP). With restoration funding approved, the Sprague was moved from dry dock in March 1979 to a mooring site on the Yazoo River Diversion Canal north of Vicksburg. However, before restoration contracts were awarded, the Sprague sank at the mooring site, and restoration efforts were abandoned. The smokestacks and paddlewheel were removed, and in 1981, the Army Corps of Engineers demolished what was left of the Sprague using dynamite before clearing the metal debris from the canal. The Sprague was delisted from the NRHP on May 15, 1987.

As of 2019, pieces of the Sprague were still evident in Vicksburg, Mississippi.

A model of Sprague is in the National Mississippi River Museum & Aquarium in Dubuque, Iowa. The model was made in 1908 by Elizabeth Marine Ways, a steamboat yard in Elizabeth, Pennsylvania, and was put on show at the Pittsburgh Exposition of 1908. Another model of Sprague can be found in the Portland Museum in the Portland neighborhood of Louisville, KY.

The Friends of the Sprague organization sponsored a mural entitled The Big Mama of the Mississippi as one of the Vicksburg Riverfront Murals. It was dedicated on March 23, 2007.
