= Reisman =

Reisman is a surname of German-Jewish Ashkenazic origin (Hebrew: רייזמן). Notable people with the surname include:

- Barry Reisman, radio host
- Chris Reisman (born 1978), American basketball coach
- Del Reisman (1924–2011), American television producer, story editor and screenwriter
- Garrett Reisman (born 1968), American engineer and NASA astronaut
- George Reisman (born 1937), American professor of economics at Pepperdine University
- Heather Reisman (born 1948), Canadian businesswoman and CEO of Indigo Books
- Judith Reisman (1935–2021), American anti-pornography activist
- Leo Reisman (1897–1961), American violinist
- Linda Reisman, American film producer
- Lonn Reisman (born 1954), American basketball coach and athletic director
- Marty Reisman (1930–2012), American table tennis player
- Nancy Reisman (born 1961), American author and academic
- Ori Reisman (1924–1991), Israeli painter
- Rod Reisman, American drummer; original drummer of the band DEVO
- Sarah E Reisman, American chemist
- Simon Reisman (1919–2008), Canadian civil servant

== See also ==
- Riesman
