= DNA and Cell Biology =

- Discipline: Molecular biology
- Language: English
- Edited by: Carol Reiss

Publication details
- Former name(s): DNA
- History: 1981–present
- Publisher: Mary Ann Liebert (United States)
- Frequency: Monthly
- Impact factor: 2.634 (2017)

Standard abbreviations
- ISO 4: DNA Cell Biol.

Indexing
- ISSN: 1044-5498 (print); 1557-7430 (web)
- OCLC no.: 19827838

Links
- Journal homepage; Online Access

DNA and Cell Biology is a scientific journal published by Mary Ann Liebert, Inc., and covers topics related to DNA and cell biology, such as:

- Gene structure, function and regulation
- Molecular medicine
- Cellular organelles
- Protein biosynthesis and degradation
- Cell-autonomous inflammation and host cell response to infection

Articles produced with NIH funding appear in PubMed Central a year after publication, starting with volume 27 (2008).

== Indexing ==
DNA and Cell Biology is indexed in:

- Biochemistry & Biophysics Citation Index
- Biological Abstracts
- BIOSIS Previews
- Biotechnology Citation Index
- CAB Abstracts
- Current Contents/Life Sciences
- EMBASE/Excerpta Medica
- EMBiology
- Journal Citation Reports/Science Edition
- MEDLINE
- Science Citation Index
- Science Citation Index Expanded
- Scopus
