= USCGC Pamlico (WLIC-800) =

History

United States
- Name: Pamlico
- Namesake: Pamlico Sound

General characteristics
- Class & type: Pamlico-class inland construction tender
- Displacement: 460 long tons (470 t)
- Length: 160 ft (49 m)
- Beam: 34 ft (10 m)
- Draft: 8 ft (2.4 m)
- Propulsion: 2 × diesel engines
- Speed: 11 knots (20 km/h; 13 mph)
- Range: 5,300 nmi (9,800 km; 6,100 mi)
- Complement: 13 to 15

USCGC Pamlico (WLIC-800) is the lead vessel of the Pamlico-class,160-foot inland construction tenders of the United States Coast Guard. Its primary tasks include maintaining aids to navigation (ATON) and search-and-rescue (SAR) in times of need. Since its commissioning in 1976, she has been homeported in New Orleans, Louisiana. The vessel is named after the Pamlico Sound in South Carolina, which takes its name from a local Indigenous Algonquin population. The Pamlico was one of the first government response vessels in downtown New Orleans following Hurricane Katrina in August 2005.

== Construction and Design ==
The vessel was built at the United States Coast Guard Yard in Curtis Bay at Baltimore, Maryland. The vessel's keel was laid in June of 1974 and launched in December of 1975. The vessel displaces 460 long tons (470 t)s and measures 160 feet (49 m) with a beam of 30 feet (9.1 m). Her draft measures roughly 8 feet (2.4 m). The vessel is powered by two Caterpillar D379 diesel engines powering twin shafts, achieving a top speed of 11 knots (20 km/h; 13 mph). with an operational range of roughly 5,300 nautical miles (9,800 km; 6,100 mi). She features a self-contained construction tender with a working deck, tool storage, and an onboard crane to maintain and relocate navigation buoys. The vessel does not contain a fixed armament but does contain one man-portable .50-caliber M2 machine gun and has the capacity for multiple crew-operated M240 GPMG weapons. She is crewed by a complement of 13 to 15 personnel.

== Service ==
The vessel was commissioned on August 11, 1976, with the hull number WLIC-800. Since her commissioning in the 1976, the vessel has primarily operated along the Gulf Coast of the United States and also serves the Gulf Intercoastal Waterway and surrounding coastal rivers and canals providing aid to navigation for passenger and commercial vessels.

Following the landfall of Hurricane Katrina in August 2005, the Pamlico was one of the first search and rescue vessels able to access survivors. She established herself as an operating base at the Algiers Ferry Terminal for other coast guard vessels, ferries, tugs, barges, and local vessels transporting survivors. Survivors would be assessed, triaged, and evacuated by helicopter from the terminal. The vessel assisted in a total of 7,000 evacuation from the Algiers Ferry Terminal. In September, many of the Coast Guard vessels were relieved by the United States Navy. The Pamlico immediately returned to duty maintaining navigation aid, if which roughly 70% in the New Orleans area had been damaged or removed by the hurricane.
