= Uzzi Reiss =

Uzzi Reiss (Hebrew: עוזי רייס; born 1945 in Haifa) is an American private practice gynecologist offering anti-aging medicine services. He runs his California-based practice The Beverly Hills Anti-aging Center for Men and Women & Advanced Nutrition and Hormone-Based Gynecology.

He received his M.D. from Technion – Israel Institute of Technology in 1972, and completed his U.S. medical residency in obstetrics and gynecology at Albert Einstein College of Medicine, where he served as chief resident of the department from 1979-1980. In 1982, Reiss opened a private practice marketed as a premenstrual syndrome (PMS) health center aimed at resolving the condition with hormones. Reiss has authored numerous books about women's health.

In 1997, Reiss opened the Beverly Hills Anti-Aging Center in California. He is board-certified by the American Academy of Anti-Aging Medicine, which is not recognized by established medical organizations such as the American Medical Association.

== Publications ==
- Natural Hormone Balance for Women: Look Younger, Feel Stronger, and Live Life with Exuberance (2002), with Martin Zucker
- How to Make a Pregnant Woman Happy: Solving Pregnancy's Most Common Problems - Quickly and Effectively (2003), with Yfat M. Reiss
- How to Make a New Mother Happy: A Doctor's Guide to Solving Her Most Common Problems - Quickly and Effectively (2004), with Yfat M. Reiss
- The Natural Superwoman: Why Bioidentical Hormones are a Safe and Effective Alternative (2007), with Yfat Reiss Gendell
- Good News About Estrogen: The Truth Behind a Powerhouse Hormone (2020)

== See also ==
- Life extension
