= USRC Snohomish =

Tugboat of the U.S. Revenue Cutter Service

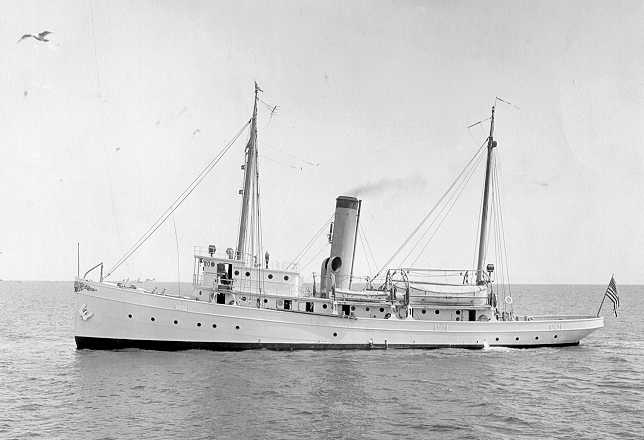
- The Snohomish, built for service on the North Pacific coast

History

United States
- Name: Snohomish
- Namesake: Native American tribe in Washington State
- Owner: United States Coast Guard
- Ordered: 1906
- Builder: Pusey & Jones, Wilmington, Delaware
- Launched: 14 March 1908
- Commissioned: 15 November 1908
- Decommissioned: 1 December 1934
- Fate: Sold 1934, sunk near Saturna Island, British Columbia, 1941

General characteristics
- Type: Seagoing tug
- Displacement: 880 tons
- Length: 152 ft (46 m)
- Beam: 29 m (95 ft)
- Draft: 15 ft 6 in (4.72 m)
- Propulsion: 1 × 1,200 hp (895 kW) triple expansion steam, 18", 29", 47" x 30" stroke w/ 2 boilers
- Speed: 12 knots (22 km/h; 14 mph) max (1930)
- Complement: 7 officers, 46 enlisted
- Armament: 1 3"/50 cal. gun (1930)

The USRC Snohomish was a 152 ft (46 m) seagoing tug built at the specific direction of Congress by Pusey & Jones, Wilmington, Delaware for service on the Pacific Northwest coast. She was fitted with latest lifesaving and property saving equipment available at the time of her construction and originally cost $189,000. She was commissioned by the United States Revenue Cutter Service on 15 November 1908 and arrived at her homeport of Neah Bay, Washington by way of passage around Cape Horn in 1909.

Snohomish was a regular part of the Bering Sea Patrol and enforced international sealing regulations. Her duties included search and rescue, law enforcement, fisheries patrol, mail delivery to light ships and remote stations, patrolling regattas, and towing disabled vessels.

She served her entire career in the Pacific Northwest and was decommissioned and sold 1 December 1934.

== See also ==
The Coast Guard commissioned a second vessel, the USCGC Snohomish (WYTM-98) in 1944.

== Notes ==
Citations

References cited

- "Snohomish (1908)". Cutters, Craft & U.S. Coast Guard-Manned Army & Navy Vessels. U.S. Coast Guard Historian's Office.
- Canney, Donald L. (1995). U.S. Coast Guard and Revenue Cutters, 1790–1935. Naval Institute Press, Annapolis, Maryland. ISBN 978-1-55750-101-1.
