= Barry Reisman =

Barry Reisman was the host of The Barry Reisman Show. In its final format, it was an hour-long, Monday-Friday radio program playing on WWDB, 860 kHz AM, in Philadelphia, featuring klezmer and other Jewish music. Reisman's Jewish music radio program had been running almost continually on various radio stations in the Philadelphia area from 1965 to 2025.

Reisman started his radio career in 1962 at WRNJ-FM in Atlantic City, New Jersey. He switched to WSLT in Ocean City, NJ, and then to WMID in Atlantic City.

In 1965, he began his Jewish music radio program on WTEL in Philadelphia. The program soon moved to WQAL-FM, and in 1969 it moved again, to WIBF-FM. The show stayed at WIBF for 23 years until 1992 when it moved to WSSJ-AM in Camden, NJ. In 1998, the program moved to WNWR-AM in Philadelphia. In 2011 it moved back to its original station, now known as WWDB.

The Broadcast Pioneers of Philadelphia inducted Reisman into their Hall of Fame in 2011.
