= USCGC Dogwood =

History

United States
- Name: USCGC Dogwood
- Namesake: Dogwood
- Builder: Dubuque Boat & Boiler Works, Dubuque, Iowa
- Commissioned: 17 September 1941
- Decommissioned: 11 August 1989

General characteristics
- Class & type: Sycamore-class buoy tender
- Displacement: 280 tons
- Length: 113 ft 9 in (34.67 m)
- Beam: 26 ft (7.9 m)
- Draft: 5 ft 6 in (1.68 m)
- Propulsion: 2 × General Motors diesel engines; 800 bhp (597 kW); 2 shafts
- Speed: 11 knots (20 km/h; 13 mph)
- Complement: 20
- Armament: Small arms

USCGC Dogwood (WAGL-259/WLR-259) was a 114-foot river buoy tender of the United States Coast Guard. Constructed by the Dubuque Boat & Boiler Works Company in Dubuque, Iowa, she was commissioned in 1941 and served until 1989. She was stationed at Vicksburg, Mississippi and later Pine Bluff, Arkansas. She had an active career, from tending ATON to escorting the NASA rocket barge Palaemon on three occasions and assisting in the cleanup operation along the Gulf Coast in the aftermath of Hurricane Betsy.

The ship had three nicknames: Dogfood, Divorce Boat, "The Dog.
