= Carol Shoshkes Reiss =

Viral immunologist

- Occupation: Viral immunologist

Academic background
- Education: Bryn Mawr College; Sarah Lawrence College
- Alma mater: Mount Sinai Graduate School of Biomedical Sciences
- Doctoral advisor: Jerome L. Schulman

Academic work
- Discipline: Biology
- Sub-discipline: Immunology
- Institutions: New York University

Carol Shoshkes Reiss, an American viral immunologist, was a professor at New York University's Department of Biology between 1991 and 2020. She is currently a professor emerita at New York University. Her research focused on the dynamic contest between the mouse immune system and virus replication during central nervous system infection. Reiss was editor-in-chief of the journal Viral Immunology (2000–2006) and is currently editor-in-chief of the journal DNA and Cell Biology (2012–present).

== Biography ==
Reiss attended public schools in South Orange and New Jersey, before joining Bryn Mawr College (A.B. in biology, 1972), Sarah Lawrence College (M.S. in human genetics, 1973). She earned a Ph.D. in microbiology from Mount Sinai Graduate School of Biomedical Sciences, an affiliate of City University of New York. Jerome L. Schulman was her advisor for her dissertation.

She was a postdoctoral research fellow of Steven J. Burakoff in the department of pathology at Harvard Medical School (1978–1981), and then an instructor, assistant professor and associate professor of pathology and pediatric oncology at Dana–Farber Cancer Institute (1981–1991). She joined New York University as a tenured full professor in 1991 and retired at the end of 2020. In addition to the department of biology, she has faculty appointments in neural science in NYU's Faculty of Arts and Science, and in its College of Global Public Health.

=== Scientific work ===
Her research at Mt. Sinai characterized the ability of killed, subunit, and attenuated influenza virus to induce immune responses and protection from infectious challenge by homotypic and heterotypic influenza viruses. As a postdoctoral fellow, she explored the responses of helper T cell responses to influenza and mapped critical domains of class I Major Histocompatibility Complex molecules necessary for presenting viral peptides to cytolytic T cells.

In collaboration with Alice S. Huang, Reiss's lab studied viral encephalitis, the pathogenesis of Vesicular Stomatitis Virus (VSV) infection in the central nervous system, and the recognition of viral proteins. The role and molecular mechanisms by which cytokines altered the course of infection were studied both in vitro and in vivo. These studies determined that the antiviral response of neurons to cytokines (interferons-b and -g, IL-12, and TNF-a) was profoundly different from cells of other origins. The lab also examined the impact of the administration of cytokines, and common drugs that modulated prostaglandins, leukotrienes, and cannabinoids impacted the disease pathogenesis. Other studies developed a vector capable of either being a flexible vaccine platform or effective for killing tumor cells.

== Professional activities ==
Reiss organized the international Keystone Symposia, "Molecular Aspects of Viral Immunology"(1990–2001) with several co-organizers. She also organized Neuroimmunology conferences at the New York Academy of Sciences (2004–2006). She was a co-organizer of the "March for Science" in NYU in 2018.

Reiss was elected a Fellow of the New York Academy of Sciences in 2005.

She was also the co-principal investigator and co-director of the NYU Science Training Enhancement Program (one of the seventeen NIH BEST programs) for 1200 doctoral students and postdoctoral fellows (2013–2018). She coordinates science faculty advisors for students at Tisch School of the Arts who are writing screenplays that compete for support from the Alfred P. Sloan Foundation.

Her memoir, One Unintended Consequence of SPUTNIK: My Career in Science (ISBN 978-1917007443), was published in 2023.

== Selected publications ==
Reiss published more than 88 peer-reviewed papers and two editions of the book Neurotropic Viral Infections. Her memoir [One Unintended Consequence of SPUTNIK: My Career in Science], ISBN 978-1917007443, was published in 2023. Her H-Index is 40.

- Sex differences in autoimmune disease, CC Whitacre, Nature immunology 2 (9), 777–780 1879* 2001
- Ia expression by vascular endothelium is inducible by activated T cells and by human gamma interferon. JS Pober, MA Gimbrone Jr, RS Cotran, CS Reiss, SJ Burakoff, W Fiers, The Journal of experimental medicine 157 (4), 1339–1353, 767, 1983
- Lymphocytes recognize human vascular endothelial and dermal fibroblast Ia antigens induced by recombinant immune interferon, JS Pober, T Collins, MA Gimbrone, RS Cotran, JD Gitlin, W Fiers, Nature 305 (5936), 726–729, 533, 1983
- Long-term human cytolytic T-cell lines allospecific for HLA-DR6 antigen are OKT4+, AM Krensky, CS Reiss, JW Mier, JL Strominger, SJ Burakoff, Proceedings of the National Academy of Sciences 79 (7), 2365–2369, 322, 1982
- Inducible expression of class II major histocompatibility complex antigens and the immunogenicity of vascular endothelium, JS Pober, T Collins, MA Gimbrone Jr, P Libby, CS Reiss, Transplantation 41 (2), 141–146 249, 1986
- Does nitric oxide play a critical role in viral infections?, CS Reiss, T Komatsu, Journal of Virology 72 (6), 4547-4551
