= Manfred Reiss =

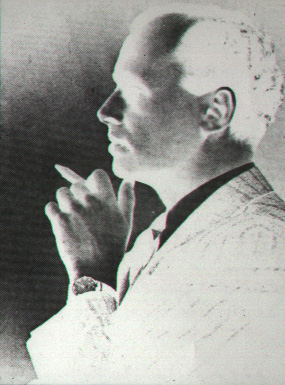

Manfred Reiss (1922–1987) born in Leipzig, Germany, son of Golda and Menahem Reiss, Jews of Polish descent. The family moved to London in 1937.

In London, Manfred pursued a successful career in graphic design. In the late forties and early fifties, he was one of the most prolific British poster designers. Many of his creations were reproduced in the International Poster Annuals, a selection of the best in international poster designs from this period. His major client was the Post Office Savings Bank, where he was assistant to Henri Kay Henrion. Reiss' posters are always cleanly designed and easy to understand, often composed of simple drawings with a photo-montage or simple photographed elements.
