= Michel Reiss =

German mathematician

Michel Reiss (23 July 1805, Frankfurt – 27 January 1869, Frankfurt) was a German mathematician known for his contributions to linear algebra, particularly for introducing what later became known as the Reiss relation in the theory of determinants.

== Life and work ==
Michel Reiss was born and died in Frankfurt, then part of the German Confederation. He was active as a mathematician during the 19th century, a period marked by the formal development of linear algebra and determinant theory. Reiss is primarily associated with research on determinants, which at the time were becoming an essential tool in algebra and analysis.

His most notable work, Beiträge zur Theorie der Determinanten (1867), contributed to the theoretical foundations of determinants and includes results that later authors referred to as the Reiss relation. Although Reiss did not belong to a major mathematical school, his work was cited in subsequent 19th-century literature on algebraic methods.

== Publications ==
- Reiss, M. (1867). Beiträge zur Theorie der Determinanten. Leipzig: Teubner.
