= C.D. Reiss =

American novelist

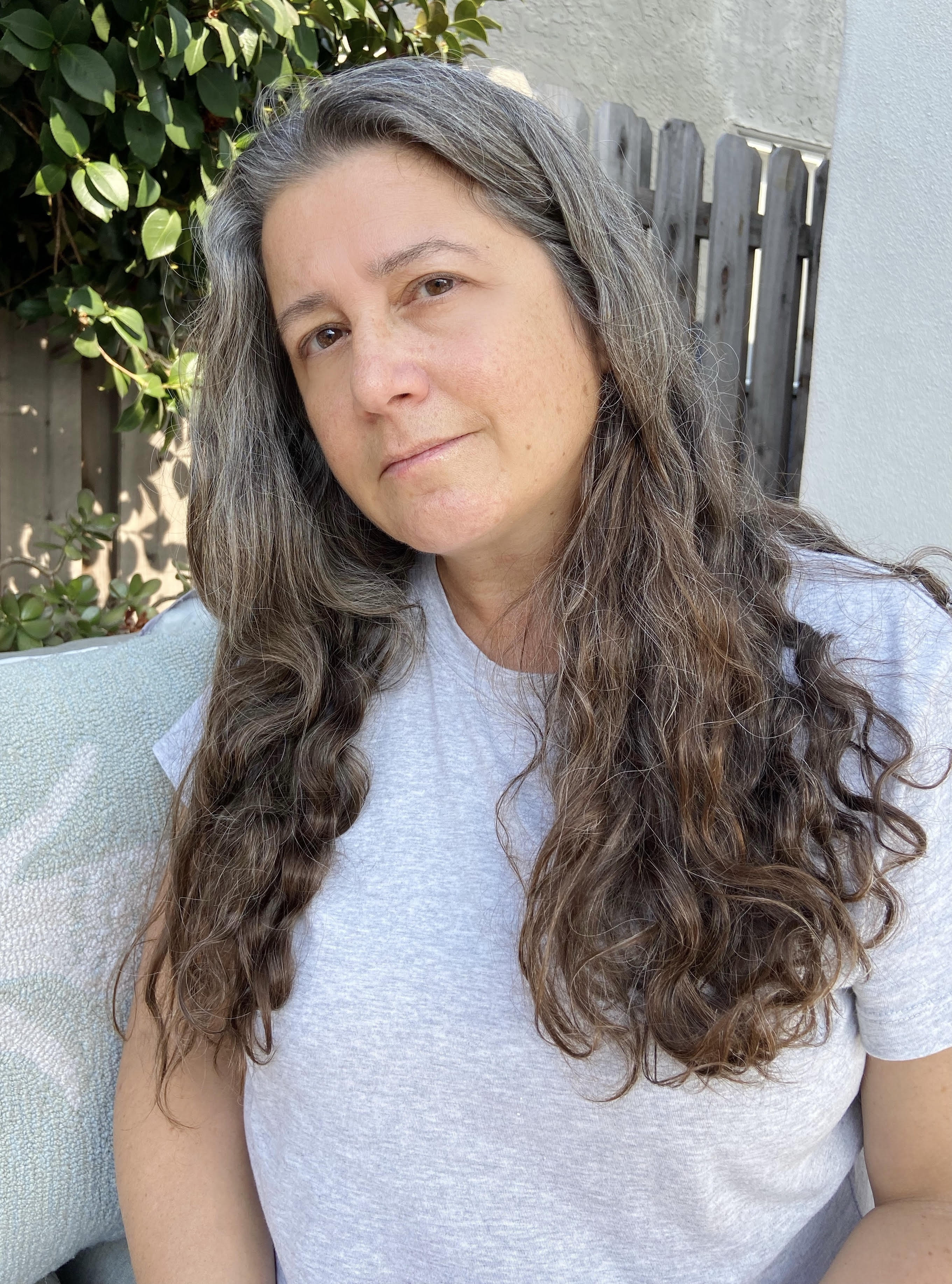
- Born: New York City, U.S.
- Occupation: Novelist
- Website: cdreiss.com

C.D. Reiss is an American novelist best known for contemporary and erotic romance. Reiss is a New York Times and USA Today bestselling novelist. In 2016 Reiss was nominated for two Audie Awards in one category for the audio books, Beg Tease Submit and Control Burn Resist. She is the recipient of the Audie Award for the audio book, Marriage Games published in 2017.

== Bibliography ==
=== Standalone novels ===
- 2015:- Shuttergirl
- 2016:- HardBall
- 2017:- Hollywood A-List
- 2019:- Only Ever You
- 2020:- The Crowne Brothers
- 2020:- Lead Me Back

=== Series ===
- 2013:- The Submission Series
- 2014:- Corruption Series
- 2014:- Forbidden Series
- 2016:- The Games Duet
- 2018:- The Edge Series
- 2021:- DiLustro Arrangement Series

=== Erotica ===
- 2019:- Best Women's Erotica of the Year
