= Iowa Iron Works =

Iowa Iron Works, renamed Dubuque Boat and Boiler Works in 1904, was a manufacturing company established in Dubuque, Iowa in 1883.

== Notable Boats ==
Sprague built in 1901, was the world's largest steam powered sternwheeler towboat.

In 1907, the Sprague set a world's all-time record for towing: 60 barges of coal, weighing 67,307 tons, covering an area of 6 1/2 acres, and measuring 925 feet (282 m) by 312 feet (95 m). A model of Sprague is in the National Mississippi River Museum and Aquarium in Dubuque, Iowa.

United States Coast Guard inland construction tender USCGC Smilax (WLIC-315) built 1943–1944, was designated Queen of the Fleet, the Coast Guard's oldest commissioned cutter, in April 2011.
