= USCG inland construction tender =

Type of ship

An inland construction tender is a type of ship used to build and service shore structures such as piers and buoy trestles. It is also used to maintain buoys and aids to navigation. Less frequently, they may be used for law enforcement, environmental, icebreaking, and search and rescue operations.

The United States Coast Guard currently has three classes of inland construction tenders designated as WLIC.

== 160-foot class inland construction tender ==
- USCGC Pamlico (WLIC-800)
- USCGC Hudson (WLIC-801)
- USCGC Kennebec (WLIC-802)
- USCGC Saginaw (WLIC-803)

== 100-foot class inland construction tender ==
- USCGC Primrose (WLIC-316)
- USCGC Smilax (WLIC-315)
- USCGC Rambler (WLIC-298)
- USCGC Cosmos (WLIC-293)

== 75-foot class inland construction tender ==
- USCGC Anvil (WLIC-75301)
- USCGC Axe (WLIC-75310)
- USCGC Clamp (WLIC-75306)
- USCGC Hammer (WLIC-75302)
- USCGC Hatchet (WLIC-75309)
- USCGC Mallet (WLIC-75304)
- USCGC Sledge (WLIC-75303)
- USCGC Vise (WLIC-75305)
- USCGC Wedge (WLIC-75307)

== See also ==
- USCG coastal buoy tender
- USCG inland buoy tender
- USCG seagoing buoy tender
