= Reiss (brand) =

English fashion brand

- Type: Private
- Industry: Fashion
- Founded: 1971; 55 years ago
- Headquarters: London, England
- Number of locations: 160
- Key people: David Reiss (founder)
- Products: Clothing
- Revenue: £146 million (2016)
- Operating income: £24.4 million (2016)
- Owner: Next plc 72% | Reiss Family 22% | Reiss Management 6%
- Website: www.reiss.com

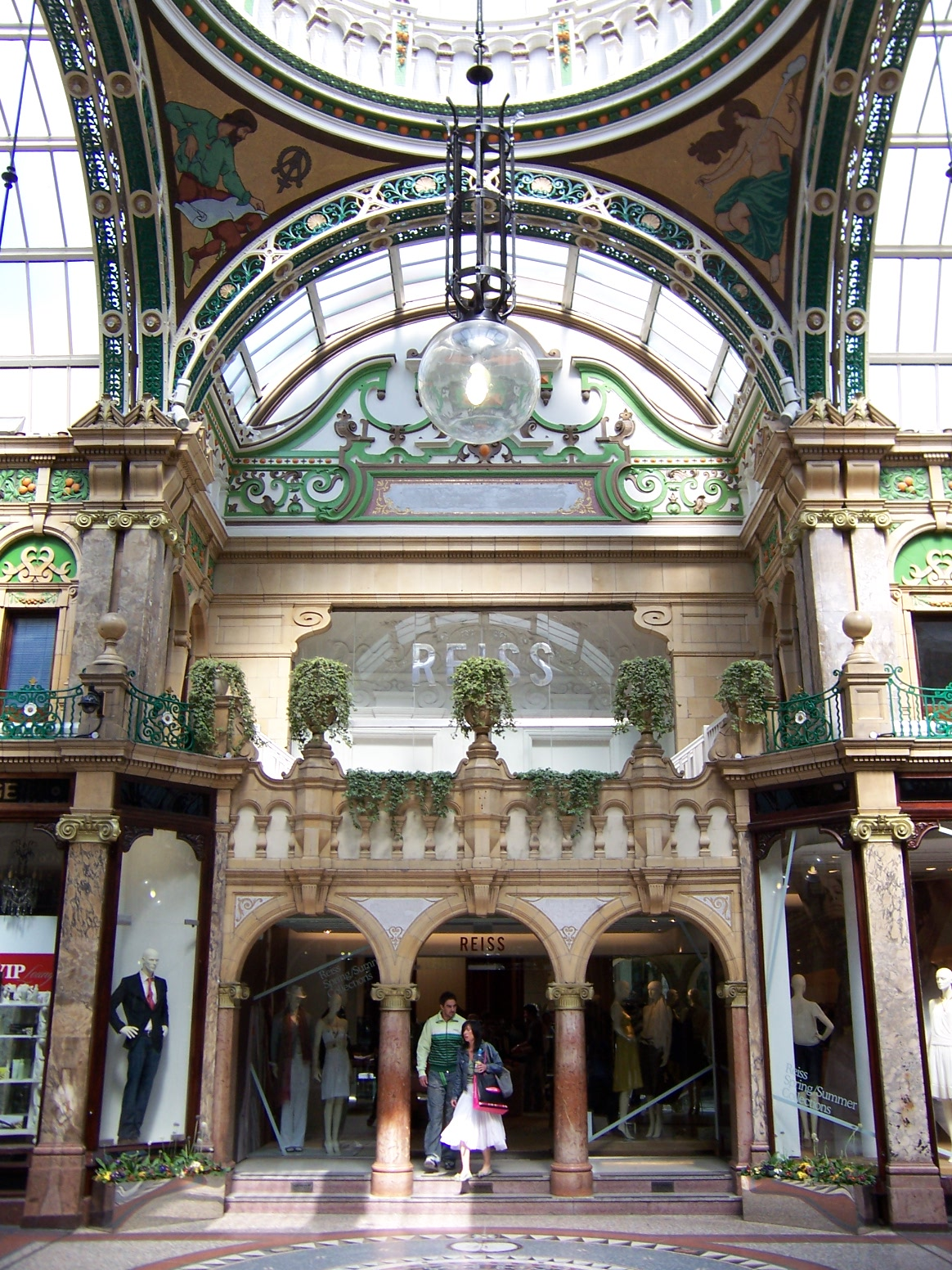
Reiss in Victoria Quarter in Leeds

Reiss (/riːs/ Reess) is an English fashion brand and retail store chain. The brand produces men's and women's clothing. It has 160 stores in 15 countries.

Reiss was founded by David Reiss in 1971. Its first store in London's Bishopsgate sold men's suits. It began to sell women's clothes from 2000.

The Reiss flagship store and headquarters in London, designed by Squire and Partners, has won several awards including the RIBA Award, the BCO Award and the Civic Trust Award. The brand was named Fashion Retailer of the Year in 2003 at the British Style Awards.

Reiss has seen a significant increase in the number of its stores to 160 outlets worldwide, including key stores in Heathrow Terminal 5 and Westfield London as well as over four dozen locations across the United States as of 2022. Reiss intends to eventually grow to 250 stores worldwide.

In April 2016, a 51% majority stake was sold to the American private equity firm Warburg Pincus for £230 million.

In June 2021, British clothing retailer Next agreed to buy a 25 percent stake in Reiss from both Warburg Pincus and the Reiss Family for £33 million, and also make a debt investment of £10 million, financed from cash resources. Following the purchase Next announced their intention to integrate Reiss's e-commerce solutions into the Next Total Platform, allowing for cross channel sales on both next.com and reiss.com.

In June 2022, Next increased their share of ownership in the brand to 51%, taking over majority ownership from Warburg Pincus.

In June 2023, it was reported that Next and Warburg Pincus were in talks to sell their controlling stakes in the business.

In September 2023, Next plc announced that it had agreed to acquire the entirety of Warburg Pincus's 34% interest in the Reiss Group for total consideration of £128m. Upon completion of the transaction, expected to take place in mid-October 2023, Next PLC's holding in the Reiss business will increase from 51% to 72%. The Reiss family's holding will increase to 22% and the Reiss management team will hold 6% equity in the business.
