= Northeastern Maritime Historical Foundation =

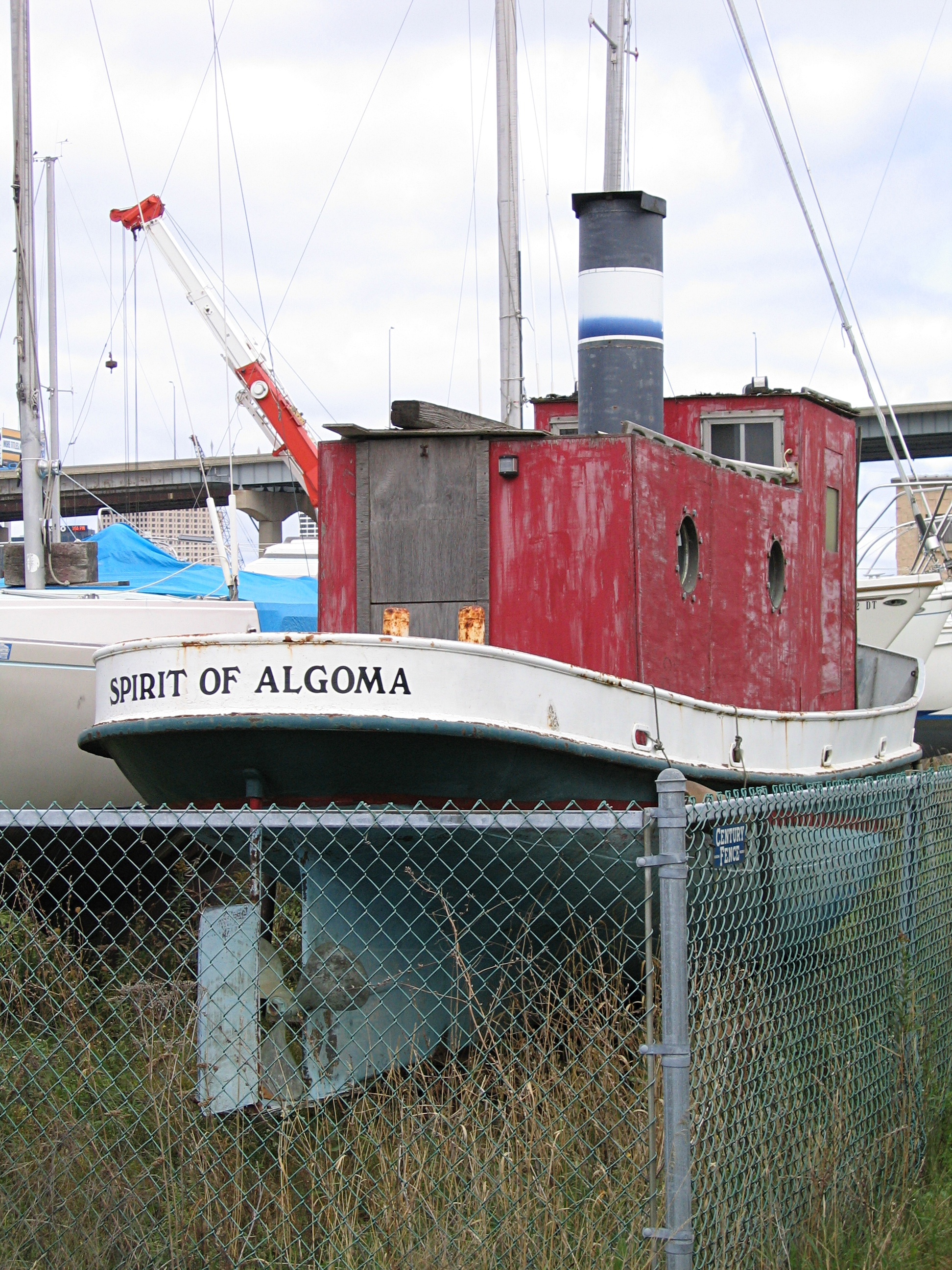
The 1913 steam-powered tugboat the Spirit of Algoma is part of the collection of the foundation.

The Northeastern Maritime Historical Foundation is a non-profit organization established to preserve historic vessels. The Foundation has assembled steam-powered vessels in Duluth, Minnesota.

In 2005 some of the Foundation's vessels were still being leased for use. The former United States Coast Guard icebreaker USCG Snohomish was leased in 2005 to serve as a commercial icebreaker.

Other vessels in the foundation's collection include the 1913 steam-powered tug the Spirit of Algoma and the 1916 steam-powered tug Reiss.
