= Reiss relation =

Algebraic geometry theorem

In algebraic geometry, the Reiss relation, introduced by Reiss (1837), is a condition on the second-order elements of the points of a plane algebraic curve meeting a given line.

== Statement ==
If C is a complex plane curve given by the zeros of a polynomial f(x,y) of two variables, and L is a line meeting C transversely and not meeting C at infinity, then

$$\sum\frac{f_{xx}f_y^2-2f_{xy}f_xf_y+f_{yy}f_x^2}{f_y^3}=0$$

where the sum is over the points of intersection of C and L, and f_{x}, f_{xy} and so on stand for partial derivatives of f (Griffiths & Harris 1994, p. 675). This can also be written as

$$\sum\frac{\kappa}{\sin(\theta)^3}=0$$

where κ is the curvature of the curve C and θ is the angle its tangent line makes with L, and the sum is again over the points of intersection of C and L (Griffiths & Harris 1994, p. 677).
