= David Reiss (psychiatrist) =

American psychiatrist

David Reiss (1937) is a psychiatrist and researcher. He is a clinical professor at the Yale Child Study Center. His most notable contribution to the field came in 1981, when he published his book, The Family's Construction of Reality.

== Family construing ==
The term "family paradigm" is used by the author to define a set of shared beliefs and views that every family has, even though they are mainly present at a subliminal level. His research started off as a way to investigate whether some aspects of family life had influences over the development of schizophrenia in the offspring of the family. Three different types of families were participants in numerous experiments: families without any psychopathological diagnosis, families with offspring (age 12 to 30) who had character disorders, and families with offspring that had been diagnosed with schizophrenia. Preliminary studies showed that families, when given tasks that dealt with gathering, interpreting and communicating information, differed from one another in ways that could be interpreted as an extension of George Kelly's concept of personal construct, thus becoming shared constructs. Reiss states that shared construing always happens, and follows very specific interaction patterns that the family has carefully but subconsciously created throughout its life. The types of constructs the family forms are directly derived from the interaction of three polar variables:

- Configuration (ability to grasp the complexity of patterns underlying in the environment, going from "subtle, detailed or highly structured" to "coarse, simple or chaotic");
- Coordination (which "refers to family member's ability and willingness to develop problem solutions similar to each others",);
- Closure (which "refers to the family's proclivity for suspending or applying order and coherent concepts to raw sensory experience",).

By crossing these variables we could possibly obtain eight different types of families, but the authors investigate only four possible configurations, thus dividing families on the basis of their shared construing of the laboratory experience:

- Environment-sensitive families (families without psychopathology, scoring high on all three dimensions)
- Consensus-sensitive families (families with schizophrenic offspring, scoring high on coordination, but low on both closure and configuration)
- Distance-sensitive families (families with delinquential or characterial problems, scoring low on all three dimensions)
- Achievement-sensitive families (families characterized by a very high competitivity between its members, scoring high on both configuration and closure, but low on coordination).

== Family paradigm and crisis ==
According to Reiss, the family has underlying patterns imbued in itself, which shape these family constructs; the author calls these patterns "family paradigms". They are built through family crisis; when a family enters a state of dissonance that threatens to destroy it, some parts of its paradigm become obsolete, while others rise to help the family get out of the crisis; those parts of the construct that survive the crisis become so relevant and strongly embedded in the life of the family, that they become organizers of the life of the family from that point on, up to the next crisis. Family paradigms differ, much like constructs, on three dimensions:

- Coherence (referred to the way the family perceives the world: stable or intrinsically moving)
- Integration (referred to how the family perceives the access its members have to the processes underlying in the environment: universal means the family as a whole can access them, particular means the single members may have access)
- Reference (referred to the conception of where the stimuli come from: from the outside world, or from inside the family)

The paradigm, then, is the kernel of each family's shared construing of every social situation, and it serves as an organizer of every aspect of its life, even though it operates mostly at a subliminal level. It is preserved, even over long periods of time, by means of two kinds of processes: ceremonials (which are highly emotional, symbolic, episodic rituals performed by the family as a whole), and pattern regulators (which, on the other hand, are non-symbolic, delegatable, continuous routines). Thus, through the routinization of time and space, the family paradigm is constantly reasserted, and thus kept alive.

== Cycle hypothesis ==
The process that goes through the crisis, undermines the old paradigm and shapes a new one, which in turn will allow the family a new set of shared constructs, is circular. Shared constructs, in fact, will shape interaction patterns with each family's social environment, thus creating the basis for new links with specific environments, which will again modify the shared constructs the family has built.
