= David Reiss (fashion retailer) =

British businessman

- Born: May 1943 (age 83); London, England
- Known for: Founder, Reiss
- Spouse: Rosemary Reiss (died 2024)
- Children: 3

David Anthony Reiss (born May 1943) is the founder of the British global fashion chain Reiss.

According to The Sunday Times Rich List in 2019, Reiss is worth £240 million.

== Early life ==
David Anthony Reiss was born to a Jewish family in May 1943. His father, Joshua Reiss, operated a store in Bishopsgate that was founded by his uncle, Samuel Reiss (born 1903) who was an immigrant from a south-eastern Polish shtetl in Radomyśl Wielki. His family were members of the orthodox Raleigh Close (Hendon United Synagogue) and Reiss studied at Carmel College, a former Jewish boarding school in Oxfordshire.

== Career ==
Reiss took over his father's gentlemen's outfitters on the corner of Bishopsgate and Petticoat Lane in the City of London, in 1971, when he was in his 20s. He then moved on to manufacturing, and in 1980 opened a flagship store in Chelsea selling his eponymous brand, as well as establishing a factory in Wakefield producing his clothes. Reiss remained chairman of the firm until 2021, when he resigned at the age of 78 and was replaced by former Next CEO Simon Wolfson, having been retained following a majority stake in the business being sold to the American private equity firm Warburg Pincus for £230 million in 2016. Reiss and his family retain a "significant stake" in Reiss Limited, and are also involved in a range of philanthropic causes following their departure from the management of the business.

== Personal life ==
Reiss is married to Rosemary Reiss; they have three children: Ali Reiss, Debra Reiss and Darren Reiss, and lives in Hampstead, London. Reiss's son is a director at HSBC and is married to Abi Reiss. His daughter, Debra, worked for the chain in Los Angeles until her death from a long-term illness in 2015. David's eldest daughter Ali was involved in the business for many years before leaving in her 30s to concentrate on her children.

His "only extravagance" is a Bentley.
