= USCGC Saginaw =

Pamlico-class 160-foot Inland Construction Tender of the United States Coast Guard

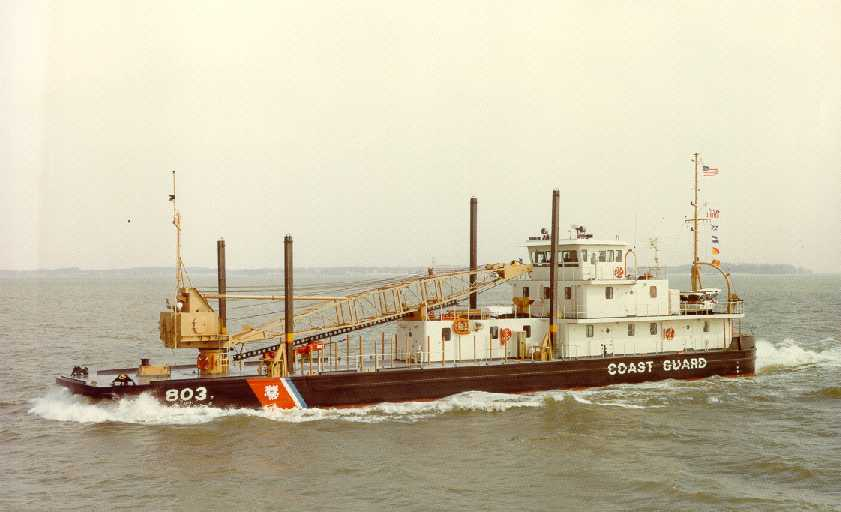

History

United States
- Name: Saginaw
- Namesake: Saginaw River

General characteristics
- Class & type: Pamlico-class inland construction tender
- Displacement: 460 long tons (470 t)
- Length: 160 ft (49 m)
- Beam: 34 ft (10 m)
- Draft: 8 ft (2.4 m)
- Propulsion: 2 × diesel engines
- Speed: 11 knots (20 km/h; 13 mph)
- Range: 5,300 nmi (9,800 km; 6,100 mi)
- Complement: 14

USCGC Saginaw (WLIC-803) is a Pamlico-class 160-foot inland construction tender of the United States Coast Guard that is primarily tasked with maintaining aids to navigation (ATON) along coastal and inland waterways as well as providing search and rescue (SAR) assistance. Since the 1970s, Saginaw has been homeported at Mobile, Alabama and has served the Gulf Coast region between Alabama and Florida under the Eighth Coast Guard District. The vessel is named after the Saginaw River in Michigan and is the second vessel for the U.S. Coast Guard to bear the name.

== Construction and design ==
The vessel was built at the United States Coast Guard Yard in Baltimore, Maryland. The vessel was commissioned on September 22, 1977, with the hull number WLIC-803. She displaces 460 long tons (470 t) and measures 160 feet (49 m) with a beam of 34 feet (10 m). Her draft measures roughly 8 feet (2.4 m). She is powered by two diesel engines to achieve a top speed of 11 knots (20 km/h; 13 mph) with an operational range of roughly 5,300 nautical miles (9,800 km; 6,100 mi). She features a self-contained construction tender with a working deck, tool storage, and an onboard crane to maintain and relocate navigation buoys. She is crewed by a complement of 14 personnel. The vessel does not contain a fixed armament but does contain one man-portable .50-caliber M2 machine gun and multiple crew-operated M240 GPMG weapons.

== Service ==
Since her commissioning in the 1970s, the vessel has primarily operated along the Gulf Coast of the United States and also serves the Gulf Intercoastal Waterway and surrounding coastal rivers and canals. The vessel has also supported shoreline restoration and hurricane recovery efforts. Between March and May 2025, the vessel underwent a substantial dry-dock upgrade to the vessel and her work barge. During her time in dry dock, multiple systems including the propeller, hull, and rudder her inspected, repaired, and updated.
