= USCGC Manowar =

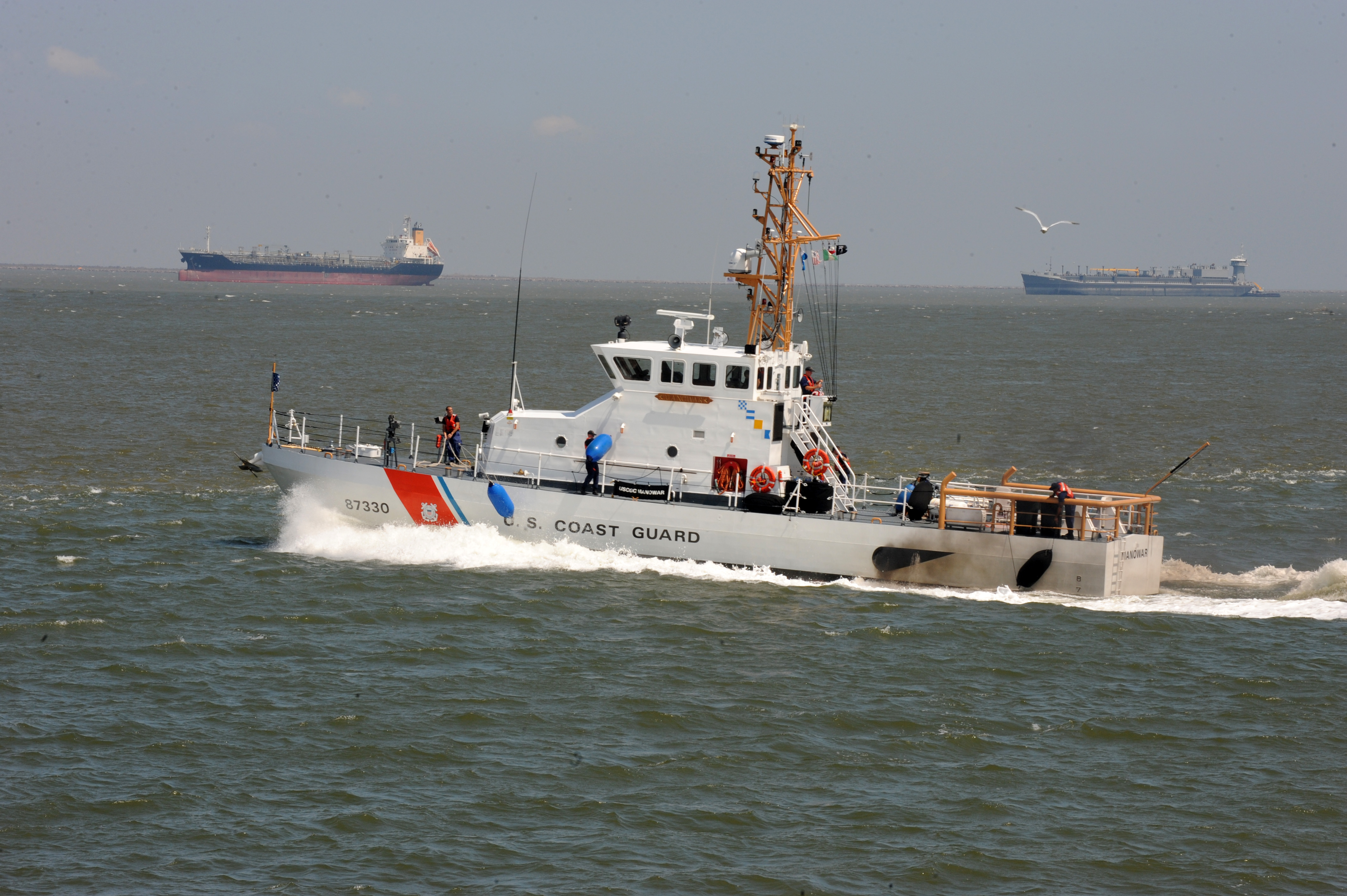

History

United States
- Name: USCGC Manowar
- Commissioned: 2001
- Home port: Mobile, Alabama
- Identification: MMSI number: 366999666; Callsign: NJQA
- Status: in active service

General characteristics
- Displacement: 91 long tons (92 t)
- Length: 87 ft 0 in (26.5 m)
- Beam: 19 ft 5 in (5.9 m)
- Draft: 5 ft 7 in (1.7 m)
- Propulsion: 2 × MTU diesels
- Speed: 25 knots (46 km/h)
- Range: 900 nmi (1,700 km)
- Endurance: 5 days
- Complement: 10
- Armament: 2 × .50 caliber M2 Browning machine guns

USCGC Manowar (WPB-87330) is an 87-foot (27 m) long Marine Protector-class patrol boat of the United States Coast Guard built by Bollinger Shipyards in Lockport, Louisiana and was the thirtieth vessel commissioned in her class. Manowar is homeported at Mobile, Alabama, and her primary missions are ports, waterways and coastal security, search and rescue, law enforcement, marine environmental response, recreational boating safety and military readiness. She was commissioned in 2001.

== See also ==
- List of United States Coast Guard cutters
