= Superior Engines & Compressors =

Superior Engines is a brand of industrial combustion engines that has a history which stretches back to 1889 when Patrick J Shouvlin opened a small industrial engineering shop in Springfield, Ohio. In an effort to capitalize on the growing need for oil pumping engines, P. J. Shouvlin developed and sold his first gas engine for oilfield pumping applications. Twenty-five years later, the Superior Gas Engine Company was selling a line of engines which ranged from 20 to 100 horsepower (75 kW).

Throughout the 1920s the company employed a staff of roughly 500 individuals and was said to be the largest singly owned company in the world according to the Clark County Historical Society.

In the early 1960s a line of Superior compressors specifically designed to operate with Superior gas engines was manufactured. In addition, these Superior compressors could also be operated with a turbine or motor-driven. Throughout the 1960s, refinements to existing engine and compressor lines continued. As part of these enhancements, twelve- and sixteen-cylinder V-engines were developed. These engines ranged from 400-2,650 horsepower and could be used for powering compressors, generators, blowers or pumps. Cooper Machinery Services is the current original equipment manufacturer for Superior engines and compressors.
