= USCGC Snohomish (WYTM-98) =

History

United States
- Namesake: Snohomish, Washington
- Builder: Ira S. Bushey & Son
- Laid down: 25 January 1944
- Commissioned: 24 January 1944
- Stricken: 4 April 1986
- Identification: IMO number: 8971384

General characteristics
- Length: 110 ft (34 m)
- Beam: 26.5 ft (8.1 m)
- Draft: 12.5 ft (3.8 m)
- Installed power: 2 × 60 kilowatts (80 hp) diesels

USCGC Snohomish (WYTM 98) was a United States Coast Guard icebreaker. She was the second Coast Guard vessel of that name. She was commissioned on 24 January 1944, served in Boston for the duration of World War II, and until 1947, when she was transferred to Rockland, Maine.

On 11 January 1980 the former commander and several crew members were commended for service in New York City, during the height of a garbage collection strike.

In 1986 she was sold, served as a commercial vessel, as a yacht, and later as a commercial vessel, being seized in 2004 by the Santoro Oil Company for unpaid bills. In 1998 she was renamed Sarah Rose and in 2002 as Dami Dew. Santoro Oil donated her to the Northeastern Maritime Historical Foundation in February 2004. The foundation leased her for another season of commercial use in 2005, but she needed rescue herself.

== Awards ==
- American Campaign Medal
- World War II Victory Medal
- National Defense Service Medal with star
