= Kathleen A. McGrath =

American US Navy officer and ship commander

Captain Kathleen A. McGrath
- Born: June 4, 1952; Columbus, Ohio, US
- Died: September 26, 2002 (aged 50); Bethesda, Maryland, US
- Resting place: Arlington National Cemetery
- Education: California State University, Sacramento
- Occupations: US Navy officer and ship commander
- Known for: First woman to command a United States Navy warship.
- Spouse: Gregory H. Brandon
- Children: 2
- Military career
- Allegiance: United States
- Branch: United States Navy
- Rank: Captain

Kathleen Anne McGrath (June 4, 1952 – September 26, 2002) was the first woman to command a United States Navy warship.

== Early life ==
On June 4, 1952, McGrath was born in Columbus, Ohio. McGrath's father is Colonel James H. McGrath. McGrath's mother is Martha McGrath.

== Education ==
In 1975, McGrath earned a Bachelor of Science degree in Environmental Science from California State University, Sacramento. McGrath attended Officer Candidate School in Rhode Island. In 1987, McGrath earned a Master of Arts degree in Educational Management from Stanford University.

== Career ==
McGrath worked in the United States Forestry Service until 1980 when she joined the US Navy. McGrath was deployed to the Western Pacific, the Persian Gulf and the Mediterranean and Caribbean seas.

McGrath commanded the rescue and salvage ship USS Recovery in 1993 and 1994. Lieutenant Commander Darlene Iskra commanded a sister ship USS Opportune earlier, in 1990. These ships were commissioned US Navy ships, although not technically "combatant" ships as they did not have offensive weaponry.

In December 1998, Captain McGrath became commander of the frigate USS Jarrett. She was the first woman to command was US Navy combatant ship. She was one of the group of five women, including Michelle J. Howard, Maureen Farren, Ann O'Connor, and Grace Mehl, chosen to be the first female combatant commanders in the United States Navy.

In the spring of 2000, it was just six years after Congress revoked rules prohibiting women from serving on combat aircraft and warships. On March 31, 2000, McGrath commanded USS Jarrett and set to sea from San Diego, California with a destination of the Persian Gulf region. Its goal was to hunt boats suspected of smuggling Iraqi oil in violation of United Nations sanctions.

In May 2002, McGrath was promoted to the rank of captain.

Following her tour as commander of the Jarrett, McGrath served at the Joint Advanced Warfighting Unit in Alexandria, Virginia.

Captain McGrath died in September 2002 at the age of 50.

== Awards ==
- Legion of Merit
- Meritorious Service Medal with three gold stars (4 awards)
- Navy Commendation Medal with 2 gold stars
- Navy Achievement Medal
- Joint Meritorious Unit Award
- Meritorious Unit Citation
- Navy E Ribbon
- National Defense Service Medal with star
- Armed Forces Expeditionary Medal
- Southwest Asia Service Medal with star
- Sea Service Deployment Ribbon
- Navy Overseas Service Ribbon
- Kuwait Liberation Medal

== Personal life ==
McGrath's husband was Gregory H. Brandon. They have two children.

On September 26, 2002, McGrath died from lung cancer at the National Naval Medical Center in Bethesda, Maryland. She was 50 years old. McGrath is buried in Arlington National Cemetery.
