= List of ship commissionings in 1946 =

The list of ship commissionings in 1946 includes a chronological list of all ships decommissioned in 1946.

	Operator	Ship	Class and type	Pennant	Other notes
15 January	United States Navy	USS Palau	Commencement Bay-class escort carrier	CVE-122	
25 January	Royal Navy	HMS Warrior	Majestic-class aircraft carrier	31	
27 February	United States Navy	USS Sicily	Commencement Bay-class escort carrier	CVE-118	
2 March	United States Navy	USS Kearsarge	Essex-class aircraft carrier	CV-33	
14 March	Royal Canadian Navy	HMCS Warrior	Majestic-class aircraft carrier	CVL 20	Former HMS Warrior
23 March	Royal Netherlands Navy	HNLMS Karel Doorman	Majestic-class aircraft carrier	CVL 20	
11 April	United States Navy	USS Tusk	Balao-class submarine	SS-427	
11 April	United States Navy	USS Leyte	Essex-class aircraft carrier	CV-32	
11 May	United States Navy	USS Philippine Sea	Essex-class aircraft carrier	CV-47	
15 May	United States Navy	USS Recovery	Bolster-class rescue and salvage ship	ARS-43	
14 July	United States Navy	USS Saipan	Saipan-class light aircraft carrier	CVL-48	
3 November	United States Navy	USS Valley Forge	Essex-class aircraft carrier	CV-45	
Date uncertain	French Navy	Arromanches	Colossus-class aircraft carrier	R95	Loaned from the Royal Navy; former HMS Colossus
Date uncertain	Royal Canadian Navy	HMCS Magnificent	Majestic-class aircraft carrier	CVL 21	Purchased from the Royal Navy
