= USS Hoist =

United States Navy rescue ship

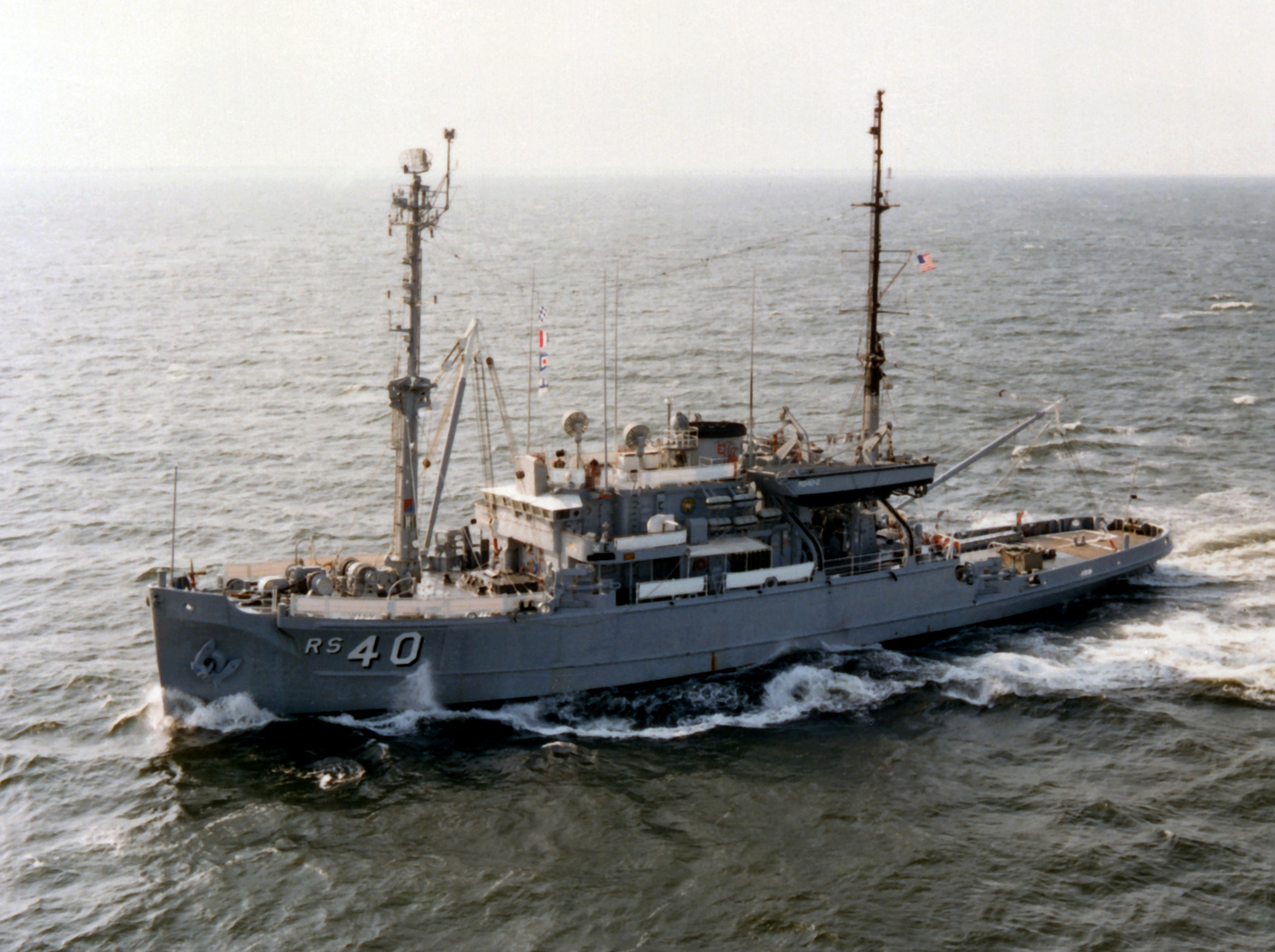

History

United States
- Builder: Basalt Rock Company
- Laid down: 13 September 1944
- Launched: 31 March 1945
- Commissioned: 21 July 1945
- Decommissioned: 30 September 1994
- Stricken: 30 September 1994
- Fate: Sold for scrapping, 17 July 2007

General characteristics
- Tonnage: 1,441 tons
- Displacement: 1,497 tons(lt), 2,048 tons(fl)
- Length: 213 ft 6 in (65.07 m)
- Beam: 39 ft (12 m)
- Draught: 14 ft 8 in (4.47 m)
- Propulsion: diesel-electric, twin screws, 2,780hp
- Speed: 15 knots
- Complement: 120
- Armament: two 40 mm guns

USS Hoist (ARS-40) was a Bolster-class rescue and salvage ship acquired by the United States Navy during World War II. Her task was to come to the aid of stricken vessels.

Hoist was launched 31 March 1945 by the Basalt Rock Company shipyard near Napa, California; sponsored by Mrs. William E. Howard; and commissioned 21 July 1945.

== End-of-World War II operations ==
After shakedown Hoist sailed from San Francisco, California, 6 September 1945 to begin salvage operations in the Far East.

== Pacific Ocean operations ==
Hoist arrived at Buckner Bay, Okinawa, on 11 October and commenced salvage and repair duties until 23 December. Two days later she arrived at Wakanoura Wan and operated there, and at Sasebo until 15 March 1946.

== North Atlantic operations ==
Hoist returned to San Pedro, California, 1 June and sailed for Norfolk, Virginia, 15 July. After overhaul she sailed to Bayonne, New Jersey, and was used for training students at the Naval Training Salvage School until 23 February. From March 1947 to December 1948, Hoist continued salvage operations along the East and Gulf coasts. She sailed 8 December for Narsak, Greenland, where she operated for two weeks before returning to Bayonne.

In mid-January 1949 she sailed for the Azores to repair an underwater pipeline, returning 16 March. Hoist sailed 23 March to tow targets for aircraft squadron exercises off Bermuda, then sailed 9 May for the Virginia Capes for training operations. Hoist now based her operations out of Norfolk, Virginia, and on 9 August steamed to assist the USS Simon Newcomb (AGSC-14), aground in Mother Burns Cove, Labrador. Towing the vessel to Argentia, Newfoundland, Hoist resumed her salvage and repair duties out of Norfolk, with annual deployments to the North Atlantic and periodic operations in the Caribbean and Florida waters. In addition to her salvage and repair services she acted as station ship, performed towing operations, and engaged in amphibious exercises.

From early 1960 through 1964, Hoist continued similar services, but concentrated on local salvage duties out of Norfolk and operations in Florida and the Caribbean.

== Searching for the Thresher ==
From 29 May through 25 August 1964, Hoist operated with Trieste II at the site of the Thresher (SSN-593) tragedy. Next, performing one of her many rescues, Hoist along with Seneca (ATF-92) and Windlass (ARS(D)-4), freed Blue Jacket (T-AF-51), which had grounded 2 March 1965. Blue Jacket was pulled free in two days, saving her perishable cargo of frozen stores valued at $2,000,000. From 11 October to 12 November, Hoist was busy with towing operations, when ordered to assist in the salvage of Alamogordo (ARDM-2), a floating drydock attached to the Polaris program. Hoist and Recovery (ARS-43) raised Alamogordo in three weeks. For the remainder of the year Hoist was active in local salvage duties.

== Recovering an H-bomb off the Spanish coast ==
On 16 February 1966 Hoist arrived at Palomares, Spain, to take part in the recovery of an H-bomb. The unarmed weapon was dropped when a B-52 Stratofortress and KC-135 flying tanker collided. This recovery is a key event in the movie Men of Honor. On 7 April after successful completion of the mission Hoist returned to Norfolk, where she arrived 4 May. Hoist performed salvage operations in the Virginia Capes area into 1967.

== Decommissioning ==
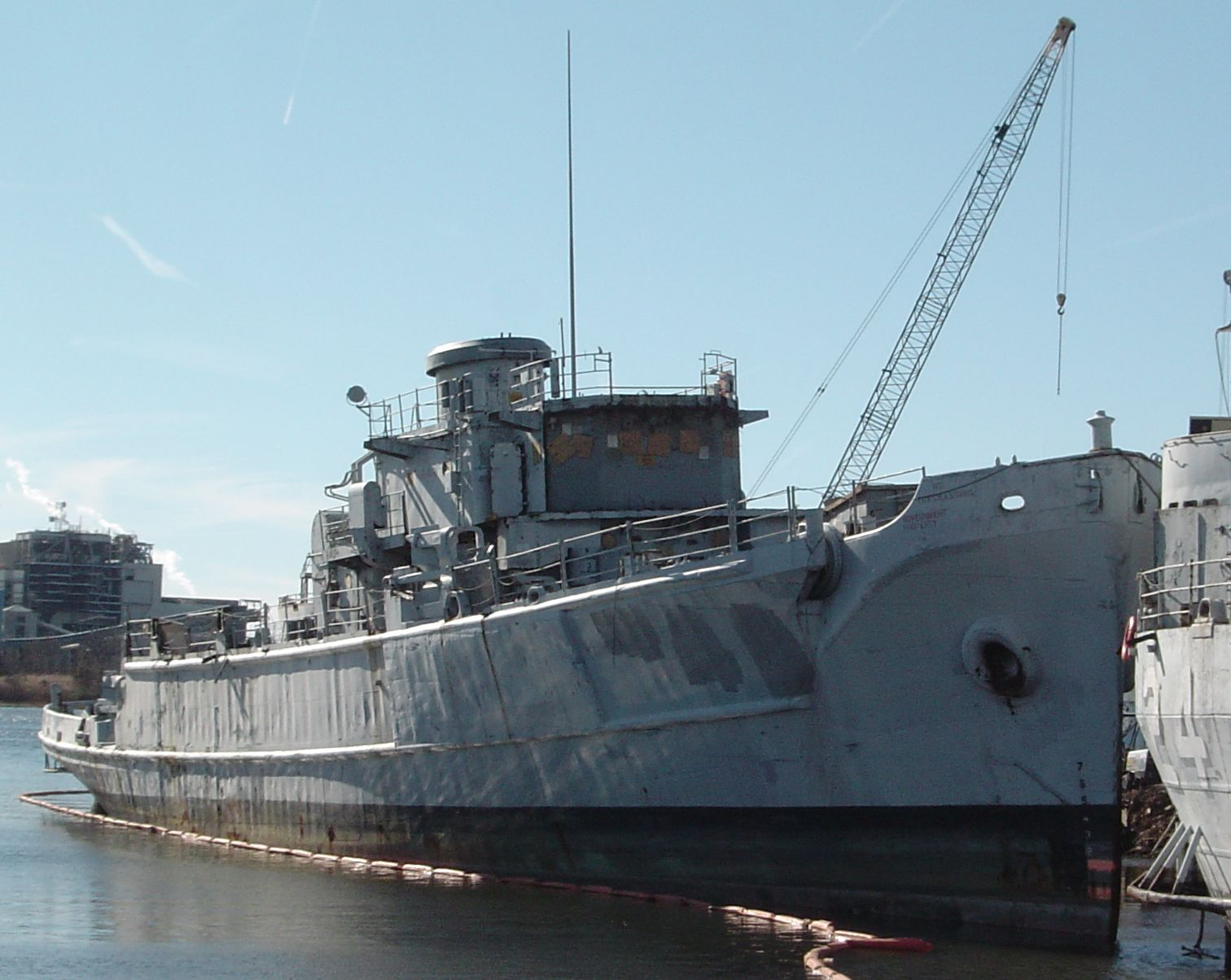
USS Hoist at Bay Bridge Enterprises, Chesapeake, Virginia

Hoist was decommissioned and struck from the Naval Register, 30 September 1994. Her title was transferred to the Maritime Administration, 29 November 2001. She was laid up in the National Defense Reserve Fleet, James River Group, Lee Hall, Virginia. The ship was sold for scrapping on 17 July 2007, for $61,000 to North American Ship Recycling, Sparrows Point, Maryland.

After North American Recycling closed its doors, the Hoist was left abandoned. The vessel was acquired by Bay Bridge Enterprises of Chesapeake, Virginia, with the company being paid $95,000 for the disposal. The vessel was towed to their Chesapeake yard, arriving on 1 December 2007.

== Military awards and honors ==
The Navy record does not currently list battle stars for Hoist. However, her crew was eligible for the following medals, ribbons, and commendations:

- Secretary of the Navy Letter of Commendation (3)
- Navy Unit Commendation (2)
- Navy Meritorious Unit Commendation (2)
- Battle "E" Ribbon (5)
- Navy Expeditionary Medal (Cuba)
- American Campaign Medal
- Asiatic–Pacific Campaign Medal
- World War II Victory Medal
- Navy Occupation Service Medal (with Asia clasp)
- National Defense Service Medal
- Armed Forces Expeditionary Medal (Cuba, 2-Lebanon)
