= USS Reclaimer =

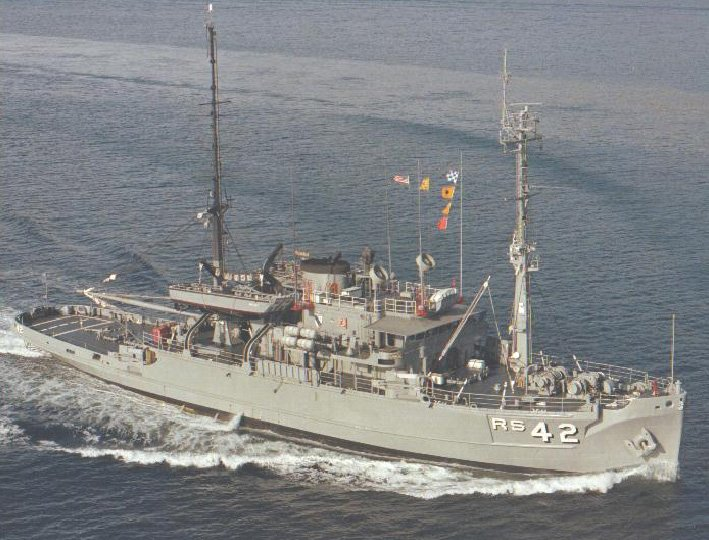
- USS Reclaimer

History

United States
- Name: USS Reclaimer
- Builder: Basalt Rock Company
- Laid down: 10 November 1944
- Launched: 23 June 1945
- Commissioned: 20 December 1945
- Decommissioned: 23 June 1947
- Recommissioned: 1 December 1950
- Decommissioned: 16 September 1994
- Stricken: 16 September 1994
- Home port: None
- Honours and awards: 5 battle stars (Korea); 8 campaign stars (Vietnam)
- Fate: Dismantled in October 2011 in Brownsville, TX

General characteristics
- Class & type: Bolster-class rescue and salvage ship
- Displacement: 2,160 long tons (2,195 t) full
- Length: 213 ft 6 in (65.07 m)
- Beam: 43 ft (13 m)
- Draft: 14 ft (4.3 m)
- Propulsion: Diesel-electric, twin screws, 2,780 hp (2,073 kW)
- Speed: 16 knots (30 km/h; 18 mph)
- Complement: 120
- Armament: 4 × 40 mm guns

USS Reclaimer (ARS-42), was a Bolster-class rescue and salvage ship of the United States Navy. It was the only ship of the US Navy to be named Reclaimer.

== Service history ==
=== 1940s ===
Reclaimer (ARS-42) was laid down on 10 November 1944 by Basalt Rock Company in Napa, California; launched 23 June 1945; sponsored by Mrs. Daniel Clark Jr.; and commissioned on 20 December 1945.

After shakedown off San Pedro, Reclaimer steamed to Pearl Harbor where she operated until assigned to Joint Task Force 1, arriving at Bikini on 1 June 1946. There she served as salvage vessel and was contaminated during the "Operation Crossroads" atomic tests, but received final radiological clearance on 13 January 1947. She returned to Pearl Harbor in September 1946 and to the west coast in October where she remained until decommissioned 23 June 1947. She was assigned to the Pacific Reserve Fleet and berthed at San Diego.

=== 1950s ===
Reclaimer recommissioned on 1 December 1950 for service in the Korean War and, after shakedown off San Diego towed AP-23 to Hawaii. Arriving at Pearl Harbor on 12 February 1951, she then proceeded on across the Pacific touched at Majuro and Guam, and reached Sasebo, Japan on 29 April.

On 8 May Reclaimer got underway to aid SS Muhlenberg Victory, grounded on Uku Shima, an island near Sasebo. With the aid of Grasp, she re-floated the ship a week later and on 27 May towed YO-179 to Pusan, Korea. She then steamed to Wonsan for patrol duties between that port and Songjin. In mid-June, she escorted Walke, damaged by a mine, to Sasebo. Six days later, she returned to Pusan to tow the burning merchantman Plymouth Victory, back to Sasebo where the fire was extinguished. During August Reclaimer assisted in mine sweeping and laid buoys in Wonsan Harbor. On 7 September, she re-floated the beached Japanese LST Q 081 at Kangnung, Korea. On 10 October, with Yuma, she towed the Royal Navy hospital ship RFA Maine which had lost a propeller, on a westward passage through the crowded and narrow Shimonoseki Straits. This was the only hospital ship supporting U.N. forces at that time.

On 22 January 1952, she departed Yokosuka to return to her homeport, Pearl Harbor, where she remained until 21 October. Returning to WestPac with YC-104 in tow, Reclaimer reached Sasebo on 17 November. On 2 December she arrived at Sokeho Hang, Korea, to rescue two LST's aground in heavy seas. With one of the LST's in tow she reached Sasebo on 18 December. After brief duty with the Wonsan blockade force, Reclaimer took SS Gulf Haven in tow while she was foundering in a typhoon, and successfully brought her to Japan.

Reclaimer continued to operate in Japan and Korea until returning to San Diego on 25 July 1953. For the next three months she operated on the West Coast, steaming back to Pearl Harbor in late October. In March 1954, she headed southwest to the Marshall Islands for salvage work during "Operation Castle", the hydrogen bomb test series at Bikini. Departing Bikini on 4 May she continued on to Japan. Through the summer she operated in Japanese and Korean waters, then, during September and October, stood by off French Indochina while French and American ships, in "Operation Passage to Freedom", evacuated refugees from what was to become North Vietnam.

Returning to the United States, Reclaimer spent the first six months of 1955 operating off the West Coast, then deployed to the Far East. During early 1956, she operated in the Hawaiian Islands, reaching Yokosuka on 30 September. She returned to Pearl Harbor on 12 February 1957.

After freeing the grounded LST Chittenden County from Kauai, Hawaii, she again conducted salvage operations in the Far East from 12 July to 30 November. Returning to Pearl Harbor she began a two-month tour on the West Coast in February 1958 then, following further services at Hawaii, again set sail for a four-month deployment to WestPac. She returned to Pearl Harbor in August and to the West Coast in February 1959, but was back at Pearl after only a month. In June she deployed to WestPac, returning in September.

=== 1960s ===
Reclaimer spent early 1960 in the Hawaiian area, and installed underwater cables near Midway Atoll to detect missiles fired into the area. Then she steamed for Yokosuka on 6 September. Returning to Pearl Harbor on 21 December, she operated in the Hawaiian Islands until sailing for the Far East on 26 June. Back at Pearl Harbor in November, Reclaimer undertook several assignments.

Following an overhaul, Reclaimer steamed in May 1962 for Christmas Island and another nuclear test, "Operation Dominic", where she laid target moors and placed target rafts for the next two months. Arriving at Yokosuka on 6 October Reclaimer operated in the Far East until she returned to Hawaii early in 1963 and, with the exception of salvaging MV Shokafu at Pago Pago, Samoa, in March, operated there throughout the rest of the year.

Steaming back to Japan in January 1964, Reclaimer operated there and off Korea, Okinawa, and Taiwan before proceeding to Saigon to salvage USNS Card, which had been damaged in Saigon Harbor by Viet Cong mines. With Tawakoni, Reclaimer re-floated Card and towed her to the Philippines, then returned to Pearl Harbor on 22 June and remained there for the rest of 1964.

In 1965 Reclaimer participated in Operation Market Time off South Vietnam for two months, salvaged LST-559 in Da Nang Harbor, and performed various towing assignments, before returning to Pearl Harbor in July. In January 1966, she was off for WestPac again, and while so deployed was called on for three major salvage operations and for support in amphibious Operation Jackstay in rivers of the Rung Sat Special Zone. The first salvage job on this deployment was retracting the cargo ship SS Excellency stranded on Triton Island west of Subic Bay in the South China Sea. Reclaimer participated in the successful salvage of the Esso tanker SS Sea Raven off the beach of Chu Lai. Then, steaming south, she performed similar operations for merchantmen SS Grertrude Therese grounded at Afelie Island off northern Australia. She returned to Pearl Harbor on 29 August 1966, and on 9 November was underway for Oregon to work with the cable laying ship USS Aeolus. During this period Reclaimer stood off Port Townsend, Washington to receive a Puget Sound pilot. A visitor approached Reclaimer in a rowboat who identified himself as the first CO of Reclaimer. He was welcomed aboard for a coffee and visit. She returned from the West Coast to Pearl Harbor a month later. Between deployments Reclaimer was tasked in dumping four very large and dozens of small steel barrels filled with concrete and radioactive waste at a location about 400 miles SW of Pearl Harbor.

In March 1967 Reclaimer rescued SS Norbega, dead in the water west of Midway, before deploying to WestPac in April. In June she laid a special radar reflecting buoy in the Gulf of Tonkin to aid SAR patrol ships in navigation. She continued operations off Taiwan and Vietnam, including the salvage of South Vietnamese LSM-406 aground at Phan Thiết, until returning to Pearl Harbor at the end of 1967.

After spending the first half of 1968 in Pearl Harbor Reclaimer arrived at Da Nang, South Vietnam, on 29 August for standby salvage duty. In September she salvaged LCV-1616 and in October LCU-1676. Returning to the West Coast in mid-1969, she deployed to WestPac again at the end of the year.

=== 1970s ===
Reclaimer then operated off Vietnam for the whole of 1970, entering Pearl Harbor, Hawaii, on 17 March 1971. At Pearl Harbor Reclaimer underwent regular overhaul and, subsequent to overhaul, engaged in salvage and refresher training. In February 1972, she was re-deployed to WestPac, returning to Hawaii in late August. She remained in the Pearl Harbor area throughout 1972 and the first six months of 1973. In July 1973, she steamed westward again for deployment, spending the last six months of 1973 in the western Pacific. As of late January 1974, Reclaimer was making the passage from Apra, Guam, to Pearl Harbor.

In June–July 1977, Reclaimer sailed to Adak, Alaska to assist the USNS Meyer in oceanographic research. In Sept-Oct, Reclaimer worked with an experimental RUWS (Remote Unmanned Work System.)

'History needed from 1978-1994.

=== late 1980s ===
Reclaimer was refurbished and returned to service in the late 1980s by the men and women of the Shore Intermediate Maintenance Activity at Pearl Harbor Hawaii (SIMAPH). The Commanding Officer of the Reclaimer awarded SIMAPH's personnel with the Meritorious Unit Commendation for returning the Reclaimer to service ahead schedule and under budget.

In 1985 Reclaimer was tasked to conduct overt intelligence collection operations, code named "Pony Express", against Russian naval auxiliary ships operating in the Pacific Broad Ocean Area (BOA) west of Midway Island. Reclaimer conducted photographic and electronic intelligence intercept of Russian ICBM warheads, equipped with telemetry capsules, during their re-entry phase thru the atmosphere and striking geographic coordinates simulating targets within the Russian ships operating area. The one-way transit took more time than the ship was on-station monitoring the re-entry operations, and the overall 70-day deployment ensured the ship's crew earned sea pay before returning to home port, Pearl Harbor, Hawaii. Later, Reclaimer was assigned additional intelligence collection missions around Oahu and the Hawaiian Islands during the presence of Russian intelligence collection ships, or AGIs, while in and around Hawaiian waters.

Reclaimer was decommissioned and simultaneously struck from the Naval Register on 16 September 1994. She was transferred to the Maritime Commission (MARAD) on 28 July 2001, for lay up in the National Defense Reserve Fleet, at Suisun Bay, Benicia, California. She was withdrawn from the Reserve Fleet on 28 November 2006, and transferred to Concord Naval Weapons Station, California for SINKEX preparation. On 12 April 2011, a contract was issued by MARAD to Marine Metals of Brownsville, Texas, to dismantle Reclaimer for $462,223.31. Reclaimer departed the Suisun Bay Reserve Fleet on 16 May 2011 to be cleaned at BAE Systems San Francisco Ship Repair. Reclaimer was towed to Brownsville upon completion of the cleaning and was completely dismantled on 14 October 2011.

== Awards ==
Reclaimer earned five battle stars for Korean War service and eight campaign stars for Vietnam.
