= Attack on USNS Card =

Part of the Vietnam War (1964)

- Part of the Vietnam War
Date	2 May 1964
Location	Saigon Port, South Vietnam 10.765°N 106.710°E
Result	Viet Cong victory

Belligerents
Viet Cong	United States

Commanders and leaders
Lâm Sơn Náo	Captain Borge Langeland

Units involved
65th Special Operations Group	USNS Card

Strength
2 commandos	1 escort carrier

Casualties and losses
None	1 escort carrier damaged 5 U.S. civilian employees killed.

The attack on USNS Card was a Viet Cong (VC) operation during the Vietnam War. It took place in Saigon Port in the early hours of 2 May 1964, and was mounted by commandos from the 65th Special Operations Group (Vietnamese: Đội Biệt động 65).

Card was first commissioned into the United States Navy during World War II. Decommissioned in 1946, Card was reactivated in 1958 and reentered service with the Military Sea Transport Service, transporting military equipment to South Vietnam as part of the United States military commitment to that country.

As a regular visitor to the port, Card became a target for local VC commando units. Shortly after midnight on 2 May 1964, two Viet Cong commandos climbed out of the sewer tunnel near the area where Card was anchored, and they attached two loads of explosives to the ship's hull. The attack was a success and Card sank in 48 feet (15 m) of water. Five civilian crew members were killed by the explosions. The ship was refloated 17 days later and towed to the Philippines for repairs.

== Background ==
USNS Card was a Bogue-class escort carrier that had served in the United States Navy. In 1946 Card was decommissioned and was transferred to the Atlantic Reserve Fleet. On 16 May 1958, Card re-entered service with the Military Sea Transport Service, under the control of the United States Navy. The ship was crewed by civilians and was prefixed "USNS" (United States Naval Ship) instead of "USS" (United States Ship) as it was in service but not commissioned.

With the escalation of the Vietnam War, the United States government stepped up military support for South Vietnam's fight against the Viet Cong. On 15 December 1961, USNS Card left Quonset Point, Rhode Island, with a cargo of H-21 Shawnee helicopters and U.S. soldiers from Fort Devens, Massachusetts, bound for Vietnam. At Subic Bay in the Philippines, the cargo and troops were transferred to USS Princeton, which arrived and unloaded off the coast of Đà Nẵng the following month.

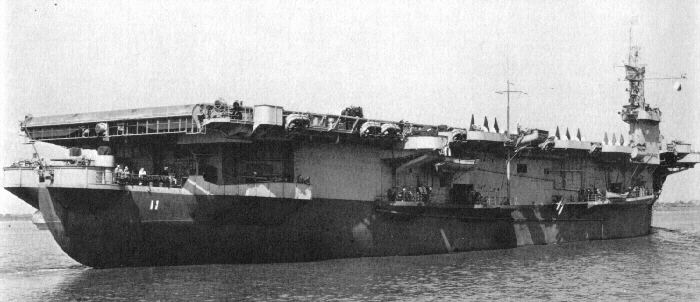
Card while in service with the United States Navy

From 1961 onwards, Card and USNS Core regularly docked in Saigon to unload heavy artillery, M113 armored personnel carriers, aircraft, helicopters and ammunition for the South Vietnamese government. The Port of Saigon was situated between the Tẻ and Bến Nghé canals, and was about 700 meters (2,300 ft) wide from one side to the other. To facilitate the arrival of Card and other American ships which pulled into Saigon, the South Vietnamese military often deployed navy vessels to conduct patrols around the port, while the surrounding shores were protected by an elite Army of the Republic of Vietnam (ARVN) Airborne battalion.

The port itself was guarded round the clock by Republic of Vietnam National Police, as undercover South Vietnamese agents operated across the river in the Thủ Thiêm area to disrupt VC activities there. Undeterred by the level of protection which the South Vietnamese government normally afforded to American ships, Trần Hải Phụng—commander of the Viet Cong's Saigon-Gia Dinh Military District—ordered the 65th Special Operations Group to attack USNS Card.

== Sinking of USNS Card ==
=== Failed attempt on USNS Core ===
Despite their efforts to control VC activities across the river in the Thủ Thiêm area, the South Vietnamese military and police could not stop VC agents from operating there. So VC members of the 65th Special Operations Group were able to watch US and South Vietnamese military activities at the port, while they were preparing to attack American targets. Lâm Sơn Náo, a commando of the 65th Special Operations Group, was also an electrician at the port facility.

As his unit was assigned with the mission to attack the carrier, Náo took advantage of his position as an employee at the port facility, to reconnoitre Card to design the best strategy to sabotage the ship and all the military hardware on board. Náo's father had previously worked at the port facility as a tradesman, so he memorized all the tunnels and sewage systems at the facility. He advised Náo that the best way to enter the area where American ships normally anchored was through the sewer tunnel opposite Thủ Thiêm.

While bathing in the Saigon River, Náo inspected the sewer tunnel, which his father had advised him to use. Náo concluded that the tunnel would provide the best access to the American area, but it also presented challenges. The sewage tunnel contained waste and toxic oils which could cause blindness, so Náo and his men would have to close their eyes as they moved through it to avoid blindness.

Náo and his men had to bathe to purge deadly odours to avoid detection, and probably arrest, by South Vietnamese authorities. After Náo had surveyed the tunnels leading to the port, he presented his plan to the Saigon-Gia Dinh Military District Headquarters. Nao decided to utilise high explosives, enough to sink a ship, and to detonate them using a timer so that his men could get away safely. Náo's superiors approved the plan and they ordered him to launch the attack before sunrise to avoid killing local Vietnamese civilians.

Náo returned to Saigon and began assembling the equipment required for the attack, which included C4 plastic explosives, TNT, wire, mine detonators and batteries. Náo trained new commandos, namely Nguyễn Phú Hùng (an electrician) and Nguyễn Văn Cậy (a mason), to support his operation. To ensure success, Náo measured the height, length and width of the sewer tunnel to assemble the bomb devices to the right size, to be carried through the tunnel unhindered.

Towards the end of 1963, Náo received news that Card had arrived in Saigon with another load of armored personnel carriers, artillery and aircraft. But the carrier turned out to be her sister ship, USNS Core. On the evening of 29 December 1963, Náo and Cậy carried their bomb devices, which had about 80 kilograms (180 lb) of explosives, through the sewer tunnel. They attached the explosives to Core's hull, set the timer and retreated into the sewer to await the outcome.

The bombs failed to explode because the battery had expired due to protracted storage. Determined the operation would remain a secret, the commandos snuck back to Core and retrieved the explosive devices. Soon, Core and its crew sailed from Saigon without any damage. Náo reported the mission failure to the Saigon-Gia Dinh Military District Headquarters. His superiors did not express disappointment in the failure, but they encouraged Náo and his men to destroy Card at all costs.

On 1 May 1964, Viet Cong reconnaissance teams spotted USNS Card as it sailed through Gành Rái Bay and entered Lòng Tàu River. They reported this information to the 65th Special Operations Group in Saigon. As usual, Card docked at the commercial port to unload a shipment of cargo and military helicopters, and pick up helicopters to be returned to the US.

=== Successful attack ===
When Náo received news Card had arrived in Saigon, he inspected the equipment which included a new battery and a redesigned bomb. Náo decided to set off the bombs during the early hours of 2 May, so that he and his fellow operative could escape safely and avoid inflicting casualties on the local population. Due to illness, Cậy declined to take part in the operation, so Hùng had to replace him.

At around 09:00 on 1 May, Náo went to Hùng's home, where the latter was given a hand grenade and was notified of an upcoming operation without much detail. At 18:00, after Náo had finished loading the bombs onto one canoe, he and Hùng traveled down the Saigon River in two separate canoes, toward the commercial port district. They pulled over in the Thủ Thiêm area.

To avoid detection by South Vietnamese authorities they mingled with the local workers. While awaiting the right time, Náo briefed Hùng on the objectives of the operation, which was to sink the largest American ship at the Saigon Port, and report the results to headquarters.

Shortly after 18:30 as both men headed toward Warehouse Number 0 at the commercial port, a police patrol boat spotted them and gave chase. Náo ordered Hùng to throw away the hand grenade and both men would retreat toward the local village if their bombs were discovered by police. The police patrol stopped about 20 meters (66 ft) away from Náo's canoe, and the patrol boat commander questioned both men about their activities during that evening.

Náo claimed that he and Hùng intended to go to the other side of the river to buy new clothes at the market. To avoid delaying the operation, Náo bribed the patrol boat commander 1000 Vietnamese dong. When the patrol boat commander received the bribe, he gave both Náo and Hùng permission to move on but demanded another bribe when they return. When the commandos arrived at the sewer tunnel, they assembled the bomb device with each man carrying 40 kilograms (88 lb) of explosives through the tunnel.

When the commandos emerged from the tunnel, they swam toward the broadside of Card which anchored near the sewer opening. Náo and Hùng attached two bombs to the ship, with one near the bilge and one at the engine compartment, just above the waterline. Náo then inspected both bombs to ensure proper assembly. Náo then stuck the battery onto a pole and connected it to the bombs with wires, then set the timer.

At 01:10, the bombs were completed and both commandos retreated to the sewer tunnel, boarded their canoes on the other side and rowed back to Thủ Thiêm. Again, the police patrol boat was waiting for Náo and Hùng to arrive, because the commander wanted another bribe. As Náo and Hùng approached the patrol boat, an explosion was heard and a bright light could be seen in the commercial port area. The South Vietnamese police patrol boat then started its engine and raced towards Card, instead of extracting another bribe.

== Aftermath ==
For the VC commandos of the 65th Special Operations Group, the explosion on Card signalled a successful mission. By sunrise, Card had settled 48 feet (15 m) into the river with its engine compartment completely flooded. Five American civilians who worked on the ship died as a result of the attack. Due to rapid response from the ship's crew and local authorities, flooding inside the ship was quickly stopped and it was stabilized. An inspection revealed that the explosion had torn a hole 12 feet (3.7 m) long and 3 feet (0.91 m) high, on the starboard side of the ship.

In the days that followed, five US Navy divers were deployed to Saigon from the Philippines, in addition to several salvage teams from US bases in Japan and the Military Sea Transport Service Command. Amongst the divers was founding US Navy SEALs member Roy Boehm, who claimed to have recovered the remains of a Hagerson Demolition Pack, a specialized explosive charge used by US Navy frogmen. Boehm speculated that the explosives used in the attack had been stolen from his own South Vietnamese Navy unit by a group of deserters who had been mistreated by a South Vietnamese officer.

USS Reclaimer, a rescue and salvage ship, bound for the Philippines, was ordered to change course and sail for Saigon. The tugboat USS Tawakoni based at Subic Bay in the Philippines was placed on standby, and later received orders to sail to South Vietnam. Upon arrival in Saigon, US Navy divers and salvage teams tried to pump water from Card's flooded compartments.

Their initial attempts were hindered by malfunctions in the pumping equipment, and poor diving conditions in the river. It took salvors 17 days to refloat Card. They then began the process of moving the ship by installing a 6-inch pump and generators in Card to pump bilge water. Reclaimer and Tawakoni then towed Card to Subic Bay where it underwent further repairs.

After Card was sunk, North Vietnam made use of the incident for propaganda purposes. On 20 October 1964, the North Vietnamese government issued a postage stamp which proclaimed an "Aircraft Carrier of America sunk in the Harbor of Saigon", to praise the Viet Cong commandos who carried out the attack. The US Navy refused to admit Card had been sunk even for a brief period of time, instead stating Card was damaged and quickly repaired.

For the remainder of 1964, the VC launched further attacks on US targets such as the Brinks Hotel and Bien Hoa Air Base, but there were no significant responses from the US military. Card returned to service on 11 December 1964 and remained in service until 1970, when she was placed in the Reserve Fleet.
