= Roy Boehm =

US Navy SEAL (1924–2008)

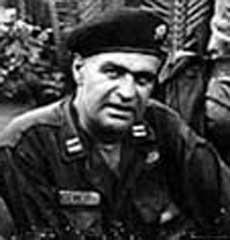
- Roy Boehm as a Captain in Vietnam
- Born: 9 April 1924; Brooklyn, New York, U.S.
- Died: 30 December 2008 (aged 84); Punta Gorda, Florida, U.S.
- Military career
- Allegiance: United States of America
- Branch: United States Navy
- Service years: 1941–1971
- Rank: Lieutenant Commander
- Unit: SEALs
- Commands: UDT-21, Seal Team 2
- Conflicts: World War II: New Guinea campaign; Battle of the Coral Sea; Solomon Islands campaign; Guadalcanal campaign; Battle of Cape Esperance; Battle of the Green Islands; Bougainville campaign; Gilbert and Marshall Islands campaign; Operation Hailstone; Mariana and Palau Islands campaign; Battle of Saipan; Battle of Tinian; Second Battle of Guam; Japan campaign; Volcano and Ryukyu Islands campaign; Battle of Okinawa; Korean War: Battle of Inchon; Battle of Chosin Reservoir; Vietnam War
- Awards: Bronze Star with Valor Device; Purple Heart; Air Medal

Roy H. Boehm (9 April 1924 – 30 December 2008) was a veteran of 30 years of military service in the United States Navy, serving in three wars and various clandestine operations. Boehm was a mustang officer who rose up from the enlisted ranks and was commissioned to develop and lead what would become the US Navy SEALs as the first Officer In Charge of SEAL Team Two.

== Career ==
At the age of 17, Boehm enlisted in the United States Navy in April 1941 to become a diver and saw action in the Pacific theater of operation during World War II from February 1942 until the conclusion of the war in 1945.

His first billet as a hardhat diver was aboard the USS Duncan (DD-485), a newly commissioned Gleaves-class destroyer. The ship entered the wreckage of Pearl Harbor for last minute repairs and refitting before proceeding to the ocean war in the South Pacific. Qualified divers on all vessels entering Pearl Harbor were temporarily assigned to the base to assist in salvage of sunken ships. Boehm was tasked with salvaging the sunken USS Arizona and diving to recover corpses and ammunition. Boehm confessed that he found the job of recovering dead sailors so distressing that he actually vomited inside his diver's helmet the first time he was required to do it.

Boehm was a veteran of one of the largest "all surface" sea engagements of World War II, the Battle of Cape Esperance at Guadalcanal. During the battle, Boehm was serving on the destroyer USS Duncan when the ship received fifty-eight 6″ and 8″ shell hits at point blank range before going down. With shrapnel embedded in his head and body, he saved one of his shipmates from burning to death by plunging into the ocean. Subsequently, he had to literally fight off sharks, which killed the sailor he tried to save.

Boehm participated in the following campaigns and engagements: Battle of the Coral Sea, Bougainville, Truk, Green Island, Emerau, Saipan, Tinian, and Guam. He was engaged in supplying arms and ammunition to the guerrillas in the Philippines and fought the Japanese in Kerama Reto and Okinawa.

After World War II, Boehm left the Navy briefly, but reenlisted after a few months of civilian life. He served as Chief Boatswain's Mate aboard the USS Worcester (CL-144) during the Korean War providing fire support for the Marine Corps landing at Inchon and covering the retreat at the Chosin Reservoir. In 1955 Boehm went through UDT (Underwater Demolition Team) training at the age of 31. Because of his prior experience as a deep-sea diver he had the opportunity to test prototype submersibles and swimmer-delivery vehicles. Eventually he was commissioned as an officer.

After receiving his commission, in early 1960 Boehm developed, designed, implemented, and led the US Navy's commando organization known as the SEALs. He was the first Officer in Charge (OIC) of SEAL Team Two. Boehm personally selected the men for this unit, the first two being Rudy Boesch as master-at-arms and J. H. "Hoot" Andrews as storekeeper.

While forming the SEALs, Boehm was subjected to a Board of Inquiry five times (but never court-martialed) for offenses such as modifying issued gear (high-altitude parachutes and diving rigs) to make them suitable for the SEALs' purposes and for purchasing weapons such as AR-15s on the open market as opposed to going through official channels or the Navy's Bureau of Weapons. The investigations were dropped after he received authorization from President John F. Kennedy following a Kennedy visit to the Little Creek training area to see the SEALs in action.

Boehm's idea for a Naval commando unit went back to his time in the Pacific in World War II. He envisioned highly motivated and highly trained warriors like the Frogmen and UDTs operating beyond the beachhead. He felt that his men should have a variety of training to give them an edge in unconventional warfare beyond diving, shooting, demolitions, martial arts, and parachuting and expanded the curriculum to include photography, intelligence gathering, and sailing. He even sent SEALs to train in prisons to learn skills such as lockpicking, safecracking, and hotwiring cars from professional criminals.

== Service in Vietnam ==
On 4 November 1963, Boehm arrived in South Vietnam to act as an advisor for Army of the Republic of Vietnam Underwater Demolition Teams. Rather than train for the conventional UDT mission Boehm employed his frogmen in the unconventional warfare role conducting recon missions, ambushes and raids against the Viet Cong (VC). He would also aid in the investigation of the successful VC underwater attack on USNS Card, suggesting that the explosives and expertise used may have been provided by a group of deserters from his own unit. Boehm was eventually evacuated on medical grounds in late 1964 with viral hepatitis and a deformed kneecap. As an advisor in Vietnam, Boehm befriended and grew to respect one of his enemies, the commander of the VC 514th Battalion named Minh.

== Post Vietnam Service ==
Boehm assisted in the design and implementation of the Navy's first counterinsurgency course, for which he received the Navy Achievement Medal. Following this, he was named head of the Navy's River Patrol Craft Division where he developed tactical procedures, organized, and trained Patrol Boat, River sailors for Operation Game Warden in Vietnam.

== Death ==
Boehm died 30 December 2008, at his home in Punta Gorda, Florida. He was 84. According to his wife Susan, he wanted his death to go unpublicized. "He wanted no obituary, no funeral service and no fanfare," she said, "He just wanted to go in peace".

On 19 August 2009, President Barack Obama signed Public Law No. 111-59 (H.R. 2470), sponsored by Congressman Tom Rooney, which officially named the Murdock Post Office in Port Charlotte, Florida, located in Charlotte County in which Boehm lived, after him.

To designate the facility of the United States Postal Service located at 19190 Cochran Boulevard FRNT in Port Charlotte, Florida, as the "Lieutenant Commander Roy H. Boehm Post Office Building"

— Public Law No. 111-59, enacted August 19, 2009

== Military awards ==
- Bronze Star with Valor Device
- Purple Heart
- Meritorious Service Medal
- Air Medal
- Navy Achievement Medal
- Presidential Unit Citation (1942)
- Navy Meritorious Unit Commendation (1967)
- Navy Good Conduct Medal with three bronze service stars
- China Service Medal
- American Defense Medal
- American Campaign Medal
- Asiatic Pacific Campaign Medal with one Silver Star, one Bronze Star and Arrowhead device
- World War II Victory Medal
- Navy Occupation Service Medal
- National Defense Service Medal with one Bronze Star
- Korean Service Medal with two Bronze Stars
- Armed Forces Expeditionary Medal
- Vietnam Campaign Medal
- Presidential Unit Citation (Philippines)
- Korean Presidential Unit Citation
- United Nations Medal
- Philippine Liberation Medal
- United Nations Korea Medal
- Vietnam Campaign Medal
- USN Expert Rifle Medal
- USN Expert Pistol Medal

== See also ==
- List of United States Navy SEALs
