= USS Mahopac (ATA-196) =

Tugboat of the United States Navy

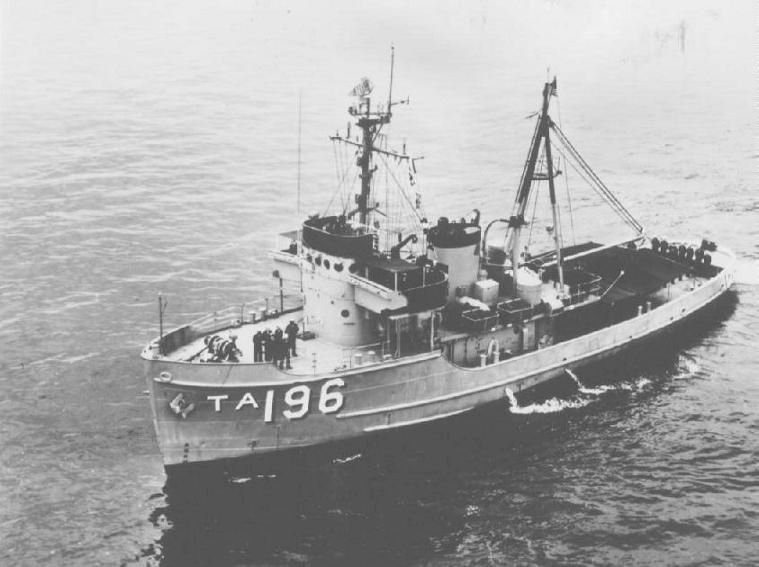
- USS Mahopac (ATA-196)

History

United States
- Name: ATA-196; USS Mahopac (ATA-196) (16 July 1948)
- Namesake: Lake Mahopac
- Builder: Levingston Shipbuilding Co., Orange, TX
- Laid down: 24 November 1944
- Launched: 21 December 1944
- Commissioned: 6 March 1945
- Reclassified: Auxiliary Fleet Tug ATA-196, 15 May 1944
- Stricken: 15 April 1976
- Fate: Sold to Taiwan under the Security Assistance Program (SAP), 1 May 1976

History

Taiwan
- Name: Ta Peng (ATA-549)
- Acquired: 1 May 1976
- Stricken: 1991
- Fate: Expended as missile target, 1993.

General characteristics
- Class & type: Sotoyomo-class fleet tug auxiliary fleet tug
- Displacement: 534 t.(lt) 835 t.(fl)
- Length: 143 ft (44 m)
- Beam: 33 ft (10 m)
- Draft: 13 ft (4.0 m)
- Propulsion: Diesel-electric engines, single screw
- Speed: 13 knots (24 km/h; 15 mph)
- Complement: 45
- Armament: One single 3"/50 dual purpose gun mount and two single 20 mm AA guns.

USS Mahopac (ATA-196) was a U.S. Navy Sotoyomo class auxiliary fleet tug laid down on 24 November 1944 and launched 21 December 1944. She served briefly in the Pacific Theater at the end of World War II, followed by extended assignments in Alaska and Japan. Between 1965 and 1969 she made periodic tours off the coast of Vietnam in support of 7th Fleet operations there during the Vietnam War.

Mahopac was sold to Taiwan in 1976 under the Security Assistance Program (SAP). She was expended as missile target in 1993.

== History ==
The vessel's planned designation was ATR-123, reflecting her intended role as a Rescue Ocean Tug, but was re-designated as Auxiliary Ocean Tug ATA-196 on May 14, 1944, before construction had started. Upon completion of shakedown and underway training, ATA‑196 departed for the Pacific. From May through November 1945 she participated in towing operations in the central and western Pacific. She then proceeded to the north Pacific for towing and search air rescue duties with the Alaskan Sea frontier. While serving in that area, she was named Mahopac 16 July 1948, after Lake Mahopac, New York.

The tug remained under the operational control of the commanding officer, U.S. Naval Station Kodiak Island, Alaska, until May 1957. On 13 May, Mahopac departed Kodiak for Astoria, Oregon, for inactivation. En route she received new orders canceling inactivation and changing her homeport to Yokosuka, Japan, effective 1 July 1957.

Mahopac departed San Francisco for the western Pacific 22 July 1957 with barges in tow. Transferring the barges at Eniwetok atoll 28 August, she continued on to Yokosuka, arriving 7 September. She then performed towing and drone operations for the Fleet Training Group. Through 1964, her duties took her as far as Subic Bay in the Philippines; her 1965 to 1969 assignments extended her cruises to include periodic tours off the coast of Vietnam in support of 7th Fleet operations there. In May 1967, she participated in the rescue of SS Minot Victory which had run aground on a coral reef.

== Fate ==
On 1 May 1976 she was sold to Taiwan under the Security Assistance Program (SAP) and renamed Ta Peng (ATA-549, Chinese: 大鵬). She was expended as missile target in 1993.
