= USS Current =

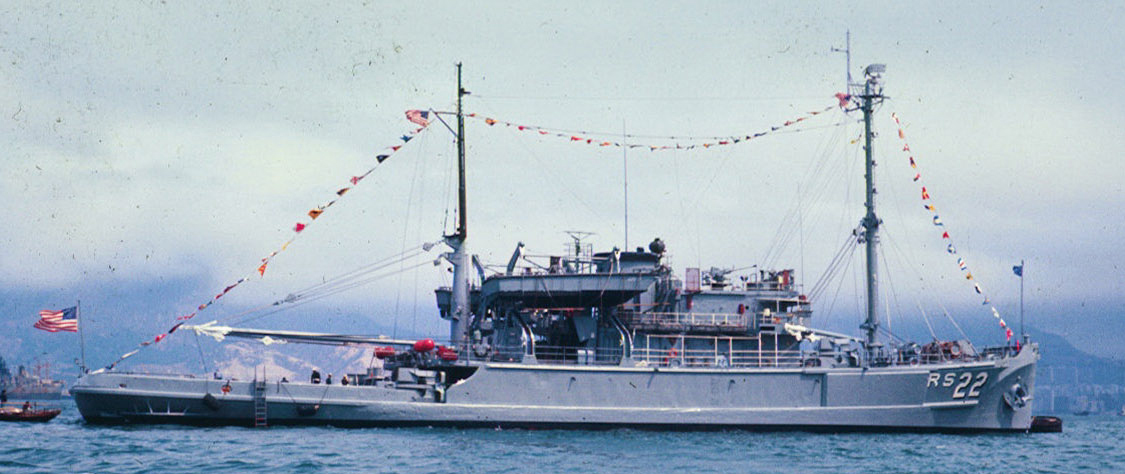

History

United States
- Builder: Basalt Rock Company
- Laid down: 2 April 1943
- Launched: 25 September 1943
- Commissioned: 14 June 1944
- Decommissioned: 9 February 1948
- In service: 10 October 1951
- Out of service: date unknown
- Stricken: 1 June 1973
- Identification: IMO number: 7738838
- Fate: Sold for scrapping, 27 June 1975

General characteristics
- Tonnage: 1,441 tons
- Displacement: 1,630 tons
- Length: 213 ft 6 in (65.07 m)
- Beam: 39 ft (12 m)
- Draught: 14 ft 4 in (4.37 m)
- Propulsion: diesel-electric, twin screws, 2,780 hp
- Speed: 15 knots (28 km/h)
- Complement: 120
- Armament: four 40 mm guns, four 0.5 in (12.7 mm) machine guns

USS Current (ARS-22) was a Diver-class rescue and salvage ship commissioned by the U.S. Navy during World War II. Her task was to come to the aid of stricken vessels.

Current (ARS-22) was launched 25 September 1943 by Basalt Rock Company in Napa, California; sponsored by Mrs. E. R. Booker; and commissioned 14 June 1944.

== Service history ==
=== World War II service ===
Clearing San Francisco, California, 6 August 1944, Current sailed on towing duty to Ulithi, arriving 14 October. She carried out local towing and salvage operations from this port until 19 May 1945. Among her most important repair operations were the emergency salvage work performed on Houston (CL-81) and Canberra (CA-70) from 19 October to 14 December 1944, and the valiant fire fighting on Randolph (CV-15) 11 March 1945.

After replenishing in San Pedro Bay, Leyte, Current arrived off Okinawa 2 June 1945 for salvage operations aiding the many ships damaged by Japanese air attack, and those sailing in the U.S. 3rd Fleet and the U.S. 5th Fleet raids on the Japanese homeland. She served ships of the occupation forces at Okinawa until 5 January 1946 when she sailed by way of Sasebo, Japan to San Francisco, arriving 27 February.

=== Atomic testing ===
Between 15 April 1946 and 22 July 1947 Current served with JTF-1 on Operation Crossroads, the atomic weapons tests in the Marshall Islands. She returned to San Diego, California, 23 August 1947 and was placed out of commission in reserve 9 February 1948.

=== Korean War ===
Recommissioned 10 October 1951, Current sailed from Long Beach, California 7 December and arrived at Pearl Harbor a week later. Following a 1952 tour of duty in the Far East during the Korean War, she carried out an extensive salvage operation on the merchant ship Quartette off Midway Island, saving approximately 2,000 tons of grain between 23 December 1952 and 6 March 1953. During her 1953 tour of duty off Korea, Current refloated the stranded LST-578 at Cheju and in a lengthy and difficult operation salvaged the stern half of SS Cornhusker Mariner which had gone aground off Pusan. Her next Far Eastern tour in 1954 and 1955 included duty with the Taiwan Patrol, visits to Japanese ports, and participation in the Operation Passage to Freedom evacuation of refugees from North Vietnam.

After alterations to fit her for duty in the Arctic, Current arrived at Seattle, Washington, 25 June 1955. She carried construction equipment and materials into the poorly charted waters along the northern coast of Canada and Alaska from 15 July to 30 September, when she returned to Pearl Harbor for repairs. She voyaged to Kwajalein to inspect the work on mooring buoys between 16 January and 22 February 1956, then arrived in Seattle 29 June to join a convoy carrying supplies to stations of the Distant Early Warning line from 15 July to 10 September, returning to Pearl Harbor for local operations.

During her 1957 deployment to the Western Pacific, Current took part in a mine recovery training exercise in the Marianas; surveyed and blasted a channel in Scarborough Shoal in the South China Sea; salvaged aircraft and vessels off Japan; and performed a mercy mission by treating a Japanese diver stricken with the bends off Honshū. After local operations at Pearl Harbor, she returned to the Far East to operate with destroyers off Japan and with the U.S. 7th Fleet in the Taiwan Straits from October 1957 to February 1958.

From July to December 1958 Current operated on diving training duty at Pusan, Korea and salvaged several vessels and aircraft in Japanese waters. In March and April 1959, she carried passengers to Samoa where her divers worked on a sunken hulk, and in November returned to the Far East for duty until March 1960, when she put back to Pearl Harbor for duty in the Hawaiian group for the remainder of the year. In 1965 she assisted in Operation Sailor Hat with the moorings of target ships. May 1967 the rescued the SS Minot Victory.

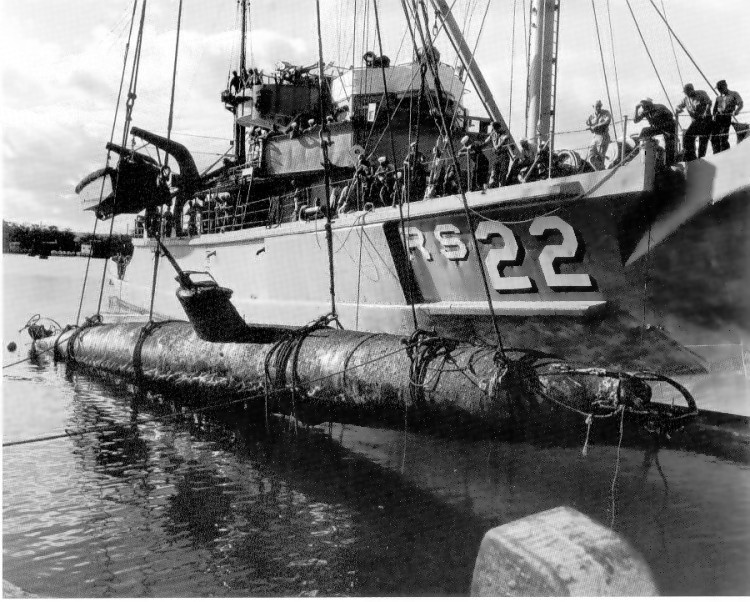
Raising of a midget sub from Keehi Lagoon by USS Current in 1960

Current was decommissioned 28 April 1972 and struck from the Naval Register, 1 June 1973. Final Disposition: she was sold for scrapping, 27 June 1975, by the Defense Reutilization and Marketing Service, for $78,000 to Valor Navigation Co., New York, New York.

== Military awards and honors ==
USS Current was awarded two battle stars for World War II service, three battle stars for Korean War service, and six campaign stars for Vietnam War service.
