= USS Conserver =

United States Navy rescue and salvage ship

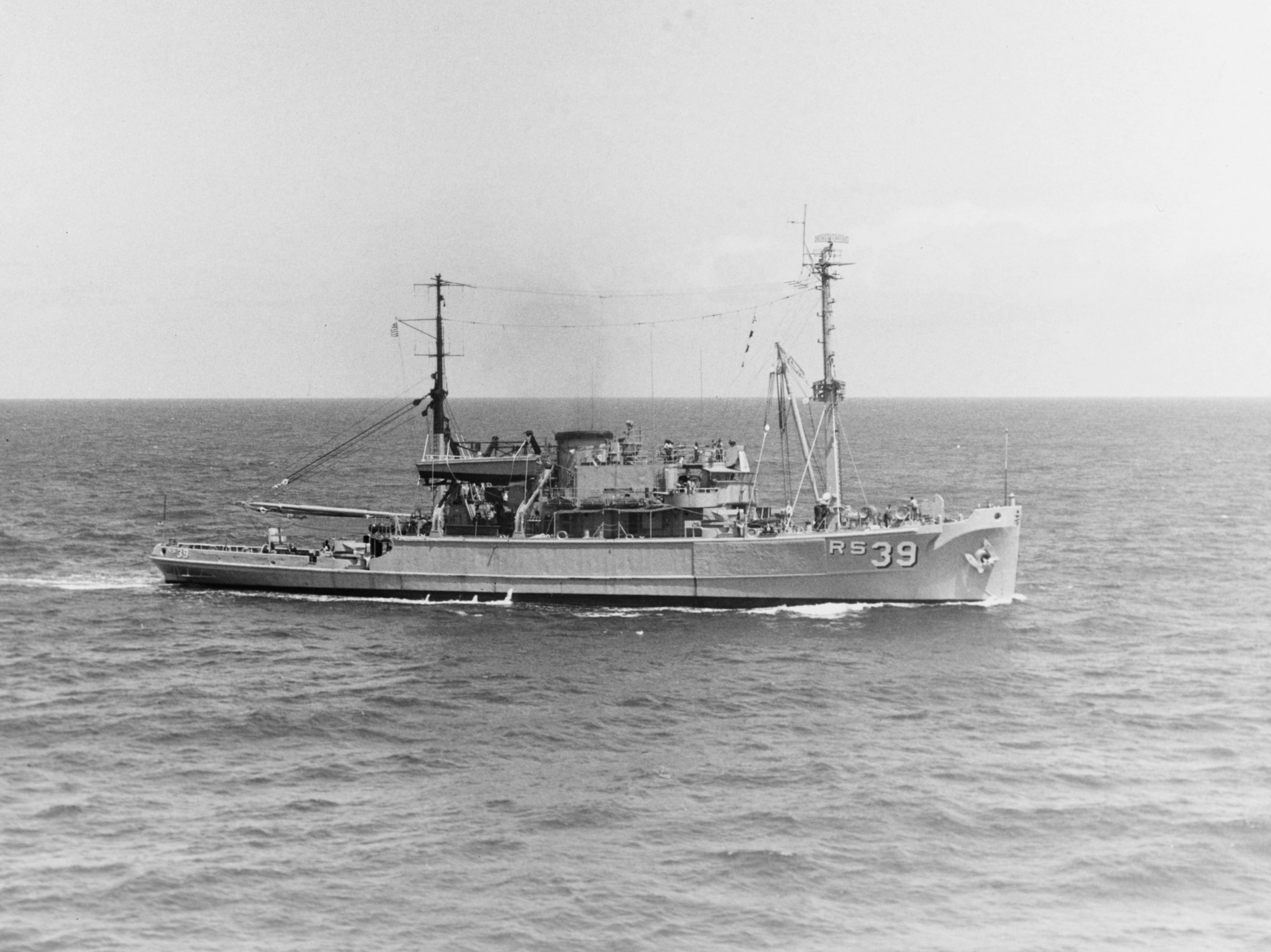
- USS Conserver (ARS-39) Off Oahu, Hawaii, 26 April 1967

History

United States
- Name: USS Conserver
- Namesake: One who preserves or keeps in a safe and sound state.
- Builder: Basalt Rock Company
- Laid down: 10 August 1944
- Launched: 27 January 1945
- Commissioned: 9 June 1945
- Decommissioned: 1 April 1994
- Stricken: 1 April 1994
- Home port: Bishop Point, Pearl Harbor HI
- Motto: Doing time on 39
- Nickname(s): The fighting "C". (Crew was known to start fights for any reason) Always Ready Ship.
- Fate: Sunk as a SINKEX target on or about 13 November 2004 in the Hawaii area.

General characteristics
- Class & type: Bolster-class rescue and salvage ship
- Tonnage: 1,441 Tons
- Displacement: 1,497 long tons (1,521 t) (lt), 2,048 long tons (2,081 t) (fl)
- Length: 213 ft 6 in (65.07 m)
- Beam: 39 ft (12 m)
- Propulsion: diesel-electric, twin screws, 2,780 hp.
- Speed: 15 knots (28 km/h)
- Complement: 100
- Armament: two 40 mm guns

USS Conserver (ARS-39) was a Bolster-class rescue and salvage ship acquired by the U.S. Navy during World War II. Her task was to come to the aid of stricken vessels.

Conserver was launched 27 January 1945 by Basalt Rock Company in Napa, California; sponsored by Mrs. H. Price; and commissioned 9 June 1945 at South Vallejo, California.

== End-of-World War II operations ==
Conserver arrived at Sasebo, Japan, 21 September 1945, and until 3 March 1946, she carried out salvage operations at Sasebo, Okinawa, Yokosuka, Aomori, and Hakodate in support of the occupation.

== Participation in nuclear testing ==
After preparations at Pearl Harbor, Conserver arrived at Bikini Atoll 29 March. She served in the Marshall Islands, aiding in Operation Crossroads, the atomic weapons tests of 1946, until 2 September 1947, when she arrived at Manila for duty in the Philippines. From 9 April 1948 to 26 September, she served in Hawaiian waters, and then in Alaskan waters, returning to Pearl Harbor 13 January 1949.

== Korean War era operations ==
From Pearl Harbor, Conserver returned to operate off Alaska between 14 April 1949 and 7 June, and from 10 December to 25 March 1950. With the outbreak of the Korean War, she arrived at Yokosuka 15 July, and between 15 July and 1 August carried out salvage and diving assignments in Korean waters. After a brief overhaul at Yokosuka, she salvaged a fuel pipeline at Iwo Jima, and from 10 September until 24 December returned to Korean waters.

After a final towing voyage from Japan to Korea in January 1951, Conserver returned to local operations at Pearl Harbor from 16 February to 28 May. After salvage duty at Kwajalein and Majuro, she returned to Pearl Harbor to prepare for her second tour of duty in the Korean War. She arrived at Sasebo 27 September, and operated primarily in Korean waters until 7 May 1952, when she cleared for San Diego, California.

After operating on the U.S. West Coast until 4 August 1952, Conserver sailed for brief duty at Pearl Harbor, Kwajalein, Guam, Subic Bay, Bangkok, Singapore, and Sangley Point, returning to Pearl Harbor 22 October. On 6 April 1953, she returned to Sasebo for duty in Korean waters until 9 November, when she cleared for Pearl Harbor.

== Post-Korean War activity ==
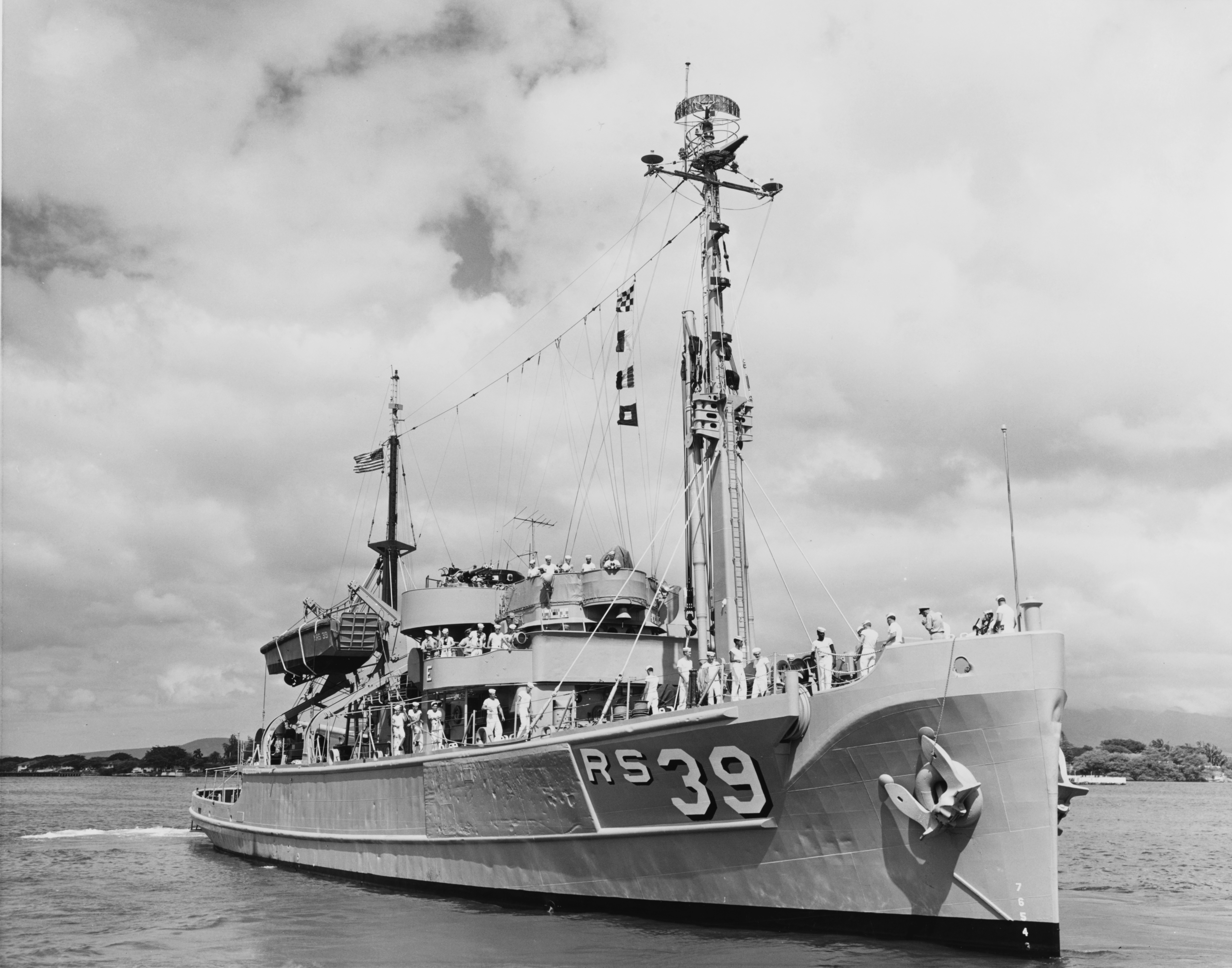

From the close of the Korean war through 1960, Conserver alternated operations in the Hawaiian Islands with occasional towing and salvage duty in Pacific islands and tours of duty in the Far East in 1954, 1955, 1955–56, 1957, 1958–59, 1959, and 1960.

Between 20 September 1958 and 20 October, she gave salvage and towing service off Taiwan as American ships stood by during the Quemoy Crisis.

The Conserver participated in Operation Dominic between 25 April - 11 July 11, 1962 as a part of West Pac which involved nuclear testing near Christmas Island.

The Conserver also saw duty as part of Task Force 71 of the US Seventh Fleet in search of Korean Air Lines Flight 007 shot down by the Soviets off Sakhalin Island on 1 Sept. 1983.

LCDR Joseph Sensi jr. served as commanding officer for her last two years of service.

Former Florida State Senator Richard Renick and comedian Ron White served on Conserver during their naval service.

== Decommissioning ==
Conserver was decommissioned twice. Her first decommissioning occurred on 30 September 1986. She was re-commissioned one year later on 30 September 1987. Her final decommissioning took place on 1 April 1994. She was struck from the Naval Register 1 April 1994 and laid up in the Inactive Ship Maintenance Facility, Pearl Harbor, Hawaii. Final Disposition, Conserver was sunk as a SINKEX target on or about 13 November 2004 in the Hawaii area.

== Chronology ==
Date	Deployment/Event
10 AUG 1944	Keel Laid
27 JAN 1945	Launch Date
9 JUN 1945	Commissioned
12 SEPT 1945 - 21 FEB 1946	US Navy occupation of Japan.
21 SEPT 1946 - 3 MAR 1946	Salvage operations at Sasebo, Okinawa, Yokosuka, Aomori, and Hakodate during American occupation of Japan.
29 MAR 1946 -2 SEPT 1947	Served in Operation Crossroads in the Marshall Islands at Bikini Atoll.
9 APR 1948 - 26 SEPT 1948	Served in Hawaiian and Alaskan Waters
14 APR 1949 - 7 JUN 1949	Operated in Alaskan Waters
10 DEC 1949 - 25 MAR 1950	Operated in Alaskan Waters
15 JULY 1950 - 1 AUG 1950	Salvage Operations Yokosuka, Japan and Korea
10 SEPT 1950 -24 DEC 1950	Operated in Korean Waters
15 SEPT 1950 - 17 SEPT 1950	Ichon landing during the Battle of Inchon.
JAN 1951	Towing voyage from Japan to Korea
16 FEB 1951 - 28 MAY 1952	Operated near Sasebo, Korea
5 AUG 1952 - 22 OCT 1952	Operated near Pearl Harbor, Kwajalein, Guam, Subic Bay, Bangkok, Singapore, and Sangley Point.
6 APR 1953 - 9 NOV 1953	Operated near Sasebo, Korea
AUG 1957 - DEC 1957	West Pac
20 SEPT 1958 - 20 OCT 1958	Operated tow service during the Quemoy Crisis
JAN 1960 - JUN 1962	West Pac
25 APR 1962 - 11 JULY 1962	As a part of West Pac participated in Operation Dominic Nuclear Testing.
24 JUL 1965 – 26 AUG 1965	Salvage of the USS Frank Knox DDR-742 at Practice Reef near Hong Kong
JUN 1966 - OCT 1966	West Pac-Vietnam
23 NOV 1966 - 31 JAN 1967	Vietnamese Counter Offensive: Phase II
SEP 1967 - NOV 1967	West Pac-Vietnam
27 MAR 1968 - 1 APR 1968	Tet Counter Offensive
2 APR 1968 - 30 JUN1968	Vietnamese Counter Offensive: Phase IV
1 JUL 1969 - 11 JUL 1969	Vietnamese Counter Offensive: Phase V
3 AUG 1969 - 10 OCT 1969	Vietnam Summer-Fall 1969
SEP 1970 - MAR 1971	West Pac-Vietnam
23 AUG 1970 - 24 NOV 1970	Vietnamese Counter Offensive: Phase VII
MAY 1972 - OCT (or Nov.) 1972	West Pac-Vietnam
NOV 1973 - MAY 1974	West Pac-Vietnam
1975	West Pac
JUL 1978 - JAN 1979	West Pac
JUL 1979 - JAN 1980	West Pac
SEP 1979 - APR 1980	Dry Dock
25 – 30 NOV 1982	Hurricane Iwa restore power operation at Nawiliwili Harbor, Kauai
SEP 1983 - OCT 1983	Towed Sonar Array Flight KAL 007
FEB 1985 - JUL 1985	West Pac
APR 1986 - JUL 1986	Westpac cruise
SEPT 30, 1986	First Decommissioning
JUNE 22,1987 - SEPT 25, 1987	Teardown/Rebuild
SEPT 30, 1987	Recommissioning
3 MAR 1988	Shellback Initiation - Pacific Ocean
MAR 1988 - APR 1988	Golden Shellback Ceremony
MAY 1991 - JUL 1991	Panama Canal
1 APR 1994	Decommissioned and Struck from Naval Register
13 NOV 2004	Sunk as a SINKEX target

=== Operation Dominic Chronology ===
Date/Time	Nuclear Bomb
25 APR 1962 0646	ADOBIE
27 APR 1962 0702	AZTEC
2 MAY 1962 0920	ARKANSAS
4 MAY 1962 1005	QUESTA
9 MAY 1962 0901	QUESTA
8 MAY 1962 0901	YUKON
9 MAY 1962 0801	MESILLA
11 MAY 1962 0637	MUSKEGON
12 MAY 1962 0803	ENCINO
14 MAY 1962 0622	SWANEE
19 MAY 1962 0637	CHETCO
30 JUNE 1962 0637	BLUESTONE
8 JULY 1962 2300	STARFISH
10 JULY 1962 0732	SUNSET
11 JULY 1962 0637	PAMLICO

== Military awards and honors ==
USS Conserver was assigned to Occupation and China service in the Far East:

MEDAL/ACTION	DATES
Navy Occupation Service Medal:	12 September 1945 to 21 February 1946
China Service Medal (extended):	2 to 5 April 1956

Conserver received nine battle stars for Korean War service:

MEDAL/ACTION	DATES
North Korean Aggression:	18 to 29 July 1950, 18 September to 2 November 1950
Communist China Aggression:	3 to 13 November 1950, 25 November 1950
Inchon Landing:	15 to 17 September 1950
First UN Counter Offensive:	25 to 28 January 1951
UN Summer-Fall Offensive:	30 October to 12 November 1951
Second Korean Winter:	19 December 1951 to 6 January 1952, 2 February to 2 March 1952, 14 March 1952, 18 March 1952, 12 to 30 April 1952.
Third Korean Winter:	8 to 30 April 1953
Korea, Summer-Fall 1953:	1 to 2 May 1953, 10 to 27 July 1953

She received the following campaign stars for the Vietnam War:

MEDAL/ACTION	DATES
Vietnamese Counteroffensive - Phase II:	23 November to 16 December 1966, 25 to 31 January 1967
Tet Counteroffensive:	27 March to 1 April 1968
Vietnamese Counteroffensive - Phase IV:	2 to 15 April 1968, 14 May to 7 June 1968, 10 to 30 June 1968
Vietnamese Counteroffensive - Phase V:	1 to 11 July 1969
Vietnam Summer-Fall 1969:	3 to 14 August 1969, 20 August to 10 October 1969
Vietnamese Counteroffensive - Phase VII:	23 August to 8 September 1970, 16 September to 13 October 1970, 26 October to 9 November 1970, 18 to 24 November 1970

Her crew was eligible for the following medals, ribbons, and commendations:

- Secretary of the Navy Letter of Commendation
- Navy Meritorious Unit Commendation
- Navy Battle "E" Ribbon (4)
- China Service Medal
- American Campaign Medal
- Asiatic-Pacific Campaign Medal
- World War II Victory Medal
- Navy Occupation Service Medal (with Asia clasp)
- National Defense Service Medal (2)
- Korean Service Medal (8)
- Armed Forces Expeditionary Medal (Taiwan Straits)
- Vietnam Service Medal (6)
- Sea Service Deployment Ribbon
- Republic of Vietnam Gallantry Cross Unit Citation
- United Nations Service Medal
- Republic of Vietnam Campaign Medal
- Republic of Korea War Service Medal (retroactive)

== Health Effects ==
Asbestos was used in the construction of the USS Conserver. Those who served aboard her before her 1986-1987 overhaul and recommissioning may have been exposed to asbestos, mercury, and trichloroethylene. Sailors who participated in Operation Crossroads or Operation Dominic while aboard the Conserver may have been exposed to radiation related to nuclear bomb testing.
