= USS Mataco =

Tugboat of the United States Navy

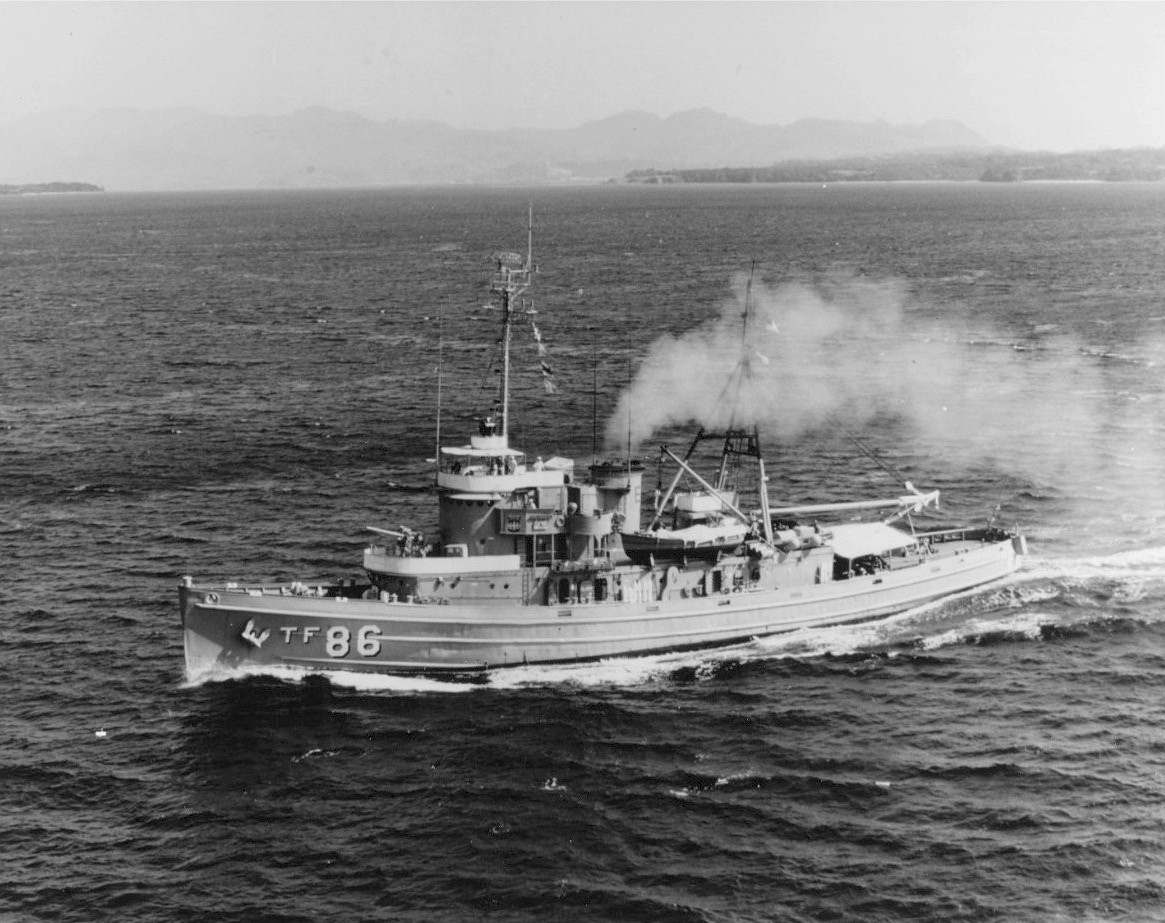
- Mataco underway in Subic Bay, Philippines, 3 November 1969

History

United States
- Name: USS Mataco (AT-86)
- Builder: United Engineering Co., San Francisco, California
- Laid down: 27 June 1942
- Launched: 14 October 1942
- Commissioned: 29 May 1943
- Decommissioned: 1 October 1977
- Reclassified: ATF-86, 15 May 1944
- Stricken: 1 October 1979
- Honors and awards: 5 battle stars (World War II); 4 battle stars (Korea); 7 campaign stars (Vietnam)
- Fate: Sold for scrapping, 1 April 1979

General characteristics
- Class & type: Navajo-class fleet tug
- Displacement: 1,235 long tons (1,255 t)
- Length: 205 ft (62 m)
- Beam: 38 ft 6 in (11.73 m)
- Draft: 15 ft 4 in (4.67 m)
- Propulsion: Diesel-electric; 4 × General Motors 12-278A diesel main engines driving 4 × General Electric generators and 3 × General Motors 3-268A auxiliary services engines; single screw; 3,600 shp (2,685 kW)
- Speed: 16 knots (30 km/h; 18 mph)
- Complement: 85
- Armament: 1 × single 3"/50 caliber gun; 2 × twin 40 mm AA guns; 2 × single 20 mm AA guns

USS Mataco (AT-86/ATF-86) was a Navajo-class fleet tug constructed for the United States Navy during World War II. Her purpose was to aid ships, usually by towing, on the high seas or in combat or post-combat areas, plus "other duties as assigned." She served in the Pacific Ocean and was awarded five battle stars for World War II, four battle stars for the Korean War, and seven campaign stars for Vietnam War service.

Mataco was laid down on 27 June 1942 by United Engineering Co., San Francisco, California; launched on 14 October 1942, sponsored by Miss Evelyn B. Piper; and commissioned on 29 May 1943.

== World War II Pacific Theatre operations ==
Following shakedown off San Diego, California, Mataco early proved her endurance when she towed a floating drydock 43 days nonstop from San Francisco to Brisbane, Australia, arriving on 1 October 1943. This passage accounted for 6,800 of 55,000 miles steamed her first year.

== Salvage in combat areas ==
Mataco underwent her first air attack in the Ellice Islands on 17 November, and three days later stood by to aid ships invading the Gilberts. Training and target towing in Hawaiian waters preceded her joining task force TF 53 for the invasion of the Marshalls. She stood off Kwajalein on 31 January 1944 to screen transports, free beached landing craft, and send her divers to recover documents from sunken Japanese ships. Mataco was redesignated ATF-86 on 15 May. She carried out escort and towing missions in the Marshalls and to the Gilberts, Marianas, and Pearl Harbor until 3 December, when Ulithi became her base for the next six months.

== Missed by a torpedo ==
In January 1945 she carried out a major salvage assignment at Leyte, in February she made a tow to Saipan and Guam, and in April she joined the assault on Okinawa. There on 2 April an aerial torpedo passed harmlessly beneath her keel.

== End-of-war operations ==
Mataco pitched in on the enormous amount of salvage work to be done around Okinawa, and at the war's end began tows to Japan. She returned home as she had come to war, towing a drydock from Guam via Pearl Harbor to San Francisco, California, where she moored 25 July. Five months later, on 19 December, she returned to the western Pacific on the first of the annual deployments to the U.S. 7th Fleet which alternated with U.S. West Coast and Alaskan duty.

== Korean War service ==
She was in the Philippines at the outbreak of the Korean War in 1950, and after investigating smuggling in the Ryūkyūs, sailed to Korea, where she performed combat salvage and air sea rescue missions beginning with the 15 September Inchon landings. In mid-October she rounded the peninsula, extending those services to Wonsan. Target towing missions in Japan and between Guam and Pearl Harbor completed this tour, and she arrived in San Diego, California, 12 August 1951.

Mataco began her next western Pacific deployment on 10 January 1952 and during the next 14 months supported United Nations forces in Korea, in October twice rendering fire support at Pippa Kotsu.

The next year she reported for three continuous years of Far Eastern service, and from 1956 to 1966, made five additional U.S. 7th Fleet cruises as well as serving in Alaskan waters for four extended periods.

== Vietnam War operations ==
On 29 February 1967 she began a tour which brought her for the first time to the coast of embattled Vietnam. On 21 April Mataco brought YFR-890 in tow to Vũng Tàu, and in May took up fishing trawler surveillance on Yankee Station. After towing a damaged LST from Da Nang to Guam in July, she trained Korean navy men in salvage in Chinhae, then returned San Diego on 6 November.

In March 1968 the Mataco began her second West-Pac tour towing the YD-91 floating crane to Guam. On to Subic and pick up a floating hospital barge to tow to Danang. Then on to Yankee Station to provide specialized electronic cover with the 7th Fleet. An at sea mishap caused the loss of radar capabilities and shortened the time on station. After repairs, Mataco went into the upper reaches of the Saigon River in the vicinity of Nhà Bè to tow the mined SS Cuba Victory to Yokosuka, Japan.

Operating from Yokosuka she participated in the rescue of the USS Asheville and SS Plymouth Victory. She was also on standby to act as the rescue tug for the captured USS Pueblo, had the decision been made to recapture the spy ship. When the stand-by duty was competed, trailing two tows she sailed back to Da Nang and Nhà Bè. After delivering them she headed for Sattahip Thailand. She provided for launch and retrieve and savage services for the Royal Thai Navy. The crew offered up the new designation: CV-AFT-86.

In 1967 and 1968, the Mataco earned the Commander's Service Force, U.S. Pacific Fleet Battle Efficiency "E." May 1967 she rescued the SS Minot Victory.

When she arrived back in San Diego on 3 Oct, 1968, the '68 West-Pac had covered 26,200 miles.

The tug remained an active unit of the Pacific Fleet into 1969.

== Awards ==
Mataco received five battle stars for World War II:

- Gilbert Islands operation, November 1943
- Marshall Islands operation, Occupation of Kwajalein and Majuro Atolls, January 1944
- Marianas operation, June 1944
- Leyte operation, January 1945
- Okinawa Gunto operation, Assault and occupation of Okinawa Gunto, April 1945

Four battle stars were awarded during the Korean War:

- North Korean Aggression, 18 September to 2 November 1950
- Inchon Landing, 13 to 17 September 1950
- Communist China Aggression, 3 to 28 November 1950
- Korean Defense Summer-Fall 1952, 14 September 1952, 28 September to 16 October 1952

She received seven campaign stars for her participation in the Vietnam War:

- Vietnamese Counteroffensive - Phase II, 19 to 22 April 1967, 5 to 31 May 1967
- Vietnamese Counteroffensive - Phase III, 1 to 12 June 1967, 5 to 10 July 1967
- Vietnamese Counteroffensive - Phase IV, 18 to 30 May 1968, 7 to 11 June 1968
- Vietnamese Counteroffensive - Phase V, 10 to 31 August 1968
- Vietnam Summer-Fall 1969, 13 to 21 October 1969
- Vietnam Winter-Spring 1970, 1 to 5 January 1970, 28 January to 1 February 1970
- Consolidation II, 9 to 11 December 1971, 18 to 23 December 1971
