= Bolster-class rescue and salvage ship =

Class of rescue and salvage ships

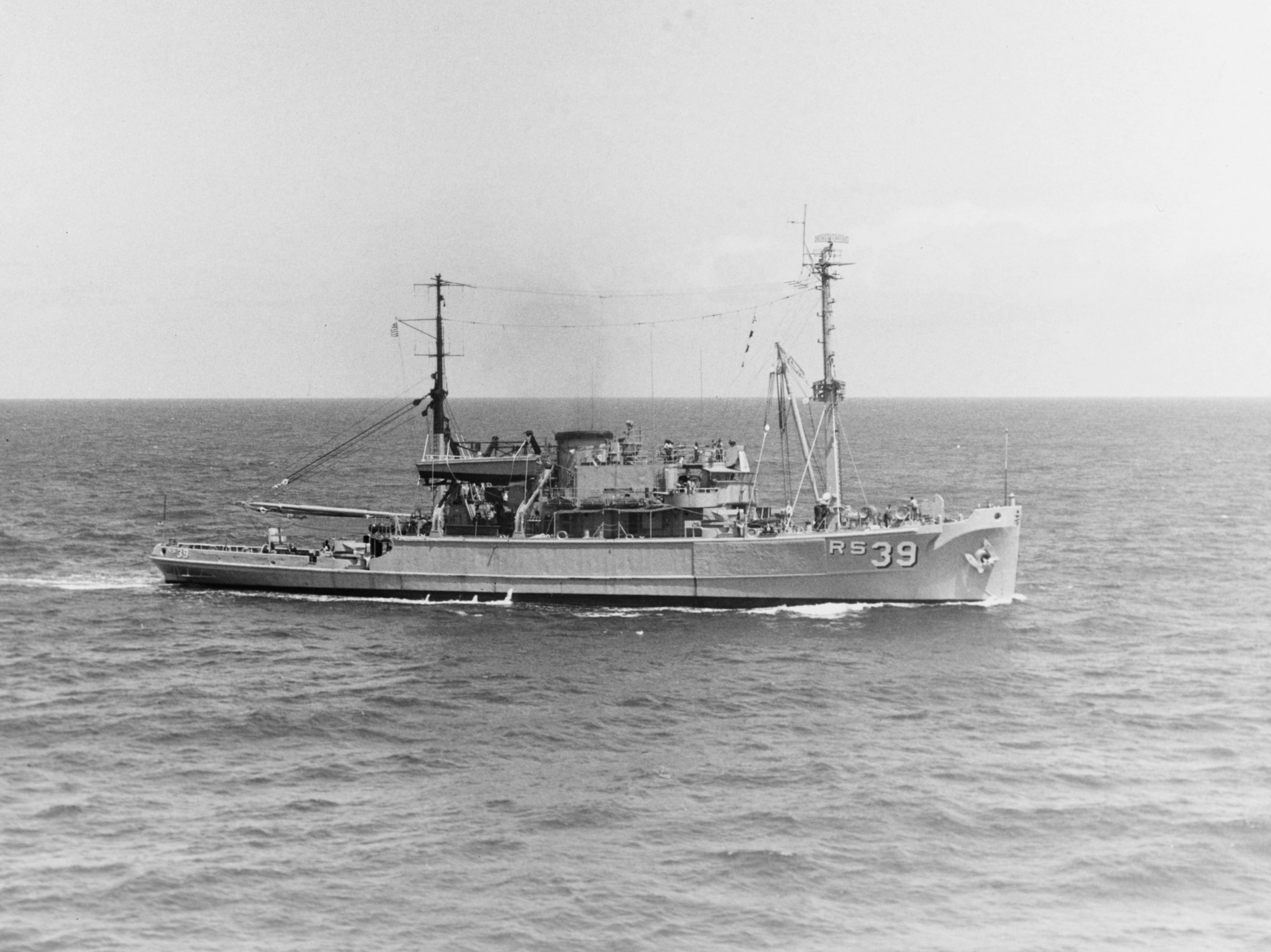
- USS Conserver (ARS-39) off Oahu, Hawaii, 26 April 1967

Class overview
- Builders: Basalt Rock Company
- Operators: United States Navy; Republic of China Navy
- Preceded by: Diver class
- Succeeded by: Safeguard class
- Built: 1944–1946
- In commission: 1944–present
- Planned: 12
- Completed: 6
- Canceled: 6
- Active: 1
- Retired: 5

General characteristics
- Type: Rescue and salvage ship
- Displacement: 1,497 long tons (1,521 t) (lt); 2,048 long tons (2,081 t) (fl)
- Length: 213 ft 6 in (65.07 m)
- Beam: 39 ft (12 m)
- Propulsion: diesel-electric, twin screws, 2,780 hp (2,070 kW)
- Speed: 15 knots (28 km/h; 17 mph)
- Complement: 100
- Armament: 2 × 40 mm guns

The Bolster class were a series of rescue and salvage ships designed and built for the United States Navy during World War II. Rescue and salvage ships such as the Bolster class save battle-damaged combat ships from further damage and tow them to safety. Rescue, salvage and towing ships provide rapid fire fighting, pumping, battle damage repair and rescue towing to warships in combat and tow them to repair ships or bases in safe areas.

== History ==
The Basalt Rock Company's Steel Division built all six of the vessels in the Bolster class. The company (located south of Napa, California, on the Napa River) originally began in 1920 as a rock quarry operation, but by 1938 began constructing its own barges.

On 24 October 1941, the U.S. Congress passed legislation establishing the Naval Salvage Service. Following the Attack on Pearl Harbor, this allowed the navy to begin salvage operations through a contract with Merritt-Chapman & Scott on 11 December 1941. It also allowed the U.S. Navy to have Merritt-Chapman & Scott train future naval salvage operators. A salvage crew's main job was to augment damage control beyond the capacity of a ship's crew. This could include fire fighting, towing ships to repair facilities, or clearing harbors of vessels damaged or scuttled in combat.

It was far faster to repair a damaged vessel than to construct a new one. During the island-hopping campaigns of the Pacific, salvage crews removed landing craft from beaches, clearing beach heads to become staging areas for continuing operations. Many damaged craft and their cargoes were retained and repaired, then used in future operations.

The U.S. Navy Bureau of Construction designed the Bolster-class salvage ships, along with naval officers and the salvage industry, ordering the new class during World War II. These were sturdy, oceangoing tugs equipped with diesel-electric propulsion units and strong, auto-tensioned towing winches. Modeled closely on the Diver salvage-ship design, the Bolster class had a 5 ft (1.5 m) wider beam for increased stability and equipment.

== Ships ==
| Ship name | Hull number | Commissioned | Decommissioned | Fate |
|---|---|---|---|---|
| Bolster | ARS-38 | 1 May 1945 | 24 September 1994 | Sold for scrap, 12 April 2011 |
| Conserver | ARS-39 | 9 June 1945 | 1 April 1994 | Sunk as a target, November 2004 |
| Hoist | ARS-40 | 21 July 1945 | 30 September 1994 | Sold for scrap, 17 July 2007 |
| Opportune | ARS-41 | 5 October 1945 | 30 April 1993 | Sold for scrap, 5 December 2003 |
| Reclaimer | ARS-42 | 20 December 1945 | 16 September 1994 | Sold for scrap, 12 April 2011 |
| Recovery | ARS-43 | 15 May 1946 | 20 September 1994 | Transferred to Taiwan, 30 September 1998; currently active |
| Retriever | ARS-44 | never | never | Construction cancelled, 13 August 1945 |
| Skillful | ARS-45 | never | never | Construction cancelled, 27 August 1945 |
| Support | ARS-46 | never | never | Construction cancelled, 12 August 1945 |
| Toiler | ARS-47 | never | never | Contract cancelled, 12 August 1945 |
| Urgent | ARS-48 | never | never | Contract cancelled, 12 August 1945 |
| Willing | ARS-49 | never | never | Contract cancelled, 12 August 1945 |

(Note:)

== Operations ==
Crew size was about 120 men including the complement of divers, made complete with some unique features found on board. Two fire monitors, capable of pumping out 4,000 US gallons (15,000 L; 3,300 imp gal) of water per minute onto a flaming deck, aided in rescue efforts. A full machine shop allowed patches to be cut and assembled, repairing damaged hulls long enough to return to port for any major repairs. The forward boom could lift up to 20 tons while the one aft, on the fantail, had a maximum lift of 8 tons. Also on the fantail was the Almon Johnson Towing machine which held 2,100 feet (640 m) of 2-inch (51 mm) wire rope capable of a maximum pull of 50 tons.

Further, in her salvage holds was an extensive inventory of portable salvage equipment- pumps, generators, and welding machines of various sizes that could be placed wherever needed. Plus, eight complete legs of beach gear, each capable of generating up to 60 tons of pulling power, were maintained on board. The ships could lift up to 150 tons off the bottom of the ocean with its main bow rollers and an additional 30 tons on its auxiliary bow rollers. A recompression chamber was available for treating diving related sicknesses and the MK-5 Surface Supplied Diving System was in use.

The ship's crew also had the ability to make minor repairs to Bolster-class ships themselves while underway. A small DC electric shop complete with a welder was located on the main deck, while a larger machine-and-electrical shop that could replicate parts and conduct repairs was on the second deck. The crew could fabricate minor parts using onboard machines, including a drill press, grinder, and lathe. Crewmembers also had access to onboard equipment to patch salvage vessels, but shipyards generally performed the larger and more complex repairs that superseded the crew's ability.

== Navigation ==
Navigation of the ship took place on the bridge, and the electronics were updated throughout the vessels' service life. The bridge contained a compass, engine-order telegraph, gyro repeater, and helm. Behind the bridge on the starboard side was the chartroom while the radar room with a fathometer was on the port side. In the aft section of the bridge deck were communications rooms that received and sent communiqués. The gyro room was on the first platform beneath the navigation bridge

== Armament ==
During World War II, the U.S. Navy equipped the Bolster class with defensive armament and safety equipment. The Bolster class' 40-millimeter (1.57 in) gun was primarily used as a defensive weapon against aircraft and small ships. After the war, the navy switched the ship's armament to two 20-millimeter (0.79 in) guns and two 50-caliber machine guns. Eventually, the Bolster class only carried the 50-caliber guns. In case of sinking, there were two 35 ft (11 m) craft in cradles and seven rubber lifeboats available off the navigation bridge.
