= SS Minot Victory =

Victory ship of the United States

- Typical Victory ship

History

United States
- Name: SS Minot Victory
- Owner: War Shipping Administration
- Operator: Isbrandtsen Line
- Builder: Oregon Shipbuilding Company
- Laid down: October 27, 1944
- Launched: December 4, 1944
- Completed: February 1, 1945
- Identification: IMO number: 5236379
- Fate: Scrapped 1985

General characteristics
- Class & type: VC2-S-AP3 Victory ship
- Tonnage: 7612 GRT, 4,553 NRT
- Displacement: 15,200 tons
- Length: 455 ft (139 m)
- Beam: 62 ft (19 m)
- Draft: 28 ft (8.5 m)
- Installed power: 8,500 shp (6,300 kW)
- Propulsion: HP & LP turbines geared to a single 20.5-foot (6.2 m) propeller
- Speed: 16.5 knots
- Boats & landing craft carried: 4 Lifeboats
- Complement: 62 Merchant Marine and 28 US Naval Armed Guards
- Armament: 1 × 5 inch (127 mm)/38 caliber gun; 1 × 3 inch (76 mm)/50 caliber gun; 8 × 20 mm Oerlikon

The SS Minot Victory was a Victory ship built during World War II under the Emergency Shipbuilding program. She was laid down and launched by the Oregon Shipbuilding Corporation, and completed on February 1, 1945. The ship's United States Maritime Commission designation was VC2-S-AP3 and hull number 149 (1203). The Maritime Commission turned it over for merchant navy operation to a civilian contractor, the Isthmian Steamship Company under the United States Merchant Marine act for the War Shipping Administration. She was named after Minot, Maine and Minot, North Dakota.

Victory ships were designed to supersede the earlier Liberty ships. Unlike Liberty ships, Victory ships were designed to serve the US Navy after the war and to last longer. Compared to Liberty ships, Victory ships were faster, longer, wider, taller, and had a thinner stack which was set further forward on the superstructure. They also had a long, raised forecastle.

== World War II ==
For World War II the Minot Victory was operated by Isbrandtsen Line, and had United States Navy Armed Guard to man the deck guns. The Minot Victory arrived at Okinawa on April 11, 1945, in a fleet of 15 merchant ships serving in the Pacific War. The ship was a supplier for operations in the Battle of Okinawa lasting from the April 1 until June 22, 1945. On April 12, 1945, at 2:55 pm while anchored at Hagushi, the fleet came under attack, the Minot Victory shot down a Japanese plane which had strafed her. The Kamikaze plane nevertheless crashed into her number 4 king post mast, all told wounding five of the crew on board. At the time she had a 57-man merchant crew, consisting of 27 USN Armed Guard sailors and 9 civilians. She was then repaired and put back in service shortly. Minot Victory's international radio call letters were A N G P. In 1948 she was laid up in the National Defense Reserve Fleet, first at Wilmington, North Carolina and later transferred to Beaumont, Texas.

== Korean War ==
In 1950 she was reactivated for the Korean War. She made eight trips to Korea between March 1951 and March 1952 and helped the American forces engage against Communist aggression in South Korea. About 75 percent of the personnel taken to Korea for the Korean War came by the merchant marine ships, but the Minot Victory primarily transported goods, mail, food and other supplies. About 90% of the supplies brought to the war zone were carried by merchant marine ships. In 1952 after the war she was laid up in the reserve fleet.

== Vietnam War ==
Minot Victory carried goods and ammunition to support the Vietnam War as well. In May 1967 she ran aground on a coral reef in the Paracel Islands off the coast of Vietnam, 240 miles northeast of Danang. At the time she was loaded with 6000 tons of military machinery and supplies bound for Vietnam. It took seven days and 300 men to unload enough of the cargo for her to float off of the reef. Heavy earth moving equipment were put on barges, with the Rescue and salvage ship, the USS Current, helping in the operation. Although the first attempt to get her off the reef (on May 21) failed, the tugs USS Mataco, USS Tawakoni, USS Hitchiti, and USS Mahopac, finally were able to free her at high tide with only minor hull damage. She unloaded the remaining cargo at Danang.

The Minot Victory was eventually scrapped in 1985.

== See also ==
- List of Victory ships
- Liberty ship
- Type C1 ship
- Type C2 ship
- Type C3 ship

== Sources ==
- Sawyer, L.A. and W.H. Mitchell. Victory ships and tankers: The history of the ‘Victory type" cargo ships and of the tankers built in the United States of America during World War II, Cornell Maritime Press, 1974, 0-87033-182-5.
- United States Maritime Commission:
- Victory Cargo Ships
