= USS Bolster =

UN Navy rescue and salvage ship

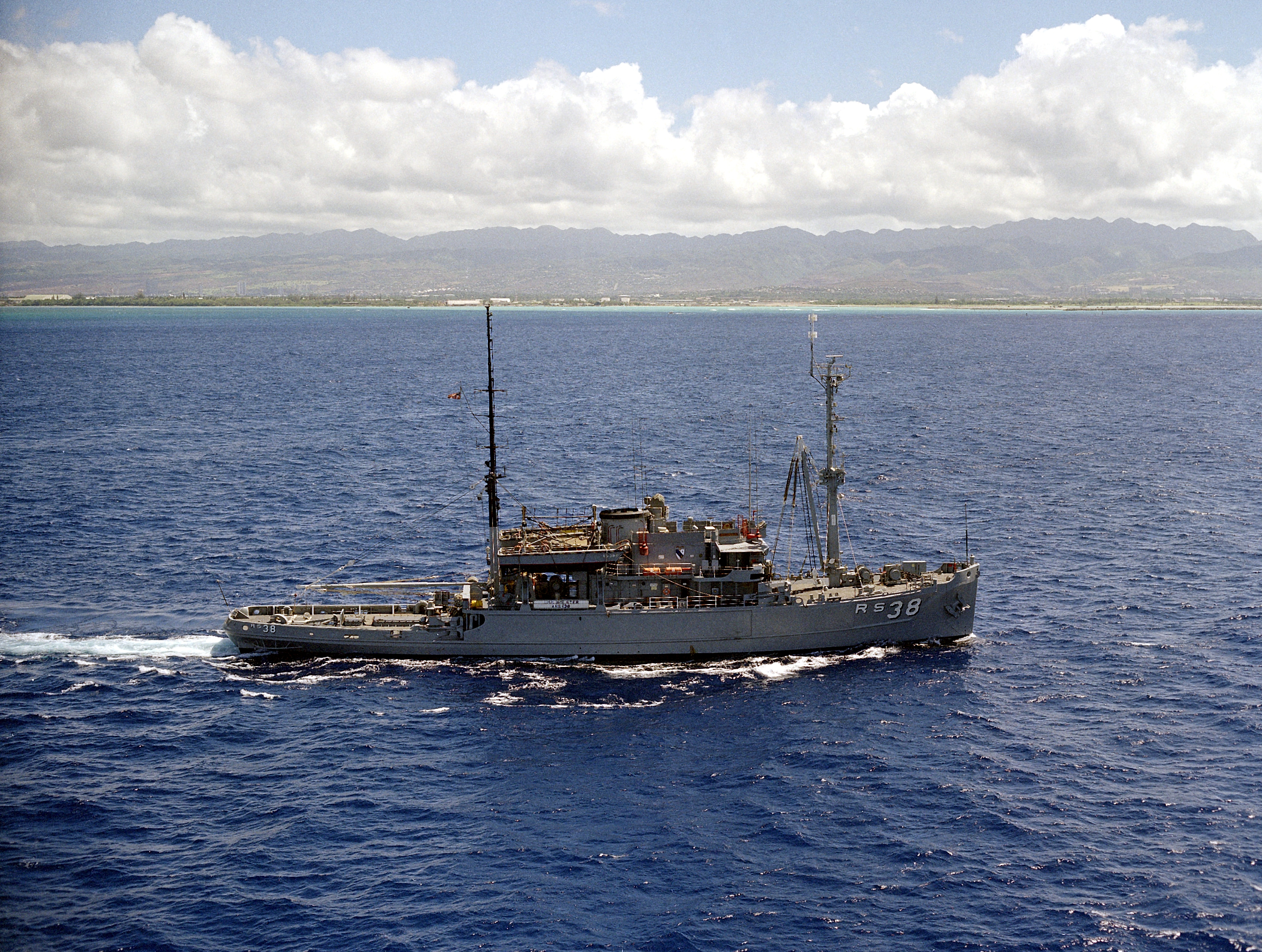
- USS Bolster on 1 June 1974

History

United States
- Builder: Basalt Rock Company
- Laid down: 20 July 1944
- Launched: 23 December 1944
- Commissioned: 1 May 1945
- Decommissioned: 24 September 1994
- Stricken: 24 September 1994
- Fate: Scrapped, 2011
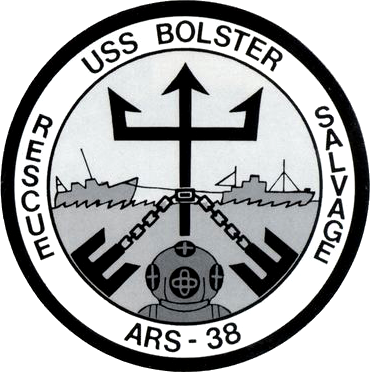
- Badge

General characteristics
- Tonnage: 1,441 tons
- Displacement: 1,497 tons(lt), 2,048 tons(fl)
- Length: 213 ft 6 in (65.07 m)
- Beam: 43 ft (13 m)
- Draught: 14 ft 8 in (4.47 m)
- Propulsion: Diesel-electric, twin screws, 2,780hp
- Speed: 15 knots
- Complement: 120
- Armament: two 20mm AA guns - 1 mounted on each bridge wing, two .50cal MG - mounts on bridge wing and foc'sl. Small arms including two M60's, two 870R's, six M14's, six .45's 1911A1.

USS Bolster (ARS-38) was a Bolster-class rescue and salvage ship acquired by the U.S. Navy during World War II and remained in service during the Korean War and the Vietnam War. Her task was to come to the aid of stricken vessels.

Bolster was launched 23 December 1944 by Basalt Rock Company in Napa, California; sponsored by Mrs. C. A. Mayo Jr., wife of Lieutenant Mayo, USNR; commissioned 1 May 1945 and joined the U.S. Pacific Fleet.

== End-of-World War II service ==
On 18 July 1945, after repair duty along the California coast, Bolster departed for Pearl Harbor. She remained there until 15 August when she sailed for Yokosuka, Japan. Bolster conducted repair and salvage operations in Japanese waters until leaving for Subic Bay, Luzon, 10 October 1946. She remained in the Philippines until April 1947 and then returned to Pearl Harbor via Okinawa, Guam, and Kwajalein.

== Korean War operations ==
Bolster operated alternately out of Pearl Harbor and Adak, Alaska, on salvage and towing duties until 22 August 1950. She then towed two barges to Sasebo, Japan, and remained in the Far East until 6 July 1951. During this tour she participated in the Inchon landing (15 September 1950) and the Hungnam evacuation (9–25 December 1950).

Since 1952 Bolster continued to operate out of Pearl Harbor and made six tours of the Far East, visiting Japan, Hong Kong, Korea, Okinawa, and the Philippine Islands.

== Vietnam service ==
Bolster operated in Vietnamese waters from 1966 to 1972 during the Vietnam War and was awarded 11 campaign stars. Members of Bolster's crew operated on land to extract USS Clark County (LST-601) from beach after grounding at Đức Phổ from 18 November to 1 December 1967. Bolster received the Combat Action Ribbon for her service in Vietnam.

== Note ==
The U.S. Navy (DANFS) advises that Bolster history updates for the years 1952 to 1994 are being developed.

== Decommissioning ==
Bolster was decommissioned on 24 September 1994 and struck from the Naval Vessel Register on the same day. She was disposed of by transfer to the Maritime Administration on 1 February 1999. There was a private effort to save the Bolster and turn it into a floating museum, however the effort was not successful. On 12 April 2011, MARAD awarded a contract to Marine Metals of Brownsville, Tx to dismantle Bolster for $462,223.31. Bolster departed the Suisun Bay Reserve Fleet on 23 May 2011 for hull cleaning at BAE Systems San Francisco Ship Repair. Bolster was towed to Brownsville upon completion of the cleaning and is currently undergoing scrapping.

== Military awards and honors ==
Bolster's crew was eligible for the following medals, ribbons, and commendations:

- Secretary of the Navy Letter of Commendation
- Navy Meritorious Unit Commendation
- Combat Action Ribbon with two gold stars
- American Campaign Medal
- Asiatic–Pacific Campaign Medal
- World War II Victory Medal
- Navy Occupation Service Medal (with "ASIA" clasp)
- National Defense Service Medal with two stars
- Korean Service Medal with seven campaign stars
- Vietnam Service Medal with eleven campaign stars
- Republic of Vietnam Gallantry Cross Unit Citation (2 awards)
- United Nations Service Medal
- Republic of Korea War Service Medal (retroactive)
- Republic of Vietnam Campaign Medal

Bolster received seven battle stars for her Korean War service (9 September 1950 – 6 July 1951, 24 January – 16 August 1952, and 16 February – 15 April 1953);

- North Korean Aggression
- Communist China Aggression
- First UN Counter Offensive
- Communist China Spring Offensive
- Second Korean Winter
- Korean Defense Summer-Fall 1952
- Korea Summer-Fall 1953

Bolster received eleven campaign stars for Vietnam War service:

- Vietnamese Counteroffensive
- Vietnamese Counteroffensive - Phase II
- Tet Counteroffensive
- Tet 69/Counteroffensive
- Vietnam Summer-Fall 1969
- Vietnam Winter-Summer 1970
- Sanctuary Counteroffensive
- Vietnamese Counteroffensive - Phase VII
- Consolidation I
- Consolidation II
- Vietnam Ceasefire
