= Darlene Iskra =

American Navy officer

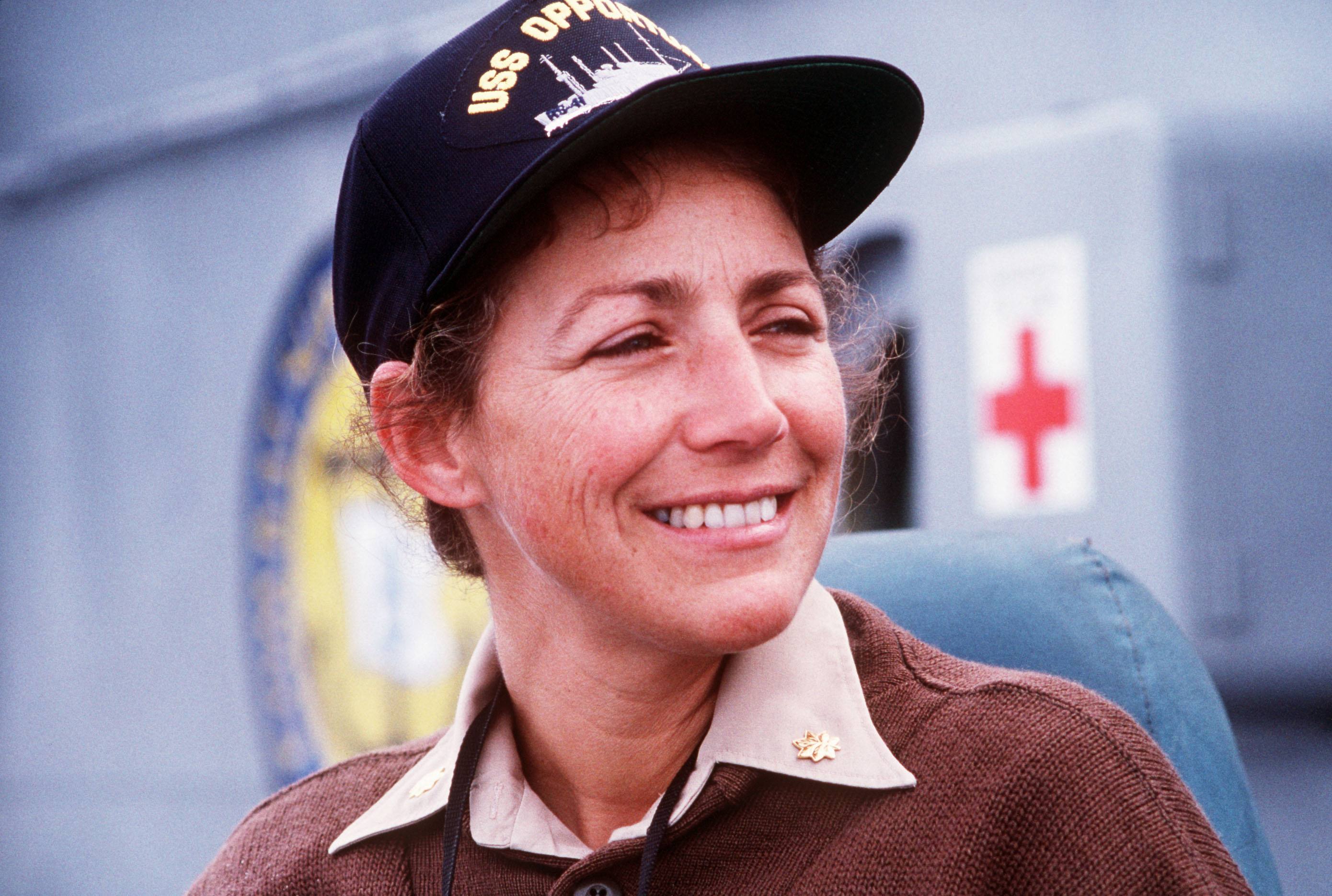
- LCDR Darlene M. Iskra after appointment as commanding officer of the USS Opportune
- Born: 1952 (age 72–73)
- Occupation: US Naval Officer
- Years active: 1979-2000

Darlene Marie Iskra (born 1952) is a retired United States Navy officer. Upon assuming command of the rescue and salvage ship USS Opportune on December 27, 1990, she became the first woman to command a U.S. Navy vessel. She continued to serve on Guam as a liaison officer for the Commander Naval Forces Marianas. After being transferred back to the continental United States, she retired from the Navy in 2000.

After earning her BA at San Francisco State University, she earned an MA in National Security and Strategic Studies from the Naval War College and an MA and Ph.D. in Sociology from the University of Maryland.

She wrote Women in the United States Armed Forces: A Guide to the Issues (United States, ABC-CLIO, 2010.)
