= USS Opportune =

1945 Bolster-class rescue and salvage ship

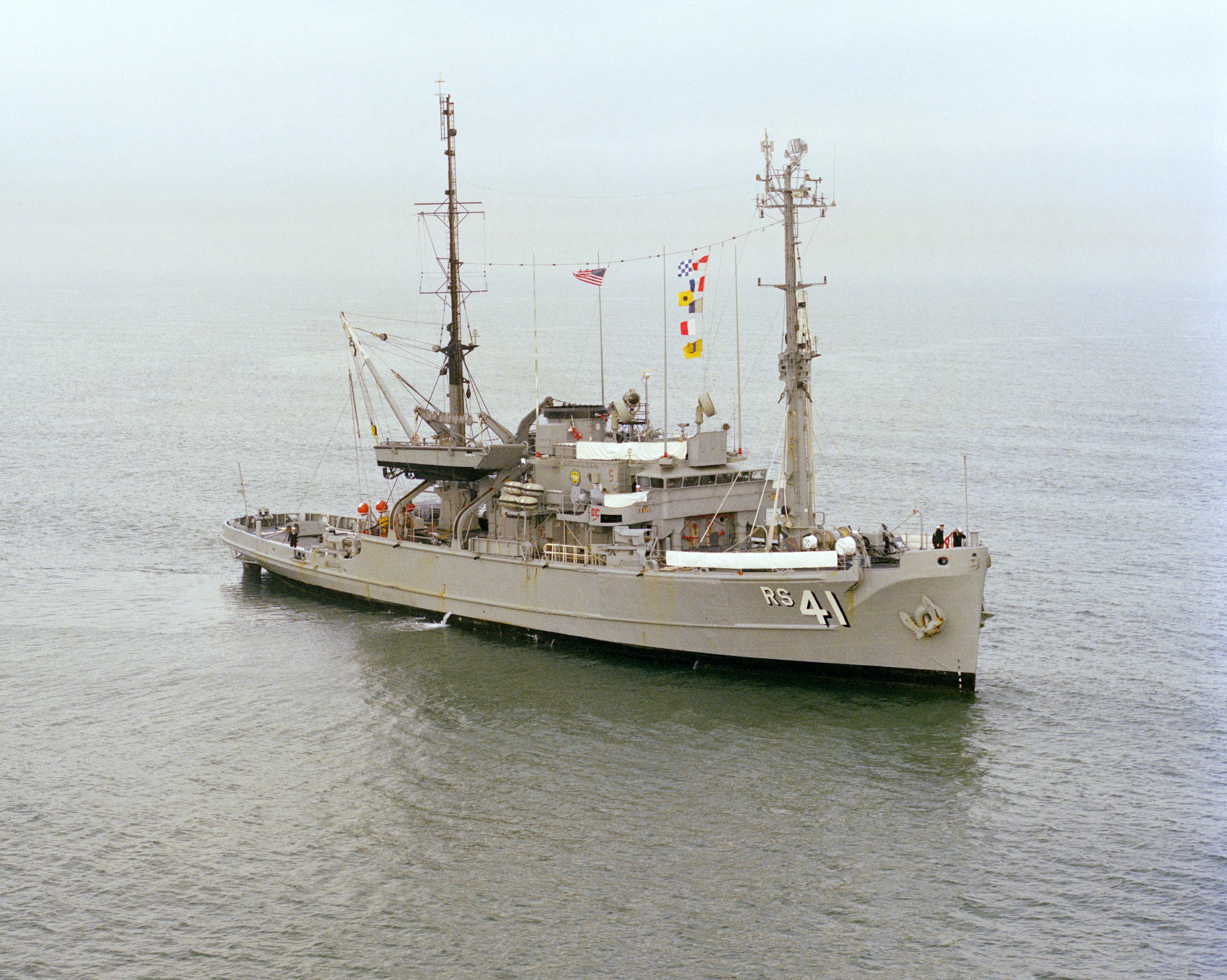

History

United States
- Name: Opportune
- Builder: Basalt Rock Company
- Laid down: 13 September 1944
- Launched: 31 March 1945
- Commissioned: 5 October 1945
- Decommissioned: 30 April 1993
- Stricken: 30 April 1993
- Fate: Scrapped, 5 December 2003

General characteristics
- Tonnage: 1,441 tons
- Displacement: 1,497 tons(lt), 2,048 tons(fl)
- Length: 213 ft 6 in (65.07 m)
- Beam: 39 ft (12 m)
- Draft: 14 ft 8 in (4.47 m)
- Propulsion: diesel-electric, twin screws, 2,780 hp (2,070 kW)
- Speed: 15 knots (28 km/h; 17 mph)
- Complement: 120
- Armament: two 40 mm guns

USS Opportune (ARS-41) was a Bolster-class rescue and salvage ship acquired by the United States Navy during World War II. Her task was to come to the aid of stricken vessels.

Opportune was laid down 13 September 1944 by Basalt Rock Company in Napa, California; launched 31 March 1945; sponsored by Mrs. Kenneth Sanger; and commissioned at Mare Island, California, 5 October 1945.

== Post-World War II operations ==
After training on the California coast, Opportune sailed from San Pedro, Los Angeles, 11 December 1945 for San Juan, Puerto Rico, her base for the next eight years. Operating primarily as a salvage schoolship for the Atlantic Fleet, Opportune also towed disabled craft among Caribbean ports and on occasion, to Norfolk, Virginia, and New York. Frequently she acted as air-sea rescue tug during fleet operations off Culebra Island.

== North Atlantic operations ==
She made her homeport at Norfolk from 23 October 1953. Each year she sailed north to take part in resupply operations for northern stations of the Army, Air Force, Navy, and Weather Service, often serving for extended periods as station ship at Naval Air Station Argentia, Newfoundland. On each such deployment she performed the variety of services which makes the fleet repair and salvage ship a Navy workhorse: towing barges and disabled craft; repairing other ships, dock, and port facilities; salvaging and lifting sunken ships and equipment; laying cable; fighting fires; tending buoys; providing deep sea divers; installing moorings; searching for and recovering downed aircraft; and aiding men and ships in distress at sea. She carried out the same duties from Norfolk and in the Caribbean when not operating in the north.

== Goodwill missions ==
Opportune performed missions of international goodwill and mercy on her first European cruise (April–June 1960). She escorted two Iranian ships to the entrance of the Mediterranean, then sailed directly to Agadir, Morocco, where she delivered 50 tons of clothing donated by the Navy for victims of the recent earthquake. Princess Lasla Aisha, sister of the King of Morocco, came on board to thank Opportune for her aid.

A second European cruise (May–June 1961) represented a major contribution to the strengthening of the Navy's power to keep peace. Opportune's captain, Lt. Comdr. Thomas F. Byrnes Jr., took command of a task group which included four Navy and two civilian tugs. The assignment: tow to the Polaris Submarine Base at Holy Loch, Scotland, four large sections of AFDB–7, an enormous floating drydock. The 4,400-mile passage began at Mayport, Florida, and took 32 days at sea at an average speed of 5.9 knots (10.9 km/h; 6.8 mph). This difficult mission accomplished, Opportune visited Belfast, Northern Ireland, before returning to Norfolk 23 June.

== East Coast operations ==
For the next three years the salvage ship operated on the East Coast of the United States and in the Caribbean, devoting most of her effort to cable laying operations. Highlights of this period were assistance to Norwegian ship SS Tarrantel which had been damaged in a collision off the entrance to Chesapeake Bay in the spring of 1962; service off Cape Canaveral, Florida, at the launch of Major Gordon Cooper's Faith 7 Project Mercury space capsule a year later; and searching for inactive destroyer escort Fogg, which had broken free during hurricane Jenny while being towed to Charleston, South Carolina, and escorting the maverick to safety at Norfolk late in October 1963.

== Circumnavigating the globe ==
Opportune shed her cable laying gear at Norfolk the summer of 1964 and spent the remainder of the year supporting fleet training operations. After overhaul during the summer of 1965, Opportune visited Scotland in the fall to take in tow a leased Royal Navy lift craft ALC-24 for delivery to Subic Bay, Philippine Islands. She departed Rosyth 24 November and touched Gibraltar and Crete before transiting the Suez Canal. The long voyage ended when Opportune delivered her tow to Subic Bay 2 February 1966. Underway again four days later, she made Yokosuka, Japan; Pearl Harbor; San Diego, California; and Acapulco, Mexico en route to the Panama Canal. The ship reached Little Creek, Virginia, 8 April 1966. She took pride in having completed the longest tow on record by a U. S. Navy salvage ship and in being the first Navy salvage ship to circumnavigate the globe.

== Continued operations ==
For the remainder of the year Opportune operated along the east coast visiting the Canal Zone in June and in August she returned to Cape Canaveral for the unmanned Apollo 202 launch. Into 1970 Opportune continued to serve the Atlantic Fleet.

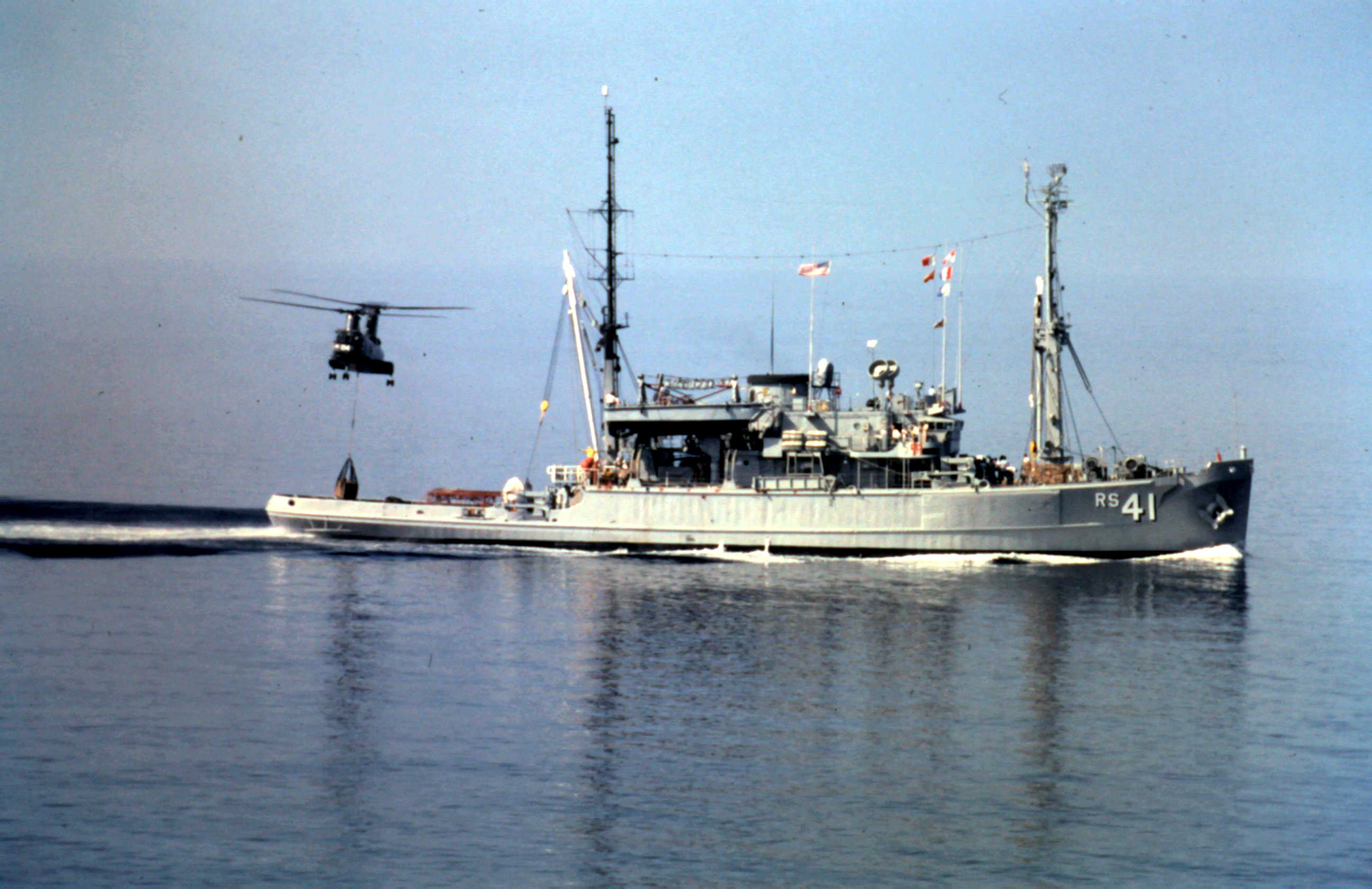
USS Opportune receiving VERTREP from USS Concord in the Adriatic, 1983

Opportune assisted with the recovery of the Space Shuttle Challenger (destroyed of the coast of Florida in 1986) and was later deployed in support of Operation Just Cause to keep the Panama Canal open and operating at normal capacity. Opportune conducted several support missions in the Caribbean and conducted several interesting towing operations prior to deployment to the Mediterranean during Operation Desert Storm/Shield as the US Navy's standby rescue and salvage ship. Opportune assisted in the recovery of numerous downed aircraft (fixed wing and helicopters) and assisted with several at-sea firefighting/towing operations prior to returning to her home port at Little Creek, Virginia.

== First US Navy ship commanded by a woman ==
LCDR Darlene Iskra became the first woman commanding officer of a US Navy ship when she assumed command of Opportune at Naples, Italy on 27 December 1990. She served as the commanding officer until 1993.

== Decommissioning ==
Opportune was decommissioned and struck from the Naval Register, 30 April 1993. Her title was transferred to the Maritime Administration (MARAD), 1 February 1999. Opportune was laid up in the National Defense Reserve Fleet, James River, Fort Eustis, Virginia. Final Disposition: a contract for scrapping was awarded to Bay Bridge Enterprises, Chesapeake, Virginia, and Opportune was towed from the National Defense Reserve Fleet, James River to Bay Bridge Enterprises, Chesapeake, Virginia, 5 December 2003.

== Military awards and honors ==
Navy records indicate the following battle stars for Opportune: Her crew was eligible for the following medals, ribbons and commendations:

- Navy Unit Commendation
- Meritorious Unit Commendation (5 stars)
- Coast Guard Meritorious Unit Commendation
- Navy Battle "E" Ribbon (3 awards)
- American Campaign Medal
- World War II Victory Medal
- National Defense Service Medal with two stars
- Armed Forces Expeditionary Medal (Cuba)
- Vietnam Service Medal (1 campaign star for the Vietnam Counteroffensive Campaign (19 January to 26 February 1966)
- Southwest Asia Service Medal with star
- Vietnam Campaign Medal
