= USS Tawakoni =

Tugboat of the United States Navy

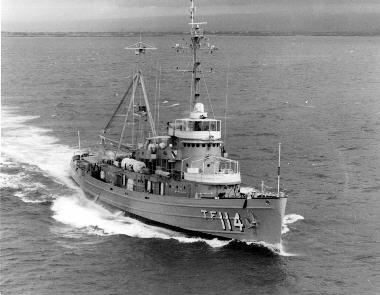
- USS Tawakoni (ATF-114), date and location unknown.

History

United States
- Name: USS Tawakoni
- Builder: United Engineering Company, San Francisco, California
- Launched: 28 October 1943
- Sponsored by: Mrs. R. F. Parker
- Commissioned: 16 September 1944
- Stricken: 1 June 1978
- Motto: "Salvage, Towing, Diving"
- Honors and awards: 2 battle stars (World War II); 3 battle stars (Korean War); 4 campaign stars (Vietnam War)
- Fate: Sold to Republic of China, 1 June 1978

Republic of China
- Name: Da Han; (大漢)
- Acquired: 1 June 1978
- Decommissioned: 1 November 2020
- Identification: ATF-553
- Fate: Sunk as a target ship, 15 August 2023

General characteristics
- Class & type: Abnaki-class fleet ocean tug
- Displacement: 1,330 long tons standard
- Length: 205 ft (62 m)
- Beam: 38.5 ft (11.7 m)
- Draft: 17 ft (5.2 m)
- Propulsion: Diesel-electric, single screw
- Speed: 16.5 kn (19.0 mph; 30.6 km/h)
- Complement: 8 officers, 68 enlisted
- Armament: 1 × 3 in (76 mm) dual-purpose gun; 2 × twin 40 mm antiaircraft guns; 2 × 20 mm single antiaircraft guns; 2 depth charge tracks

USS Tawakoni (ATF-114) was an Abnaki-class fleet ocean tug that served on active duty with the United States Navy from 1944 to 1978, seeing action in World War II, the Korean War and the Vietnam War. After 34 years of service, she was sold to the Republic of China Navy, where she served until November 2020.

== History ==
=== Service in the United States Navy ===
Tawakoni was named after a Caddoan Indian tribe of the Wichita group that lived in Texas on the banks of the middle Brazos and Trinity Rivers during the 18th and 19th centuries. The ship was launched on 28 October 1943, sponsored by Mrs. R. F. Parker of La Jolla, California. She was launched the same day and at the same facility as the USS Rebel.

Tawakoni began her naval career in the Pacific theater, joining the United States Fifth Fleet just in time for the invasion of Iwo Jima, which took place in February 1945. During this battle Tawakoni assisted the destroyer minesweeper USS Gamble, which had been hit by two 250-pound bombs on 18 February. She also assisted in retraction, towing and salvage operations off Iwo Jima until the latter part of March, when she returned to Ulithi for repairs to minor damage suffered during the battle.

On 6 April 1945, Tawakoni was involved in the invasion of Okinawa when she was attacked by several Japanese kamikaze planes while assisting the badly damaged USS Bush about fifty miles from the island. Through maneuvering and gunnery on the part of her crew, the ship managed to down five Japanese aircraft while suffering minimal damage herself. On 16 April Tawakoni participated in the invasion of Ie Shima, where she towed the damaged USS Laffey to safety while downing yet another kamikaze plane. On 1 July she made for Leyte in the Philippines, which is where V-J Day found her.

==== Korean War ====
Following the Second World War Tawakoni generally operated in the Pacific area, performing towing and other services and visiting ports from the United States to Asia. In November 1950, she joined Task Force 90, Amphibious Force, Far East, operating in support of United Nations efforts in Korea. During the Korean War, she took part in three campaigns: Communist China Aggression (1950–51); First UN Counteroffensive (1951); and the Communist China Spring Offensive (1951). She planted buoys in the channels at Wonsan, Hungnam and Inchon harbors, and provided towing services to ships of the United States 7th Fleet during her Korean service.

==== Operation Castle ====
In March 1954, Tawakoni was one of the ships tasked to support Operation Castle, a series of high-energy (high-yield) nuclear tests by Navy Joint Task Force SEVEN (JTF-7) at Bikini Atoll. The highest level of contamination recorded aboard the ship during this operation was 0.2 mr/hr.

==== Vietnam War ====
During the Vietnam War, Tawakoni would see service in three campaigns: Vietnam Counteroffensive Phase VI (1968–69), Tet 69 Counteroffensive (1969), and Winter-Spring 1970. During Phase VI, she participated in the surveillance of Soviet electronic intelligence trawlers monitoring U.S. operations in the Gulf of Tonkin. She also assisted in towing, recovery and similar operations during her time in Vietnam. May 1967 she rescued SS Minot Victory.

=== Service in the Republic of China Navy ===
In June 1978, Tawakoni was decommissioned and sold to Republic of China under the Security Assistance Program, where she was recommissioned in the ROC Navy as ROCS Da Han (ATF-553). She served with this force until November 2020. This ship was sunk as a target ship on 15 August 2023.

== Awards ==
Tawakoni was awarded the appropriate service medals for World War II (including the American Campaign Medal and the Asiatic–Pacific Campaign Medal), Korea and Vietnam. She was also awarded two battle stars for her World War II service, three for her Korean War service, and four campaign stars for her Vietnam War service, together with a Combat Action Ribbon and a Navy Unit Commendation. Her crew during these periods earned the Navy Occupation Service Medal, the Armed Forces Expeditionary Medal, and the Republic of Korea War Service Medal, among other awards.

== Sources ==
- Photo gallery of USS Tawakoni at NavSource Naval History
- Dictionary of American Naval Fighting Ships, "USS Tawakoni" at ibiblio.org. Contains history of the Tawakoni.
- History of USS Tawakoni (ATF-114) During Operation Castle 1954 at nuclearfiles.org. Gives details of Tawakoni's activities during this nuclear test operation.
