= USS Recovery =

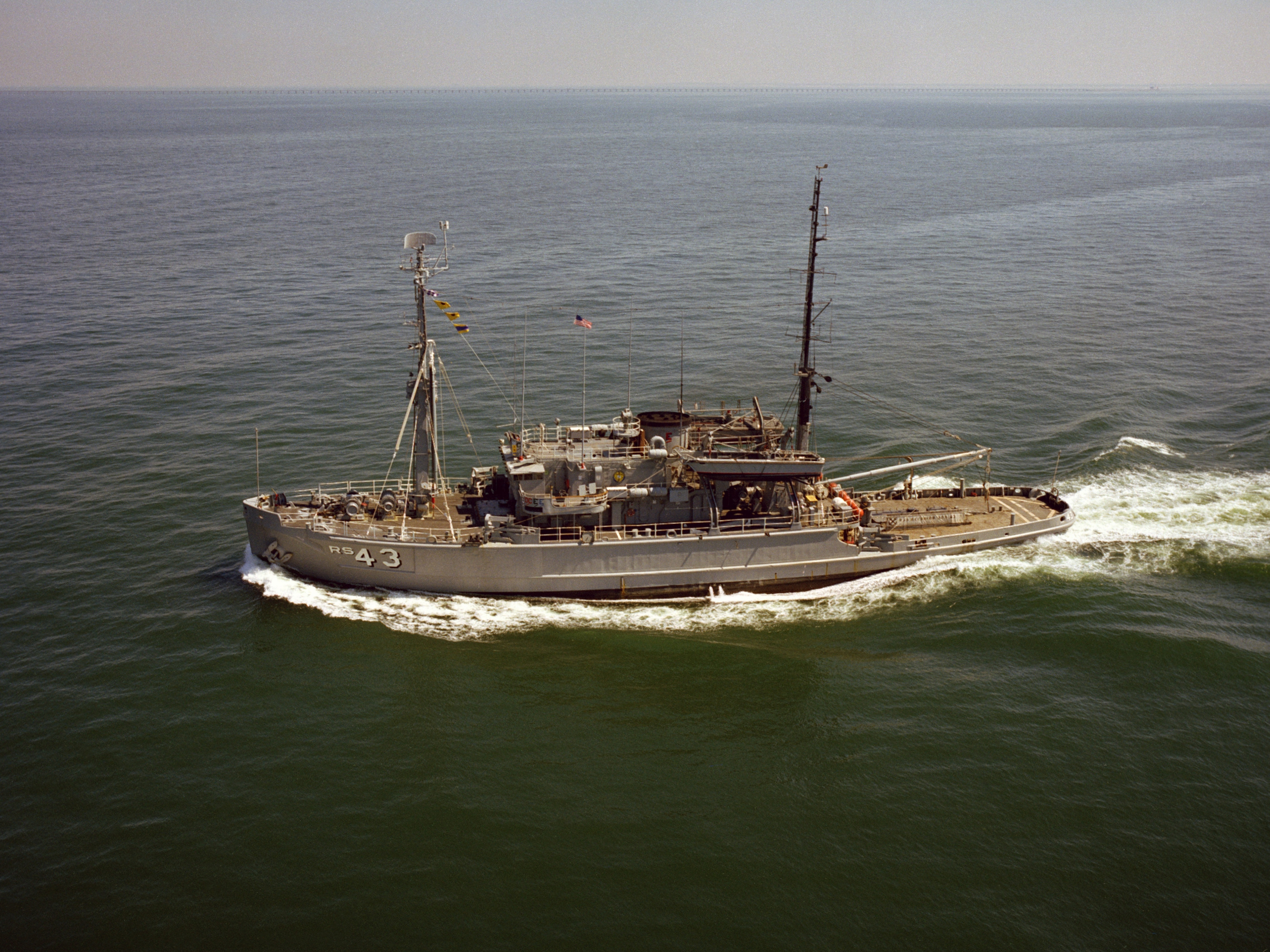

History

United States
- Name: USS Recovery
- Builder: Basalt Rock Company
- Laid down: 6 January 1945
- Launched: 4 August 1945
- Sponsored by: Mrs. Harry Burris
- Commissioned: 15 May 1946
- Decommissioned: 20 September 1994
- Stricken: 30 September 1994
- Identification: Hull number: ARS-43
- Fate: Transferred to Taiwan, 30 September 1998

Taiwan
- Name: ROCS Da Juen
- Acquired: 30 September 1998
- Commissioned: 1 March 1999
- Identification: Hull number: ARS-556
- Status: Active

General characteristics
- Class & type: Bolster-class rescue and salvage ship
- Displacement: 1,995 long tons (2,027 t) full
- Length: 213 ft 6 in (65.07 m)
- Beam: 44 ft (13 m)
- Draft: 15 ft (4.6 m)
- Speed: 11 knots (20 km/h; 13 mph)
- Complement: 84 officers and enlisted
- Armament: 4 × 40 mm guns; 6 × 20 mm guns

USS Recovery (ARS-43) was a Bolster-class rescue and salvage ship of the United States Navy, which remained in commission for over 48 years. Laid down on 6 January 1945 by the Basalt Rock Company in Napa, California, the ship was launched on 4 August 1945, and commissioned on 15 May 1946. In American service, the vessel supported NASA's Project Mercury spaceflights and recovery and the search for the lost submarine USS Thresher. The ship was removed from American service, transferred to Taiwan, and commissioned on 1 March 1999 in the Republic of China Navy as ROCS Da Juen (ARS-556). The vessel was later renamed Ta De.

== Construction and career ==
The vessel was laid down on 6 January 1945 by the Basalt Rock Company in Napa, California. The ship was launched on 4 August 1945, sponsored by Mrs. Harry Burris, and commissioned on 15 May 1946.

=== 1946–1960 ===
Following shakedown, Recovery operated briefly out of San Diego, then on 9 August got underway for the Panama Canal Zone. Homeported at Naval Station Rodman from her arrival on 30 August, until September 1953, the ship performed salvage, repair, and towing operations in the Canal Zone and the Caribbean; provided men and equipment for underwater projects of the Army Engineers; served as a training ship for Naval Reservists of the 15th Naval District; and, after April 1952, added a second-class diving school to her duties. Transferred to the east coast in October 1953, Recovery arrived at her new homeport, Norfolk, Virginia, on the 11th only to depart soon after for her first tour in northern latitudes in support of MSTS North Atlantic and Arctic resupply programs. She arrived at Goose Bay on 3 November and operated off Labrador, Newfoundland, and Nova Scotia into the new year, returning to Norfolk on 29 January 1954.

In addition to annual deployments to subarctic and arctic waters to support Military Sea Transportation Service operations over the next seven years, Recovery's mobile ability to provide salvage, repair, towing, diving, and rescue services to the fleet was utilized along the lengths of the Atlantic and Gulf coasts and in the Caribbean as well as in the Chesapeake Bay area. Occasionally assigned to experimental programs, in 1960 she assisted in shock test programs at Key West and in the Bahamas and in escape and recovery tests off the Virginia coast for the National Aeronautical and Space Administration's man-in-space program. That year she also provided disaster relief for the outer islands of the Bahamas in the wake of Hurricane Donna.

=== 1961–1970 ===
In February 1961 the Arctic came to Chesapeake Bay and Recovery assisted Coast Guard vessels in clearing heavy ice congestion and aiding stranded merchantmen. In May she again operated in support of NASA's space program and directed offshore standby recovery forces during Commander Shepard's suborbital flight, the United States' first crewed space flight. Salvage operations then took Recovery north to assist USS Luiseno and other vessels in pulling decommissioned destroyer Baldwin off the beach at Montauk Point, New York. The destroyer was refloated, but because damage was beyond economic repair, she was towed out to sea and sunk by gunfire from two ships. In July Recovery returned to Cape Canaveral and joined the support force for Major Grissom's suborbital flight. Between August and November she supported the Arctic resupply program; then, in 1962, provided target towing service before returning to Florida for Lieutenant Colonel Glenn's February orbital mission.

East coast and Caribbean operations occupied the remainder of the year and in 1963 she added oceanographic survey work to her duties. In northern waters in April, she was diverted to assist in searching for the lost submarine USS Thresher. First on the scene, she recovered samples of oil and grease, plastic, and styrofoam.

In July 1964 Recovery returned from her last oceanographic mission and her survey equipment was removed. In September she sailed to Scotland to participate in exercise "Teamwork", thence proceeded to Spain for "Steel Pike", the largest peacetime amphibious operation. In November she returned to the United States and resumed duty out of Norfolk. In 1967 she again sailed north for extended operations in northern latitudes, returning to Norfolk in October, after a goodwill visit to Montreal, Quebec, Canada. Three months later, in January 1968, she again assisted with shock tests at Key West; then, until July, was engaged primarily in towing operations. These included the January 1968 recovery of the incomplete nuclear submarine Pogy (SSN-647), which had been adrift for three days off the Florida coast during towing from Philadelphia to Ingalls Shipbuilding in Pascagoula, Mississippi. On 25 July she deployed, for the first time, to the Mediterranean, where for the next seven months she provided salvage, repair, diving, and towing services to the 6th Fleet. She returned to Norfolk in mid-February 1969 and resumed operations along the eastern seaboard and in the Caribbean, continuing such operations in that area into 1970.

=== 1970–1994 ===
In late January 1970, she steamed out of Little Creek, Virginia, for a deployment in the Mediterranean. By 18 July, she had returned to normal operations along the Atlantic seaboard and in the Caribbean. Recovery continued in this employment until 4 August 1971, at which time she embarked on her third Mediterranean cruise. Seven months later she returned to Little Creek, Virginia, and engaged in normal operations along the east coast.

Lieutenant Commander Kathleen A. McGrath commanded the ship in 1993 and 1994. McGrath was the first woman to command a ship in the US Navy.

=== Service with Taiwan ===
Recovery was decommissioned and simultaneously struck from the Naval Vessel Register on 30 September 1994. She was transferred to Taiwan on 30 September 1998, under the Security Assistance Program, and commissioned on 1 March 1999 in the Republic of China Navy as ROCS Da Juen (ARS-556), where she remains in commission under the name Ta De (ARS-556).
