= Datuo-class rescue and salvage ship =

Class of military salvage ship

History

PRC
- Status: Active

General characteristics
- Class & type: Datuo
- Type: Rescue and salvage ship (ARS)
- Length: 60 m (196 ft 10 in)
- Propulsion: Marine diesel
- Sensors & processing systems: Navigation radar

The Datuo class is a class of little known rescue and salvage ships (ARS) built in the People's Republic of China (PRC) for the People's Liberation Army Navy (PLAN). The exact domestic Chinese type designation remains unknown, and this class is identified by its NATO reporting name Datuo class, or 大拖 in Chinese, meaning "big tug".

Specification:

- Length: 60 meters (196 ft 10 in)

The Datuo class in PLAN service is designated by a combination of two Chinese characters followed by a three-digit number. The second Chinese character is Tuo (拖), meaning Tug in Chinese, because these ships are rescue tugs, and thus can also be used as tugs. The first Chinese character denotes which fleet the ship is in service with, with East (Dong, 东) for East Sea Fleet, North (Bei, 北) for North Sea Fleet, and South (Nan, 南) for South Sea Fleet. However, the pennant numbers may have changed due to the change of Chinese naval ships naming convention. As of 2022, a total of four ships have been identified, plus several more units under construction:

Type	NATO designation	Pennant No.	Name (English)	Name (Han 中文)	Commissioned	Displacement	Fleet	Status							
Datuo-class rescue and salvage ship (ARS)	Datuo class	Bei-Tuo 742	North Tug 742	北拖 742	?	? t	North Sea Fleet	Active							
Datuo-class rescue and salvage ship (ARS)	Datuo class	Nan-Tuo 159	South Tug 159	南拖 159	?	? t	South Sea Fleet	Active							
Datuo-class rescue and salvage ship (ARS)	Datuo class	Nan-Tuo 194	South Tug 194	南拖 194	?	? t	South Sea Fleet	Active							
Datuo-class rescue and salvage ship (ARS)	Datuo class	Nan-Tuo 196	South Tug 196	南拖 196	?	? t	South Sea Fleet	Active	Various	Various	Various	?	? t	?	Under construction
