= USS Dynamic (AM-432) =

Minesweeper of the United States Navy

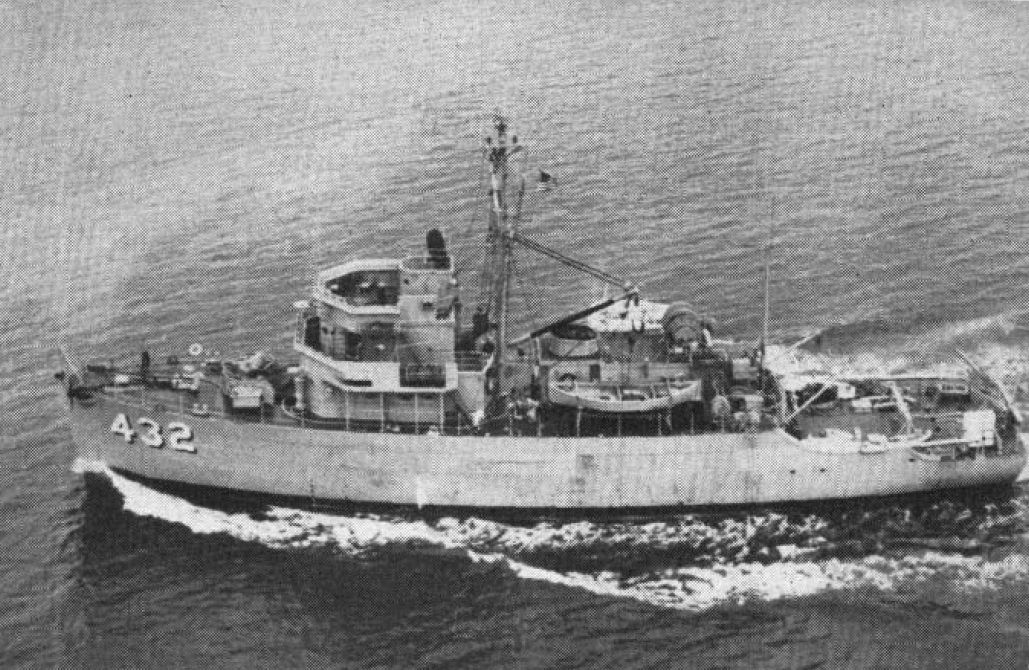

History

United States
- Name: USS Dynamic (AM-432)
- Builder: Colberg Boat Works, Stockton, California
- Laid down: 31 October 1951
- Launched: 17 December 1952
- Commissioned: 15 December 1953, as AM-432
- Reclassified: MSO-432 (Ocean Minesweeper), 7 February 1955
- Decommissioned: 8 June 1971
- Stricken: 1 August 1974
- Fate: Sold to Spain, 17 July 1971

Spain
- Name: Guadalete (M41)
- Acquired: 17 July 1971
- Reclassified: PVZ-41, 1980
- Decommissioned: 15 July 1998
- Fate: Unknown

General characteristics
- Class & type: Aggressive-class minesweeper
- Displacement: 630 long tons (640 t) light; 775 long tons (787 t) full load
- Length: 172 ft (52 m)
- Beam: 35 ft (11 m)
- Draft: 10 ft (3.0 m)
- Propulsion: 4 × Packard ID1700 diesel engines; 2 × shafts; 2 × controllable pitch propellers
- Speed: 14 knots (26 km/h; 16 mph)
- Complement: 6 officers, 74 enlisted
- Armament: 1 × single 40 mm gun mount; 2 × .50 cal (12.7 mm) twin machine guns

USS Dynamic (AM-432/MSO-432) was an Agile-class minesweeper in service with the United States Navy and the Spanish Navy. Laid down on 31 October 1951 at Colberg Boat Works, Stockton, California; launched on 17 December 1952; commissioned as USS Dynamic (AM-432) on 15 December 1953; redesignated MSO-432, 7 February 1955.

== Service history ==
Assigned to Mine Division 91, Squadron 9, Mine Force, Pacific Fleet, Dynamic operated out of her home port of Long Beach, California, that included training with other ships, aircraft, soldiers and Marines, and with minesweepers of other navies. She cruised to the Far East in 1957-58 visiting ports in Japan, Korea, and Taiwan, and participated in minesweeping exercises with ships of the Republic of China and Korean navies.

She made a similar cruise in the first half of 1960, joined the other fleet units in the "Pacific Festival" at San Francisco, California, in September and received a yard overhaul during the remainder of the year.

Dynamic became a part of Mine Division 91 in September 1967. The division consisted of Dynamic, Engage, Impervious, Inflict and Fortify.

== Decommissioning ==
Dynamic was decommissioned on 8 June 1971, and sold to Spain on 17 July 1971 under the Security Assistance Program to serve as Guadalete (M41). Dynamic was struck from the Naval Register on 1 August 1974. Guadalete was reclassified PVZ-41 in 1980; and decommissioned on 15 July 1998. Fate unknown.
