= USS Weight =

US Navy rescue and salvage ship

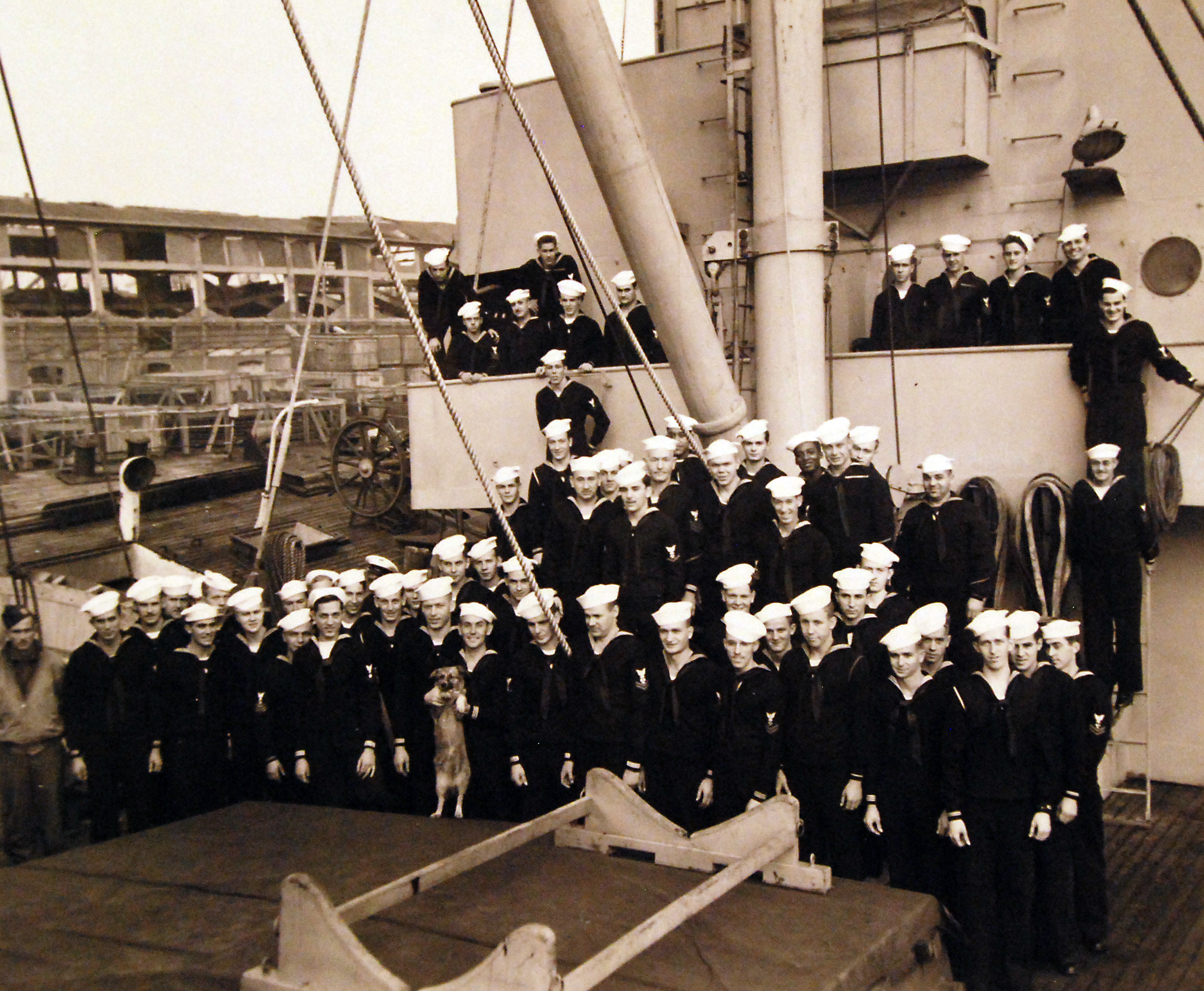
- Crew of the USS Weight

History

United States
- Ordered: as HMS Plymouth Salvor (BARS-7)
- Laid down: 7 April 1942
- Launched: 21 April 1943
- Acquired: 11 January 1943
- Commissioned: 14 August 1943
- Decommissioned: 29 March 1946
- Stricken: 1 May 1946
- Fate: Sold, 24 July 1947; Most likely scrapped

General characteristics
- Displacement: 1,232t.(lt) 1,500 tons(fl)
- Length: 183 ft 3 in (55.85 m)
- Beam: 38 ft 2 in (11.63 m)
- Draught: 13 ft 11 in (4.24 m)
- Propulsion: diesel-electric, twin screws, 2,780 hp (2,070 kW)
- Speed: 11.5 knots
- Complement: 65
- Armament: one single 3 in (76 mm) gun mount, two 20 mm guns

USS Weight (ARS-35) was a Weight-class rescue and salvage ship acquired by the U.S. Navy during World War II. Her task was to come to the aid of stricken vessels.

Plymouth Salvor (a wooden-hulled salvage vessel originally earmarked for transfer to Great Britain under lend-lease and classified as BARS-7) was laid down on 7 April 1942 at Wilmington, Delaware, by the American Car and Foundry Co.; reclassified ARS-35 on 11 January 1943 and named Weight on 15 March 1943. The ship was launched on 21 April 1943, sponsored by Mrs. H. E. Haven, the wife of the Supervisor of Shipbuilding at the Dravo Corp. of Wilmington; and commissioned at her builder's yard on 14 August 1943.

== World War II service ==
Weight shifted to the Philadelphia Navy Yard on 16 August, where she fitted out prior to moving to Cape May, New Jersey, en route to New York City. Reaching New York City late on the 23d, the salvage vessel remained there until the 27th, when she sailed for Norfolk, Virginia, in company with Extricate (ARS-16). After touching at Annapolis, Maryland, en route on the 29th, the salvage ships reached Norfolk later that day.

Following a brief shakedown, the ship was fitted out at the Norfolk Navy Yard from 5 to 13 September and remained in the Hampton Roads vicinity until late in the month. She departed her anchorage on 25 September and joined Convoy UGS-19, bound for North Africa.

=== Italy and North Africa operations ===
Reaching Bizerte, Tunisia, on the 16th, Weight sailed for Italy on the 27th and reached Naples, Italy, on the 29th. For almost the next three months, the salvage ship performed harbor clearance and salvage operations, an existence frequently interrupted by air raid alerts, and by air raids themselves, and the results of those attacks. Late on 5 November, soon after reaching Naples, she was called upon to turn her monitors (fire-fighting equipment) upon a serious warehouse blaze. While the ship was maneuvering to get into the best possible position to fight the fire, her starboard propeller struck some submerged wreckage, bending one blade out of alignment and curling the others about three inches each. By 0415 on the 6th, the blaze was controlled.

Moored to the wreckage of the Italian ship SS Nirvo, Weight performed salvage operations on that vessel through mid-November, before she shifted berths alongside the wrecks of SS Irish Monarch and SS Silvano. She also raised sunken LCVP's and fought a fire that had started in cargo carried by LCT-309, spending much of her time on New Year's Eve fighting that blaze.

On 2 January 1944, Weight shifted to a berth alongside the wreck of the former German merchantman SS Resolute where, over the next few days, she tended to the mine damage suffered by the British merchant vessel SS Largs Bay. Weight later provided fresh water to YMS-69, repairs to LST-861, LCT 285, and freed the port screw of LCI-837. She also conducted salvage and wreckage clearance operations on a sunken Italian destroyer and towed HMS Thruster off a nearby beach where she had gone aground.

=== Anzio operations ===
Weight sailed from Naples at 0755 on 28 January and, reaching the Anzio beachhead the next day, observed German bombers making direct hits on the British cruiser HMS Spartan and the American merchantman SS Samuel Huntington. Weight commenced salvage operations on the stranded LCT-223 while explosions from the burning Samuel Huntington shook the area.

After dragging LCT-288 clear, Weight got underway to fight the blaze on the wrecked Liberty ship, Samuel Huntington. The salvage vessel trained both monitors (large deck-mounted water guns) and a 2½-inch hose on the wreck and between 1605 and 1745, fought the fire that ravaged the freighter. Securing at 1745 Weight moved briefly away with the wreck still smoking but returned at 2207 to anchor alongside and renew her efforts to contain the flames.

However, Weight's work off the Anzio beaches was not yet done. In company with the British salvage vessel Weazel and aided by bulldozers ashore, she attempted to salvage the grounded British tank landing craft, LCT 542. Weight's divers cleared the fouled screws of SC-497, and the ship's force repaired LCT 288 and again fought fires on Samuel Huntington. Weight finally departed Anzio at 0845 on 5 February and returned to Naples later that day.

=== Naples operations ===
Weight continued her vital but unglamorous salvage routine at Naples well into April. Between 10 and 25 February, she assisted and repaired HMS Kempenfelt, the damaged minesweeper Pilot (AM-104), and LCI-3 as well as Weazel. On the 26th, she got underway for the beach off Bagnoli, Italy, to tow off stranded ships.

=== Collision during rescue attempt ===
Heavy seas and high winds proved a nemesis to the salvors. Shortly after 2000 on 26 February, Weight attempted to pass a line to a grounded U.S. Army tug, but in the initial attempt to do so, used up three spools of line. The second try ended also in failure when the boat went too close to shore and broached, pitching two men into the surf. Fortunately, all of the six men from Weight's motor launch reached shore safely, but the boat itself was smashed by the heavy surf.

Weight again attempted to tow off the Army tug, alone on the next day and in company with HMS Barholm on the 28th. Nevertheless, even after the joint attempt, the Army tug remained hard aground and defied all of the salvors' efforts, and the American salvage vessel subsequently returned to Naples to resume work on Pilot.

=== Putting out fires on burning ships ===
In early March, Weight salvaged HMS Boxer and HMS Quantock, and fought a fire that broke out on a nearby wreck. In the latter operation, the salvors had to cut holes in the deck to pass hoses. Late on 30 March coal gas ignited on board SS Richard Stockton, causing a serious fire and injuries to three men. Weight got underway at 2220 and went to the aid of the burning merchantman.

Weight moved in close and brought her hoses to bear, using them to cool the side plates of the cargo vessel. She also took on board three injured men from Richard Stockton and later transferred them to an Army hospital ashore. At 0430 on 31 March, Weight labored to beach the stricken merchantman to help extinguish the fires by flooding the forward section of the blazing ship. Weight resumed fighting the fires at 0630 and, by 1356, finally had the blaze "under control." After continuing salvage operations and unbeaching the ship, Weight returned to Naples on 1 April.

=== Reassignment to North Africa ===
Following a month of local salvage operations there, Weight departed Naples at 1139 on 1 May, in company with SS Carillo and SC-56l, and headed for the coast of Morocco. She arrived at Algiers on 4 May and, the next day, entered drydock at Oran for repairs to her hull and propellers.

Shortly after noon on 29 May, Weight sailed in company with Convoy KMS 51. Steaming as last ship in the second column of the convoy, Weight received orders at 2310 on 30 May to make smoke. Shortly thereafter, she observed sporadic antiaircraft fire up ahead and at 2320 went to general quarters. At 0012 on the 31st, the convoy ceased making smoke; but, two minutes later, a white flare appeared overhead and brought the ship back to general quarters. An ensuing brief period of uneasy quiet was suddenly broken at 0020 by numerous flares (both red and white) which began dotting the sky above and began drifting down, illuminating the waters below.

=== Convoy hit by Luftwaffe torpedo planes ===
The torpedo planes (probably Junkers Ju 88s) succeeded in hitting two ships. At 0030, Weight intercepted a radio dispatch reporting that two ships had been torpedoed and that survivors from one were already in the water. Weight immediately altered course, initiating a search for the men.

==== Rescuing survivors in the water ====
At 0037, the salvage vessel sighted some survivors and proceeded into the midst of them, commencing rescue operations. After four survivors had been hauled from the water, lookouts heard a plane approaching the ship from her starboard quarter. When the target became visible approximately 300 yards (270 m) away, two 20-millimeter guns immediately swung around and commenced firing. Weight's heavy antiaircraft barrage managed to dissuade the German pilot from attempting a strafing run on the survivors; and the plane, sans torpedo, swung away from the convoy. Soon thereafter, a second Ju 88 attacked, dropping a torpedo nearby that passed ahead of the rescue ship. Weight's Oerlikons again forced the Germans to clear the area.

Although the area was still brightly lighted by numerous flares, Weight continued rescue operations, picking up four more men from the water. Soon the British tug HMRT Nenquist neared the salvage vessel and informed her that she would pick up the rest of the survivors. Weight learned that the men she had rescued were from the British merchantman SS Nordeflinge which had taken an aerial torpedo amidships and gone down in two minutes.

After giving the survivors medical care, food, and clothing, Weight transferred the eight to the British Flower-class corvette HMS Hyderabad.

=== Return to Italian operations ===
Soon after reaching Augusta, Sicily, on the morning of 3 June, Weight shifted to Naples, reaching that port on the 5th. She spent a month engaged in local ship repair and salvage jobs and then shifted briefly to Palermo, Sicily, before returning to Naples, where she operated into early August.

=== Invasion of Southern France operations ===
Departing Naples on 5 August, Weight reached the Bay of Ajaccio, Corsica, late on the 6th. During the ensuing weeks, the salvage vessel supported the invasion of southern France, earning her second battle star performing her vital but unsung salvage and repair deeds on ships ranging from landing craft to patrol vessels. She remained at Corsica for much of August, before she towed LST-690 to Palermo, en route to Naples. Reaching that port on 1 September, in company with PC-1594 and PC-1596, Weight departed Naples on 6 September.

Arriving at St. Tropez on the 9th, the salvage vessel shifted to Toulon, France, on the 13th, arriving the next day. There, she commenced salvage operations on the sunken French "super-destroyer" Vauban on the 14th and continued them for a fortnight, moored astern of the sunken ship. After a brief trip to Dellys, Algeria, Weight returned to Toulon, where she performed salvage and repair operations on the mine-damaged SS Eleanor Wylie over ensuing days.

Departing Toulon at the end of October, the salvage vessel shifted to Marseille before moving down to Oran and Mers el-Kebir. She returned briefly to the Bay of Ajaccio, Corsica, before she put into Livorno, Italy, to unload salvage gear there. Returning briefly to Naples and then to Arzew, Algeria, Weight departed Oran on 27 January 1945 and headed home.

=== Homeward bound ===
She overtook Convoy GUS-68 on the 29th. The ship arrived at Fayal, Horta, in the Azores, on 4 February and over the next two weeks' time, performed salvage operations on the damaged destroyer escort Fogg (DE-57). She ultimately departed the Azores on the 23d bound for Boston, Massachusetts.

=== Assigned to the Pacific Fleet ===
Following an overhaul at Norfolk, Virginia, Weight sailed for the Pacific Ocean on 7 May. She then operated out of San Francisco, California, and Pearl Harbor through the end of hostilities with Japan in mid-August 1945.

== Post-war decommissioning ==
Ultimately decommissioned at the Mare Island Naval Shipyard, Vallejo, California, on 29 March 1946, Weight was struck from the Navy list on 1 May. Subsequently, transferred to the United States Maritime Commission, the ship was sold and, on 24 July 1947, was delivered to her purchaser, Mr. David Davidoff, at Suisun Bay, California.

== Military awards and honors ==
Weight won two battle stars for her World War II service. Her crew was eligible for the following medals and ribbons:

- Combat Action Ribbon (retroactive)
- American Campaign Medal
- European-African-Middle Eastern Campaign Medal (2)
- World War II Victory Medal
