= USS Anchor =

History

United States
- Name: USS Anchor
- Builder: Colberg Boat Works, Stockton, California
- Laid down: 30 April 1942
- Launched: 13 March 1943
- Commissioned: 23 October 1943
- Decommissioned: 16 September 1946
- Stricken: 13 November 1946
- Honors and awards: 1 battle star
- Fate: Sold, 23 May 1947; most likely scrapped

General characteristics
- Class & type: Anchor-class rescue and salvage ship
- Displacement: 1,615 long tons (1,641 t)
- Length: 183 ft 3 in (55.85 m)
- Beam: 37 ft (11 m)
- Draft: 14 ft 8 in (4.47 m)
- Propulsion: Diesel, single propeller
- Speed: 12 knots (22 km/h; 14 mph)
- Complement: 65
- Armament: 1 × single 3"/50 caliber gun; 4 × single 20 mm guns

USS Anchor (ARS-13) was an Anchor-class rescue and salvage ship commissioned by the U.S. Navy during World War II. Her task was to come to the aid of stricken vessels.

Anchor (ARS-13) was laid down on 30 April 1942 at Stockton, California, by the Colberg Boat Works; launched on 13 March 1943; sponsored by Mrs. Hattie M. Stevenson; and placed in commission at Stockton, California, on 23 October 1943.

== World War II service ==
During November, the salvage ship was fitted out at Stockton and at San Francisco, California. Early in December, she sailed to San Diego, California, for shakedown training and salvage operations. Anchor left the U.S. West Coast soon after the beginning of 1944, bound for Hawaii. Upon her arrival at Pearl Harbor on the 11th, she underwent a month of repair work and then was assigned to "ready duty," which involved standing by the entrance buoys to the Pearl Harbor channel and giving assistance when necessary to passing vessels. The ship also conducted torpedo recovery duty.

=== South Pacific operations ===
On 16 July, Anchor departed Pearl Harbor and sailed for Eniwetok. She operated there during August, carrying out various duties such as recovering barges, delivering mail, transporting freight and passengers, and performing salvage operations. The ship steamed to Saipan in early September and assumed duty as blasting control vessel in addition to her salvage work. On 4 November she left Saipan and sailed via Eniwetok back to Hawaii.

=== Salvage and recovery operations ===
She reached Pearl Harbor on 21 November and entered a shipyard for repairs and alterations. Anchor left the yard on 7 February 1945 and shortly thereafter sailed for Eniwetok. She arrived there on 15 March and resumed salvage and towing operations. During that stint at Eniwetok, the ship conducted salvage operations on the merchant ship SS Esso Washington. She moved to Guam in early May and, after a brief availability, began torpedo recovery service. Later that month, the vessel got underway for Okinawa and arrived there on 9 June.

=== Under attack by Japanese aircraft ===
During the next seven months, the ship conducted salvage operations on sunken Japanese shipping and served as a blasting control and air raid control ship for the Okinawa area. On 11 June, she was among several ships that opened fire on four enemy planes attacking Allied ships in the Anchorage. The combined fire shot down one raider.

=== End-of-war operations ===
The war in the Pacific Ocean ended when the Japanese capitulated on 15 August, but Anchor continued to operate at Okinawa until 23 March for a cruise that would take her to Guam, Peleliu, and back to Guam. The salvage vessel left the latter port and set sail for Pearl Harbor on 18 June. She remained in port for four weeks and then got underway for the west coast of the United States.

== Return to Stateside ==
Anchor reached Seattle, Washington, in early July. Shortly thereafter, she reversed her course and proceeded back to Pearl Harbor. After a brief stay there, the ship sailed back to the west coast. She touched at San Francisco on 26 July before sailing on to Seattle, Washington.

== Inactivation and decommissioning ==
There, preparations were begun to deactivate the ship. Anchor was decommissioned at Seattle on 16 September 1946, and her name was struck from the Navy list on 13 November 1946. The vessel was then transferred to the Maritime Administration. She was sold on 23 May 1947 to L. E. Castell, Seattle, Washington.

== Military awards and honors ==
Anchor earned one battle star for her World War II service.
