= USS Protector (ARS-14) =

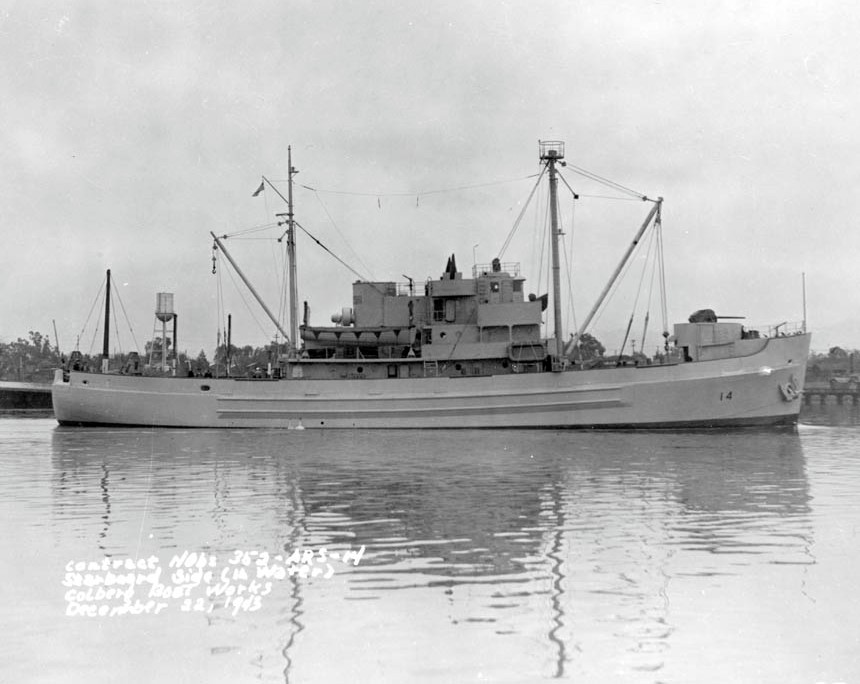

History

United States
- Builder: Colberg Boat Works
- Laid down: 30 April 1942
- Launched: 27 April 1943
- Commissioned: 28 December 1943
- Decommissioned: 15 May 1946
- Stricken: 8 October 1946
- Fate: Sold, 16 December 1946

General characteristics
- Displacement: 1,650 tons
- Length: 213 ft 6 in (65.07 m)
- Beam: 39 ft (12 m)
- Draught: 14 ft 8 in (4.47 m)
- Propulsion: diesel-electric, twin screws, 2,780 hp (2,070 kW)
- Speed: 15 knots
- Complement: 65
- Armament: one single 3 in (76 mm) gun mount

USS Protector (ARS-14) was a Diver-class rescue and salvage ship commissioned by the U.S. Navy during World War II. Her task was to come to the aid of stricken vessels.

Protector (ARS-14) was laid down by Colberg Boat Works, Stockton, California, 30 April 1942, launched 27 April 1943 sponsored by Mrs. F. S. M. Harris, and commissioned 28 December 1943.

== World War II service ==
After training and conducting salvage operations off the U.S. West Coast, Protector sailed from Seattle, Washington, for Alaskan waters, arriving 25 June. Attached to the Alaskan Sea Frontier Protector performed salvage and diving operations at various Alaskan stations until April 1945. She then returned to California, whence she sailed for the Marshalls, arriving at Eniwetok Atoll 2 August.

Protector was engaged in salvage of a sunken aircraft off Parry Island until 15 September when she sailed for Yokosuka, arriving 26 September. She conducted salvage operations at Yokosuka until 11 November, then assisted SS Drecel Victory, aground in the vicinity of Fort No.2, Tokyo Bay.

On 7 January 1946, Protector departed Yokosuka, sailing via Pearl Harbor to San Francisco as escort and tow for USS Seekonk (AOG-20).

== Post-war decommissioning ==
On 24 February 1946 she arrived at San Francisco, California, where she decommissioned 15 May. She was struck from the List of Navy Vessels 8 October 1946, transferred to the Maritime Commission; and sold 30 December 1946 to Mr. Glen R. Butt of Cambridge, Massachusetts. She was later resold, in 1952, to Pakistani interests. Her current fate is unknown.
