= USS Extractor =

1943 Anchor-class rescue and salvage ship

History

United States
- Name: USS Extractor
- Builder: Colberg Boat Works, Stockton, California
- Launched: 15 June 1943
- Commissioned: 3 March 1944
- Fate: Torpedoed and sunk, 24 January 1945

General characteristics
- Type: Anchor-class rescue and salvage ship
- Displacement: 1,089 long tons (1,106 t)
- Length: 183 ft 3 in (55.85 m)
- Beam: 37 ft (11 m)
- Draft: 14 ft 8 in (4.47 m)
- Speed: 12 knots (22 km/h; 14 mph)
- Complement: 65 officers and enlisted
- Armament: 1 × 3-inch/50-caliber gun; 2 × 20 mm guns

USS Extractor ARS-15 was an Anchor-class rescue and salvage ship of the United States Navy in World War II.

Extractor was launched by Colberg Boat Works, Stockton, California, on 15 June 1943 (sponsored by Mrs. Lowden Jessup), and commissioned on 3 March 1944.

== Service history ==
Extractor sailed from San Francisco on 8 May 1944 en route to Eniwetok where she reported to Commander Service Squadron 2 (ServRon 2) for salvage and rescue duty. During the summer of 1944 she executed repairs, diving, and towing as well as salvage operations from Pearl Harbor to Eniwetok and Ulithi. On 20 November while at Ulithi she fought futilely against fire on board USS Mississinewa (AO-59) which capsized and sank.

=== Friendly fire incident ===
On 3 December 1944 she steamed to Guam, reporting for duty with Service Squadron 12 (ServRon 12), with which she served until 21 January 1945 when she departed unescorted for the Philippine area. She was underway on the morning of 24 January when, through mistaken identification by USS Guardfish, the latter fired a torpedo which struck Extractor's starboard side. The salvage ship capsized and sank at 15°44′N 135°29′E, within five minutes. Six sailors were killed.
