= USS Embattle (AM-434) =

Aggressive-class minesweeper

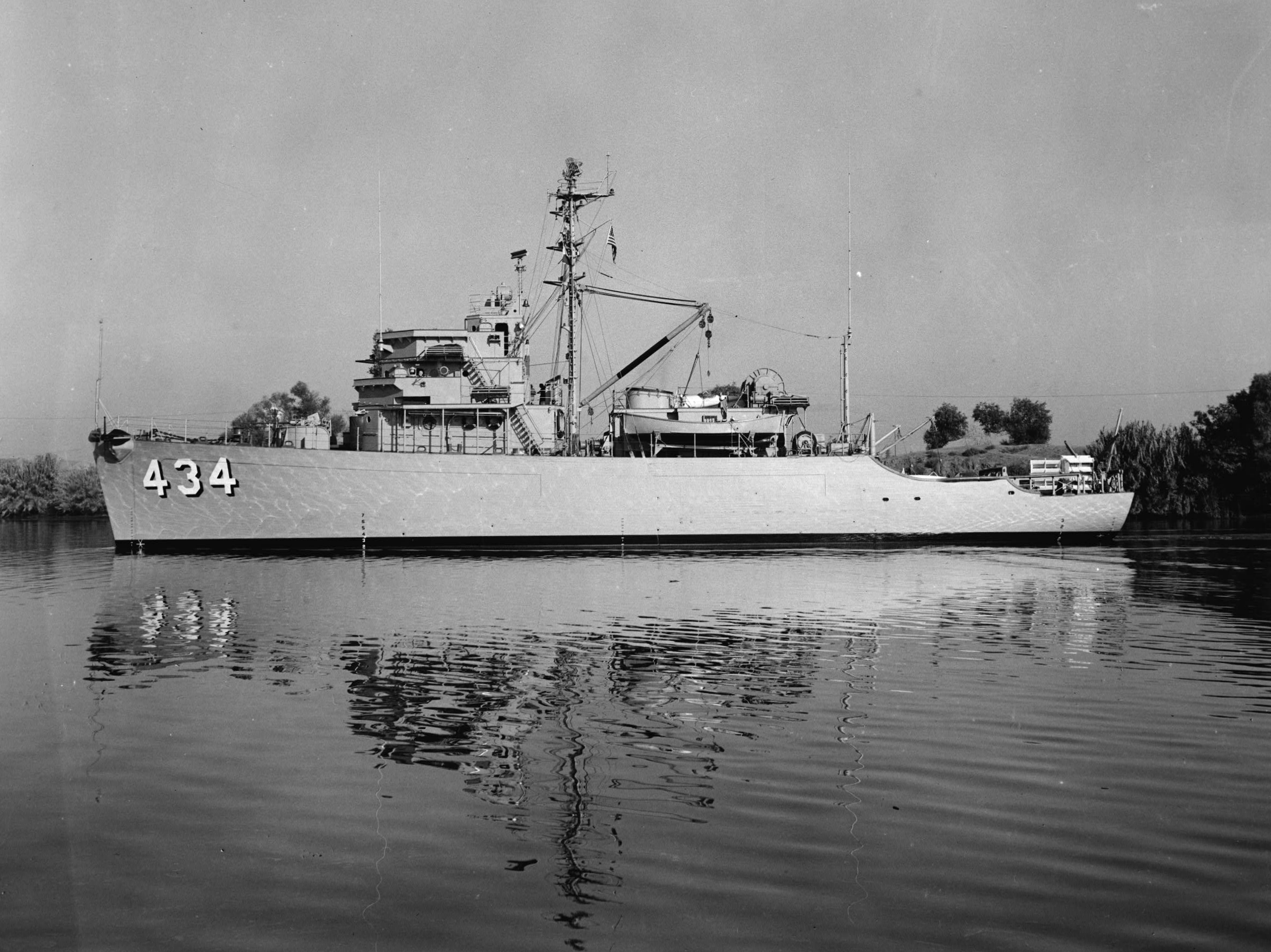

History

United States
- Name: USS Embattle
- Builder: Colberg Boat Works
- Laid down: 14 November 1951
- Launched: 27 August 1953
- Commissioned: 16 November 1954
- Decommissioned: 1972
- Stricken: 15 May 1976
- Home port: Long Beach, California
- Fate: Scrapped, 11 January 1976

General characteristics
- Displacement: 620 tons
- Length: 172 ft (52 m)
- Beam: 36 ft (11 m)
- Draught: 10 ft (3.0 m)
- Speed: 18 knots flank, 15 sustained
- Complement: 74 Enlisted, 6 Officers
- Armament: one 40 mm mount (later changed to one 20 mm mount, two .50 cal (12.7 mm) machine guns, two .30 cal (7.62 mm) machine guns

USS Embattle (AM-434/MSO-434) was an Agile-class minesweeper acquired by the U.S. Navy for the task of removing mines that had been placed in the water to prevent the safe passage of ships.

The second ship to be named Embattle by the Navy, AM-434 was launched 27 August 1953 by Colberg Boat Works, Stockton, California; sponsored by Mrs. S. R. Towne; and commissioned 16 November 1954. She was reclassified MSO-434, 7 February 1955.

== West Coast operations ==
Since commissioning Embattle has served with Mine Forces, Pacific Fleet, engaged in type training and exercises along the U.S. West Coast from her home port of Long Beach, California.

From May to November 1956, and from November 1958 to May 1959, she cruised to the Far East for exercises with the U.S. 7th Fleet and called at various Japanese ports, Taiwan, Hong Kong, Thailand, and the Philippines.

From May 1959 through the end of 1960 Embattle cruised the U.S. West Coast, training and maintaining her readiness at the traditionally high Navy level.

Deployed to the Western Pacific in 1969, she remained active with the 7th Fleet until 2 May 1970 when she returned to the U.S. West Coast. Upon returning "Embattle" was designated a Reserve training ship homeported in Long Beach, CA.

== Decommissioning ==
Embattle was decommissioned in September 1972. She was struck from the Navy list on 15 May 1976, and was sold for scrapping on 11 January 1976.
