= USS YMS-386 =

Minesweeper of the United States Navy

History

United States
- Name: USS YMS-386
- Builder: Colberg Boat Works; Stockton, California
- Launched: 23 March 1943
- Commissioned: 23 July 1943
- Decommissioned: 27 May 1946
- Stricken: 3 July 1946
- Fate: Sold; ultimate fate unknown

General characteristics
- Class & type: YMS-135 subclass of YMS-1-class minesweepers
- Displacement: 270 t
- Length: 136 ft (41 m)
- Beam: 24 ft 6 in (7.47 m)
- Draft: 8 ft (2.4 m)
- Propulsion: 2 × 880 bhp General Motors 8-268A diesel engines; 2 shafts
- Speed: 15 knots (28 km/h)
- Complement: 32
- Armament: 1 × 3"/50 caliber gun mount; 2 × 20 mm guns; 2 × depth charge projectors

USS YMS-386 was a U.S. Navy World War II Type 1 Class Auxiliary Motor Minesweeper. On 6 October 1942 her hull was laid down at the Colberg Boat Works of Stockton, California. During World War II, the Colberg Boat Works, constructed a number of vessels under contract with the U.S. Navy. She was launched on 23 March 1943 and commissioned on 23 July.

YMS-386 carried a total complement of 32, four officers and 28 crew. She had a displacement of 270 tons, a length of 136 feet, a beam of 24 feet 6 inches and a draft of 8 feet. Powered by two 880shp General Motors 8-268A diesel engines and two shafts, with a maximum speed of 15 knots. Her armament included one single 3"/50 foredeck gun mount, two Oerlikon 20mm single barrel AA guns, one port and one starboard, mounted aft of the pilot house and two DCP's (Depth Charge Projectors).

In June 1945, YMS-386 departed Pearl Harbor with a minesweeper convoy engaging in live-fire exercises en route to Johnson Island. From Johnson Island YMS-386 again departed with other minesweeper craft to participate in mine craft sweeping operations off the coast of Okinawa Japan. En route to Okinawa, an electrical fire caused enough damage to force YMS-386 to change course to Guam for approximately two weeks for repairs. While sweeping coastal waters off of Okinawa on 6 August, the first atomic bomb was dropped on the city of Hiroshima.

After the formal Japanese surrender on 2 September, YMS-386 continued sweeping duties of post-war Japanese harbors. While at port at Buckner Bay Okinawa, at 0430 on 4 October she received urgent orders to get underway to sail around the southern tip of Okinawa into the Sea of China and proceed 80 nautical miles to Unton Ko at the north end of the island. She sailed into mountainous swells and wind driven seas with other vessels attempting to escape the oncoming typhoon. At one point in the midst of a violent 58% roll, she escaped a near fantail collision with YMS-384. After 13 hours, YMS-386 was only four of 13 ships to successfully complete the journey to Unton Ko. This event became known Typhoon Louise of 4–10 October, eventually causing substantial loss of life and loss of ships. She set sail for Osaka Wan and Yokaichi Bay in Osaka to continue sweeping operations in Japanese waters until December 1945.

(Excerpts from the Journal of Gunners Mate 1st Class Clifford E. Medley, USS YMS-386, June 1945-December 1945)

== Disposal ==
On 27 May 1946 YMS-386 was sold and struck from the Naval Register on 3 July. Her fate is unknown.
