= USS Rescuer =

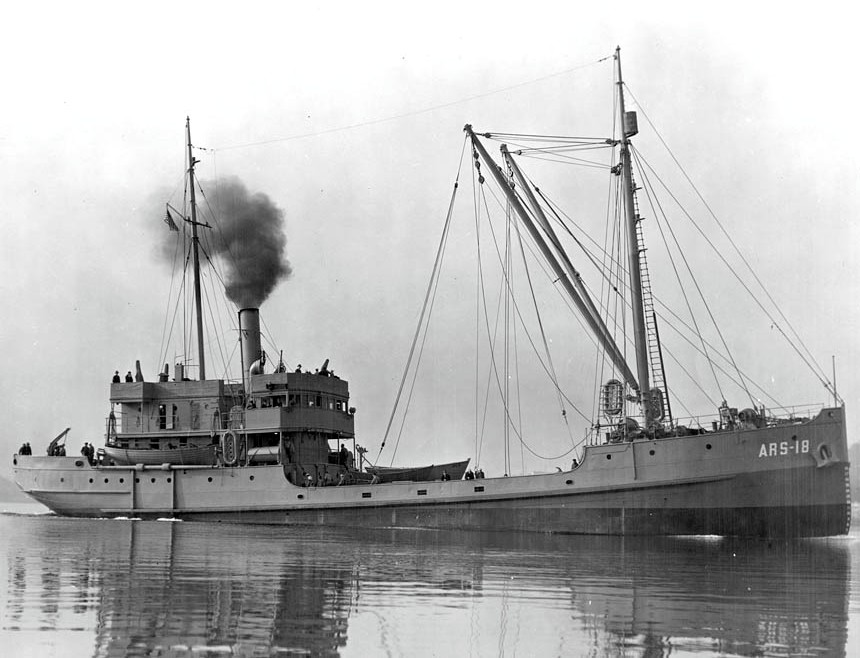

History

United States
- Laid down: date unknown
- Launched: 1904
- Acquired: 6 February 1942
- Commissioned: 31 December 1942
- Stricken: 22 December 1944
- Fate: Wrecked 31 December 1942; later scrapped

General characteristics
- Displacement: 738 tons
- Length: 175 ft 6 in (53.49 m)
- Beam: 34 ft (10 m)
- Speed: 10 knots
- Armament: Armament four .30 cal. machine guns

USS Rescuer (ARS-18) was a Rescuer-class rescue and salvage ship commissioned by the U.S. Navy during World War II. Her task was to come to the aid of stricken vessels.

== Construction and commissioning ==
Rescuer (ARS-18) was built in 1904 as tug Casper by United Engine Works, and acquired for the Navy 6 February 1942 by the Port Director, San Pedro, California.

== Service history ==
Assigned to the 13th Naval District on 7 February 1942, Rescuer underwent conversion at Seattle, Washington, then headed north to the waters of the Territory of Alaska, where she served during her brief naval career.

On 31 December 1942, while engaged in salvaging the stranded Soviet cargo ship SS Turksib near Scotch Cap (54°24′15″N 164°47′30″W) on the southwest corner of Unimak Island in the Aleutian Islands, Rescuer was carried on to the beach in an 80-mph (129-km/h) gale, badly holed, and wrecked. Her third engineer fell overboard and drowned. Her name was struck from the Navy list on 22 December 1944.
