= USS Swivel =

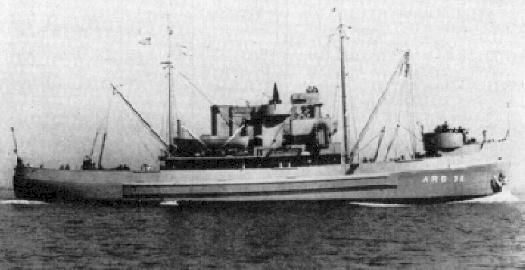

History

United States
- Ordered: as SS York Salvor (BARS-8)
- Laid down: 28 April 1942
- Launched: 6 May 1943
- Commissioned: 6 October 1943
- Decommissioned: 4 June 1946
- Stricken: 3 July 1946
- Fate: Sold for scrapping, 6 December 1946

General characteristics
- Displacement: 1,232t.(lt) 1,500 tons(fl)
- Length: 183 ft 3 in (55.85 m)
- Beam: 38 ft 2 in (11.63 m)
- Draught: 13 ft 11 in (4.24 m)
- Propulsion: diesel-electric, twin screws, 2,780hp
- Speed: 11.5 knots
- Complement: 65
- Armament: one single 3 in (76 mm) gun mount, two 20 mm guns

USS Swivel (ARS-36) was a Weight-class rescue and salvage ship acquired by the U.S. Navy during World War II. Her task was to come to the aid of stricken vessels.

Swivel, ex-BARS-8, ex-SS York Salvor, was laid down on 28 April 1942 by the American Car and Foundry Co., Wilmington, Delaware; launched on 6 May 1943; sponsored by Mrs. T. W. Goslin; and commissioned on 6 October 1943.

== World War II service ==
Swivel moved down the coast and held her shakedown in the Chesapeake Bay area. On 15 December 1943, the wooden-hulled salvage ship sailed in a convoy for Falmouth, England, via the Azores Islands. She arrived in the United Kingdom and operated there from 5 January to 25 June 1944.

=== Normandy invasion operations ===
Her primary duties consisted of towing and preparing small ships for the invasion of France. On 25 June, she crossed the channel to the Omaha Beach assault area and began clearing the beaches to expedite the landing of troops and supplies. This duty, including towing several ships back to England, continued until November.

=== Harbor-clearing duties ===
Swivel proceeded to Le Havre, France, on 12 November, and assisted in clearing that harbor. She moved to Cherbourg on 25 December 1944, helped clear the harbor, and assisted ships there until 27 June 1945. She returned to Le Havre on that date and engaged in clearing screws, inspecting underwater bottoms, and making temporary repairs until returning to the United States on 31 October 1945 for disposition.

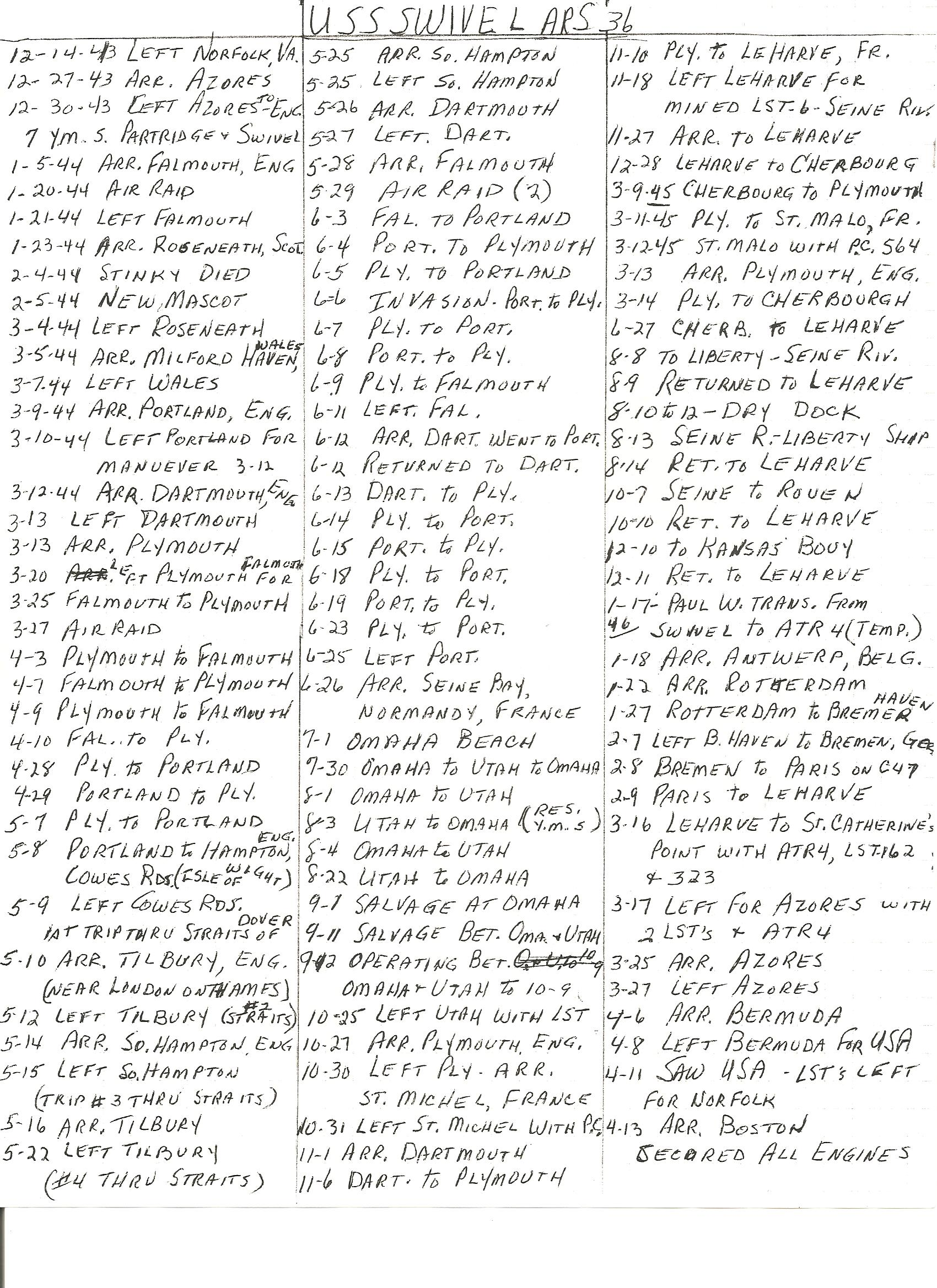
Handwritten log of Paul W.'s deployment on the USS Swivel during World War II. Paul W. began service on the Swivel in Norfolk VA and continued until being transferred in 1946. Note: the entry "Stinky Died" refers to their dog.

== Post-war decommissioning ==
On 13 April 1946, Swivel reported to the 1st Naval District; was inspected; and found beyond economical repair. A Board of Inspection and Survey found her surplus to Navy requirements and recommended that she be disposed of. Swivel was decommissioned on 4 June 1946 and struck from the Navy list on 3 July. She was sold to Mr. L. 0. Butts, West Newton, Massachusetts, on 6 December 1946 and scrapped.

== Military awards and honors ==
Swivel received one battle star for World War II service. Her crew was eligible for the following medals:

- American Campaign Medal
- European-African-Middle Eastern Campaign Medal (1)
- World War II Victory Medal
