= USS Restorer =

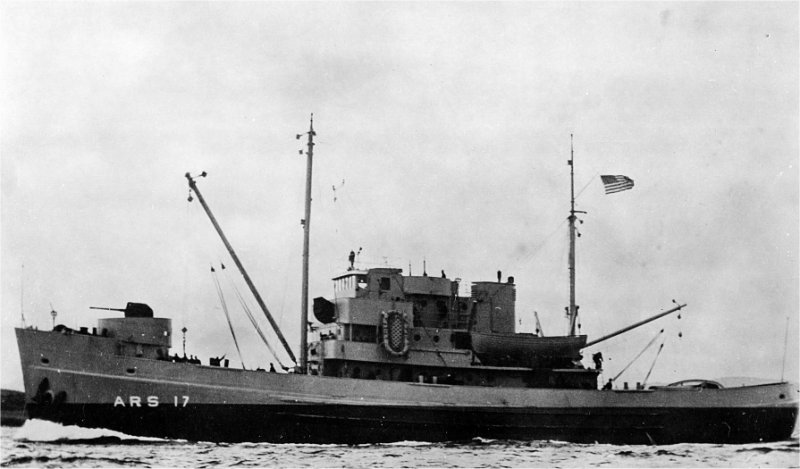

History

United States
- Name: USS Restorer
- Builder: Snow Shipyards Inc., Rockland, Maine
- Laid down: 25 March 1942
- Launched: 24 October 1942
- Commissioned: 6 October 1943
- Decommissioned: 6 March 1946
- Stricken: 19 July 1946
- Honors and awards: 2 battle stars
- Fate: Sold to Denmark, 27 February 1948; later scrapped

General characteristics
- Class & type: Anchor-class rescue and salvage ship
- Displacement: 1,089 long tons (1,106 t) light; 1,615 long tons (1,641 t) full
- Length: 183 ft 3 in (55.85 m)
- Beam: 37 ft (11 m)
- Draft: 14 ft 8 in (4.47 m)
- Propulsion: diesel-electric, twin screws, 2,780 hp (2,073 kW)
- Speed: 15 knots (28 km/h; 17 mph)
- Complement: 65
- Armament: 1 × 3"/50 caliber gun; 2 × 20 mm guns

USS Restorer (ARS-17) was an Anchor-class rescue and salvage ship commissioned by the U.S. Navy during World War II. Her task was to come to the aid of stricken vessels.

Restorer (ARS-17) was laid down by Snow Shipyards, Inc., Rockland, Maine, 25 March 1942; launched 24 October 1942; sponsored by Mrs. Jessica C. Moore; and commissioned 6 October 1943.

== World War II service ==
Following shakedown off the U.S. East Coast, Restorer joined a convoy en route to North Africa, mooring at Mers-el-Kebir 22 December. She moved to Algiers on the 31st where, despite several air raids, she assisted in salvage and fire-fighting on Thomas Stone (AP-59).

=== Italy and North Africa operations ===
Restorer got underway 21 February 1944 for Naples, Italy, whence she escorted an LST convoy to Anzio. Arriving off the assault area 28 February, she relieved Hopi (ATF-71) as senior salvage vessel and through March was engaged in various salvage and fire-fighting operations. Undamaged by occasional shellfire, bombs, and aerial torpedo attacks, she got underway 14 April for Naples; and, after salvage work on SS James Guthrie, she continued on back to North Africa. She remained in various Algerian ports from 18 May to 6 July, then got underway for Naples again. At the end of the month she destroyed the sunken hulk of Portent (AM-106) off Anzio. The navigator was Grover H. Roberson of Stokes, N.C. Mr. Roberson had just been recently reassigned by the US Navy to the Rockland Naval Shipyard, Rockland, Maine to assist in the shakedown cruise for the USS Restorer. Once the Restorer was commissioned, Mr. Roberson was reassigned to the U.S. Naval Shipyard at Boston, MA. before he shipped out to Algeria. The Restorer saw action when she came to Anzio, Italy, at the Battle of Anzio, to attend to the then sunken U.S.S. Swerve. At the conclusion of the Battle of Anzio, Mr. Roberson was honored to travel to Rome, with other naval officers and appear in an audience with Pope Pius XII at the Vatican.

=== Attending to USS Swerve ===
Restorer spent most of August in the Gulf of Calvi, Corsica. Then in September she proceeded to southern France, spending the last of the month in harbor clearance work in Marseille. Most of October and all of November were devoted to work as salvage and fire-fighting ship at Marseille. Back in Algeria for December, she returned to Marseille in January 1945 to continue harbor clearance which lasted through February. Returning to Italy, she conducted salvage operations and demolition work on the sunken Swerve (AM-121) off Naples during March, then next steamed back to Algeria, whence she got underway for the United States on 7 April. She reached Charleston, South Carolina, on 19 May.

=== End-of-war operations ===
On 22 July Restorer departed the southeastern coast for Newfoundland and was at Argentia when the war ended. On 1 September she departed Argentia for Bermuda, her base until 10 January 1946. She then got underway for New York with a tow. Arriving on the 14th she moored at Tompkinsville, where she remained until decommissioned 6 March 1946.

== Post-war decommissioning ==
Struck from the Navy list 19 July 1946, she was transferred to War Shipping Administration, 22 April 1947 and sold to Denmark. She was commissioned as a Royal Danish Naval Vessel on 27 February 1948 at New Orleans, Louisiana, and named Vitus Bering.

The Danish Navy operated her in 1948 and 1949 as a patrol vessel in Greenland waters, preferring wooden hulls in the cold conditions. The vessel was found to be unsuitable, however, due to numerous leaks and the corrosion problems associated with diesel-electric drives in a salt water environment. The vessel was retired from Danish Naval service in 1949 and scrapped.

== Military awards and honors ==
Restorer earned two battle stars for World War II service:

- West Coast of Italy operations (Anzio-Nuttuno, 28 February to 1 March 1944)
- Invasion of Southern France (September 1944)

Her crew was eligible for the following medals:

- American Campaign Medal
- European-African-Middle Eastern Campaign Medal (2)
- World War II Victory Medal
