= SS Samuel Huntington =

American liberty ship in WWII

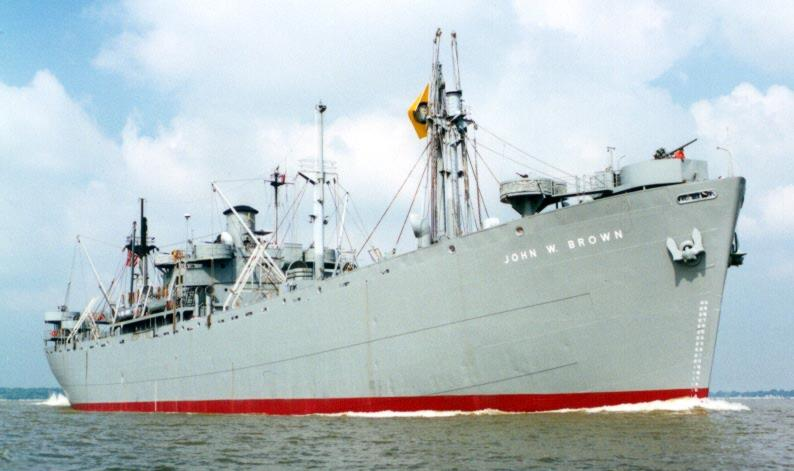
- Samuel Huntington was a standard liberty ship, similar to SS John W. Brown, seen here.

History

United States
- Name: Samuel Huntington
- Namesake: Samuel Huntington
- Owner: United States Maritime Commission
- Operator: Oliver J. Olson & Company., San Francisco, California
- Builder: Permanente Metals Corp.
- Yard number: No. 2; Richmond, California
- Way number: 4
- Laid down: 20 January 1942
- Launched: 26 April 1942
- Completed: 18 May 1942
- Identification: MC Hull #248
- Fate: Bombed and sunk off Anzio, 29 January 1944

General characteristics
- Class & type: Liberty ship; type EC2-S-C1, standard
- Tonnage: 7,181 GRT
- Length: 441 feet 6 inches (135 m) oa; 416 feet (127 m) pp; 427 feet (130 m) lwl
- Beam: 57 feet (17 m)
- Draft: 27 ft 9.25 in (8.4646 m)
- Propulsion: 1 × triple-expansion steam engine, 1 × screw propeller
- Speed: 11.5 knots (21.3 km/h; 13.2 mph)
- Capacity: 562,608 cubic feet (15,931 m^{3}) (grain); 499,573 cubic feet (14,146 m^{3}) (bale)
- Troops: 350; 504 POWs
- Complement: 38–62 USMM; 21–40 USNAG
- Armament: Varied by ship; Bow-mounted 3-inch (76 mm)/50-caliber gun; Stern-mounted 4-inch (102 mm)/50-caliber gun; 2–8 × single 20-millimeter (0.79 in) Oerlikon anti-aircraft (AA) cannons and/or, 2–8 × 37-millimeter (1.46 in) M1 AA guns

SS Samuel Huntington was an American liberty ship during World War II. She was the 248th liberty ship authorized by the United States Maritime Commission and was named in honor of Samuel Huntington, a Founding Father and signer of the American Declaration of Independence. SS Samuel Huntington was launched in 1942 and sailed to ports in the Pacific, South America, Africa, and the United Kingdom. She was one of a select group of liberty ships that were outfitted to carry a limited number of either troops or prisoners of war. As part of a convoy to resupply the Allied troops at Anzio, she sank after a successful German bomb attack in January 1944.

== Construction ==
Samuel Huntington was laid down on 20 January 1942 by Permanente Metals Corp. on ship way number four at their No. 2 Yard in Richmond, California. She was the 248th liberty ship authorized by the United States Maritime Commission and the 48th ship begun at the ship yard. The Huntington—a type EC2-S-C1, or standard, liberty ship—was launched on 26 April, and delivered on 18 May. She was completed in 118 days, spending 96 on the ways and 22 on the water before delivery. She was one of about 220 liberty ships, about one out of every 10 made, that were outfitted to carry a limited number of either troops or prisoners of war. Sources are not clear when the passenger capability was added to Samuel Huntington, but modifications of this sort were made after November 1942.

== Service history ==
Ten days after her delivery, Samuel Huntington departed San Francisco for Los Angeles. Sailing from that port on 31 May 1942, she arrived at Suva in the Fiji Islands on 19 June. After the Huntington made her way to Lautoka, she departed there on 6 July for Chile. After arriving at Antofagasta on 29 July, the cargo ship worked her way up and down the South American coast, calling at Iquique on 30 July, Valparaíso on 7 August, and Punta Arenas on 13 August. Sailing from Punta Arenas the next day, she navigated the Straits of Magellan, crossed the South Atlantic, and arrived at Cape Town, South Africa, on 2 September.

Sailing from Cape Town on 6 September, Samuel Huntington sailed around the African continent, calling at Durban on 10 September, and arriving at Aden, on the Arabian Peninsula, in mid September. Departing there on 24 September, the Huntington sailed up the Red Sea, calling at Massaua on the Eritrean coast on 26 September and Suez on 1 October. Departing Suez on 12 October, she retraced her track around Africa, calling at Port Sudan on 18 October, Durban on 2 November, Cape Town on 7 November. Leaving the same day, she crossed the South Atlantic and headed for Paramaribo, Suriname.

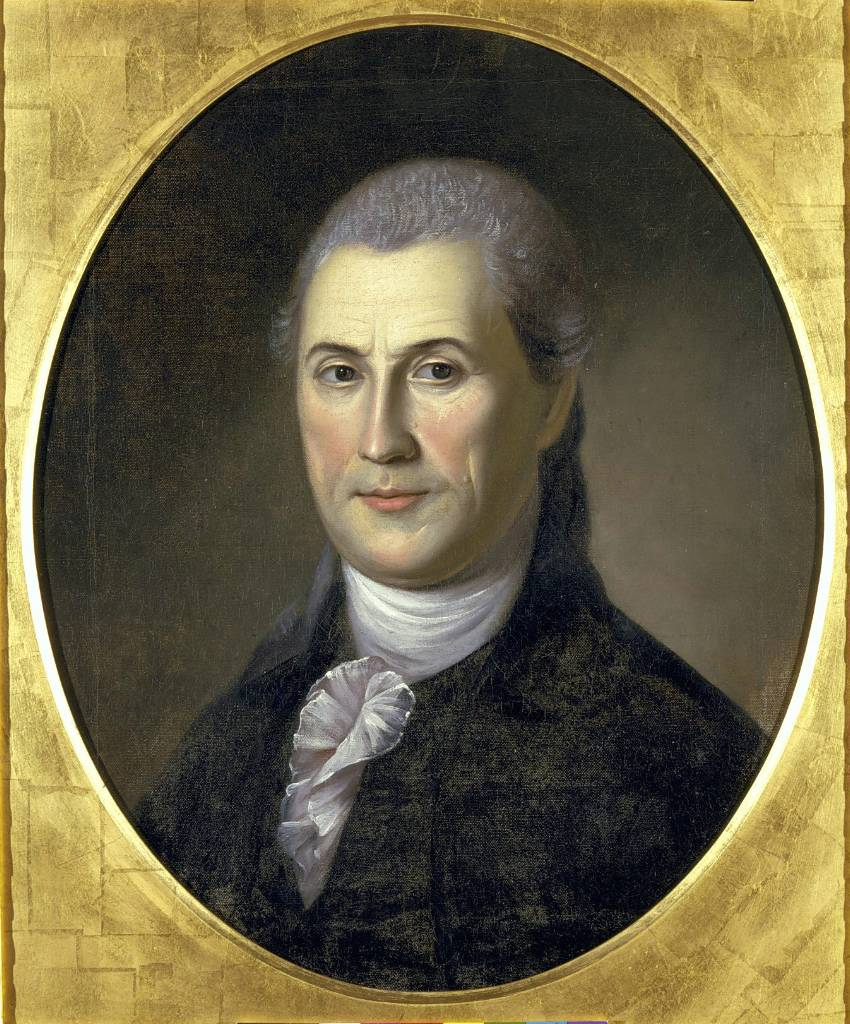
Samuel Huntington, the namesake of SS Samuel Huntington

Samuel Huntington arrived at Paramaribo on 27 November, and sailed three days later for Trinidad. After arriving at that Caribbean port on 1 December, the Huntington waited for a week before sailing in convoy TAG-27 to Guantanamo Bay with 12 other ships. After arriving at Guantanamo Bay on 12 December, the convoy, dropping four ships, reformed as convoy GN.27 headed for New York City and departed the same day. The Huntington, calling at a U.S. port for the first time in seven months, arrived at New York on 19 December.

The Huntington departed New York as a part of Convoy SC-118 headed for Liverpool via Halifax on 24 January. As the convoy, which consisted of 60 ships and 26 escorts, sailed near Iceland, a wolf pack of Kriegsmarine U-boats attacked the convoy repeatedly over a four-day period. Some 20 U-boats participated, sinking 12 Allied ships, including Henry R. Mallory, a troop transport that went down with 272 men—more than half of her passengers and crew; three U-boats were lost. Samuel Huntington departed the convoy and arrived at Clyde on 11 February.

After calling at Belfast Lough in early April, Samuel Huntington made her way to Liverpool to join Convoy ON 181 to New York. Departing on 30 April as one of 48 merchant ships in the convoy, the liberty ship made port at New York on 17 May. The convoy reported no submarine activity, and about two-thirds of the convoy were able to take target practice on icebergs during the voyage.

Samuel Huntington next departed New York on 13 June for Oran as a part of Convoy UGS-10. Joining 74 other merchant ships and their 28 escorts, the Huntington made it safely to Oran on 5 July; another ship in the convoy was sunk by a U-boat. During her participation in Operation Husky, the Allied invasion of Sicily, the Huntington and fellow liberty ships William W. Gerhard and William Mulholland all suffered casualties from an air attack on 1 August at Palermo. Damage to the ship was apparently minor enough that she was ready to sail nine days later, when she joined Convoy GUS-12—which had originated in Alexandria and was destined for Hampton Roads, Virginia—to return to the United States. Samuel Huntington left the convoy as it neared the U.S. east coast, and headed for New York, arriving there on 5 September.

After making her way to Hampton Roads, Samuel Huntington departed for Casablanca on 5 October as part of Convoy UGS-20, where she arrived on 21 October. Eight days later, she joined Convoy GUS-19—a 110-ship Alexandria–Hampton Roads convoy—and headed for home. She arrived in Baltimore on 16 November. Shifting to Hampton Roads in early December, Samuel Huntington prepared to depart on what would be her last sailing from the United States.

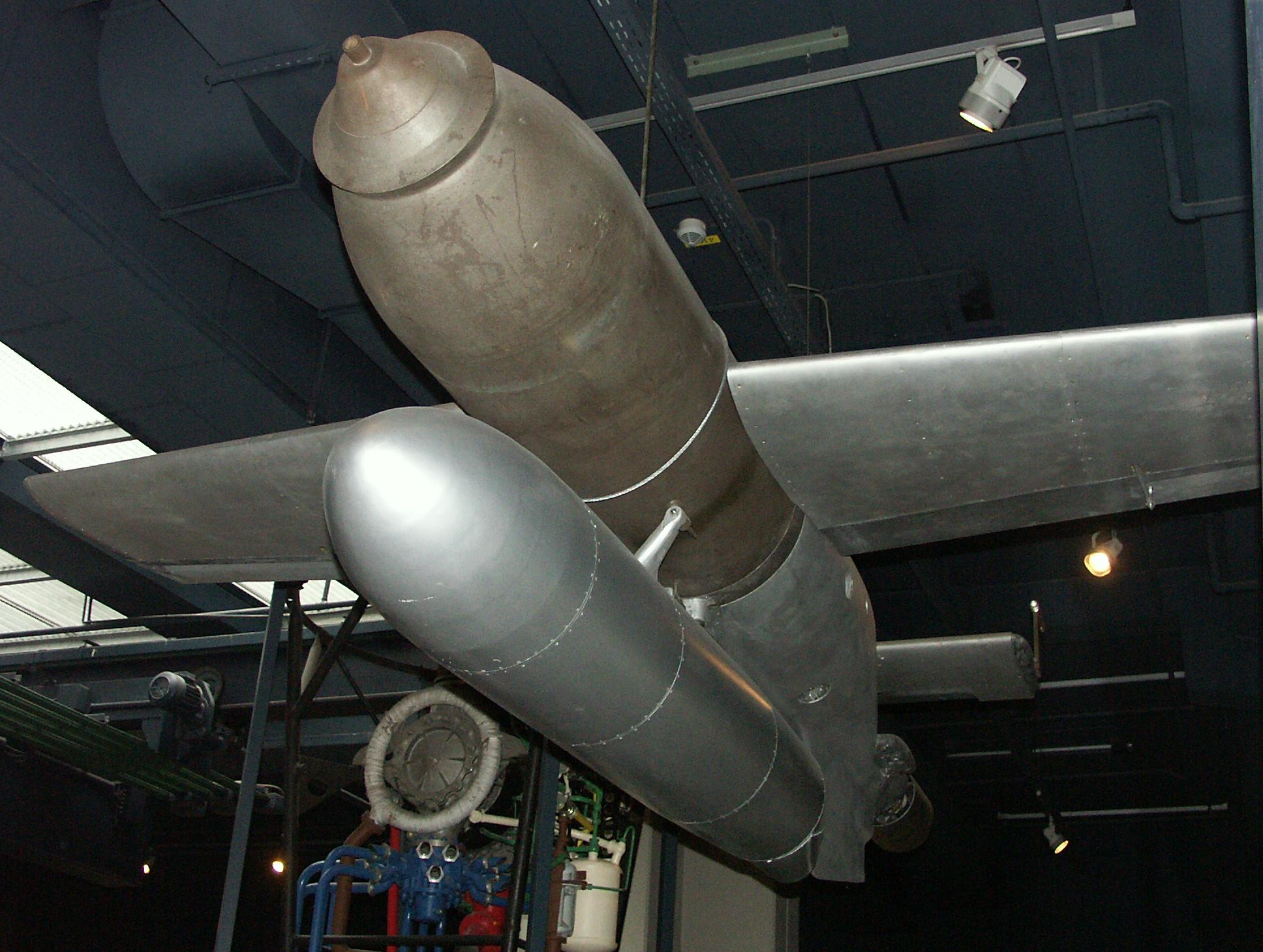
This Henschel Hs 293 anti-ship guided missile on display at the Deutsches Museum in Munich is the type of weapon used in the attack on Samuel Huntington.

The Huntington—in Convoy UGS-27, a 115-ship convoy—sailed from Hampton Roads on 15 December for Oran, arriving there on 3 January 1944. She departed from Oran on 16 January and arrived at Naples five days later. One week later, Samuel Huntington sailed to Anzio where she anchored one-quarter mile (400 m) off the beach on 29 January with 7,181 long tons (7,296 t) of cargo, including ammunition, canned gasoline and TNT.

=== Sinking ===
At sunset on 29 January, Luftwaffe bombers armed with Henschel Hs 293 anti-shipping glide bombs attacked the ships at anchor off Anzio. British cruiser Spartan was hit amidships and rolled over on her port side and sank with a loss of 65 men. Soon after Spartan was hit, another Hs 293 slammed into Samuel Huntington, penetrating to her boiler room before exploding and killing four men. The force of the explosion blew out two of her cargo hatches, launching a jeep into the stricken ship's flying bridge in the process. With no power, and, hence, no way of fighting the fire, Samuel Huntington's master ordered the ship abandoned, and the crew lowered her lifeboats and headed away from the ship. Fifteen minutes after the bomb's blast, another explosion rocked the ship, throwing a cloud of debris over 1,000 feet (300 m) in the air, and raining shrapnel on ships as far as 1 1/2 miles (2,400 m) away.

After the second explosion, Samuel Huntington settled to the bottom, but because the bottom had been only 3 feet (0.91 m) below her keel, most of the ship remained above the water. U.S. Navy salvage ship Weight came alongside the Huntington and trained two deck water guns and a 2.5-inch (6.4 cm) water hose to douse the fires. When the task seemed accomplished, Weight pulled away. The fires flared up again four hours later and Weight returned to fight the conflagration again. After tending to other ships damaged during the raid, Weight returned a third time. By the early morning hours on 30 January, any hope of salvaging Samuel Huntington or her cargo ended when the fires reached her load of canned gasoline. The resulting explosion completely destroyed the ship and again rained shrapnel on nearby ships. When the smoke cleared, no trace of the Huntington remained.
