= Colberg Boat Works =

Shipyard in Stockton, California, United States

Coordinates: 37.953860°N 121.302901°W

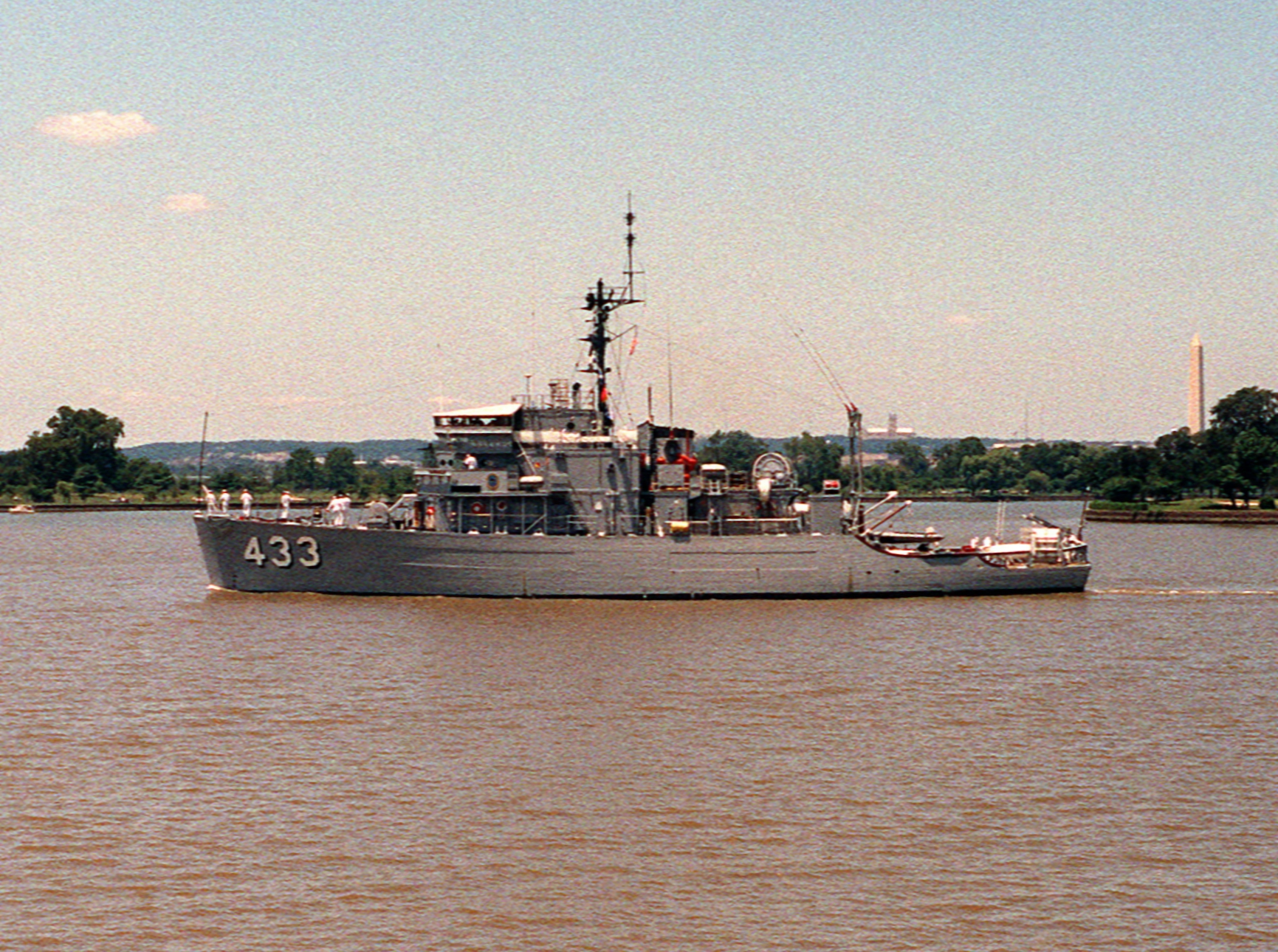
USS Engage (MSO-433) in 1983

Colberg Boat Works was a shipbuilding company in Stockton, California on the Stockton Channel. The original WWII office building burned to the ground in 2022. It was being prepared for moving to Brandon Island.To support the World War II demand for ships Colberg Boat Works built: Minesweepers, Type V ship Tugboats, and Submarine chasers. The minesweepers were an Aggressive-class minesweeper and Agile-class minesweeper class. Colberg Boat Works was opened by two brothers in the late 1890s, William and Henry J Colberg. After World War II, Wilton, Jack and Gordon Colberg sons of Henry Colberg took over the company. The shipyard closed in 1990s. The yard located at 848 West Fremont Street, Stockton, California. The Colberg Boat Works yard was next to the Stephens Bros. Boat Builders yard. Colberg Boat Works was on the deepwater port on the Stockton Ship Channel of the Pacific Ocean and an inland port located more than seventy nautical miles from the ocean, on the Stockton Channel and San Joaquin River-Stockton Deepwater Shipping Channel (before it joins the Sacramento River to empty into Suisun Bay.

== Ships ==
Original Name	Original Owner	Type	Tons	Feet	Delivered	Notes	Hull #	ship ID# O.N.
John		Freighter	250	109	1919			218594
	San Joaquin County	Ferry			1926			
Service	Freighters Inc.	Freighter	100	64	1927			226540
Prospect Island	John Lucas	Tug	15	47	1931			230479
McCloud	US Army	Launch		40	1942			na
Barge 37	US Army	Barge		45	1943			na
Barge 38	US Army	Barge		45	1943			na
YMS 95	US Navy	Minesweeper	278	136	12-Mar-42	Struck in 1946		na
YMS 97	US Navy	Minesweeper	278	136	11-Apr-42	Struck in 1947		na
YMS 99	US Navy	Minesweeper	278	136	27-Apr-42	Struck in 1946		na
YMS 383	US Navy	Minesweeper	278	136	24-Feb-43	Foundered and sank in 1945		na
YMS 384	US Navy	Minesweeper	278	136	9-Apr-43	Grounded in 1945 and destroyed		na
YMS 385	US Navy	Minesweeper	278	136	30-Apr-43	Mined and lost in 1944		na
YMS 386	US Navy	Minesweeper	278	136	23-Jul-43	Struck in 1946		na
YMS 387	US Navy	Minesweeper	278	136	17-Aug-43	Sold in 1946		na
YMS 388	US Navy	Minesweeper	278	136	24-Sep-43	Sold in 1947		na
Anchor (ARS 13)	US Navy	Rescue Ship	1,089	183	23-Oct-43	Sold in 1947		na
Protector (ARS 14)	US Navy	Rescue Ship	1,089	183	28-Dec-43	Sold in 1946; resold to Pakistan in 1952		na
Extractor (ARS 15)	US Navy	Rescue Ship	1,089	183	3-Mar-44	Sunk accidentally in the Marianas and lost in 1945		na
ATR 50	US Navy	Tug	850	165	5-May-44	Disposed of 1946		na
ATR 51	US Navy	Tug	850	165	22-Jun-44	Disposed of 1946		na
ATR 52	US Navy	Tug	850	165	31-Jul-44	Disposed of 1946		na
ATR 53	US Navy	Tug	850	165	11-Sep-44	Disposed of 1946		na
PCS 1402	US Navy	Sub Chaser	278	136	13-Jan-44			na
PCS 1403	US Navy	Sub Chaser	278	136	17-Feb-44	To the Philippines as Laguna (PG 12)		na
PCS 1404	US Navy	Sub Chaser	278	136	30-Mar-44	Later called Armistead Rust (AGS 9) 1945, Sold in 1948		na
YP 645	US Navy	Yard Patrol		120	1945	To MARAD 1947		na
YP 646	US Navy	Yard Patrol		120	1945	Fish and Wildlife Service as US FWS Henry O'Malley 1948–1951, later FV Santa Rosa		261691
Paolina T	M. & G. Torrente	Fishing Vessel	107	73	1944	Now called Day Island		246265
Delta Boss	Walnut Grove Marina	Freighter	48	52	1945	Active		248990
Dora W		Fishing Vessel	14	37	1946	Active	45-2	249930
How D Hai		Fishing Vessel	20	48	1946	Active		249931
Victory II	Delta Ferry	Ferry	91	58	1947	Active		251903
Aimee June		Fishing Vessel	14	37	1947	Active		251931
Dynamic (MSO 432)	US Navy	Minesweeper	780		7-Feb-54	To Spain 1974 as Guadalete (M 41): Struck in 1998		na
Engage (MSO 433)	US Navy	Minesweeper	780		29-Jun-54	Scrapped in 2002		na
Embattle (MSO 434)	US Navy	Minesweeper	780		16-Nov-54	Sold in 1976, scrapped in 1993		na
Mary T		Fishing Vessel	13	53	1955	Now called Elizabeth		269589
Edythe	Wes Anderson Eng.	Ind. Vessel	36	50	1955	Active	54-1	538926
Harbor King	Golden Gate Scenic SS	Ferry	77	62	1958	Active		276748
Standard No. 4	Standard Oil of CA	Tug	186	74	1958	Now called William R		276863
Albacore		Fisheries Patrol	95	82	1958	Now called Sea Scout Ship Chaser		277776
Chena	Crowley Marine	Tug	91	47	1959	Active		278711
Harbor Princess	Golden Gate Scenic SS	Ferry	98	82	1959	Active		278851
American River	Harbor Tug & Barge	Tug	134	84	1961	Now called Cassie Lind		287201
Royal Prince	Golden Gate Scenic SS	Ferry	98	83	1962	Active		288705
San Joaquin River	Harbor Tug & Barge	Tug	140	64	1964	Active	63-2	295630
Napa River	Harbor Tug & Barge	Tug	136	64	1967	Now called Petaluma	66-6	508762
Drake		Recreational	72	61	1967	Now called Phoenix	67-25	510718
Harbor Emperor	Golden Gate Scenic SS	Ferry	94	83	1968	Active		513351
Prudhoe Bay	Global Diving	Ind'l. Vessel	50	58	1969	Active		520254
Manson 44	Manson Construction	Barge	642	150	1968	Now called DS44		524054
Irene Lauritzen	Salt River Const'n.	Tug	40	47	1970	Active	69-3	525655
Kavik River	Crowley Marine	Tug	105	64	1970	Active		526289
Kuparuk River	Crowley Marine	Tug	105	64	1970	Active		526290
Catalina Prince	Catalina Cruises	Ferry	97	127	1971	Now called Alcatraz Flyer	71-1	533655
San Francisco	SF Bar Pilots	Pilot Boat	119	78	1973	Now called R/V Zephyr	72-18	545818
Catalina King	Catalina Cruises	Ferry	97	127	1974	Active	73-2	548119
Catalina Empress	Catalina Cruises	Ferry	97	127	1974	Now called Alcatraz Clipper		557225
Toolik River	Crowley Marine	Tug	105	64	1974	Active	74-2	557339
Lassen	Shaver Tptn.	Tug	136	66	1975	Active		562754
Sag River	Crowley Marine	Tug	105	64	1975	Active	75-1	564493
Catalina Monarch	Catalina Cruises	Ferry	97	127	1976	Now called Bay Monarch	76-1	572538
California	SF Bar Pilots	Pilot Boat	130	80	1976	Now called Drake	76-2	578339
Catalina Countess	Catalina Cruises	Ferry	97	127	1976	Now called Statue of Liberty V	77-1	582287
Royal Knight	Harbor Breeze Corp.	Ferry	59	78	1979	Now called Kristina	79-1	611286

== See also ==
- California during World War II
- Maritime history of California
- Moore Equipment Company in Stockton
- Hickinbotham Brothers Shipbuilders in Stockton
- Moore Equipment Company in Stockton
- Wooden boats of World War 2
- Cryer & Sons
