= USS Extricate =

U.S. Navy rescue and salvage ship

History

United States
- Name: USS Extricate
- Builder: Snow Shipyards, Inc., Rockland, Maine
- Laid down: date unknown
- Launched: 12 September 1942
- Commissioned: 27 July 1943
- Decommissioned: 5 December 1945
- Stricken: date unknown
- Honors and awards: 2 battle stars
- Fate: Abandoned, 9 October 1945; Destroyed, 4 March 1946

General characteristics
- Class & type: Anchor-class rescue and salvage ship
- Displacement: 1,089 long tons (1,106 t) light; 1,615 long tons (1,641 t) full
- Length: 183 ft 3 in (55.85 m)
- Beam: 37 ft (11 m)
- Draft: 14 ft 8 in (4.47 m)
- Propulsion: diesel-electric, twin screws, 2,780 hp (2,073 kW)
- Speed: 15 knots (28 km/h)
- Complement: 65
- Armament: 1 × single 3"/50 caliber gun; 2 × single 20 mm guns

USS Extricate (ARS-16) was an Anchor-class rescue and salvage ship commissioned by the U.S. Navy during World War II. Her task was to come to the aid of stricken vessels.

Extricate (ARS-16) was launched 12 September 1942 by Snow Shipyards, Inc., Rockland, Maine, sponsored by Mrs. Lewis Corman; and commissioned 27 July 1943.

== World War II North Atlantic service ==
After taking on salvage gear at New York, Extricate sailed from Norfolk, Virginia, 29 August 1943 in convoy for the Mediterranean. She called at Casablanca, Gibraltar, and Bizerte, before arriving at Naples, Italy, 16 October to serve as harbor fire fighting ship. Her first long struggle against fire was a successful three-day battle to save SS Iredell carrying highly flammable aviation gas. Extricate also fought a dock fire, and performed salvage work before leaving Naples 30 November for Palermo and Bari.

=== Commended for clearing Bari harbor ===
Assigned to clear the harbor of Bari, glutted with 17 ships sunk when two ammunition ships had been exploded by German bombing, Extricate won commendation from the British forces to whom she was then attached for the manner in which she carried out her duties. She raised two ships, beached a third, got an undamaged ship and three barges off the beach after they had been grounded in a storm, and carried out a miscellany of other salvage missions.

=== Invasion of Southern France ===
Extricate was overhauled at Bizerte and Oran before returning to Naples 11 May 1944 for salvage and towing duty along the west coast of Italy. From 7 August to 3 September she lay at Calvi, Corsica, preparing ships for their role in the invasion and capture of southern France, and from 6 September to 8 November, served at Marseille, clearing the harbor, fighting fires there and at Toulon, and putting to sea to rescue mined merchantmen. From 17 November to 17 December she was at the Azores for harbor and mooring work, and on 30 December she returned to Charleston, South Carolina, for overhaul.

=== Transfer to the Pacific Fleet ===
Extricate sailed from Charleston, South Carolina, 11 February 1945 for Pearl Harbor, where she had salvage duty from 10 March to 13 April, rescuing storm-damaged small craft. She continued these operations at Eniwetok from 24 April to 3 June, at Ulithi from 11 to 22 June and at Naval Base Okinawa at Okinawa from 29 June. Here she salvaged sunken and beached landing craft and provided repair services for large ships.

=== Destroyed by a typhoon ===
During the typhoon of 16 September, while aiding another ship, Extricate lost power, and fouled both anchors. She continued her salvage operations, although further imperiled by damage from an underwater obstruction. But another typhoon on 9 October beached Extricate, and she flooded so badly from the pounding that she had to be abandoned.

== Decommissioning ==
She was decommissioned 5 December 1945 and destroyed with explosives 4 March 1946.

== Military awards and honors ==
Extricate received two battle stars for World War II service.
