= Rescue and salvage ship =

Type of military salvage tug

Rescue and salvage ships (hull classification symbol ARS) are a type of military salvage tug. They are tasked with coming to the aid of stricken vessels. Their general mission capabilities include combat salvage, lifting, towing, retraction of grounded vessels, off-ship firefighting, and crewed diving operations. They were common during World War II.

== List of rescue and salvage ships of the United States Navy by class ==
The following ship classes have been designated under the ARS hull classification symbol in United States Navy Service.

=== Lapwing-class minesweeper conversions ===
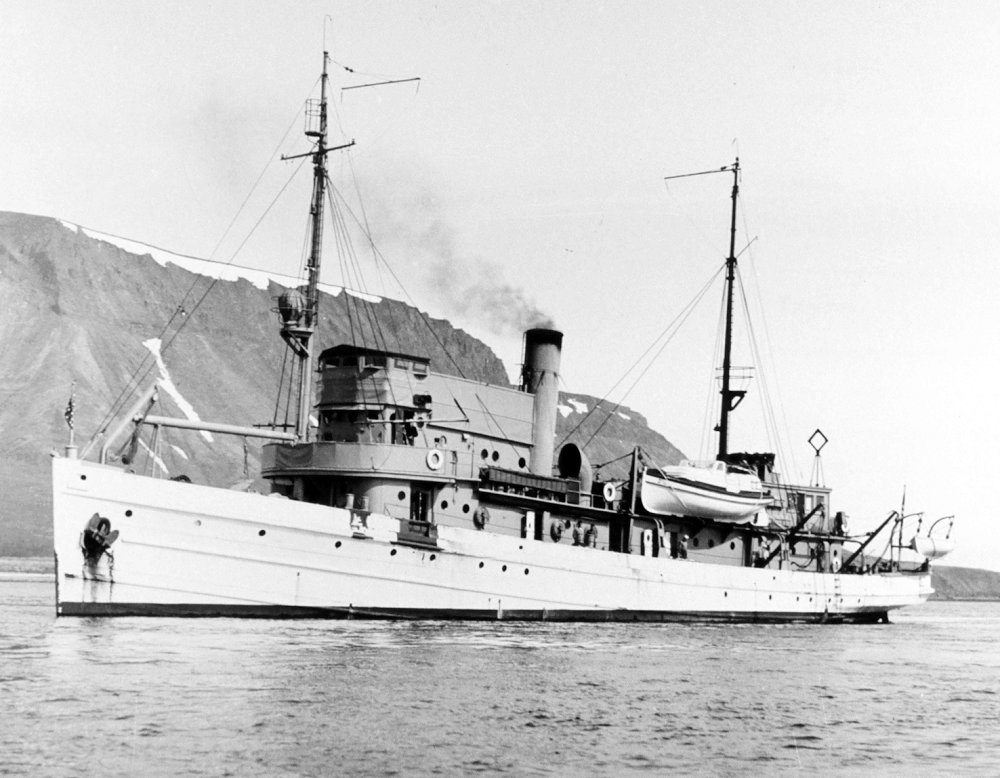
The Lapwing-class salvage ship USS Discoverer (ARS-3) as USC&GS Discoverer c. 1935

The earliest designated United States Navy salvage ships (ARS) were converted Lapwing-class minesweepers. Ships of this type were operated by the United States Navy as salvage ships from June 1941 until USS Viking was decommissioned and scrapped in 1953.

- USS Viking (ARS-1)
- USS Crusader (ARS-2)
- USS Discoverer (ARS-3)
- USS Redwing (ARS-4)
- USS Warbler (ARS-11)
- USS Willet (ARS-12)
- USS Brant (ARS-32)

=== Diver class ===
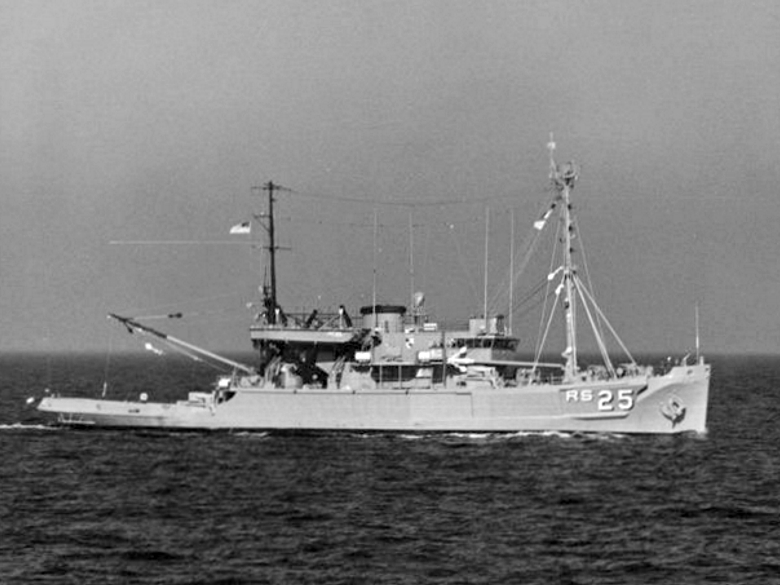
The Diver-class salvage ship USS Safeguard (ARS-25)

The United States Navy operated Diver-class rescue and salvage ships (ARS) from October 1943 until the last example was decommissioned in July 1979. Several ships of this class were converted to other uses, and USS Shackle remained in service as the 213' United States Coast Guard Cutter USCGC Acushnet until March 2011.

- USS Diver (ARS-5)
- USS Escape (ARS-6) (Converted to USCGC Escape (WMEC-6))
- USS Grapple (ARS-7)
- USS Preserver (ARS-8)
- USS Shackle (ARS-9) (Converted to USCGC Acushnet (WMEC-167))
- USS Cable (ARS-19)
- USS Chain (ARS-20) (Converted to USNS Chain (T-AGOR-17))
- USS Curb (ARS-21)
- USS Current (ARS-22)
- USS Deliver (ARS-23)
- USS Grasp (ARS-24)
- USS Safeguard (ARS-25)
- USS Seize (ARS-26) (Converted to USCGC Yocona (WAT-168))
- USS Snatch (ARS-27) (Converted to USNS Argo (T-AGOR-18))
- USS Valve (ARS-28)
- USS Vent (ARS-29)
- USS Clamp (ARS-33)
- USS Gear (ARS-34)

=== Miscellaneous civilian vessel conversions ===
Several ships were converted and redesignated as salvage ships (ARS) during World War II.

- USS Assistance (ARS-10) (canceled)
- USS Rescuer (ARS-18)
- USS Accelerate (ARS-30)
- USS Harjurand (ARS-31)
- USS Tackle (ARS-37)

=== Anchor class ===
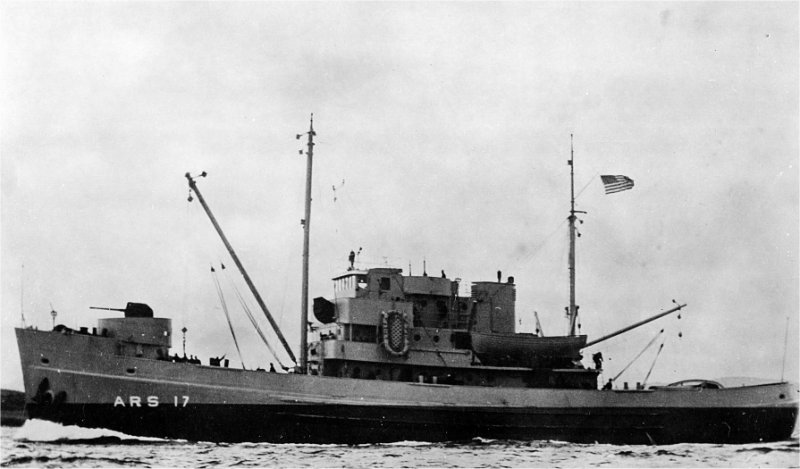
The Anchor-class rescue and salvage ship USS Restorer (ARS-17)

The United States Navy operated Anchor-class rescue and salvage ships (ARS) from October 1943 until March 1946.

- USS Anchor (ARS-13)
- USS Protector (ARS-14)
- USS Extractor (ARS-15)
- USS Extricate (ARS-16)
- USS Restorer (ARS-17)

=== Weight class ===
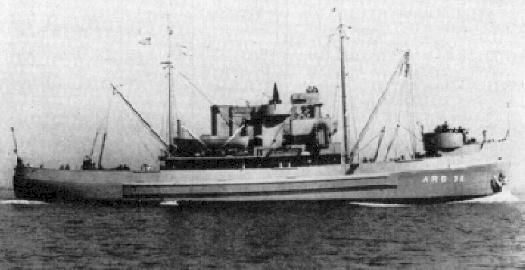
The Weight-class salvage ship USS Swivel (ARS-36).

The United States Navy operated Weight-class rescue and salvage ships (ARS) from August 1943 until the last example was decommissioned in June 1946. The Weight-class ships were originally intended for delivery to the Royal Navy under different names, as part of the Lend-Lease program. However, they were instead delivered to and operated by the United States Navy.

- USS Weight (ARS-35)
- USS Swivel (ARS-36)

=== Bolster class ===
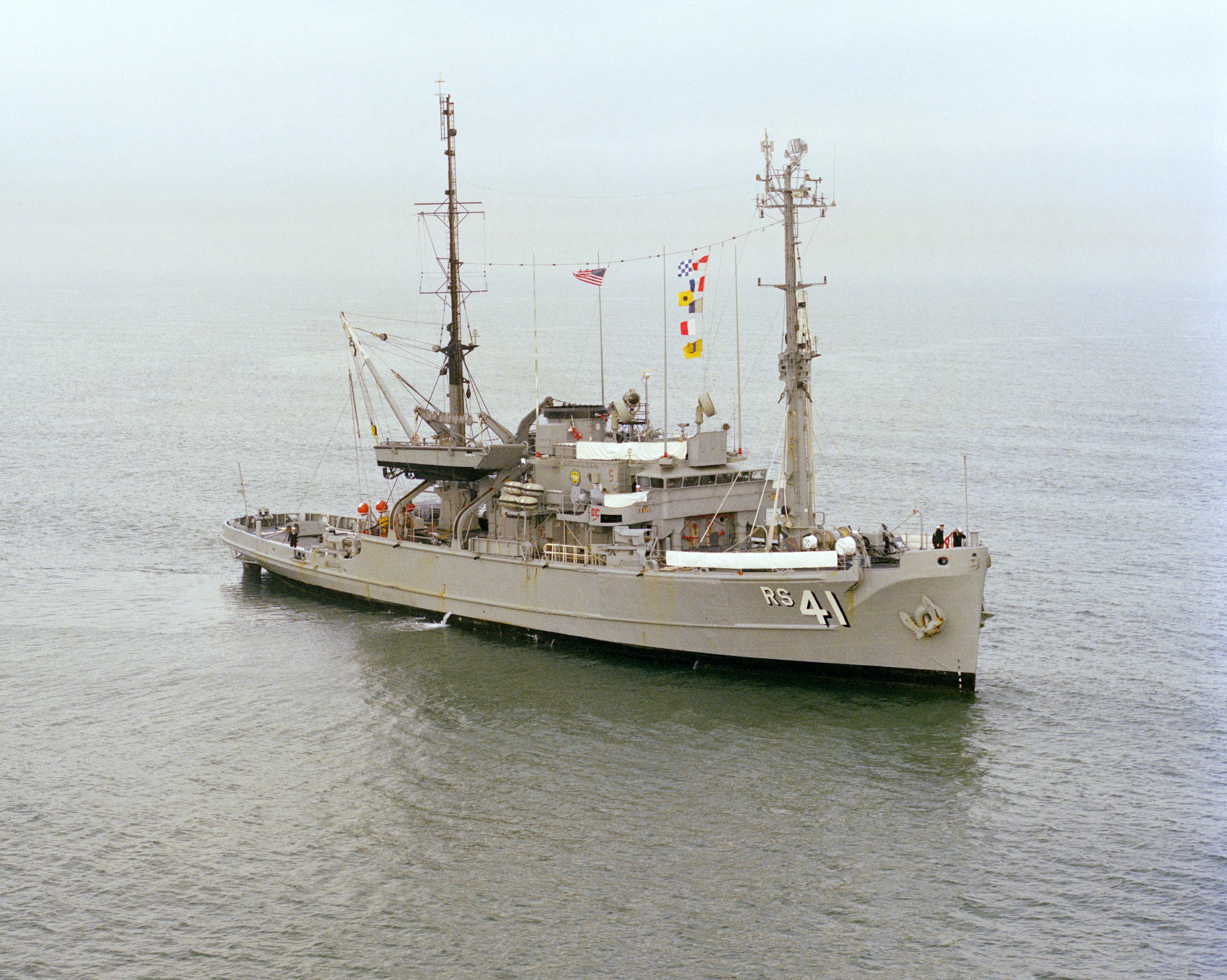
The Bolster-class salvage ship USS Opportune (ARS-41)

Bolster-class rescue and salvage ships (ARS) were operated by the United States Navy from July 1944 until the last example was decommissioned in September 1994.

- USS Bolster (ARS-38)
- USS Conserver (ARS-39)
- USS Hoist (ARS-40)
- USS Opportune (ARS-41)
- USS Reclaimer (ARS-42)
- USS Recovery (ARS-43)
- USS Retriever (ARS-44) (canceled)
- USS Skillful (ARS-45) (canceled)
- USS Support (ARS-46) (canceled)
- USS Toiler (ARS-47) (canceled)
- USS Urgent (ARS-48) (canceled)
- USS Willing (ARS-49) (canceled)

=== Safeguard class ===
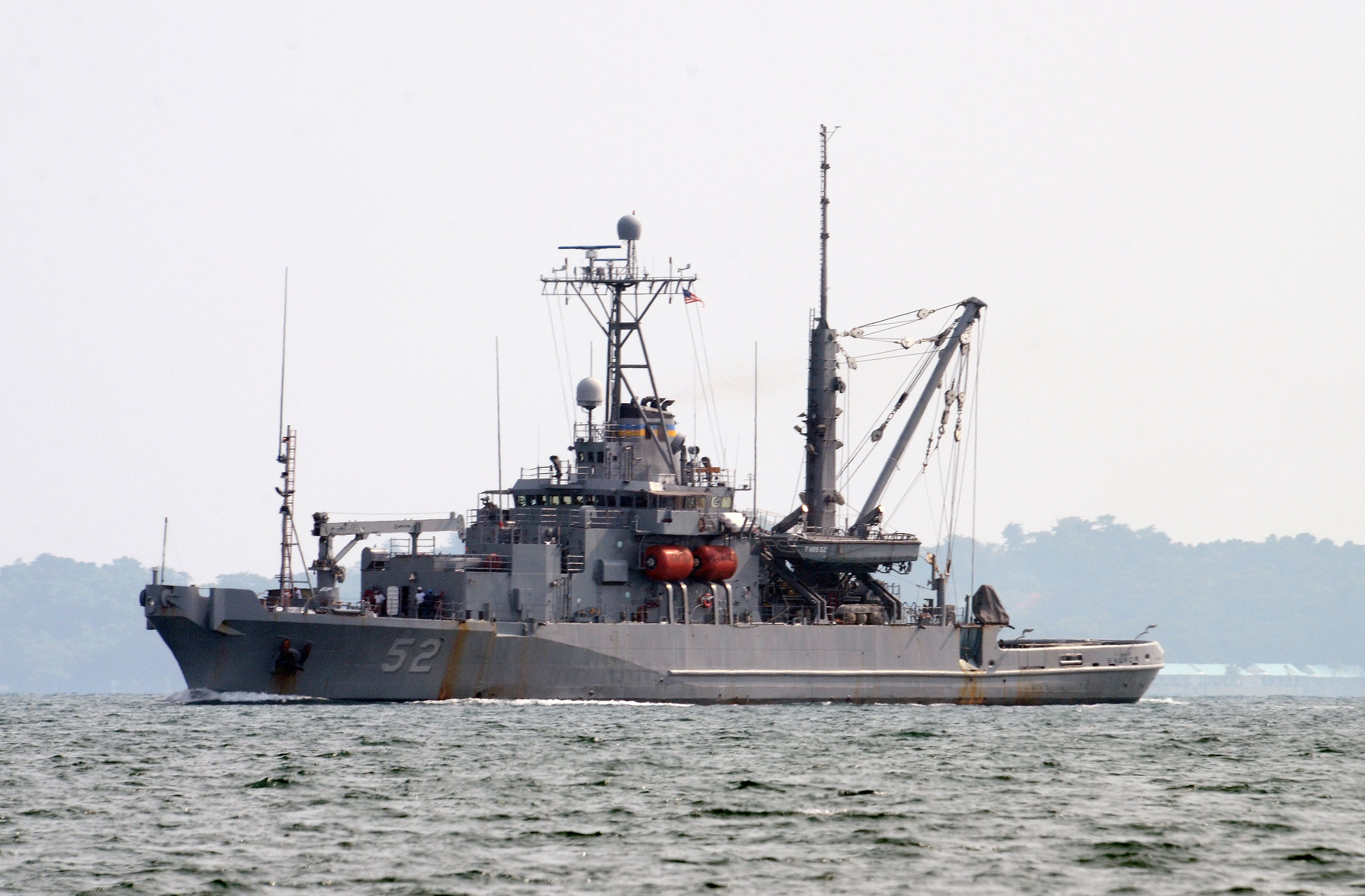
The Safeguard-class salvage ship USNS Salvor (T-ARS-52)

Safeguard-class salvage ships (T-ARS) are operated by Military Sealift Command in support of United States Navy operations. They were operated by the United States Navy as commissioned auxiliaries from November 1982 until the last example (Safeguard) was decommissioned in September 2007. Two are currently in service as part of the MSC.

- USNS Safeguard (T-ARS-50) - Decommissioned
- USNS Grasp (T-ARS-51)
- USNS Salvor (T-ARS-52)
- USNS Grapple (T-ARS-53) - Decommissioned
- ARS-54 (unnamed, canceled)

== See also ==
- Da Wu-class rescue and salvage ship – Class of Taiwanese naval ships
