= USS Engage (MSO-433) =

Minesweeper of the United States Navy

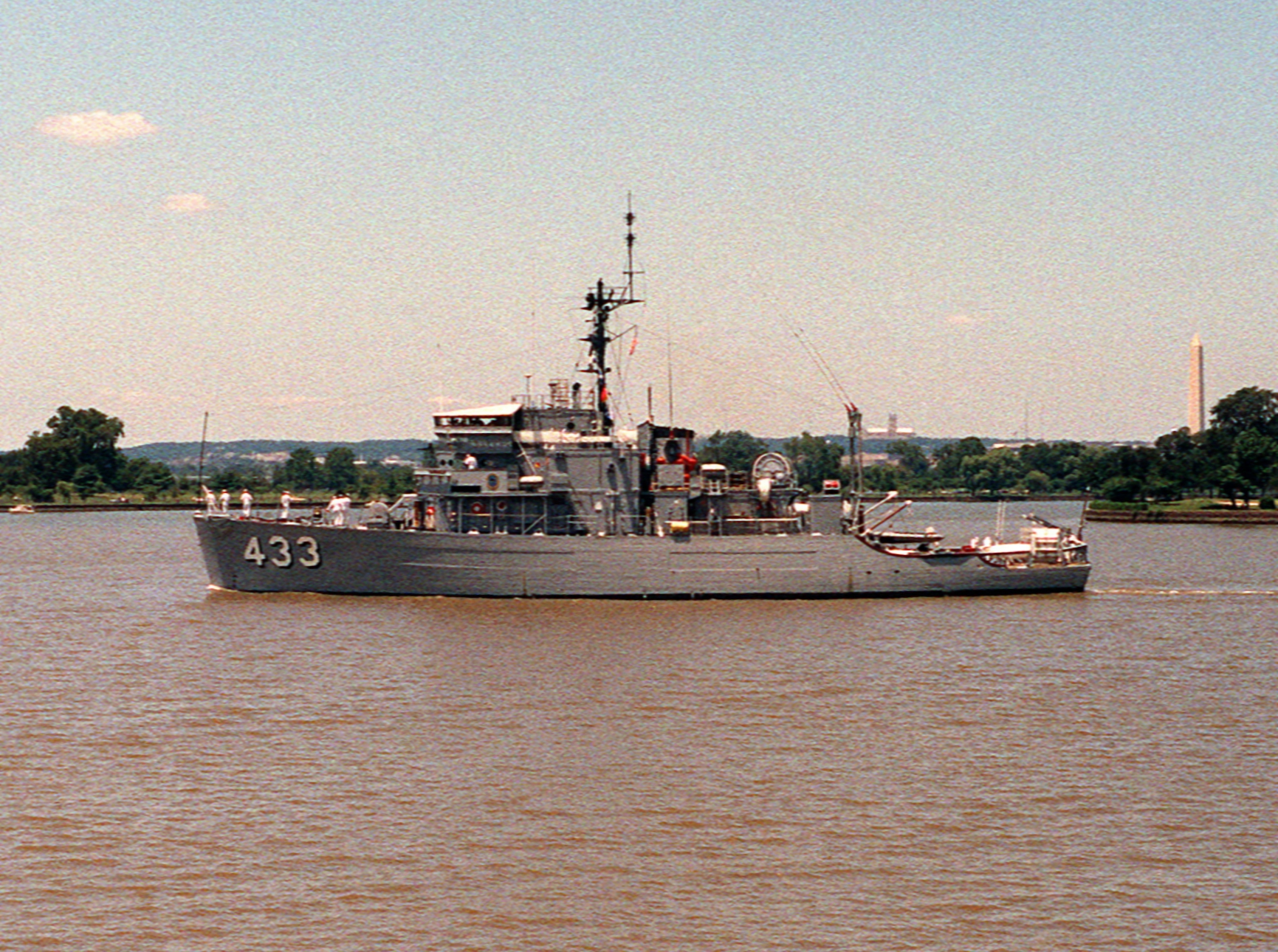

History

United States
- Builder: Colberg Boat Works, Stockton, California
- Laid down: 7 November 1951
- Launched: 18 June 1953
- Commissioned: 29 June 1954
- Decommissioned: 30 December 1991
- Reclassified: MSO-433, 7 February 1955
- Stricken: 20 April 1992
- Fate: Sold for scrapping, 15 April 1994

General characteristics
- Class & type: Aggressive class minesweeper
- Displacement: 775 tons
- Length: 172 ft (52.43 m)
- Beam: 36 ft (10.97 m)
- Draught: 10 ft (3.05 m)
- Propulsion: 4 × Packard ID1700 diesel engines, replaced by; 4 × Waukasha Motors Co. diesels, two shafts, two controllable pitch propellers
- Speed: 14 knots (26 km/h)
- Complement: 5 officers, 65 enlisted
- Armament: Initial config: 1 × single 40 mm gun mount, 2 × .50 cal (12.7 mm) machine guns, Final configuration, 1 × twin 20 mm gun mount, 2 × .50 cal. machine guns remain

USS Engage (MSO-433), an Agile-class minesweeper, was the second ship of the United States Navy to be named Engage.

The second Engage (AM-433/MSO-433) was launched 18 June 1953 by Colberg Boat Works, Stockton, California; sponsored by Mrs. R. B. Richmond; and commissioned 29 June 1954. She was reclassified MSO-433, 7 February 1955. Originally intended to be USS Elusive it was changed to Engage to avoid potential phonetic conflict with USS Illusive (MSO-448).

From her home port at Long Beach, where she first arrived 21 July 1954, Engage operated in mine warfare and general training along the west coast, preparing for her deployments to the Far East in 1955–56, 1958, and 1960. During these, she trained with minecraft of the navies of the Republics of China and the Philippines, and the Royal Thailand navy, since an important duty for minecraft serving in the Far East is to improve the readiness of friendly navies to operate in mutual defense.

Engage participated in Operation Market Time (11 March 1965 to December 1972) which was created by joining the US Navy and the South Vietnamese Navy in an effort to stop the flow of supplies from North Vietnam into the south by sea. According to Navy reports, Operation Market Time was very successful, but received little credit. Eventually all the supply routes at sea became non-existent, which forced the North Vietnamese to use the Ho Chi Minh trail.

Engage also participated in Operation End Sweep which began in January 1973. The last provision of the Vietnam war cease-fire agreement that directly related to the Navy entailed removal of the U.S. sea mines laid along the North Vietnamese coast and the Mark 36 Destructors dropped into inland waterways. On 28 January, following months of extensive preparation and training, the Seventh Fleet's Mine Countermeasures Force (Task Force 78), led by Rear Admiral Brian McCauley, sailed from Subic Bay and shaped course for a staging area off Haiphong. On 6 February, one day after Commander Task Force 78 met in the city to coordinate actions with his North Vietnamese opposite, Colonel Hoang Huu Thai, Operation End Sweep got underway. A total of 10 ocean minesweepers, 9 amphibious ships, 6 fleet tugs, 3 salvage ships, and 19 destroyer types served with Task Force 78 during the six months of Operation End Sweep.

Engage was decommissioned 30 December 1991 in Mayport, Florida. After decommissioning, Engage (ex-MSO-433) remained in the Philadelphia inactive ships facility until delivered to Baltimore Marine. She was scrapped 17 May 2002.
