= David Carpenter =

American serial killer (born 1930)

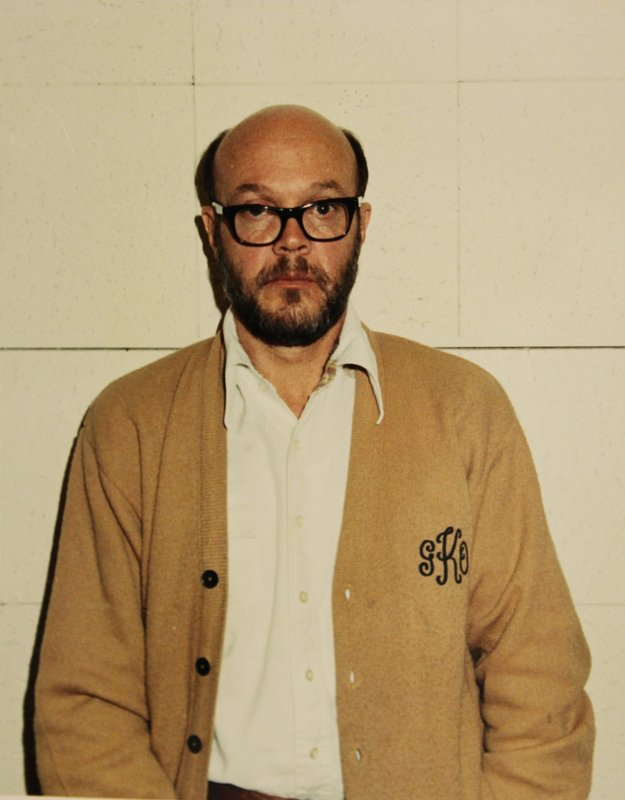
- May 1981 mugshot of Carpenter
- Born: David Joseph Carpenter; May 6, 1930 (age 96); San Francisco, California, U.S.
- Other names: The Trailside Killer; The Mount Tam Killer
- Convictions: First degree murder with special circumstances (7 counts); Attempted murder; Attempted rape (2 counts); Rape (3 counts); Robbery; Assault; Auto theft; Escape; Kidnapping
- Penalty: Los Angeles County; Death (November 16, 1984); San Diego County; Death (July 19, 1988)

Details
- Victims: 8 confirmed 10–11+ suspected
- Span of crimes: 1950 – May 2, 1981
- Country: United States
- State: California
- Date apprehended: May 14, 1981
- Imprisoned at: California Health Care Facility

David Joseph Carpenter (born May 6, 1930), also called the Trailside Killer, is an American serial killer and sex offender who raped and murdered various victims in the San Francisco Bay Area between 1979 and 1981. He was sentenced to death for seven murders and is believed to be responsible for several more.

Carpenter began committing sexual assaults at age 15 and was admitted to a mental hospital at age 17. He committed all of his murders while on parole for rape and kidnapping convictions. Active primarily in Marin County and Santa Cruz County, Carpenter would hide along tree lines on secluded trails and wait for his target to approach and then would restrain, rape, and sometimes torture them before killing them. A .38 caliber handgun was his preferred weapon, which was used in all but one of the killings. According to pathologists, Carpenter would get so much enjoyment from tormenting his victims that he would lose his stutter.

Both of Carpenter's trials had to be moved to Southern California due to extensive publicity. In 1984, he was tried and convicted in Los Angeles County of two murders and one attempted murder, for which he was sentenced to death. Four years later, he was tried and convicted in San Diego County of five additional murders and given another death sentence. He is currently incarcerated at California Health Care Facility in Stockton, California. Carpenter is currently the oldest death row inmate in the United States.

== Early life ==
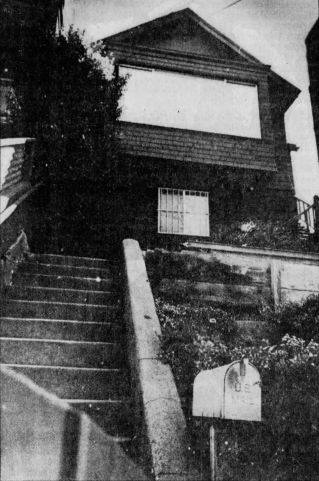
Carpenter's home on 38 Sussex Street in Glen Park, San Francisco

David Joseph Carpenter was born in San Francisco on May 6, 1930. In his youth, he suffered physical abuse by his alcoholic father Elwood and domineering mother Frances, mostly concerning his persistent bed-wetting and cruelty to animals. Frances barred young Carpenter from playing outside with neighborhood kids and forced him to learn to play the violin and take ballet lessons.

Carpenter attended Glen Park Elementary School, where he was bullied for having a stutter. His teachers recommended him to enroll in speech therapy but Frances resisted all efforts. After he was accused of biting a childhood friend, Carpenter was absent from school for several days and returned with bruises on his arms and legs. Around the time he reached adolescence, he sparked a fierce temper that psychologists would claim developed into sexual rage. He attended Balboa High School until he was thrown out in his sophomore year for dragging a female student down the hall after an argument.

Carpenter has acknowledged he molested several children in his adolescence, including two of his cousins, beginning when he was 15 years old. At age 17, he was arrested for the first time on allegations he sexually assaulted a 3-year-old girl. He was placed in custody of the California Youth Authority before spending several years at Napa State Hospital. When referring to the escalation of Carpenter's crimes, his mother was quoted saying to a probation officer, "As soon as he was able to walk, he was getting into trouble". That same probation officer described him as "quite a liar". In 1950, Carpenter was arrested for the rape of a 17-year-old girl, and after pleading not guilty he was acquitted at trial.

In the mid-1950s, Carpenter was employed as a purser on SS Fleetwood. In 1955, he married Ellen Cooke, with whom he had three children before their divorce in 1961. Carpenter later remarked to a psychiatrist that his first marriage was unsatisfactory because Cooke "was not interested in anything but local neighborhood gossip". Cooke would say that Carpenter was domineering, strong-willed, and charming, and said she knew nothing of his prior run-ins with law enforcement.

== First offenses ==
Carpenter later gained employment at a San Francisco post office where he met 32-year-old Lois DeAndrade, the future mother of television personality Lisa Rinna. On July 11, 1960, Carpenter, armed with a knife and hammer, was prowling through San Francisco when he approached his friend DeAndrade. He convinced her to get in his car and drove her to the Presidio where he attacked her; slashed her hands with the knife; when she fell to the ground, he beat her on the head with the hammer. The attack was interrupted by Jewell Hicks, a military officer, who shot and wounded Carpenter. Once in recovery, DeAndrade claimed that, despite Carpenter's apparent stutter, she didn't recall him stuttering at all during the attack. After his arrest, he was booked for assault with a deadly weapon and pleaded guilty, receiving a 14-year federal prison sentence. Carpenter claimed his "trigger" to commit the attack was the 1960 film Psycho. He earned a high school diploma during his incarceration and was released in 1969, subsequently marrying his second wife, Helen.

=== 1970 ===
From January to February 1970, Carpenter went on a crime spree in the Bay Area. The first of these cases occurred after he rear-ended a vehicle being driven by a young woman, and after a heated exchange he shoved her to the ground and raped her before stabbing her with a spatula. He was armed with a hunting knife during the second attack, which was against a 19-year-old girl in Boulder Creek. On February 3, he forced his way into the home of 45-year-old Lucille Davis in Modesto, where he bound her wrists and demanded her car keys, and he subsequently stole her vehicle and drove to Angels Camp. There, he confronted a 21-year-old mother and forced her to drive him to Oakdale while her 16-month-old son sat in the back of the vehicle. When they arrived, Carpenter forced both out and drove off. After he was detained on February 4, investigator James Marston obtained permission from Carpenter's wife to search their vehicle, which was found to have contained the knife used in the second attack.

Around the time of his arrest, the Zodiac Killer was active in the San Francisco Bay Area, which drew high media attention and search efforts. In an effort to gain some sort of attention to himself, Carpenter began to refer to himself as "Zodiac" to other inmates. Authorities were alerted and investigated him, but since he had been imprisoned during the time three of the murders occurred, he was cleared. On April 26, Carpenter and five other inmates being held at the Calaveras County jail cut their way through cell bars and escaped. He was captured two weeks later and sentenced to five-years-to-life imprisonment for auto theft and escape charges, and five-to-twenty-five years on kidnapping charges.

=== Incarceration ===
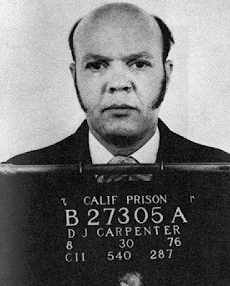
Carpenter in 1976

During a presentencing hearing, it was estimated that Carpenter had an intelligence quotient (IQ) of 125. He initially served his sentence at Folsom State Prison until being transferred to San Quentin State Prison in 1972, later returning to Folsom before being transferred to California Medical Facility. A psychiatrist's report identified him with having antisocial personality disorder (ASPD), which the United States Parole Commission defined as someone who is manipulative and a pathological liar. Despite many warnings, Carpenter was paroled for the California convictions in February 1977 but was immediately turned over to federal custody for other convictions. Around 1978, Carpenter befriended fellow inmate Shane Mitchell Williams, (Note: Williams is often identified as "Jeff Ronson" or "Michael Ronson" in reports, but these were just aliases he used during court appearances.) who was serving time for several bank robberies committed in Los Angeles.

Carpenter was granted full release on May 2, 1979, and transferred to a halfway house for 60 days and afterwards moved in with his parents in San Francisco's Glen Park neighborhood. Under his parole conditions, he would remain on supervision until October 28, 1982, and would have to report monthly to his parole officer in San Francisco. In October 1979, he began attending a vocational school in Hayward to learn offset printing, and after several months of training he was hired to lecture the course.

After Williams' release, he and his wife, Karen Kilroy, made trips to San Francisco to visit Carpenter, and together the trio attended punk clubs along Broadway. When they confided in Carpenter about wanting to resume committing robberies, Carpenter instructed the couple that using a gun would make getting away with their crimes easier. Thereafter, the couple went on a crime spree with a .38 caliber revolver loaned to them by Carpenter, which had previously been used in several of the murders. Williams and Kilroy committed robberies in San Francisco, Los Angeles, and Phoenix, Arizona. On June 1, 1981, after Carpenter's arrest, Williams and Kilroy were arrested for a botched robbery on Ventura Boulevard and subsequently were connected to their previous crimes.

== Murders ==
Carpenter is believed to have begun killing in the summer of 1979. His modus operandi was to hide in tree lines along hiking trails and then confront his targets once they approached. Carpenter was convicted of seven murders which occurred between October 1980 and May 1981 in Marin County and Santa Cruz County. He was also linked via DNA—albeit not charged with—an October 1979 murder in San Francisco. Two other murders, lacking physical evidence, are also believed to have been committed by him, along with the suspected homicide of a teenage girl in Daly City. He originally used a knife in his attacks until he duped a female friend into buying him a .38 caliber revolver in 1980. All of Carpenter's suspected victims were aged between 18 and 44, the majority of which were in their early twenties.

Before Carpenter's identification, the murderer was known as the "Mount Tam Killer" by Marin County investigators as most of the killings there occurred within range of Mount Tamalpais. Early on, investigators incorrectly believed the killer was in his 20s or 30s, while Carpenter was 50. After his murders stretched into Santa Cruz County in 1981, he was redubbed the "Trailside Killer". A more accurate depiction of the killer as a balding man in his 50s helped police arrest Carpenter.

=== 1979 ===
On August 20, 1979, 44-year-old Edda Kane was found murdered along a hiking trail near Mount Tamalpais. Kane was a bank employee from Mill Valley and an experienced hiker who had last been seen the day prior by her husband. Kane had been stripped of her clothes and shot once in the head by a .44 caliber gun. Days prior to the murder, one of Carpenter's acquaintances had reported that their handgun, a Charter Arms .44 caliber special, had been stolen. The weapon has never been located, but the circumstances surrounding its possible link to the murder have made Carpenter the case's prime suspect.

Two months after Kane's murder, Carpenter murdered 23-year-old Mary Francis Bennett from Deer Lodge, Montana, a graduate of Montana State University. On October 21, he attacked Bennett as she was jogging at Lands End and forcibly dragged her in nearby bushes and attempted to rape her. After a struggle during which Bennett managed to dislocate one of Carpenter's thumbs, he stabbed her over 25 times around her back, throat, breasts and groin. Her neck wounds were so deep that she was nearly decapitated. Several residents reported to have heard Bennett's "prolonged, agonized screams", but didn't investigate as a police car was seen in the area and assumed it would respond to the noises. Carpenter showed up at an emergency room not long after, claiming his thumb had been bitten by a dog. Bennett's body was discovered protruding from underbrush at approximately 4:30 p.m. by a group of hitchhikers, who had followed her blood trail from the access road. Carpenter was named a suspect in her murder in 1981, but was not charged due to lack of evidence. His guilt would be established in 2010 with a DNA match.

=== 1980 ===
Carpenter's third suspected murder occurred on March 8, 1980, when 23-year-old Barbara Ann Schwartz was stabbed to death on a hiking trail near Mount Tamalpais. Her body was found in the fetal position several days later. A bloodied butcher knife found near her body was the weapon used. After the murder, sheriff Al Howenstein urged local women to not hike alone on Marin County trails. A pair of glasses, found near the crime scene, may have belonged to Carpenter, but this has never been proven.

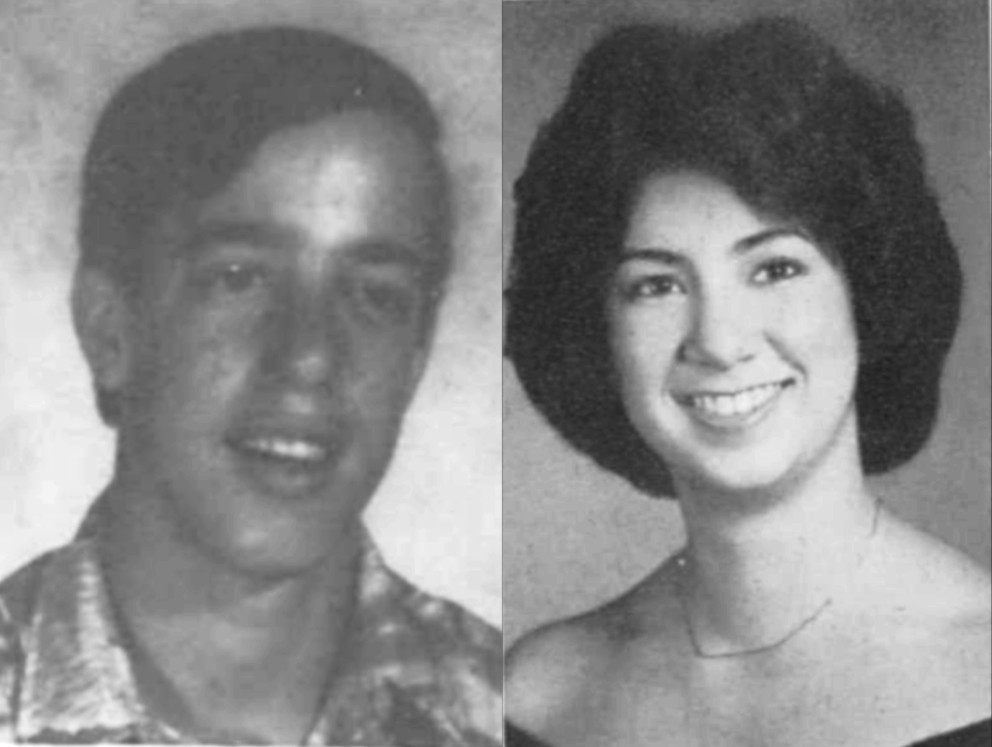
Rick Stowers and Cynthia Moreland

In September, Carpenter showed his former prison pen pal Mollie Purnell an advertisement for a .38 caliber revolver on sale for $230 in San Leandro and asked her to purchase it for him as part of a favor. He told her he wanted to use it to join the mafia and after initially hesitating, Carpenter persuaded her by saying if there was ever a problem, she could tell authorities it had been stolen from her. She purchased the gun on October 2 and gifted it to Carpenter. Nine days later, on October 11, Carpenter confronted 19-year-old Richard Stowers and 18-year-old Cynthia Moreland, an engaged couple from Sonoma County, as they walked along the Sky Camp Trail at the Point Reyes National Seashore park. Using the gun he had obtained, he forced the couple on their knees and shot them execution-style.

After several days of not knowing their whereabouts, Moreland's parents and the U.S. Coast Guard (Stowers was enlisted) notified the Marin County Sheriff's Department and the Cotati Police Department of the couple's disappearance. Law enforcement initially believed that Stowers and Moreland had simply eloped, given that Moreland's 1974 Toyota Corolla could not be located and a guardsman at the Training Center Petaluma claiming to have seen Moreland alive three days after her disappearance. As such, Stowers was initially labeled a deserter. Later, Moreland's vehicle would be found abandoned in a parking lot near Point Reyes trailhead.

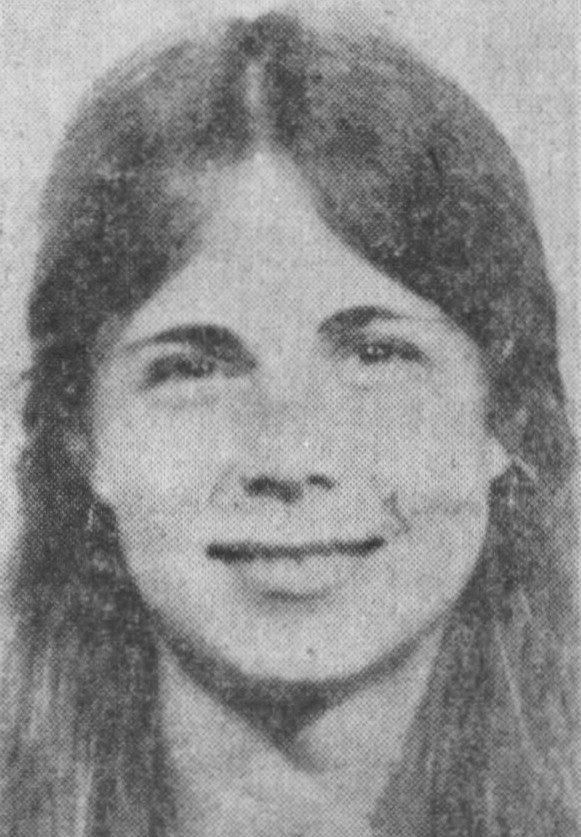
Anne Alderson

Three days later, on the afternoon of October 14, Carpenter was prowling through Mount Tamalpais State Park when he accosted, raped, and fatally shot 26-year-old Anne Evelyn Alderson, who was an attendee at the nearby Cushing Memorial Amphitheatre. She was reported missing by her father Robert, who was a respected San Rafael physician, and the next day a search party discovered her body roughly one-quarter mile east of the Amphitheatre. Alderson was a 1976 graduate of Evergreen Valley College, where she studied environmental issues and animal behavior. She had returned to the Bay Area just several months before her murder after volunteering for the Peace Corps in Colombia. Her death sparked a temporary shut down of hiking on Mount Tamalpais.

On November 28, 22-year-old Diane Marie O'Connell, a Cornell University graduate from Queens, New York, went missing while hiking near Point Reyes National Seashore. She was discovered nude and shot to death the next day. Along with her body, police discovered the body of 23-year-old Shauna May of Pullman, Washington, who was shot to death while hiking near Point Reyes National Seashore likely the same day of O'Connell's murder. Like Alderson, May was a graduate of Evergreen Valley College where she studied social sciences, mathematics, and computer science. Shortly after her body was found, the decomposed bodies of Stowers and Moreland were found.

=== Investigation ===
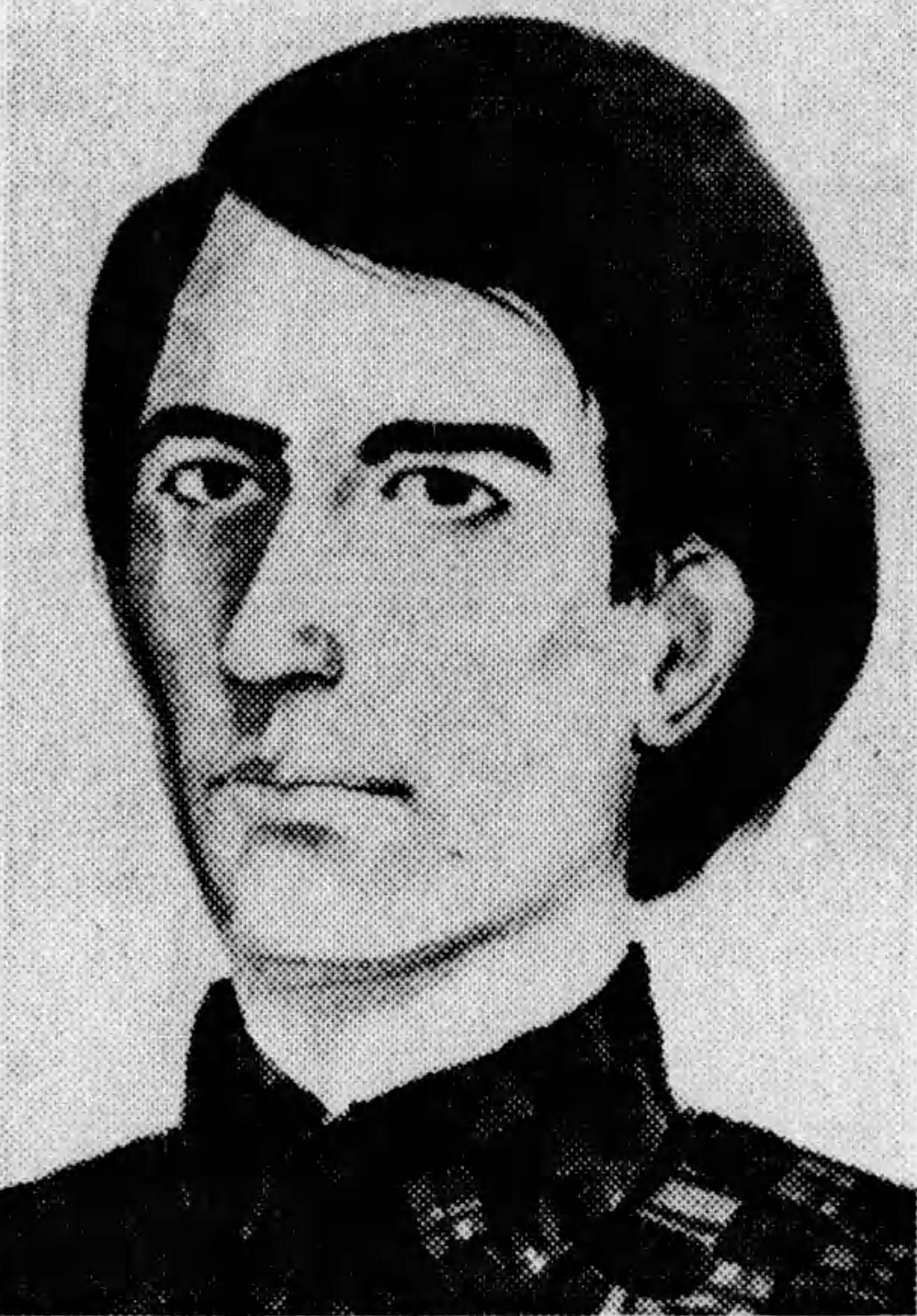
Witness sketch of an individual seen near the murder of Schwartz

A week after Alderson's killing, authorities announced that a local fugitive named Mark McDermand was a suspect in her death and several others. McDermand had fled after an arrest warrant was issued for the shooting deaths of his mother and older brother in their Tamalpais Valley home. In response McDermand wrote a letter to Sheriff Al Howenstein saying that while he did in fact kill his mother and brother, he did not kill anybody else. When The Press Democrat reported on the story on October 22, the term "Mount Tam Killer" was given to the assailant. McDermand's arrest did not bring an end to the murders in Marin County and as such he was cleared of suspicion. The following year he pled guilty to the murders of his mother and brother and was given a life sentence.

By early December, the six murders had been linked to the same killer. The profile upon which homicide investigators relied described the killer as a lustful offender who thrived on inflicting psychological torture on his victims and enjoyed when they pleaded for mercy. The profile indicated that the offender was a misogynist who committed murder to achieve psychological relief but not enough to fully satisfy him, that his urges would only continue to build up, and that he might be plagued with guilt. It also suggested that the killer may be easily thrown into anger and over time would experience both physical and mental deterioration, which may lead to him experiencing anxiety attacks and hot flashes.

On December 4, an unknown man claiming to be the killer made three phone calls to the Marin County Sheriff's Office before calling into KPIX-TV and KRON-TV. The caller said he disputed the psychological profile drawn of him and exclaimed he was not the "spoiled child" they made him out to be. The man made fourteen more phone calls over the next two days saying each time he needed help and that he was ready to surrender, but the calls suddenly ceased after December 6. Despite receiving more than 750 tips from across the country, including from as far as South Carolina, authorities had no solid suspects at this time.

=== 1981 ===
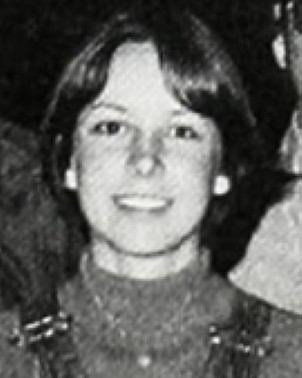
Ellen Hansen

On March 29, 1981, Carpenter voyaged over 90 miles to Santa Cruz County and staked out Henry Cowell Redwoods State Park. As he looked for potential victims from an observation deck he spotted a couple, 20-year-olds Ellen Marie Hansen and Steven Russell Haertle, who were both students at University of California-Davis, walking on a secluded trail leading to Monterey Bay. Armed with his gun, he approached the couple and stopped them at gunpoint and ordered them to follow him. He then told Hansen "I want to rape you", and when she told him "no", he walked both further down the trail before opening fire. Hansen was shot multiple times in the head and killed while Haertle was knocked unconscious having been shot in the neck. Haertle later awoke and sought help from nearby hikers. He was treated for his neck wound which left him with severe nerve damage to his vocal cords and eye, but he made a full recovery.

On May 2, 1981, Carpenter murdered his final victim, 20-year-old Heather Roxanne Scaggs of San Jose, who worked as an assistant printer at the same trade school where he worked. He invited Scaggs to visit him in Santa Cruz with the ruse that he wanted to sell her a used car. Before leaving for Santa Cruz, Scaggs told her mother and her boyfriend, Dan Pingle, that she was meeting with Carpenter. Aware of the murders in the area, Pingle pleaded with her not to go, but she refuted the potential danger she was in. Later in the day, once meeting up with Carpenter, he drove her to Big Basin State Park along California State Route 236, where he brandished his gun and forced her to strip. He then raped and fatally shot her once in the head. Her decomposing body would be found on May 24 by a group of hikers in Big Basin State Park. Her identity was confirmed two days later through dental records.

== Taskforce ==
In early April 1981, the police jurisdictions in Santa Cruz and Marin County combined resources in an effort to identify the Trailside Killer. A link had been established after detectives concluded that a near identical modus operandi was carried out in Hansen's murder and the murders in Marin County, and the link was confirmed through forensic firearm examination. They then sought to interview Haertle, who was believed to be the only known individual to have seen the killer's face. When interviewed, Haertle told police that the killer was a thin, balding man in his early 50s who was between 5'10" and 6' tall, wore a baseball cap, a yellow and orange windbreaker with the name "Bud" on the front patch, and horn-rimmed glasses. Another witness, Fresno resident Leland Fritz, came forward and said he saw the same man on the trail and his vehicle, which he described as a red foreign car.

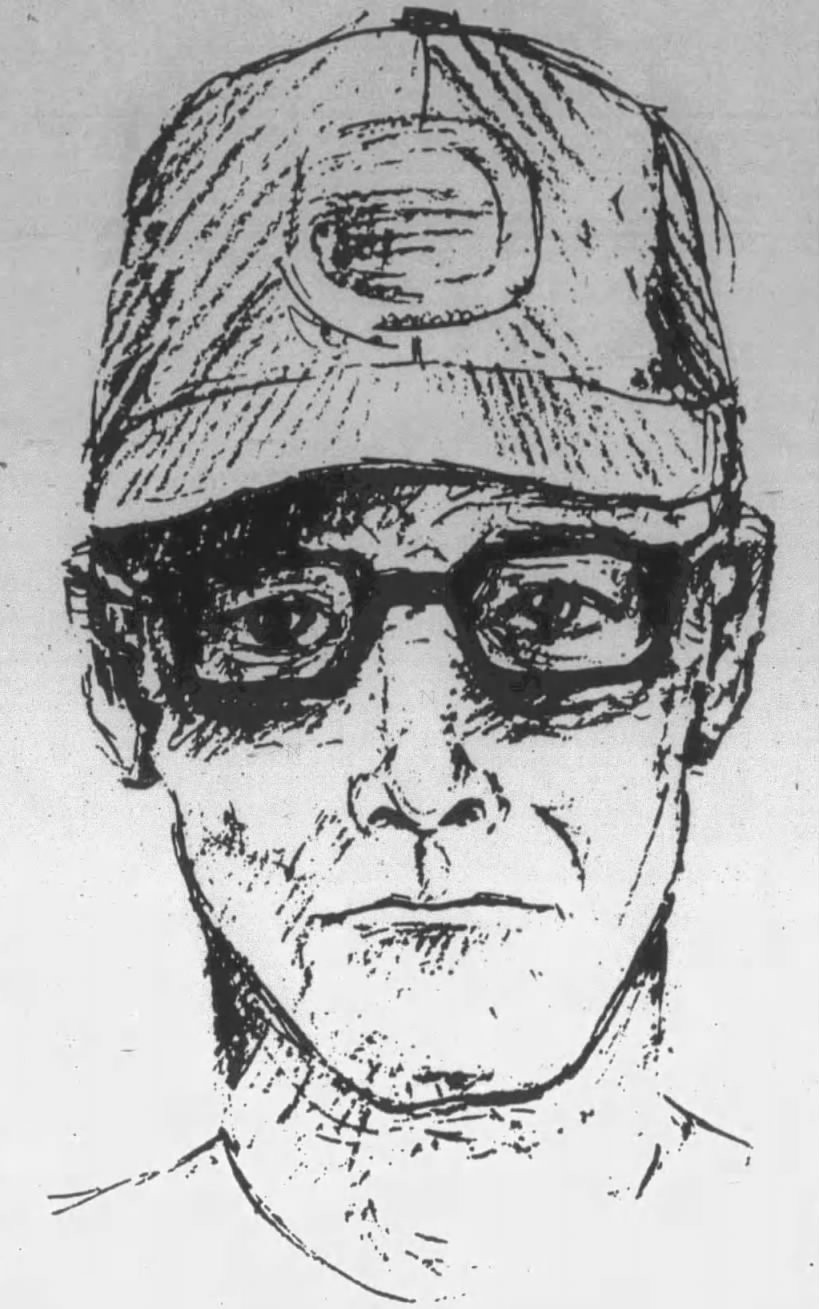
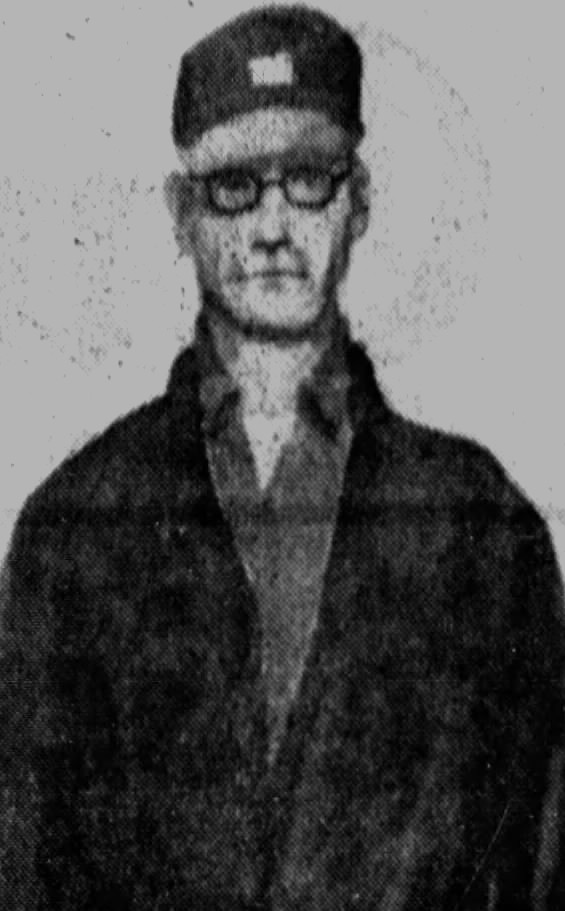
March 1981 sketches made from Haertle and Fritz's descriptions

Police were caught off guard by their statements as they had believed the killer was much younger. During the investigation in Marin County, one witness who claimed to have seen the killer described him as a white male in his late 20s or early 30s with medium-length brown hair. Sheriff Al Howenstein and the Marin County Sheriff's Office had linked this individual, dubiously, to the murders and a sketch of this man was distributed throughout northern California. Based on Haertle and Fritz's descriptions, a more accurate composite sketch was drawn by artist Dennis Dederick.

To help with the investigation, police formed a tip line for anyone with information that would function 18 hours a day. Authorities also offered up a $25,000 reward for anyone with critical information about the killer's identity to come forward. Park rangers were dispatched throughout Northern California to post up warning signs and to warn hikers to proceed with caution when entering hiking trails alone.

=== Surveillance ===
Carpenter first came to law enforcement attention following an April 4 tip by 69-year-old Ben Lomond resident Roberta Patterson, who said that he resembled the sketch of the killer. Her story to police was that she had met Carpenter in 1955 while he was working as a purser on a ship sailing to Japan and recounted him exhibiting bizarre behavior around her then 14-year-old daughter. She learned his name when he signed it in her autograph book and said she was "not surprised" when he was later mentioned in the newspaper for his 1960 and 1970 assault convictions. (Note: Patterson would die in 1984 — before Carpenter's conviction — and her estate was given $2,000 of the original $25,000 reward. The rest went to Haertle and other tipsters.)

Authorities noted that Carpenter bore a resemblance to Haertle's description of the killer, and when it was revealed that he was the last person to have had contact with Heather Scaggs, investigators put him under surveillance and covertly surveyed his home in Glen Park for a week. During their surveillance, they noted that Carpenter drove a red Fiat similar to the one Leland Fritz recalled seeing in Santa Cruz. A team of seven FBI agents began their own surveillance of Carpenter on May 12. In separate police line-ups, Haertle, Fritz, and several other individuals identified Carpenter with little hesitation.

== Arrest ==
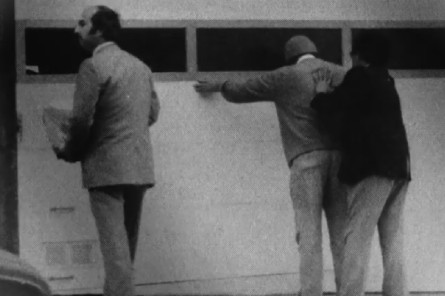
Carpenter during his arrest in San Francisco on May 14, 1981

Carpenter was arrested outside his San Francisco home on May 14, 1981. He was driven to Santa Cruz County where he was ordered held without bail as authorities sought to investigate him in the murders. Detectives issued a search warrant for his home and seized a Sierra Club book that contained maps of various California hiking trails, with paper clips conveniently marking pages containing areas where the murders occurred. Although this was strong circumstantial evidence, investigators worried this was not enough for a conviction, and Carpenter's .38 caliber revolver could not be located. On May 15, Carpenter was formally indicted with the murder of Hansen. He was not immediately indicted with Scaggs' murder as her body was not yet found, although after it was, he was charged with her murder on May 26. Carpenter pleaded not guilty to both charges.

In mid-July, investigators received an unexpected break when Shane Williams, who had recently been arrested in Los Angeles for robbery, told detectives the location where he had hidden the gun. When investigators searched the area, which was near a hiking trail, they recovered the firearm; when tested, the gun was determined to be the same one used in Hansen's murder. The gun was traced back to Mollie Purnell; when police went to question her, she initially told them what Carpenter coerced her to say and claimed it had been stolen from her. When police threatened to indict her as an accomplice to murder, she recanted and told them she had indeed gifted it to Carpenter.

On July 31, Carpenter was indicted in Marin County with the five murders, after his firearm was seized by investigators who determined that the bullet shells recovered at the crime scenes there undoubtedly originated from his gun. In total, Carpenter was faced with seven murder charges, two rape charges, and one attempted rape charge. Santa Cruz District Attorney Arthur Danner requested that the murder trials in relation to the deaths of Hansen and Scaggs be combined. A preliminary hearing began on September 21, and the presiding Judge William A. Kelsay granted the defense's motion to prohibit the press from the courtroom during the three-week inquiry.

=== Additional investigations ===
Following Carpenter's arrest, the parents of 17-year-old Anna Kelly Menjivar, a Mercy High School student who had gone missing in Daly City in December 1980, asked investigators to look into Carpenter for her case. Daly City police had initially concluded Menjivar was a runaway but revelations that Carpenter frequented a bank where she worked diverted the case and it was investigated as a potential homicide. Menjivar's skull and other bones were found off of Route 35 in June 1981, but the condition she was found in made it unlikely for her cause of death to be determined.

In addition, Carpenter was also suspected in the murders of Jennifer McDowell and Diane Steffy, both of whom were strangled to death in the Santa Cruz Mountains in 1979, but he was cleared as a suspect in both cases. Before Carpenter's identification, it was theorized that the Trailside Killer could have been the infamous Zodiac Killer who reemerged after eight years of silence. The link was ruled out after his arrest due to him being imprisoned during several of the Zodiac murders.

== Trials ==
=== Los Angeles County ===
In 1982, the California Superior Court granted the defense's motion for a change of venue for the Santa Cruz trial, citing the risk that the high publicity surrounding the case could affect jury selection, and agreed it would be relocated to Southern California. The defense and prosecutors eventually settled to move the case to Los Angeles County before Superior Court Judge Dion Morrow. After several delays throughout 1983, on May 24, 1984, Carpenter's trial for the murders of Ellen Hansen and Heather Scaggs and the attempted murder of Steven Haertle was opened at the Criminal Courts Building (now known as Clara Shortridge Foltz Criminal Justice Center).

Danner sought the death penalty for Carpenter if convicted. During opening statements, he outlined the murder of Ellen Hansen and Steven Haertle's wounding and later identification of Carpenter: "You will hear him identify David Carpenter as the person who held the gun, and how he could see the bullets in the chamber. He will have to relive a nightmare in his life, but you will hear him tell you without equivocation that David Carpenter is the man who killed Ellen and then wounded him to within two inches of his life." Danner also told the jury how Heather Scaggs had told her boyfriend that she was meeting with Carpenter shortly before she was murdered. In the defense's opening statements, Santa Cruz County Public Defender Steve Wright warned both juries to beware of "speculation, hunches and suspicion" by the prosecution and that their claims could all be argued away on cross examination.

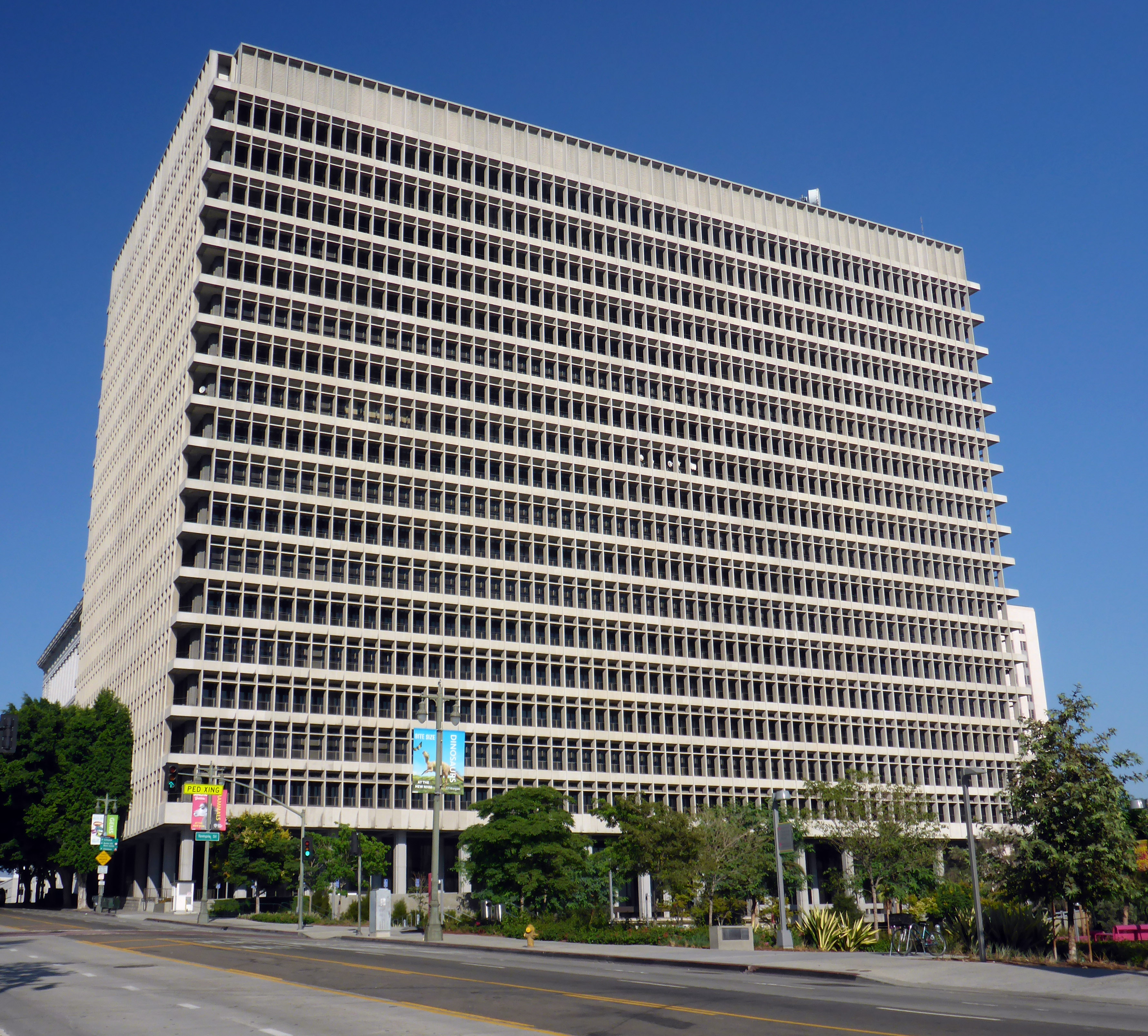
The Clara Shortridge Foltz Criminal Justice Center in Los Angeles, where the trial took place

Danner summoned Haertle to the witness stand and asked him to identify his attacker, to which Haertle pointed at Carpenter with no hesitation. Haertle testified that on the day he and Hansen were attacked, they were first approached by Carpenter at gunpoint, who ordered them down the trail into a secluded area. He said that Carpenter pointed toward Hansen and told her "I want to rape you", and when she told him no, he walked both further down the trail until he began firing. In a husky voice, Haertle said that the neck wound he sustained left him with severe nerve damage to his vocal cords and eye.

A centerpiece of the prosecution's case was the ballistics evidence tying Carpenter's firearm to the bullets found at the crime scenes, and they called up Mike Waller, a criminologist for the Santa Rosa Crime Laboratory, who testified that he analyzed the bullets found in the bodies of Hansen and Scaggs and determined they came from Carpenter's .38 caliber revolver. He added that the gun was also tied to bullets found at the Marin County crime scenes. The defense had no rebuttal. Instead, the defense chose to argue that the sperm evidence tying Carpenter to the murder of Scaggs was weak since it had allegedly been deposited a day before her death.

During closing arguments on July 3, the defense stunned the courtroom when one of Carpenter's lawyers, Larry Biggam, admitted that his client had killed both victims but said "that will not be an issue in your deliberations", citing Carpenter's competency instead. In his rebuttal, Danner said that the defense's admission of Carpenter's guilt was tantamount to his guilt in the Marin County murders as well. The jury was allowed recess for the July 4 holiday and deliberated for just over eight hours on July 5 and found Carpenter guilty on two counts of murder, one count of attempted murder, one count of rape, and one count of attempted rape, with the jury finding that his convictions had met the special circumstances allowing him to be eligible for the death penalty.

The defense and prosecution readjourned on August 15 for the start of the penalty phase. The prosecutors called up 18-year-old Tina Marie Vance, whom Carpenter had been acquainted with. She testified that she was 14 when she met Carpenter in 1980, and during a car ride from Fresno to San Francisco he showed her his briefcase containing a gun, wires, ropes and a gag, claiming to use them to "scare people". Prosecutors elaborated on Vance's testimony by showing jurors morgue photos of one of the victims in Marin County, who had something tied tightly around her neck. Although the defense objected, Judge Marrow overruled them.

The defense argued circumstances surrounding Carpenter's childhood and summoned two childhood friends to the witness stand. Both recounted how Carpenter's mother would beat and prohibit him from playing outside, instead forcing him take violin lessons. Another defense witness, child abuse expert Jo Ann Cook, testified that based on interviews with Carpenter, his parents, and state records, the abuse he suffered led him to commit a life of crime. On behalf of the prosecution, Thomas Szasz, a professor of psychiatry from Syracuse, New York, disagreed and testified that although a bad childhood could shape a person's personality, it does not influence their decision-making skills.

In one of his final statements to the jury, Danner called Carpenter an "efficient serial killer" who shot his rape victims so they could not testify against him, and as he spoke, photographs of all the victims were displayed in the courtroom. In the defense's final statement, Carpenter's lawyer Larry Biggam remarked, "As Gandhi once said, an eye for an eye eventually makes the whole world blind". The jury formally began deliberations on September 28. Despite a plea from the defense to consider Carpenter's possible mental or emotional disturbance, they ordered him to be sentenced to die in the gas chamber on October 5, marking the end of the five-month trial. His sentence was formally imposed by Judge Morrow on November 16, who said to Carpenter, "I must conclude with the prosecution that if ever there was a case for the death penalty, this is that case." On November 26, he was moved to death row at San Quentin State Prison.

=== San Diego County ===
Three weeks after his sentencing, on December 5, Carpenter was arraigned in Marin County for the murders committed there, where he agreed to the appointment of public defender Frank Cox as his attorney. His preliminary hearing was delayed for several months so Cox could study the 20,000-page transcript of the Los Angeles County trial. In early 1986, Cox advised Carpenter to plead guilty to the five murder charges, which angered him and he fired Cox, but rehired him not long after. In September of that year, Carpenter's trial for the five murders in Marin County was moved to San Diego County before Superior Court Judge Herbert Hoffman.

Carpenter's defense opted for an unusual plea of double jeopardy since both the prosecution and Judge Morrow from the Los Angeles County trial had said there was "overwhelming evidence" of Carpenter's guilt in the Marin County murders—cases he had yet to be tried for—and thus was a violation of state law. A hearing on the matter was denied by the Supreme Court of California. Carpenter's trial for the murders of Richard Stowers, Cynthia Moreland, Shauna May, Diane O'Connell and Anne Alderson commenced on January 5, 1988.

Marin County Deputy District Attorney John Posey, who acted as head prosecutor, sought the death penalty. During opening statements, Posey outlined each of the victims' final moments, as well their last contact with their families. The prosecution called up Shane Williams, whom law enforcement had agreed to not prosecute as an accessory to murder, who testified that Carpenter gifted him his .38 caliber revolver at a warehouse in San Francisco days prior to his arrest. Williams' testimony was called into question by the defense, who argued that none of the detectives who had surveyed Carpenter in the days before his arrest had recalled him interacting with Williams.

In April, Carpenter took the stand in his own defense. He struggled to speak clearly due to his stutter but testified that Purnell was not being truthful about her claim that she loaned him the gun later used in the murders and also claimed he was in Redwood City when several of them occurred. After one day of deliberations, on May 10, 1988, the jury convicted Carpenter on five counts of first-degree murder. He was found guilty of raping two of the women and attempting to rape a third. The jury rendered a death verdict on June 27, which Judge Hoffman formally imposed on July 19.

== Aftermath ==
One of Carpenter's initial pastimes on death row was corresponding with the Point Reyes Light newspaper in a series of letters, where he recounted the events of his life, answered readers' questions, and criticized the CDCR management. In an interview with journalist David V. Mitchell, he continued to divert blame for the Trailside murders and said that during that time he was only guilty of selling drugs.

Al Howenstein, the Marin County Sheriff at the time, lost re-election in 1982. His loss was attributed to his handling of the Mount Tam Killer investigation for which he was criticized, particularly for putting too much emphasis on the March 1980 sketch that later turned out to be inaccurate.

Carpenter filed his first appeal in September 1988 after learning that a juror during the San Diego trial had been improperly informed of his criminal record. The following year, the California Superior Court ruled in his favor and overturned the convictions. The Marin County District Attorney fought the ruling and the case was heard by the U.S. Supreme Court in 1994, who overruled the ruling and reinstated the convictions. Another appeal was declined by the California Supreme Court. In 1995, the Santa Cruz convictions were overturned due to juror misconduct, but the California Supreme Court later reinstated the convictions. He again attempted to appeal his death sentence for the Marin County convictions in 1999 but failed.

In 2009, the San Francisco Police Department reexamined evidence from the 1979 murder of Mary Bennett and a DNA sample obtained from the evidence was matched to Carpenter through state Department of Justice files. Subsequently, in February 2010, police confirmed the match with a recently obtained sample from Carpenter.

Carpenter became California's oldest death row inmate in 2006 after Clarence Ray Allen was executed. He remained on death row awaiting execution until 2019, when California Governor Gavin Newsom instituted a moratorium on executions in California. Ron Moreland, the father of Marin County victim Cynthia Moreland, spoke of his disappointment but acknowledged that he worried about "biases" with the death penalty that could possibly have helped convict innocent individuals.

In 2023, it was announced that San Quentin would be repurposed as a rehabilitation center. While California no longer has a literal "death row" in the traditional sense, Carpenter remains under sentence of death. In September 2024, he contracted COVID-19 and was moved to an isolation unit and recovered within days. Given his inability to walk and deteriorating interaction struggles, he was moved to California Health Care Facility (CHCF) in Stockton in May 2025.

== Media ==
=== Literature ===
- Graysmith, Robert (1990). The Sleeping Lady: The Trailside Murders Above The Golden Gate. New York: Onyx. ISBN 0-45140255-3.
- Schechter, Harold (2003), The Serial Killer Files: The Who, What, Where, How, and Why of the World's Most Terrifying Murderers, Ballantine Books, ISBN 978-0-345-46566-5
- Maynard, Joyce (2013). After Her. New York: HarperLuxe. ISBN 9-78006225742-0.

=== Television ===
- The New Detectives S04E08 "Body Count" (1998). Narrated by Gene Galusha.
- Born to Kill? S06E11 "David Carpenter: The Trailside Killer" (2014). Directed by Matt Grosch.
- Very Scary People S05E02/03 "The Trailside Killer" (2023). Aired in two-parts.

== See also ==
- List of serial killers in the United States
- List of death row inmates in the United States § California
