= Bellatrix (disambiguation) =

Bellatrix is the feminine form of bellator, the Latin word for warrior. It can also mean:

- Bellatrix (Gamma Orionis), a star in the constellation of Orion
- Bellatrix (band) (1992–2001), a former Icelandic rock band
- Bellatrix, French Navy minesweeping sloop, launched 29 May 1916
- USS Bellatrix, a name common to several ships
  - USS Bellatrix (AK-20/AKA-3) (1942–1991), an amphibious cargo ship of the United States Navy
  - USS Bellatrix (AF-62) (1961–1968), a combat stores ship of the United States Navy
  - USNS Bellatrix (T-AKR-288) (1973– ), a ship of the United States Navy
- Bellatrix Lestrange, a character from the Harry Potter novels
- Bellatrix Aerospace, an Indian private aerospace manufacturer and small satellite company
- Bellatrix Female Warriors, a British Women's professional wrestling promotion
- Bellatrix - former UK and World Beatbox Champion
- Bellatrix, the codename for a cancelled implementation of the IBM Amazon instruction set architecture.
