= Galusha =

Galusha has been used as both a given name and surname. Notable people with the name include:

== Given name ==
- Galusha Anderson (1832–1918), American theologian
- Galusha A. Grow (1822–1907), American politician, lawyer, writer and businessman
- Galusha Pennypacker (1844–1916), Union general during the American Civil War

== Surname ==
- Elon Galusha (1790–1856), American lawyer and Baptist preacher
- Gene Galusha (1941–2008), Jewish-American actor and narrator
- Jonas Galusha (1753–1834), American politician, Governor of Vermont
- Kerry Galusha (born 1977), Canadian curler

== See also ==
- Galusha House, a Federal-style house in Jericho, Vermont
