= USS Bellatrix =

USS Bellatrix may refer to the following ships operated by the United States:

- USS Bellatrix (AKA-3), an attack cargo ship commissioned in 1942; transferred to Peru in 1963; scrapped in 1991.
- USS Bellatrix (AF-62), commissioned 18 November 1961 at Puget Sound Naval Shipyard, Bremerton, Washington.
- SS Bellatrix (T-AKR-288), a ship of the Military Sealift Command, delivered in 1973.
