= Merapi =

Merapi may refer to:

- Mount Merapi, an active volcano in Central Java, Indonesia
  - 2010 eruptions of Mount Merapi
- Mount Marapi (also known as Mount Merapi), an active volcano in West Sumatra, Indonesia
- the stratovolcano Mount Merapi, part of the Ijen volcano complex in Eastern Java, Indonesia
- 536 Merapi, an asteroid
- USS Merapi (AF-38) an Adria-class stores ship acquired in 1945 by the United States Navy for service in World War 2.
