= USS Arequipa =

Cargo ship of the United States Navy

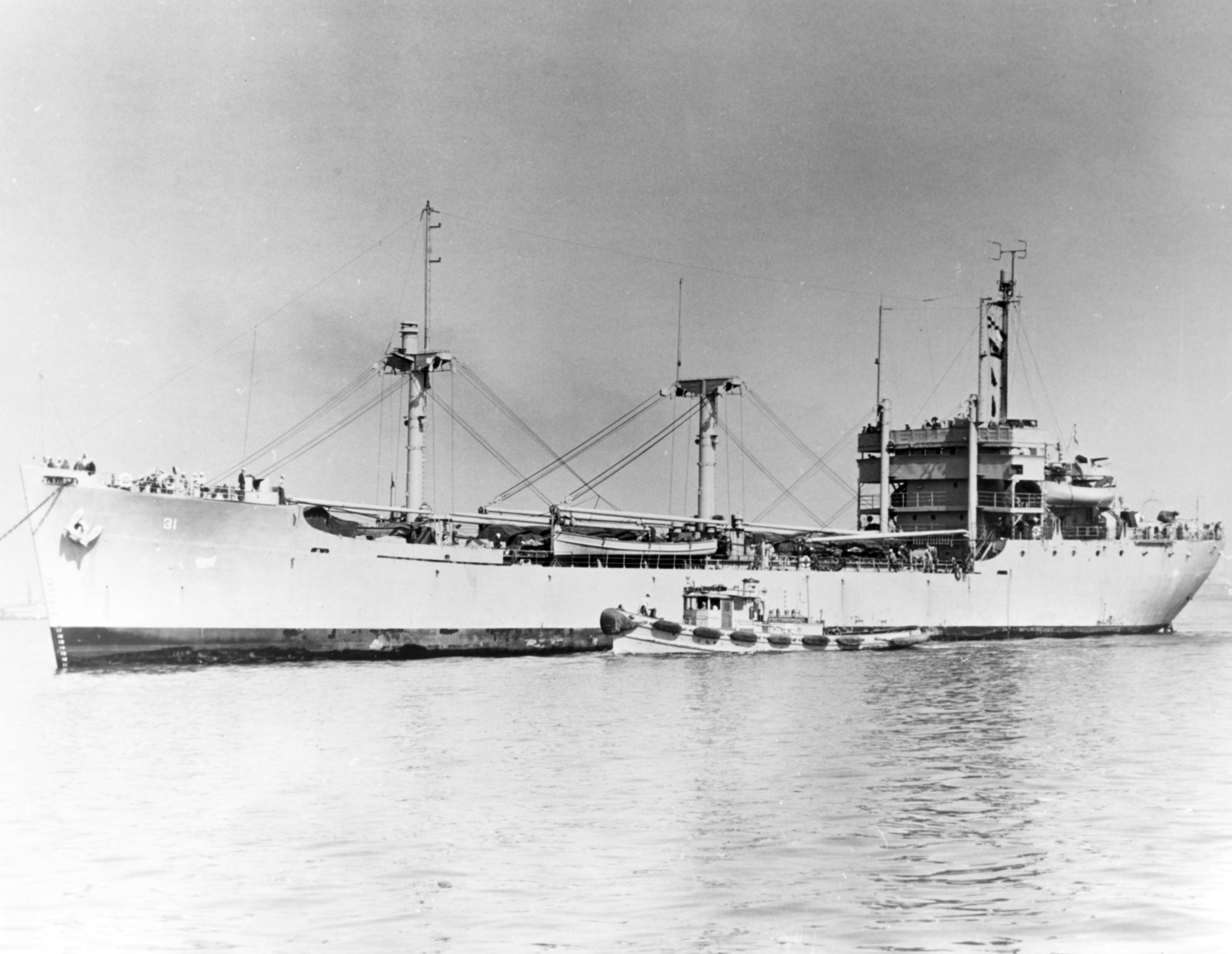
- Arequipa in 1951

History

United States
- Ordered: as R1-M-AV3 hull, MC hull 2195
- Laid down: 17 January 1944
- Launched: 4 May 1944
- Acquired: 19 December 1944
- Commissioned: 14 January 1945
- Decommissioned: 25 August 1955
- Stricken: 1 September 1961
- Fate: Sunk as artificial reef

General characteristics
- Tonnage: 2,120 long tons deadweight (DWT)
- Displacement: 3,139 t.(lt) 6,240 t.(fl)
- Length: 338 ft (103 m)
- Beam: 50 ft (15 m)
- Draught: 18 ft (5.5 m)
- Propulsion: diesel engine, single screw, 1,700shp
- Speed: 12 kts. (max)
- Complement: 84
- Armament: one single 3 in (76 mm) dual purpose gun mount, six single 20 mm gun mounts

USS Arequipa (AF-31) was an Adria class stores ship stores ship in service with the United States Navy from 1945 to 1955. She was sold in 1972 and later sunk as an artificial reef.

== History ==
Arequipa was laid down on 17 January 1944 under a Maritime Commission contract (MC hull 2195) by Pennsylvania Shipyards, Inc., at Beaumont, Texas; launched on 4 May 1944; sponsored by Mrs. L. Osius; transferred to the Navy on 19 December 1944; towed to Todd Shipyards in Galveston, Texas, for conversion; and commissioned on 14 January 1945.

=== World War II ===
After a brief shakedown in the Gulf of Mexico followed by a short availability, the store ship departed Galveston on 31 January and steamed to Mobile, Alabama, to receive her initial load. She departed the United States on 7 February as part of Service Squadron 9 and shuttled provisions to various ships and shore activities throughout the Pacific Ocean, primarily in the Philippine Islands, the Admiralty Islands, and the Netherlands East Indies.

Before the end of October 1945, Arequipa had serviced 905 ships and 41 shore activities and travelled over 35,000 miles. On 19 December, she went into drydock at Manicani Island in Leyte Gulf.

=== Cold War ===
Following overhaul, Arequipa returned to the United States and picked up provisions in San Francisco, California, for delivery to ports throughout the Pacific Islands, Japan, and China. From May 1946 until November 1954, the stores ship delivered supplies, almost without interruption except for periodic repair and overhaul.

=== Decommissioning and fate ===
Arequipa underwent a pre-inactivation overhaul at Pearl Harbor from November 1954 to June 1955 and then steamed to San Diego, California, to join the Pacific Reserve Fleet. She was decommissioned on 25 August 1955, and her name was struck from the Navy list on 1 September 1961. She was sold in December 1972 to Star-Kist Foods, Inc., of Terminal Island, California, for non-transportation use. The Arequipa was toured by a former crewman, Don King USN (Ret), in San Diego prior to being towed offshore and scuttled to become an artificial reef.

== Military awards and honors ==
Arequipa received one battle star for the Korean War conflict. Her crew was eligible for the following medals:

- American Campaign Medal
- Asiatic-Pacific Campaign Medal
- World War II Victory Medal
- Navy Occupation Service Medal (with Asia clasp)
- National Defense Service Medal
- Korean Service Medal (1)
- Philippines Liberation Medal
- United Nations Service Medal
- Republic of Korea War Service Medal (retroactive)
