= USS Karin =

Cargo ship of the United States Navy

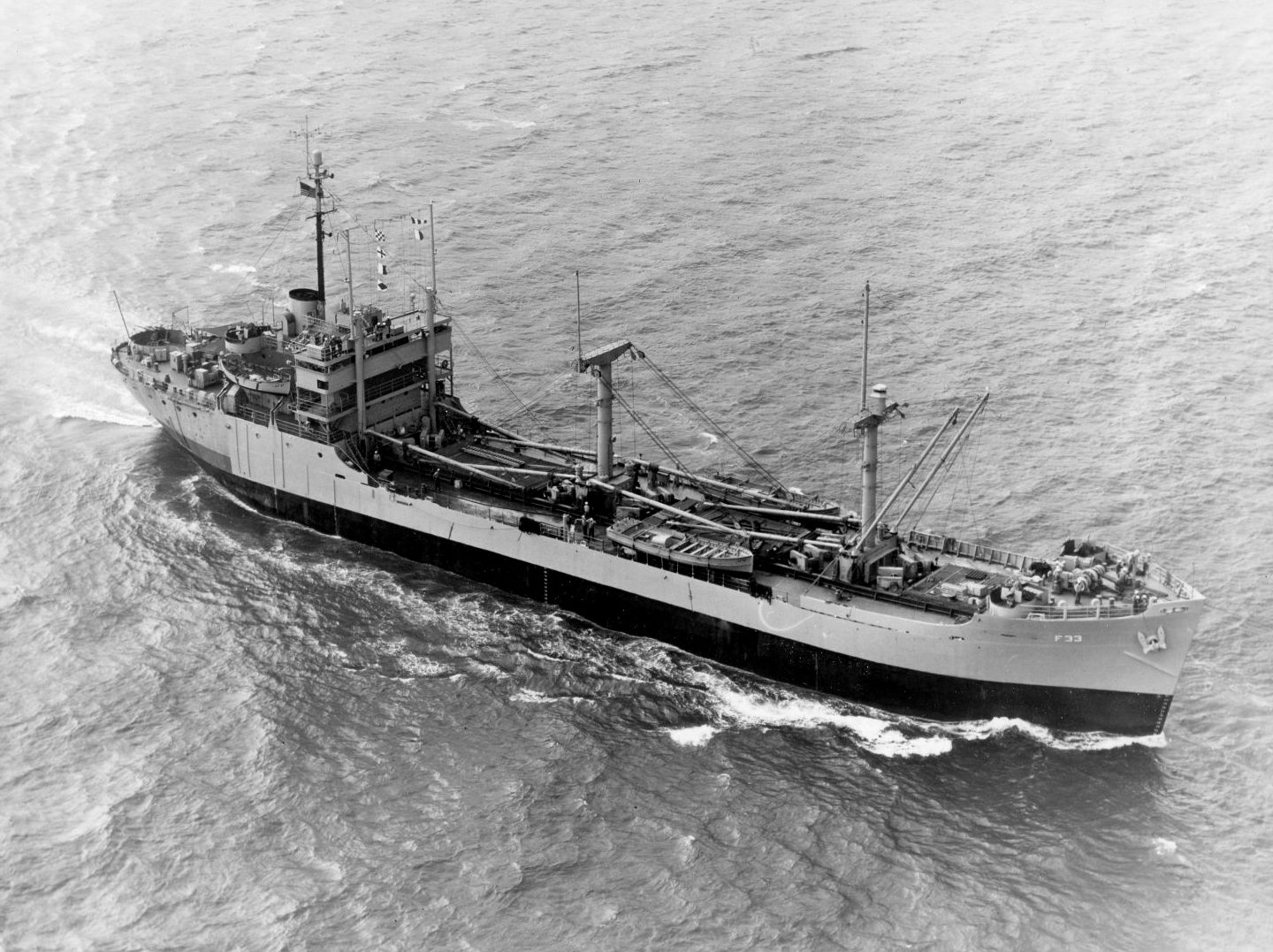

History

United States
- Ordered: as R1-M-AV3 hull, MC hull 2197
- Laid down: date unknown
- Launched: 22 June 1944
- Acquired: 5 February 1945
- Commissioned: 5 February 1945
- Decommissioned: 15 December 1958
- Stricken: September 1961
- Identification: IMO number: 7017557
- Fate: Scrapped, 1987

General characteristics
- Tonnage: 2,120 long tons deadweight (DWT)
- Displacement: 3,139 t.(lt) 6,240 t.(fl)
- Length: 338 ft (103 m)
- Beam: 50 ft (15 m)
- Draught: 18 ft (5.5 m)
- Propulsion: diesel engine, single screw, 1,700shp
- Speed: 12 kts. (max)
- Complement: 84
- Armament: one single 3 in (76 mm) dual purpose gun mount, six single 20 mm gun mounts

USS Karin (AF-33) was an Adria stores ship in service with the United States Navy from 1945 to 1958. She was into commercial service in 1969 and was scrapped in 1987.

== History ==
Karin was launched 22 June 1944 by Pennsylvania Shipyard Inc., Beaumont, Texas, under a United States Maritime Commission contract; sponsored by Mrs. E. M. Ratcliff; acquired by the Navy and commissioned 3 February 1945.

=== World War II ===
After a brief shakedown in the Gulf of Mexico, Karin loaded cargo at Mobile, Alabama, sailed through the Panama Canal, and arrived Pearl Harbor 23 March 1945. She departed 4 April with food for the U.S. Pacific Fleet and discharged cargo at Eniwetok and Saipan. For the closing months of the war, the store ship made two additional cruises from Pearl Harbor to Saipan and Ulithi.

=== Cold War ===
After the end of the war, Karin carried supplies to occupation forces in the western Pacific. Early in November she steamed to the assistance of USS Bridge (AF-1) after the other store ship had struck a mine off Korea. After salvaging the ship's cargo and distributing it at Pusan and Jinsen, she got underway on the 22d for Seattle, Washington, arriving 21 December.

From 1946 to 1950 Karin made cruises from San Francisco to the mid-Pacific and the Far East, supplying the fleet with fresh and frozen provisions.

=== Korean War ===
During the summer of 1950, Karin was in the Far East when Communist forces invaded South Korea. She remained in the area until January 1951, provisioning U.S. and U.N. ships operating there. After returning to San Francisco, California, 19 February for overhaul at Mare Island, California, she resumed provisioning cruises to the Marshalls and Pearl Harbor.

On 7 January 1952 Karin departed San Francisco and resumed supply operations out of Japan in early February. She made runs between Sasebo and Yokosuka, and two cruises to Pusan and Inchon, Korea. Karin returned to San Francisco 18 December to prepare for provisioning duties in the mid-Pacific.

=== Special Indo-China operations ===
During 1954 her home port was changed from Mare Island to Pearl Harbor. She arrived Sasebo, Japan 17 June for operations in the Far East. While there, Karin was assigned to special duty in Indochina and from 25 August to mid October participated in Operation Passage to Freedom. During this period more than 100,000 Vietnamese men, women, and children were evacuated from the Communist dominated North to the free world in the south. Karin assisted this gigantic population transfer by supplying many ships with fresh and frozen foods while providing the Vietnamese with rice and small essentials.

Karin returned Pearl Harbor 10 November to prepare for her regular duties. From 1955 to 1958 she made 18 cruises to the mid-Pacific with provisions and supplies.

=== Decommissioning and fate ===
Karin departed Pearl Harbor 25 September 1958, arriving Astoria, Oregon, 6 October; and decommissioned there 15 December 1958. She was transferred to War Shipping Administration and struck from the Navy List September 1961. She was placed in the National Defense Reserve Fleet and was berthed at Puget Sound, Olympia, Washington. In September 1961, she was struck from the Naval Vessel Register. Final Disposition: she was sold by the Maritime Administration in 1969 and converted into a drillship and renamed Typhoon. She was finally broken up at Gadani Beach, Pakistan, in 1987.

== Military awards and honors ==
Karin received two battle stars for Korean War service:

- Communist China Aggression (22 to 31 December 1950)
- Third Korean Winter (21 to 24 May 1952, 14 to 15 August 1952)

Her crew was eligible for the following medals:

- American Campaign Medal
- Asiatic–Pacific Campaign Medal
- World War II Victory Medal
- Navy Occupation Service Medal (with Asia clasp)
- National Defense Service Medal
- Korean Service Medal (2)
- Armed Forces Expeditionary Medal
- United Nations Korean Service Medal
- Korean War Service Medal (retroactive)
