= USS Athanasia =

Cargo ship of the United States Navy

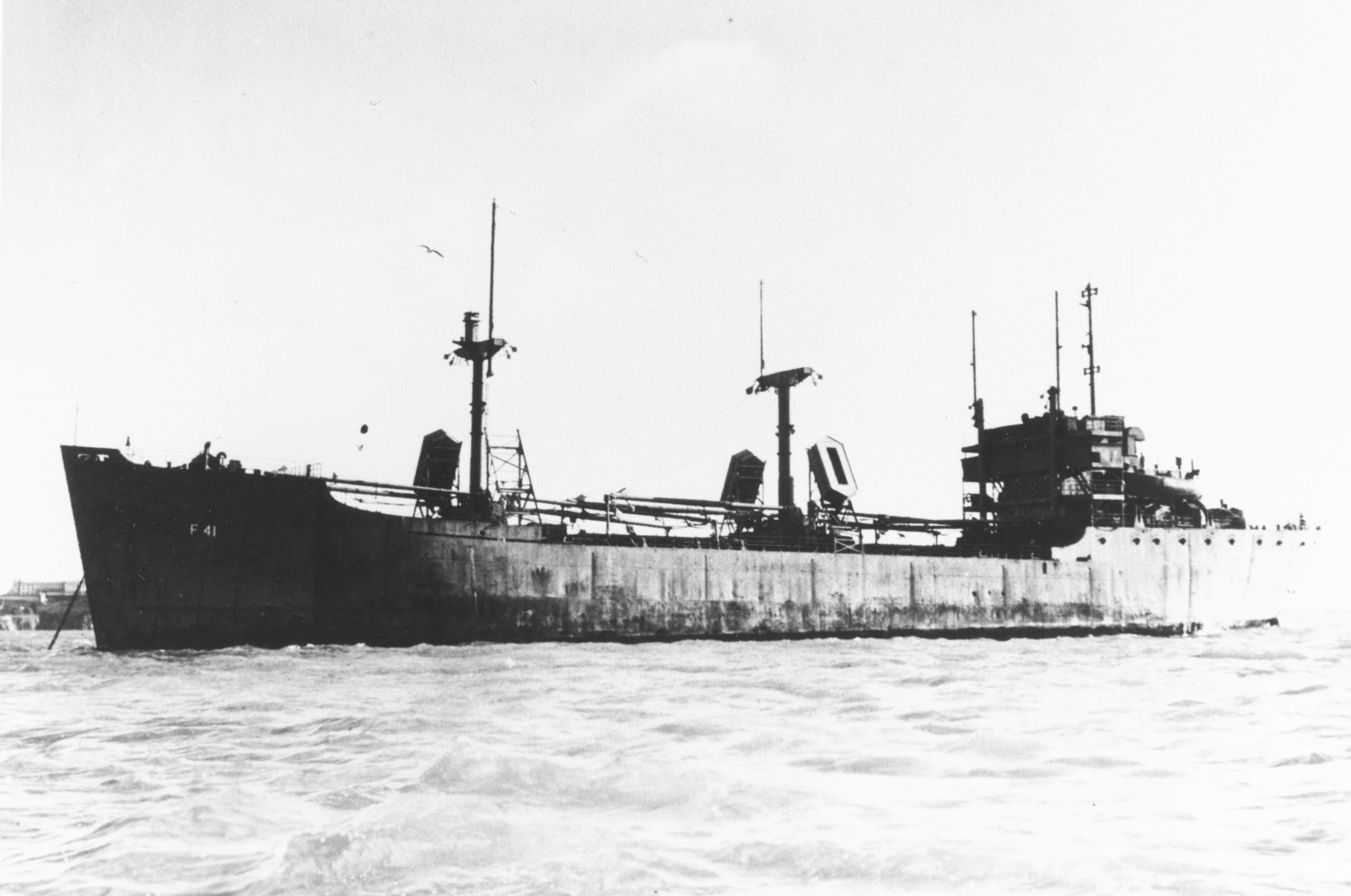
- Athanasia in San Francisco Bay, California, c. 1945.

History

United States
- Ordered: as Stevedore Knot, R1-M-AV3 hull, MC 2332
- Laid down: 14 August 1944
- Launched: 12 October 1944
- Commissioned: 3 April 1945
- Decommissioned: 20 December 1945
- Stricken: 8 January 1946
- Identification: IMO number: 5028265
- Fate: Scrapped (date unknown)

General characteristics
- Tonnage: 2,120 long tons deadweight (DWT)
- Displacement: 3,139 t.(lt) 6,240 t.(fl)
- Length: 338 ft (103 m)
- Beam: 50 ft (15 m)
- Draught: 18 ft (5.5 m)
- Propulsion: diesel engine, single screw, 1,700shp
- Speed: 12 kts. (max)
- Complement: 84
- Armament: one single 3 in (76 mm) dual purpose gun mount, six single 20 mm gun mounts

USS Athanasia (AF-41) was an Adria-class stores ship in service with the United States Navy in 1945. She was sold into commercial service in 1977.

== History ==
Athanasia was laid down under a Maritime Commission contract (MC hull 2332) on 14 August 1944 at Beaumont, Texas, by the Pennsylvania Shipyards, Inc.; launched on 12 October 1944; sponsored by Mrs. E. C. Sloat: acquired by the Navy on 13 March 1945; converted for naval service by the Todd Galveston Dry Dock, Inc., Galveston, Texas; and commissioned at Galveston on 3 April 1945.

Following brief shakedown training in the Gulf of Mexico, the new cargo ship proceeded to Mobile, Alabama, to take on provisions. On 26 April, Athanasia sailed for the Pacific Ocean. She transited the Panama Canal on 3 May and continued on to Hawaii. The vessel reached Pearl Harbor on the 22d and reported to Service Squadron 8 for duty. Athanasia left Pearl Harbor on 29 May, bound for the Marshall Islands. She arrived at Eniwetok on 4 June and began discharging provisions. Eight days later, the ship got underway for Ulithi. At that atoll, she joined a convoy bound for the Ryukyus. On 26 June, the ships reached Kerama Retto and began discharging dry and frozen provisions to ships of the Fleet. Athanasia then moved to Hagushi Bay, Okinawa, and continued her resupply duties. On 12 July, the cargo ship set out in a convoy for the return voyage to Hawaii.

After a two-day pause en route at Ulithi, Athanasia moored at Pearl Harbor on 4 August and began reloading her holds. Four days later, she shaped a course back to Okinawa via Ulithi. While she was still en route, she received word of the Japanese capitulation. The ship arrived at Buckner Bay, Okinawa, on 4 September. Departing on the 12th, Athanasia joined a convoy for Pearl Harbor. She had a brief layover at Saipan in mid-September, then pressed on toward Hawaii. However, the ship was diverted to Seattle, Washington. During a dense fog encountered off British Columbia, Athanasia grounded on the rocks of Bajo Point, Nootka Island, on 12 October. Salvage operations were conducted, and the ship was refloated on the 21st. She was then towed to Seattle for repairs.

On 20 December 1945 the ship was decommissioned and was returned to the War Shipping Administration for disposal. Her name was struck from the Navy list on 8 January 1946. She was sold on 26 June 1977 to Northwest Diesel Repair Inc. Final Disposition: scrapped (date unknown).

== Military awards and honors ==
Athanasia earned one battle star for her World War II service. Her crew was eligible for the following:

- American Campaign Medal
- Asiatic-Pacific Campaign Medal (1)
- World War II Victory Medal
