= Type R ship =

US Navy ship classification

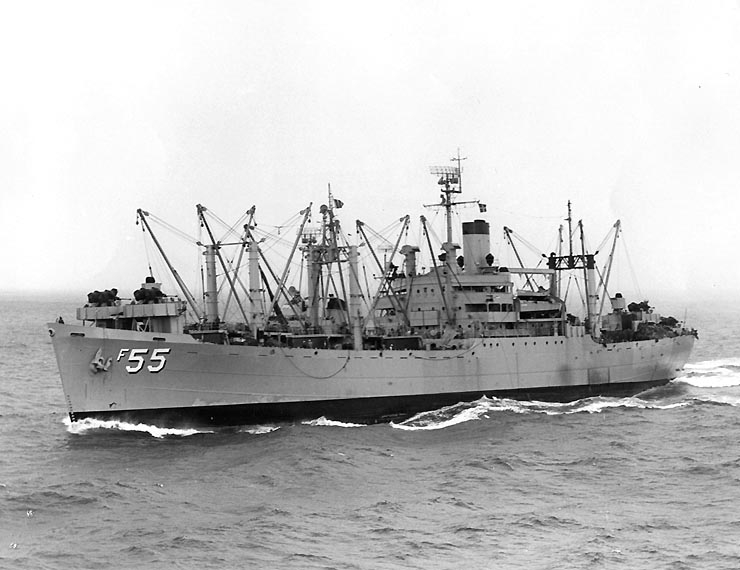
USS Aludra (AF-55) (built as SS Matchless a type R2-S-BV1 ship) at sea, 17 September 1954

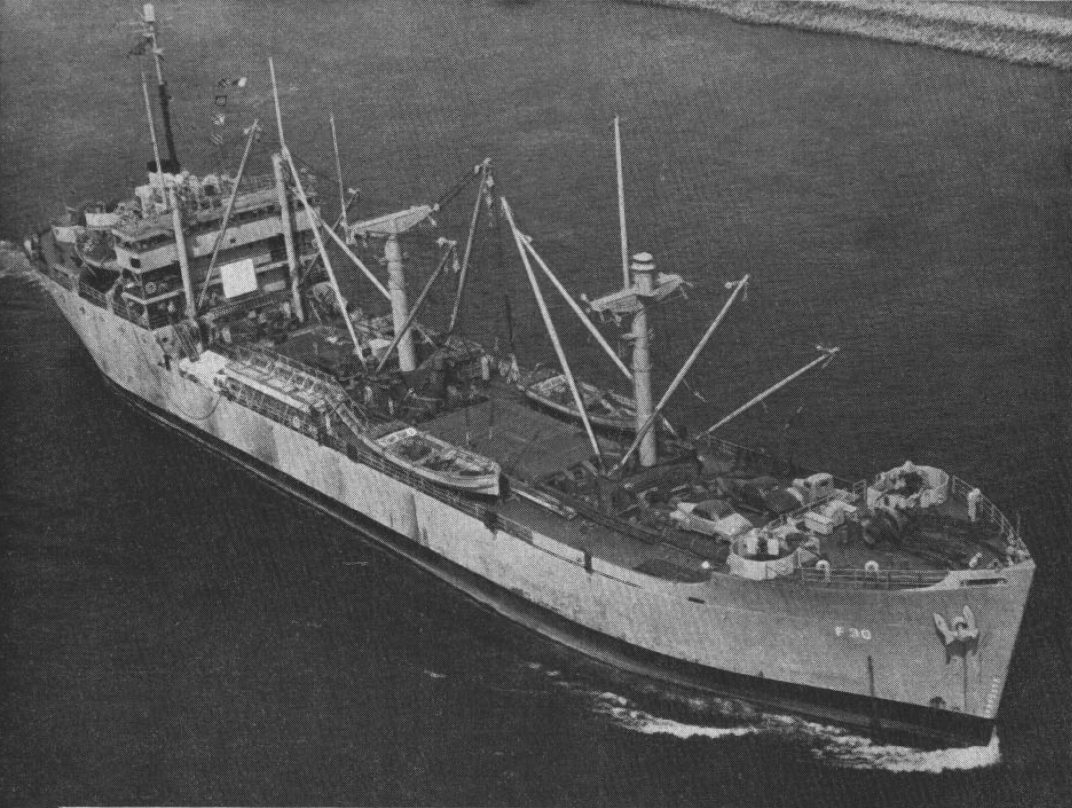
SS Adria (AF-30), a type R1-M-AV3 Adria-class ship, in 1949

The Type R ship is a United States Maritime Administration (MARAD) designation for World War II refrigerated cargo ship, also called a reefer ship. The R type ship was used in World War II, Korean War, Vietnam War and the Cold War. Type R ships were used to transport perishable commodities which require temperature-controlled transportation, such as fruit, meat, fish, vegetables, dairy products and other foods. The US Maritime Commission ordered 41 new refrigerated ships for the US Navy. Because of the difficulty of building refrigerated ships only two were delivered in 1944, and just 26 were delivered in 1945 and the remainder in 1946–48. The 41 R type ships were built in four groups. Two of design types were modified type C1 ships and two were modified type C2 ships. The United Fruit Company operated many of the R type ships in World War II. The type R2-S-BV1 became the US Navy Alstede-class stores ship and the type R1-M-AV3 became the US Navy Adria-class stores ship.

== Ships in type ==
=== R2-S-BV1 ===
R2-S-BV1 Alstede-class stores ship, 5,008 DWT, built by Moore Dry Dock Company of Oakland, California in 1945. Used carrying frozen meat to Allied forces in World War II. Hull is close to C2-SU type ships. Displacement: 6,319 t.(lt), length: 469 ft (143 m), beam: 63 ft (19 m), draft: 26 ft (7.9 m), speed: 15 knots (28 km/h; 17 mph) max., crew complement: 64, propulsion: cross-compound turbines, single propeller.

- SS Matchless renamed USS Aludra in 1952
- SS Flying Dragon Scrapped 1974
- SS Ocean Chief renamed USS Alstede in 1946
- SS Fleetwood renamed USS Bellatrix in 1961
- SS Contest Scrapped 1973
- SS Golden Rocket renamed USS Zelima in 1946
- SS Golden Eagle renamed USS Arcturus sunk as a target on 24 July 1997

=== R2-ST-AU1 ===
R2-ST-AU1 6,148 DWT, built by Gulf Shipbuilding Corporation in Chickasaw, Alabama in 1945–1946. Also had accommodations for twelve passengers in six cabins. Owned by the United Mail Steamship Company. Ships were operated by United Fruit Company / Great White Fleet.

- SS Fra Berlanga scrapped 1971
- SS San Jose scrapped 1976
- SS Limon later sold to NV Caribbean Shipping of Rotterdam and renamed SS Talamanca, scrapped in 1977
- SS Esparta scrapped 1977
- SS Junior scrapped 1975
- SS Comayagua scrapped 1975

=== R1-M-AV3 ===
R1-M-AV3 Adria-class ship, 7,435 DWT, built by Pennsylvania Shipyards, Inc. in Beaumont, Texas in 1944–1945, Hull was close to a type C1-M-AV1. Specs: 12 knots (22 km/h; 14 mph) max, length: 338 ft (103 m), beam: 50 ft (15 m), draught: 18 ft (5.5 m), diesel engine, single screw, 1,700 shp (1,300 kW).

- USS Adria
- USS Arequipa Sold in 1972 became fish factory ship
- USS Corduba
- USS Karin
- USS Kerstin
- USS Latona
- USS Lioba
- USS Malabar
- USS Merapi Sold in 1966 became fish factory ship
- USS Palisana
- SS Flemish Bend renamed USS Bondia
- SS Whale Knot renamed USS Gordonia
- SS Wall and Crown renamed USS Laurentia
- USS Lucidor
- SS Stevedore Knot renamed USS Athanasia
- USS Octavia Sold in 1972 became fish factory ship
- USS Valentine Sold in 1967 became fish factory ship

=== R2-ST-AU1 ===
R2-ST-AU1 6,148 DWT, built by Newport News Shipbuilding in Newport News, Virginia in 1947. Twin screw with two 6,600 shp (4,900 kW) geared turbines, max. speed of 18 knots (33 km/h; 21 mph). Also called a banana boat. Length 138.82 meters (455 ft 5 in), beam: 18.67 meters (61 ft 3 in), depth: 10.83 meters (35 ft 6 in), draught: 8.28 meters (27 ft 2 in) and Refrigerated: 333,900 cubic feet (9,450 m^{3}). Owner and operator United Fruit Steamship Corporation Inc., New York, New York.

- SS Parismina Scrapped 1977
- SS Heredia renamed SS Tanamo, Scrapped 1977
- SS Metapan Scrapped 1977

=== R1-S-DH1 ===
R1-S-DH1 Yaque class. 5,008 DWT, built Bethlehem Steel Sparrows Point, Maryland in 1947–1948, Engine: De Laval Turbine Company Inc., Trenton, New Jersey, 6,050 hp (4,511 kW), 16 knots (30 km/h; 18 mph), Length: 117.66 meters (386 ft 0 in), derricks 9, winches 8. For United Fruit Company, Inc., New York, New York. Used to move tropical fruit and vegetables during war. Smallest of the R ships. Also had a few passenger cabins.

- SS Yaque Scrapped 1972
- SS Cibao Scrapped 1975
- SS Quisqueya Scrapped 1975
- SS Santo Cerro renamed SS Castilla 1969, Scrapped 1975
- SS Sixaola Scrapped 1978
- SS Tivives Scrapped 1968
- SS Hibueras Scrapped 1972
- SS Ulua Scrapped 1972
- SS Morazan Scrapped 1976

== Notable incidents ==
- SS Matchless, a R2-S-BV1, sold to the United States Navy in 1952 and renamed USS Aludra. She was sold and renamed Aleutian Monarch in 1979 as a fish factory ship. She caught fire, burning for five days and was scuttled on 12 November 1981 off Unalaska Island, Alaska.

== Other World War reefers ==
- Due to the lack of refrigerated cargo ships, World War One and other refrigerated cargo ships were used for World War Two. The Mizar-class stores ships were six United Fruit passenger and refrigerated cargo liners built in 1931–33 that the United States Maritime Commission requisitioned in 1941–42 for the war. The six ships requisitioned were: USS Antigua, USS Ariel, USS Merak, USS Mizar, USS Talamanca and USS Tarazed. Antigua, although requisitioned, was never commissioned into the Navy.
- Also requisitioned from the United Fruit Company was SS Ulua; which became USS Octans. It was the last of the United Fruit Company reefer ships to be taken over for the war; near the end of April 1943 in San Francisco.
- The Danish reefer ships of the J. Lauritzen A/S shipping company seized in U.S. ports after Germany occupied Denmark: Australian Reefer (USS Pontiac), African Reefer (USS Roamer) and Maria (USS Uranus).
- The company Concrete Ship Constructors Shipyard, in National City, California, built three concrete ships with reefer space. The three ships hulls, 45, 46 and 47 were completed with reefer capacity.

== See also ==
- Victory ships
- Liberty ship
- Type C1 ship
- Type C2 ship
- Type C3 ship
- United States Merchant Marine Academy
- List of auxiliaries of the United States Navy
