= Evening at Pops =

- Genre: Variety show
- Narrated by: Gene Galusha
- Country of origin: United States
- Original language: English

Production
- Production locations: Boston, Massachusetts, United States
- Production company: WGBH-TV

Original release
- Network: PBS
- Release: July 5, 1970 – August 7, 2004

Evening at Pops is an American concert television series produced by WGBH-TV. It is one of the longest-running programs on PBS, airing from 1970 to 2004. The program was a public television version of a variety show, featuring performances by the Boston Pops Orchestra. It was taped at Symphony Hall in Boston, Massachusetts.

== Format ==
Most shows featured a guest star, usually a well known singer or musician, most commonly within popular music or sometimes rock, folk, jazz or other musical genres. After one or two opening numbers by the Pops, the guest would be brought onstage. Usually the guest would sing several of their own hits or songs associated with them, with accompaniment by the Pops. After concluding their set, the guest artist would leave the stage, and the Pops would play one or two closing numbers. Three men served as conductor during the show's run – Arthur Fiedler (1970–79), John Williams (1979–95) and Keith Lockhart (1996–2004). Gene Galusha provided narration and announced most of the pieces played.

Evening at Symphony, a companion series produced by WGBH and featuring performances of the Boston Symphony Orchestra conducted by Seiji Ozawa, aired on PBS from 1974 to 1979.

== Evening at Pops Theme ==
John Williams composed a TV theme for the show in 1981.

During the funding credits in the 1990s, a version of Dmitri Shostakovich's Festive Overture, Op. 96 was heard, adapted by Williams and performed by the BPO.

== Demise ==
The long-running show ended after its 2004–2005 season because the Pops' parent organization, the Boston Symphony Orchestra, did not want to continue funding the nearly $1 million production cost of each episode.
