= USS Palisana =

Cargo ship of the United States Navy

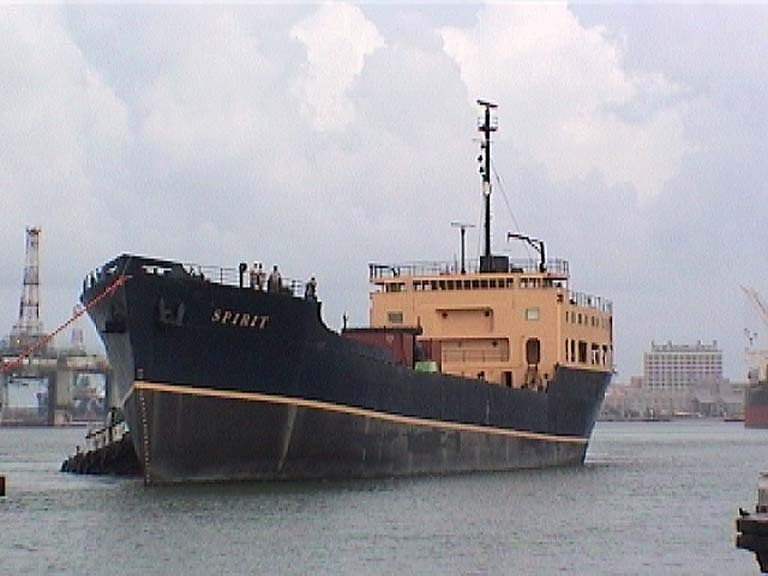
- Palisana, then renamed as Spirit in 1985

History

United States
- Ordered: as R1-M-AV3 hull,
- Laid down: 28 August 1944
- Launched: 21 October 1944
- Acquired: 22 March 1945
- Commissioned: 16 April 1945
- Decommissioned: c. April–May 1946
- Stricken: 19 June 1946
- Identification: IMO number: 5269003
- Fate: Sold, 1957

General characteristics
- Tonnage: 2,120 long tons deadweight (DWT)
- Displacement: 3,139 t.(lt) 6,240 t.(fl)
- Length: 338 ft (103 m)
- Beam: 50 ft (15 m)
- Draught: 18 ft (5.5 m)
- Propulsion: diesel engine, single screw, 1,8th centuryhp
- Speed: 12 kts. (max)
- Complement: 84
- Armament: one single 3 in (76 mm) dual purpose gun mount, six single 20 mm gun mounts

USS Palisana (AF-39) was an Adria stores ship stores ship acquired by the U.S. Navy for service in World War II. Her task was to carry stores, refrigerated items, and equipment to ships in the fleet, and to remote stations and staging areas.

Palisana was laid down by the Pennsylvania Shipyards, Inc., Beaumont, Texas, 28 August 1944 under contract with the U.S. Maritime Commission; launched 21 October 1944; sponsored by Mrs. Hugh R. Jones; delivered to the U.S. Navy on a bareboat charter basis on 22 March 1945; commissioned 16 April 1945.

== World War II service ==
Following shakedown, Palisana took on cargo in Mobile, Alabama, transited the Panama Canal 18 May and proceeded to Pearl Harbor where she joined ServRon 8, U.S. Pacific Fleet. She departed Pearl Harbor 14 June bound for Ulithi, Caroline Islands.

=== Okinawa operations ===
From there she sailed to Okinawa with cargo for various ships of the fleet and army units ashore there. Under continuing threat of air attack, she remained at Okinawa until 13 August when she returned to Ulithi. Thence she steamed to New Zealand and the Marianas. She transported returning servicemen to Seattle, Washington, in early November, returned to Okinawa 22 January 1946 and carried out service missions to occupation forces in Korea and China before returning to Puget Sound Navy Yard 26 March.

== Post-war decommissioning ==
Palisana was returned to the U.S. Maritime Commission 22 May. She was struck from the Naval Register 19 June 1946. She was then leased by the Maritime Commission for commercial service, to the Alaska Steamship Co., and renamed Spirit. In 1957, she was purchased by an unknown company in Tacoma, Washington. Friend Ships obtained Spirit, 2 October 1985 for humanitarian purposes. Though Spirit hasn't sailed since 2003, she continues to serve as a housing and dining base for Friend Ships crew based in Lake Charles, LA.

== Military awards and honors ==
Navy records do not indicate battle stars for Palisana. However, her crew was eligible for the following:

- American Campaign Medal
- Asiatic-Pacific Campaign Medal
- World War II Victory Medal
- Navy Occupation Service Medal (with Asia clasp)
