= USS Valentine =

Cargo ship of the United States Navy

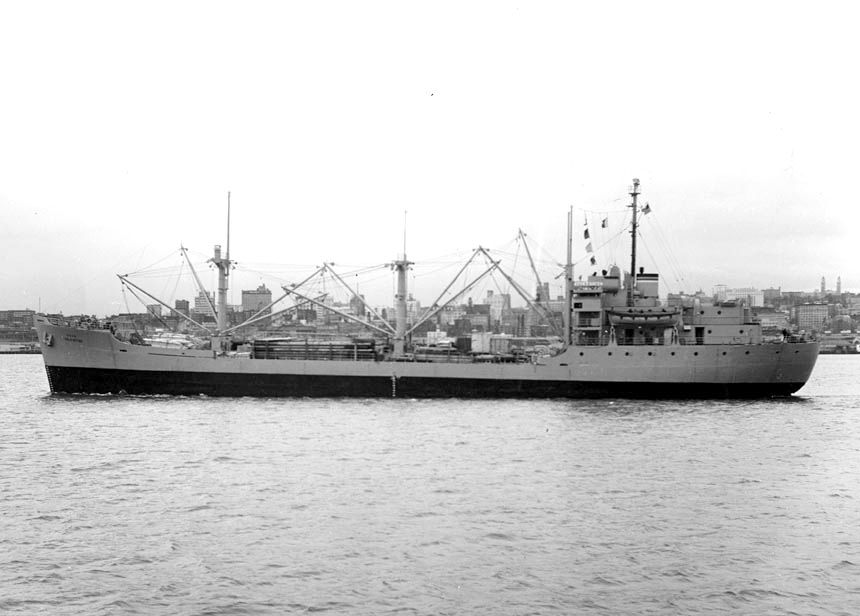

History

United States
- Ordered: as R1-M-AV3 hull, MC Hull 2339
- Laid down: date unknown
- Launched: 3 February 1945
- Acquired: 19 June 1945
- Commissioned: 19 July 1945
- Decommissioned: 6 August 1946
- Stricken: 8 October 1946
- Identification: IMO number: 6912293
- Fate: converted to fish factory ship

General characteristics
- Tonnage: 2,120 long tons deadweight (DWT)
- Displacement: 3,139 t.(lt) 6,240 t.(fl)
- Length: 338 ft (103 m)
- Beam: 50 ft (15 m)
- Draught: 18 ft (5.5 m)
- Propulsion: diesel engine, single screw, 1,700 shp (1,300 kW)
- Speed: 12 kts. (max)
- Complement: 84
- Armament: one single 3 in (76 mm) dual purpose gun mount, six single 20 mm gun mounts

USS Valentine (AF-47) was an Adria-class stores ship in service with the United States Navy from 1945 to 1946 and from 1951 to 1959. In 1967, She was sold into commercial service, and she was scrapped in 1987.

== History ==
Valentine was laid down under a Maritime Commission contract (MC hull 2339) at Beaumont, Texas, by the Pennsylvania Shipyards, Inc. Launched on 3 February 1945 and sponsored by Mrs. P. Blaschke, the ship was placed "in service" on 19 June 1945 for ferrying and departed Beaumont on 25 June, bound for Galveston, Texas. There, at the Todd-Galveston Shipyard, Inc., Valentine underwent conversion to a refrigeration ship. She was commissioned at Galveston, Texas, on 19 July 1945.

=== World War II ===
After shakedown and post-shakedown availability, Valentine departed Galveston on 2 August, bound for Mobile, Alabama. She loaded her first cargo of fleet supplies there and got underway on 10 August for the Pacific Ocean. While en route, the ship received word that Japan had surrendered on 14 August 1945. Valentine transited the Panama Canal on the 16th and departed Balboa shortly after noon on the 17th for the Hawaiian Islands.

=== Post-war operations ===
Valentine arrived at Pearl Harbor late in the morning of 5 September, discharged her first cargo, reloaded with fleet issue supplies over the ensuing days, and sailed for Okinawa on 21 September for onward routing.

Two days out of Buckner Bay, on 7 October, the barometer began to plummet; and, as Valentine's historian recorded, "all indications pointed to some pretty rough weather." Aerology reports indicated that a typhoon was passing ahead of the ship, and it was expected, initially, to go up the China coast. However, late on the 8th, the storm's course changed. In view of that development, Valentine reversed course to stay out of its center. The ship rode out the typhoon; 60-knot (110 km/h) winds drove waves and spray as high as the bridge. By the morning of the 9th, the wind and waves had calmed sufficiently to enable the ship to continue on to Okinawa. Although buffeted about in the heavy seas, Valentine had fared much better than other ships of the fleet that had been trapped at Okinawa as the center of the typhoon swirled destructively across Buckner Bay.

The refrigeration ship lingered at Buckner Bay from 1345 on the 11th to 1735 on the 12th before she got underway for the China coast. Arriving at Shanghai on the 16th, Valentine unloaded her cargo—part of which consisted of Thanksgiving dinners for American servicemen stationed at that port—before she eventually weighed anchor for Hong Kong shortly after noon on the 25th. While leaving Shanghai via a swept channel, Valentine encountered a mine that she sank with gunfire in the middle of that waterway. Later on in her voyage to the British Crown Colony, as the ship passed the southern tip of Formosa, her lookouts sighted another stray mine 50 yards (46 m) ahead; a quick course change enabled the vessel to slip by within a narrow margin before she destroyed that mine, too, with gunfire to end its threat to shipping.

Valentine arrived at Hong Kong at 0916 on 31 October, unloaded her cargo over the ensuing days, and sailed for home on 10 November. She arrived at San Francisco, California, on 8 December to take on another load of fleet issue supplies. All hands had hoped for a "stateside" Christmas, but this was not to be, as Valentine weighed anchor for the Far East on 22 December—three days before Christmas.

After the ship tarried at Okinawa, she was routed on to Japan, her holds laden with supplies for the American occupation forces. She touched at the Japanese ports of Sasebo, Kure, and Kobe, in succession, into late February 1946. She departed Kobe shortly before noon on 26 February and arrived back at San Francisco on 21 March. Loading cargo on a fleet issue basis, Valentine departed the west coast, one month later, on 21 April, bound again for the western Pacific.

She remained at Pearl Harbor from 30 April to 5 May before she proceeded on toward the Marshalls and arrived at Majuro on the 13th. She provided fresh and frozen provisions to ships of the fleet at Kwajalein, Roi, Bikini Atoll, Eniwetok, and Wake Island before she returned via Pearl Harbor to the west coast, arriving at San Francisco on 16 July. During her brief service career, Valentine sailed 47,770 miles (76,880 km) and delivered 6,400 tons of cargo.

=== Decommissioning and fate ===
Decommissioned at San Francisco on 6 August 1946, Valentine was transferred to the War Shipping Administration soon thereafter. She was struck from the Navy List on 8 October 1946. From 1951 to 1959, she was operated by the Military Sea Transportation Service as USNS Valentine (T-AF-47). Final Disposition: she was sold by the Maritime Administration in 1967 and converted to fish factory ship. She was used as a processing vessel by All Alaskan Seafoods located in Seattle, WA. and was renamed All Alaskan by that company. In 1987 she grounded off the coast of St. Paul Island, Alaska and became a total loss. Unable to be economically refloated, she was broken up and scrapped where she grounded on the northeast side of the island.

== Military awards and honors ==
Valentine's crew was eligible for the following medals:

- China Service Medal (extended)
- American Campaign Medal
- Asiatic-Pacific Campaign Medal
- World War II Victory Medal
- Navy Occupation Service Medal (with Asia clasp)
