= USS Aludra (AF-55) =

Cargo ship of the United States Navy

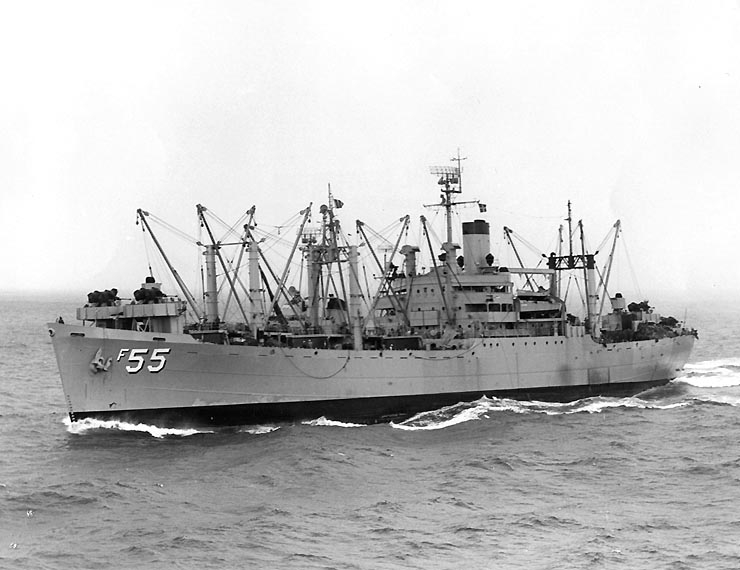
- Aludra (AF-55) on 17 September 1954

History

United States
- Ordered: as SS Matchless; R2-S-BV1 hull, MC 1202
- Laid down: 23 August 1944
- Launched: 14 October 1944
- Acquired: 30 November 1950
- Commissioned: 19 June 1952
- Decommissioned: 2 September 1969
- Fate: Burned and scuttled in 1981

General characteristics
- Displacement: 7,050 t.(lt), 15,500 tons(fl)
- Length: 459 ft 2 in (139.95 m)
- Beam: 63 ft (19 m)
- Draught: 28 ft (8.5 m)
- Propulsion: cross-compound turbines, single propeller
- Speed: 16 kts.
- Complement: 292
- Armament: twelve 3-inch (76 mm) guns

USS Aludra (AF-55) was an Alstede-class stores ship acquired by the U.S. Navy. Her task was to carry stores, refrigerated items, and equipment to ships in the fleet, and to remote stations and staging areas.

== History ==
=== Civilian freighter ===
The refrigerated cargo ship Matchless was laid down for the War Shipping Administration under a Maritime Commission contract (MC hull 1202) on 23 August 1944 at Oakland, California, by the Moore Dry Dock Company; launched on 14 October 1944; sponsored by Mrs. Harry E. Kennedy; and was delivered to the United States Lines under a bare boat charter on 23 March 1945. That firm operated the ship in the Pacific Ocean during the final months of the war and during the first four years following Japan's capitulation. On 11 August 1949, the ship was returned to the Maritime Commission at Mobile, Alabama, and she was laid up in the National Defense Reserve Fleet berthing area at Bay Minette, Alabama.

=== U.S. Navy service ===
In November 1950, the Navy selected Matchless for reactivation as it was expanding the Fleet to meet its greatly increased responsibilities resulting from the United Nations decision to oppose communist aggression in Korea. The vessel was towed to Camden, New Jersey, where she was overhauled and converted to a store ship by the New York Shipbuilding Corporation. During this work, she received the best and most modern equipment to enable her to carry out her primary mission, underway replenishment. Renamed Aludra on 16 January 1951, the ship was placed in commission by the Navy on 19 June 1952.

Assigned to Service Squadron 3, Service Force, Pacific Fleet Aludra arrived at Sasebo, Japan, on 28 October 1952 and took up the tasks of supporting Task Force (TF) 77 in strikes along the east coast of Korea and TF 72 in patrols in the East China Sea and off Formosa. Ending her first deployment to the western Pacific, she returned to San Francisco, California, on 4 May 1953.

Thereafter, for more than 16 years, she alternated operations on the west coast of the United States with tours in the Far East resupplying ships serving in the Orient. Among the highlights of her service was her participation in Operation Passage to Freedom, the evacuation of thousands of Vietnamese refugees from communist-controlled areas of Vietnam after that country had been partitioned in 1954. During the early years of her career, she was considered to be a pioneer in the development of improved and faster methods of fleet replenishment. To help her achieve this end, she received many alterations and tried out a great deal of experimental logistical equipment. The ship again visited Vietnamese waters in March 1965 and, for a bit over three and one-half years thereafter, devoted most of her efforts to supporting American warships fighting aggression there. She left that war-torn country for the last time on 19 April 1969 and headed—via Sasebo, Japan—for home.

=== Decommissioning and fate ===
Aludra arrived at Oakland, California, on 11 May and, a month later, began preparations for inactivation. Decommissioned on 12 September 1969, she was returned to the Maritime Administration and berthed with the National Defense Reserve Fleet at Suisun Bay, California. She was withdrawn from the reserve fleet on 19 January 1977 for stripping by the Navy prior to sale. She was purchased from MARAD by Sea World Processors Inc., for non-transportation use, 16 November 1977 and delivered, 16 February 1978. Final Disposition: burned and scuttled in 1981.

== Military awards and honors ==
Aludra received one battle star for Korean War service:

- Third Korean Winter Campaign

She received eight engagement stars for her operations in Vietnam. Five are noted below:

- Vietnam Defense
- Vietnamese Counteroffensive
- Vietnamese Counteroffensive-Phase III
- Tet Counteroffensive
- Vietnamese Counteroffensive-Phase V

Her crew was eligible for the following medals:

- National Defense Service Medal
- Korean Service Medal (1)
- Armed Forces Expeditionary Medal (1-Taiwan Straits, 1-Quemoy-Matsu, 1-Vietnam, 1-Korea)
- Vietnam Service Medal (5)
- United Nations Service Medal
- Republic of Vietnam Campaign Medal
- Republic of Korea War Service Medal (retroactive)
