= USS Gordonia =

Cargo ship of the United States Navy

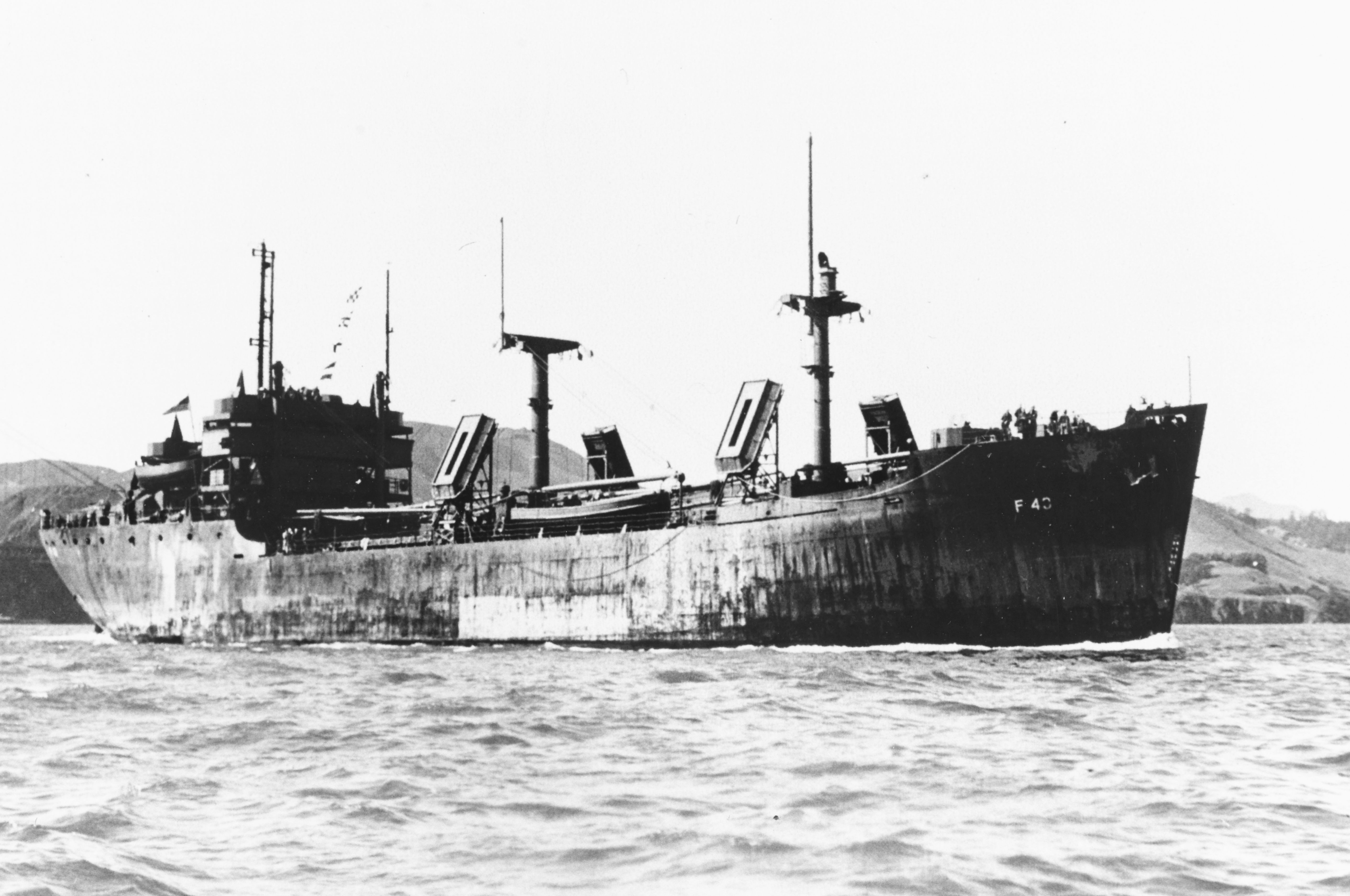

History

United States
- Ordered: as Whale Knot, R1-M-AV3 hull, MC 2205
- Laid down: date unknown
- Launched: 30 November 1944
- Commissioned: 14 May 1945
- Decommissioned: 8 July 1946
- Fate: Scrapped in 1974

General characteristics
- Tonnage: 2,120 long tons deadweight (DWT)
- Displacement: 3,139 t.(lt) 6,240 t.(fl)
- Length: 338 ft (103 m)
- Beam: 50 ft (15 m)
- Draught: 18 ft (5.5 m)
- Propulsion: diesel engine, single screw, 1,700 shp
- Speed: 12 knots (22 km/h) maximum
- Complement: 84
- Armament: one single 3 in (76 mm) dual purpose gun mount, six single 20 mm guns gun mounts

USS Gordonia (AF-43) was an Adria-class stores ship in service with the United States Navy from 1945 to 1946. She was scrapped in 1974.

== History ==
Gordonia, a provision stores ship, was launched 30 November 1944 by Pennsylvania Shipyards of Beaumont, Texas, under Maritime Commission contract; sponsored by Mrs. B. S. Matthews; and commissioned 14 May 1945 at Galveston, Texas.

=== World War II ===
Gordonia conducted a brief shakedown cruise in the Gulf of Mexico before departing for the Pacific Ocean. She loaded refrigerated cargo at Mobile, Alabama, transited the Panama Canal, and arrived Pearl Harbor 1 July 1945. There the ship reloaded stores for fleet issue and steamed westward 10 July to bring supplies to the fleet off Okinawa. After stopping at Ulithi she spent 6 August – 23 August in the Okinawa area dispensing much-needed stores then returned to Pearl Harbor, arriving 13 September.

In the months that followed, Gordonia made three more voyages to the Far East, carrying precious refrigerated cargo. Her first passage was 23 October to 27 November, and on the second, beginning January 1946, the ship visited Okinawa, Jinsen, and Taku in support of American Marines in China. She arrived San Francisco, 4 March. After one more voyage, this time to the Philippines, Gordonia arrived San Francisco 13 June.

=== Decommissioning and fate ===
There she decommissioned 8 July 1946 and was returned to the Maritime Commission the same day. Gordonia was subsequently renamed Whale Knot and was berthed with the National Defense Reserve Fleet in Suisun Bay, California. During 1946–1948, she was operated commercially by the Matson Navigation Company, after which she was returned to the Maritime Administration, only to be transferred to the U.S. Army Transportation Command. She was returned to the Maritime Administration for lay up in the National Defense Reserve Fleet, Suisun Bay, Benicia, California, in early 1949. Final Disposition, scrapped in 1974.

== Military awards and honors ==
Gordonia’s crew was eligible for the following medals:

- American Campaign Medal
- Asiatic-Pacific Campaign Medal
- World War II Victory Medal
- Navy Occupation Service Medal (with Asia clasp)
