= USS Bondia =

Cargo ship of the United States Navy

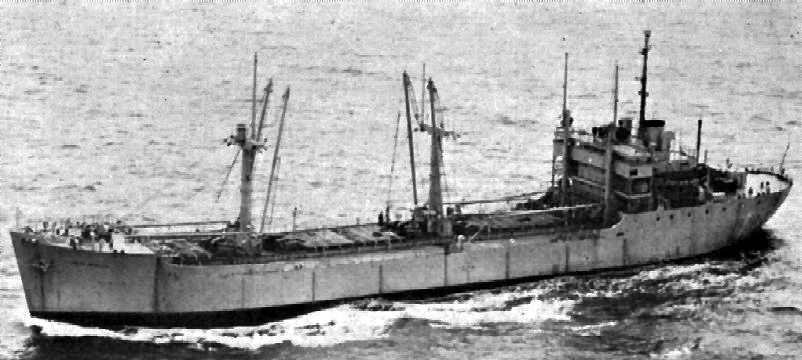

History

United States
- Ordered: as M/V Flemish Bend, R1-M-AV3 hull, MC hull 2204
- Laid down: 18 September 1944
- Launched: 9 November 1944
- Acquired: 31 March 1945
- Commissioned: 17 April 1945
- Decommissioned: 29 July 1946
- In service: as USNS Bondia (T-AF-42); 27 July 1951
- Out of service: April 1973
- Stricken: 1 May 1973
- Fate: Scrapped in 1974

General characteristics
- Tonnage: 2,120 long tons deadweight (DWT)
- Displacement: 3,139 t.(lt) 6,240 t.(fl)
- Length: 338 ft (103 m)
- Beam: 50 ft (15 m)
- Draught: 18 ft (5.5 m)
- Propulsion: diesel engine, single screw, 1,700shp
- Speed: 12 kts. (max)
- Complement: 84
- Armament: one single 3 in (76 mm) dual purpose gun mount, six single 20 mm gun mounts

USS Bondia (AF-42) was an Adria-class stores ship in service with the United States Navy from 1945 to 1946 and from 1951 to 1973. She was scrapped in 1974.

== History ==
Bondia was laid down on 18 September 1944 at Beaumont, Texas, by the Pennsylvania Shipyard under a Maritime Commission contract (MC hull 2204); launched on 9 November 1944; sponsored by Mrs. Les Reil; delivered to the Navy on 31 March 1945; and commissioned on 17 April 1945.

=== World War II ===
Following a period in drydock at Galveston, Texas, the store ship got underway on 29 April for her shakedown cruise in the Gulf of Mexico. She returned to Galveston on 4 May and, after a six-day post-shakedown availability, headed for Mobile, Alabama, on the 10th. From 12 to 17 May, the ship loaded fresh provisions at Mobile. On the 17th, she stood out to sea on her way to the Pacific Ocean. Bondia arrived at Cristobal—the northern and Atlantic terminus of the Panama Canal—on 22 May. There, she spent three days dismantling faulty refrigeration equipment. On the night of the 25th and 26th, she transited the Panama Canal and then moored at Balboa to await delivery of additional spare parts for her refrigeration machinery.

Bondia finally received her parts on 1 July, and she got underway for the Philippines that same day. Although difficulties with her main engine plagued her during the voyage, she arrived at Guiuan, Samar, on 11 August and spent the rest of the month issuing small amounts of supplies and provisions at various locations in the archipelago. On the last day of August, the store ship departed Calicoan Island and shaped a course for the Admiralty Islands. She arrived at Manus on 6 September, loaded fresh provisions and dry cargo, and headed back to the Philippines on the 14th. Bondia entered Subic Bay on 21 September and began discharging cargo.

=== Post-war activity ===
Between the return of the USS Bon to the Philippines in late September 1945 and the first week in January 1946, the store ship made two more round-trip voyages to Manus and back. On 1 February 1946, Bondia set sail for the United States. She made a brief stop at Pearl Harbor between 24 and 26 February before arriving in San Francisco, California, on 6 March. She remained on the U.S. West Coast for almost a month and then headed back to the Far East on 3 April. The ship arrived in Qingdao, China, on the 27th. During the following five weeks, Bondia made calls at ports in China, Korea, and Japan. She headed home from Japan on 12 June and arrived in San Francisco on the 28th. Just over a month later, on 29 July 1946, she was placed out of commission and was transferred to the Maritime Commission.

=== Military Sea Transportation Service ===
Between 1946 and 1951, the Maritime Commission operated her as a merchant ship under the name SS Flemish Bend. On 27 July 1951, the Navy reacquired her for service in the Military Sea Transportation Service (MSTS). Though not in a commissioned status, the stores ship reassumed the name Bondia and plied the waters of the Atlantic Ocean and the Mediterranean Sea for over 20 years in support to American warships.

=== Decommissioning and fate ===
She was finally placed out of service in April 1973, and her name was struck from the Navy list on 1 May 1973. On 19 November 1973, the ship was sold to the Chi Shun Hua Steel Co., Ltd., of Kaohsiung, Taiwan, for scrapping.

== Military awards and honors ==
The USS Bondia’s crew was eligible for the following medals:

- China Service Medal (extended)
- American Campaign Medal
- Asiatic-Pacific Campaign Medal
- World War II Victory Medal
- Navy Occupation Service Medal (with Asia clasp)
- Philippines Liberation Medal
