= USS Lioba =

Cargo ship of the United States Navy

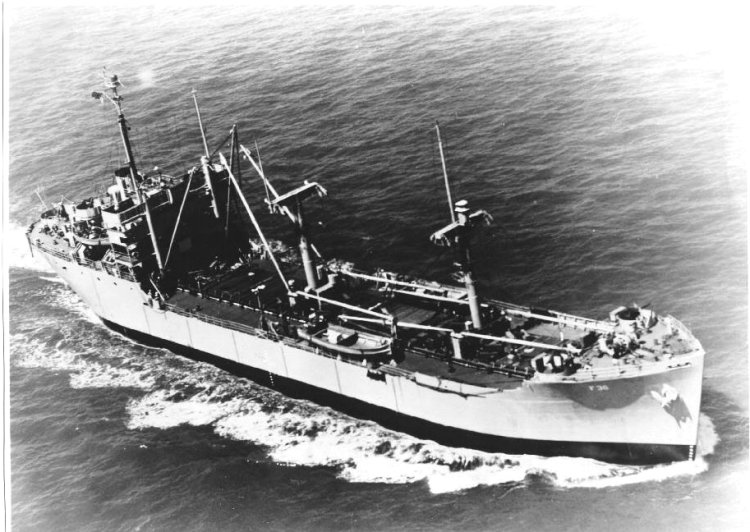

History

United States
- Ordered: as R1-M-AV3 hull, MC hull 2200
- Laid down: 23 June 1944
- Launched: 27 August 1944
- Acquired: 17 February 1945
- Commissioned: 6 March 1945
- Decommissioned: 14 October 1955
- Stricken: 1 July 1960
- Fate: Scrapped in 1973

General characteristics
- Tonnage: 2,120 long tons deadweight (DWT)
- Displacement: 3,139 t.(lt) 6,240 t.(fl)
- Length: 338 ft (103 m)
- Beam: 50 ft (15 m)
- Draught: 18 ft (5.5 m)
- Propulsion: diesel engine, single screw, 1,700shp
- Speed: 12 kts. (max)
- Complement: 84
- Armament: one single 3 in (76 mm) dual purpose gun mount, six single 20 mm gun mounts

USS Lioba (AF-36) was an Adria-class stores ship in service with the United States Navy from 1945 to 1955. She was scrapped in 1973.

== History ==
Lioba was laid down under United States Maritime Commission contract 23 June 1944 by Pennsylvania Shipyard, Beaumont, Texas; launched 27 August 1944; sponsored by Mrs. W. B. Porter; acquired by the Navy 17 February 1945; and commissioned 6 March 1945.

=== World War II service ===
After shakedown in the Gulf of Mexico, the refrigerated cargo ship departed Mobile, Alabama, 30 March 1945, for Pearl Harbor en route to Ulithi and Okinawa with mail and cargo for the fighting men pushing towards Japan and victory. Arriving Okinawa 4 June, Lioba supplied fresh meat and provisions to navy ships anchored off Hagushi Beach. Departing a week later, she steamed for New Zealand, arrived 19 June, loaded cargo at Auckland and Napier, New Zealand, and sailed 1 August for Pearl Harbor.

=== Post-war activity ===
Arriving 8 August, she celebrated V-J Day unloading cargo, and departed 24 August for San Francisco, California. A week later the hard working reefer, loaded with 1,600 tons of fleet issue cargo, again steamed for the western Pacific. After discharging chilled and dry provisions for occupation forces at Guam, Saipan, Tinian and Tokyo, she returned to San Francisco 20 January 1946.

Departing 10 February, Lioba made one more cargo run to Yokosuka and the Pacific Islands, returned to San Francisco 10 May, and sailed 2 days later for the U.S. East Coast. Arriving Hampton Roads 30 May, for the remainder of 1946 she steamed along the Atlantic coast and in the Caribbean, visiting Boston, Massachusetts, Bayonne, New Jersey, Charleston, South Carolina, Puerto Rico, and Trinidad.

=== North Atlantic operations ===
For the next 9 years, as the U.S. Navy provided the key bulwark for a Europe threatened by communism, Lioba operated with the Service Force, Atlantic Fleet, supporting the Navy's effort to keep the peace in the North Atlantic Ocean and Mediterranean. The ship departed Boston, Massachusetts, 10 January 1947 for the first of 11 Mediterranean cruises, transporting provisions to the U.S. 6th Fleet at Golfe Juan, France, and Naples, Italy.

Sandwiched between Mediterranean duty, Lioba completed three training cruises to Guantanamo Bay, Cuba, and carried fresh meat and supplies to other Navy outposts in the Caribbean.

=== Decommissioning and fate ===
Lioba departed Naples, Italy, 10 April 1955 for her final passage to the United States, arriving Norfolk, Virginia, the 24th. On 30 July she steamed to Charleston, South Carolina, where she decommissioned 14 October 1955, and entered the Atlantic Reserve Fleet. She remained there until transferred to the United States Maritime Commission and struck from the Navy list 1 July 1960. She entered the National Defense Reserve Fleet and was berthed in the James River, Virginia, into 1969. Final Disposition, scrapped in 1973.

== Military awards and honors ==
The Navy record does not reflect any battle stars awarded to Lioba. However, her crew was eligible for the following medals:

- American Campaign Medal
- Asiatic–Pacific Campaign Medal
- World War II Victory Medal
- Navy Occupation Service Medal (with Asia clasp)
- National Defense Service Medal
