= USS Merapi =

Cargo ship of the United States Navy

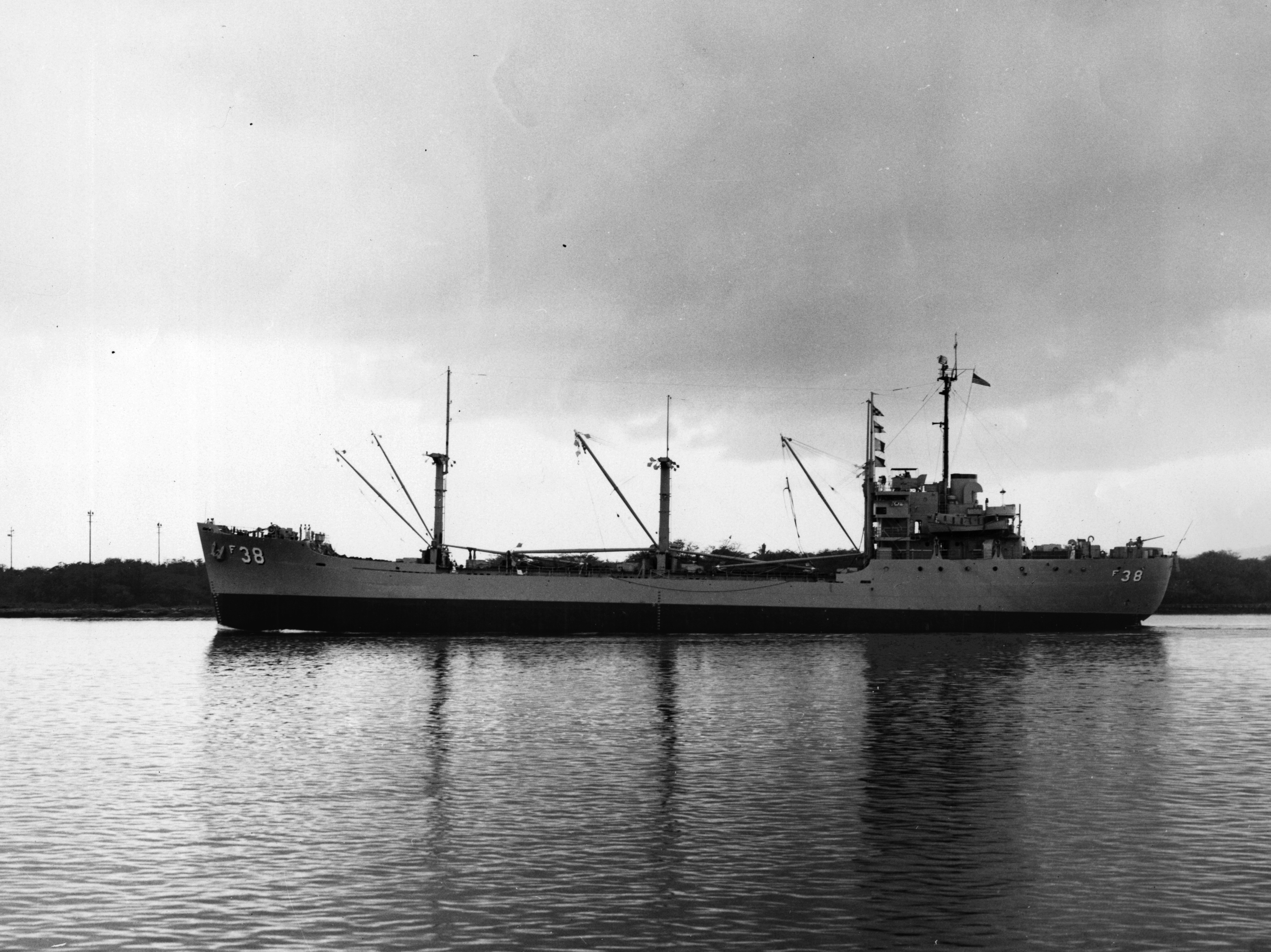

History

United States
- Ordered: as R1-M-AV3 hull, MC hull 2202
- Laid down: 14 August 1944
- Launched: 4 October 1944
- Acquired: 5 March 1945
- Commissioned: 21 March 1945
- Decommissioned: 18 January 1959
- Stricken: 1 July 1960
- Fate: Sold by the Maritime Administration in 1966, converted to fish factory ship

General characteristics
- Tonnage: 2,120 long tons deadweight (DWT)
- Displacement: 3,139 t.(lt) 6,240 t.(fl)
- Length: 338 ft (103 m)
- Beam: 50 ft (15 m)
- Draught: 18 ft (5.5 m)
- Propulsion: diesel engine, single screw, 1,700shp
- Speed: 12 kts. (max)
- Complement: 84
- Armament: one single 3 in (76 mm) dual purpose gun mount, six single 20 mm gun mounts

USS Merapi (AF-38) was an Adria stores ship acquired by the U.S. Navy for service in World War II, named after Mount Merapi, the mountain in Java, Indonesia. Her task was to carry stores, refrigerated items, and equipment to ships in the fleet, and to remote stations and staging areas.

Merapi was laid down 11 August 1944 by Pennsylvania Shipyards Inc., Beaumont, Texas, under a Maritime contract; launched 4 October 1944; sponsored by Mrs. A. B. Matthews; transferred to the Navy 5 March and commissioned 21 March 1945.

== World War II service ==
Converted at Todd Galveston Dry Dock Co., Merapi hastened through shakedown and departed Mobile, Alabama, 11 April, for the Pacific Ocean war zone. Specializing in refrigerated stores, she sailed via Pearl Harbor to Kerama Retto, Okinawa where in the midst of numerous air alerts she unloaded 14 to 19 June. Having retired to Pearl Harbor for more supplies she got underway again on 20 July and spent the final month of the war at Eniwetok Atoll disbursing cargo.

== Post-war activity ==
In the postwar period Merapi provided logistic support for U.S. occupation forces, initially using Auckland, New Zealand, as her supply base. Spending much of 1946 and part of 1948 on the China coast she remained active through the central and western Pacific until 1950.

== Korean War operations ==
During the Korean War she operated with units of the U.S. 7th Fleet in Korean and Japanese waters. While employed as a support vessel, she saw action off the Pusan Perimeter, participated in the Wonsan and Inchon invasions, and assisted in the evacuation of troops from Hungnam.

== Vietnam operations ==
A return to the United States in the latter half of 1953 preceded assignment to the mid Pacific logistic support group home ported at Pearl Harbor. Support of facilities at Kwajalein, Marshalls, Eniwetok, Carolines, and Midway Island was temporarily interrupted in September 1954. For 3 months Merapi provided food stocks to the ships engaged in the evacuation of civilians and troops from North Vietnam to Saigon in Operation Passage to Freedom.

== Supporting nuclear testing activity ==
Interruptions also occurred March to July 1956 as AF-38 appeared in support of the nuclear testing exercise Operation Redwing, and the following April as she sailed on a good will visit to Australia. She then participated in Operation Hardtack I in the Marshall Islands.

The ship departed 5 August 1958 for a brief two-month WestPac tour before steaming back to the United States for her first appearance in over four years.

== Inactivation and decommissioning ==
Arriving in Astoria, Oregon on 6 November, inactivation began almost immediately. She was decommissioned 16 January 1959, joining the Pacific Reserve Fleet, until struck from the Navy List 1 July 1960. She was then sold by the Maritime Administration in 1966, and converted to a fish factory ship and renamed Northern Venture.

== Military awards and honors ==
Merapi received one battle star for World War II service, five for the Korean War, and was twice awarded the Korean Presidential Unit Citation. Her crew was eligible for the following medals shown in order of precedence:

- China Service Medal (extended)
- American Campaign Medal
- Asiatic-Pacific Campaign Medal (1)
- World War II Victory Medal
- Navy Occupation Service Medal (with Asia clasp)
- National Defense Service Medal
- Korean Service Medal (5)
- Republic of Korea Presidential Unit Citation (2)
- United Nations Service Medal
- Republic of Korea War Service Medal (retroactive)
