= The New Detectives =

Documentary true crime television series

- Also known as: Murder Detectives: Case Files (The UK's Channel 5); Forensic Detectives (Sky TV and Quest Red in the UK and Ireland)
- Created by: New Dominion Pictures
- Starring: FBI/United States Police districts
- Narrated by: Gene Galusha
- Country of origin: United States
- Original language: English
- No. of seasons: 9
- No. of episodes: 121 (List of episodes)

Production
- Producer: Michael Sinclair/Peter Koeppen/Tom Naughton
- Running time: 49–50 minutes
- Production company: New Dominion Pictures

Original release
- Network: Discovery Channel
- Release: June 10, 1996 – October 31, 2004

The New Detectives: Case Studies in Forensic Science (or simply The New Detectives, formally "Forensic Detectives") is a documentary true crime television show that aired two to three different cases in forensic science per episode from 1996 to 2004. Episode reruns currently air on the Discovery Channel, TLC, Investigation Discovery, Pluto TV, and True Crime Network. Before the series was canceled, the show also aired on The History Channel and Court TV in the United States and Canal D in Canada, as well as Botswana TV. The show was also carried by international markets where the series was shown on the Discovery Channel UK, Discovery Europe, the Crime & Investigation Network in Australia, Prime TV in New Zealand, TV Norge, TV Danmark, Kanal 5 in Sweden, and RTL in the Netherlands.

In Brazil, the TV series was narrated by the Italian-Brazilian announcer and journalist Wilson Versolato.

== Synopsis ==
The New Detectives centers on murders that are committed in North America and the forensics used to convict the murderers of their crimes. The New Detectives shows reenactments and dramatizations of events surrounding a murder. Real-file footage is shown on occasion. Unlike The FBI Files, a sister show, also produced by Tom Naughton and New Dominion Pictures, The New Detectives mostly centers on murders that police departments solve without assistance from the FBI, but there have been episodes where the FBI was called in to assist with particularly serious crimes. The series was narrated by Gene Galusha from 1996 to 2004.

Anthony E. Zuiker, the creator of CSI: Crime Scene Investigation got the idea for the show from The New Detectives. In a talk at the International Mystery Writers Festival in June 2008, Zuiker said that he was working as a tram driver in Las Vegas when he came up with the idea for the series. He said he was about to go out to play basketball with some friends when his first wife asked him to stay in and watch The New Detectives on the Discovery Channel. "I decided to stay, and that changed everything".

Several international episodes were dubbed by Susan Rae. One of these was Burning Evidence about forensics done on broken and charred bone and tooth remnants and another was Short Fuse about forensics done on bomb sites and pipe bomb fragments.

== Home media ==
Timeless Media Group has released the first four seasons of The New Detectives on DVD in Region 1.

DVD name	Ep #	Release date
Season 1 & 2	16	February 10, 2009
Season 3	10	May 19, 2009
Season 4	18	August 11, 2009

== See also ==
- Forensic Files
- The FBI Files
