= USS Bellatrix (AKA-3) =

Cargo ship of the United States Navy

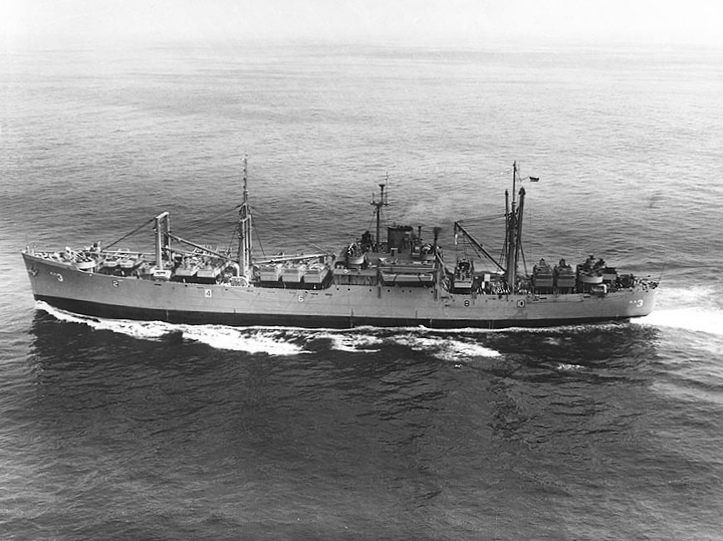
- USS Bellatrix (AKA-3)

History

United States
- Name: USS Bellatrix
- Namesake: Bellatrix, a star in the constellation Orion
- Builder: Tampa Shipbuilding and Drydock Co.
- Laid down: 20 November 1940
- Launched: 15 August 1941
- Commissioned: 17 February 1942
- Decommissioned: 1 April 1946
- Recommissioned: 16 May 1952
- Decommissioned: 3 June 1955
- Identification: Hull number: AK-20/AKA-3
- Honors and awards: Six battle stars
- Fate: Transferred to Peruvian Navy on 20 July 1963

Peru
- Name: BAP Independencia
- Commissioned: 1963
- Decommissioned: 1991
- Fate: Sold for scrapping in October 1991, but sank on the way to breakers.

General characteristics
- Class & type: Arcturus-class attack cargo ship
- Displacement: 8,045 long tons (8,174 t)
- Length: 459 ft 1 in (139.93 m)
- Beam: 63 ft (19 m)
- Draft: 26 ft 5 in (8.05 m)
- Propulsion: Diesel engine, 6,900 hp (5,100 kW), single propeller
- Speed: 16 knots (30 km/h; 18 mph)
- Complement: 369
- Armament: 1 × 5 in (130 mm) DP gun; 4 × 3 in (76 mm) DP gun; 14 × twin 20 mm guns

USS Bellatrix (AK-20/AKA-3) was an Arcturus-class attack cargo ship in the United States Navy during World War II and the Korean War. Originally ordered as a C2-T cargo ship named Raven for the Maritime Commission, the vessel was transferred to United States Navy control while under construction and launched in August 1941.

Bellatrix was assigned to the US Pacific theater of operations and took part in the Battle of Guadalcanal. This was followed by a transfer to the Mediterranean Theater of Operations and participation in the Allied invasion of Sicily. Returning to the Pacific, Bellatrix took part in the Battle of Saipan, the attack cargo ship's last combat operation in World War II. The vessel was decommissioned in April 1946 and returned to the Maritime Commission. The ship was reactivated for the Korean War, transporting supplies from Japan to the Korean peninsula before being decommissioned again. Placed in reserve, the ship was sold to Peru in 1953 and renamed BAP Independencia. The vessel remained in service until 1991 when Independencia was sold for scrap. However, while being towed to the ship breakers, the vessel sank.

== Construction and career ==
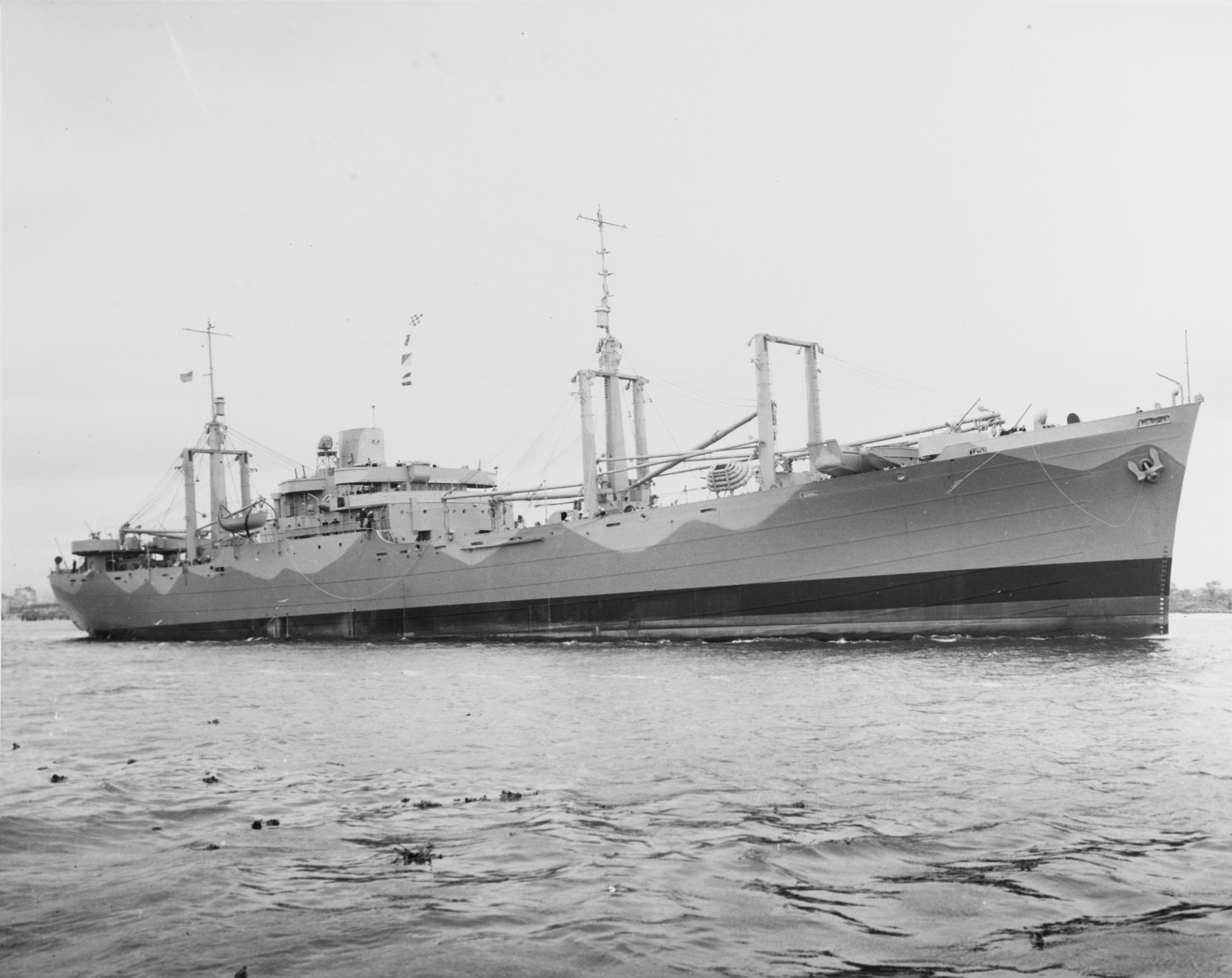
Bellatrix off Tampa, Florida, in 1942

The ship was constructed in Tampa, Florida by Tampa Shipbuilding Co., Inc as a C2-T class merchant marine cargo ship for the Maritime Commission (MC hull 126) under the name Raven. The vessel was laid down on 16 April 1941. On 25 April, the War Shipping Administration transferred control of the unfinished Raven to the United States Navy (USN). She was reclassified as an AKA-3 attack cargo ship, renamed Bellatrix and launched on 15 August, sponsored by Miss Sally Taliafero. The ship was named after the star Bellatrix in the constellation Orion. The name means "female warrior," in Latin and the star is usually named as the 22nd brightest star in the northern hemisphere. Bellatrix was commissioned on 17 February 1942 under the command of Commander W.F. Dietrich.

Bellatrix served in the Pacific during 1942, and participated in the Battle of Guadalcanal by delivering troops and supplies to the initial attack on 7 August. She made two subsequent shipments to the island, bringing both cargo and reinforcements. In 1943 she became part of the Mediterranean Theater of Operations, participating in the Allied invasion of Sicily. A subsequent shipment to the Gilbert Islands was terminated due to engine failure; Bellatrix returned to San Francisco, California, for repairs.

In 1944, the repaired Bellatrix joined General Holland "Howling Mad" Smith's amphibious fleet moving to take the island of Saipan. On 16 July, she delivered her cargo, soldiers from the U.S. Army's 27th Infantry Division, just two days before the defeat of the Japanese General, Yoshitsugu Saito.

The Battle of Saipan was Bellatrix's last World War II deployment. She was decommissioned in April 1946, and returned to the Maritime Commission three months later.

Bellatrix was reacquired by the navy for the Korean War. She was recommissioned 16 May 1952, and performed cargo deliveries and training missions until 1955. Decommissioned a second time, Bellatrix subsequently spent eight years in the Pacific Reserve Fleet before being transferred to Peru in 1963. In 1991 she was sold for scrap, but sank in transit to the port of scrapping.

== Bibliography ==
- Wright, Christopher C. (1998). "Question 17/97: Screen of Convoys that Includes USS McCawley, April–May 1942". Warship International. XXXV (3). International Naval Research Organization: 307–313. ISSN 0043-0374.
