= Gene Galusha =

American actor

- Born: Eugene Belden Galusha; August 20, 1941; Schenectady, New York
- Died: August 6, 2008 (aged 66); Albany, New York
- Occupations: Television actor, narrator
- Years active: 1972–2008
- Spouse: Karen Galusha (until his death)
- Website: http://www.voicegene.com

Eugene Belden “Gene” Galusha (August 20, 1941 – August 6, 2008) was a Jewish-American part-time actor and full-time narrator who worked for PBS, ESPN, Court TV, Discovery Channel, A&E, ABC, The Learning Channel and NFL Films.

== Filmography ==
=== As actor ===
- Stephanie Daley (as Mr. Gilchrist) (2006)
- The West Wing
- Particular Men (1972).

=== As narrator ===
- Hunters: The World of Predators and Prey
- Evening at Pops
- Frontline
- The Investigators
- The New Detectives: Case Studies in Forensic Science
- National Geographic Explorer
- Nova
- Masterpiece Theatre
- Mystery!
- The Rockefeller Family and Colonial Williamsburg
- War and Peace in the Nuclear Age (1989)
- Iceland River Challenge
- The Longest Hatred: A Revealing History of Anti-Semitism (1991)

== Death ==
According to IMDb, Galusha died from an unspecified form of cancer on August 6, 2008.
