= USS Bellatrix (AF-62) =

Cargo ship of the United States Navy

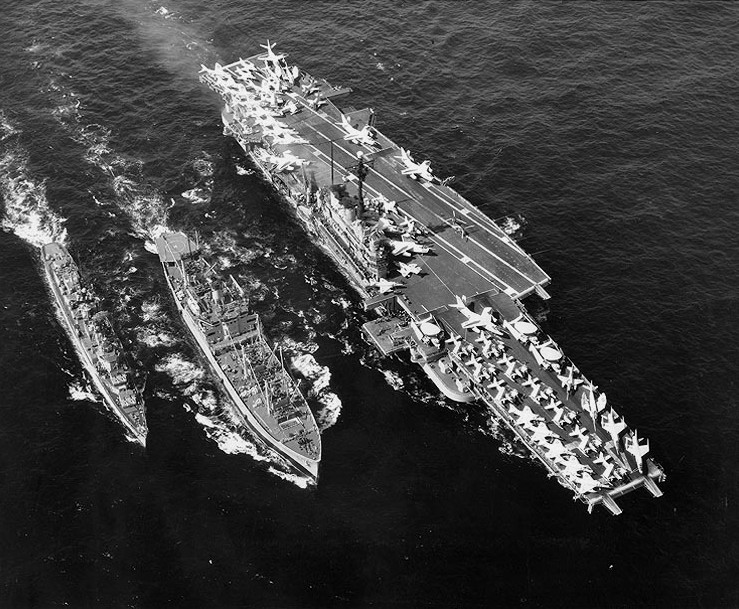
- Bellatrix replenishing Coral Sea and Duncan in 1962.

History

United States
- Name: USS Bellatrix
- Operator: United States Navy
- Ordered: as SS Fleetwood, R2-S-BV1 hull, MC hull 1207
- Builder: Moore Drydock Co. Oakland, CA.
- Laid down: 16 October 1944
- Launched: 4 December 1944
- Commissioned: 18 November 1961
- Decommissioned: 30 September 1968
- Stricken: 30 September 1968
- Fate: Scrapped in 1969

General characteristics
- Class & type: Alstede Class Stores Ship
- Type: Cargo/Transport
- Displacement: 14,180 tons (fl)
- Length: 460 ft (140 m)
- Beam: 63 ft (19 m)
- Draught: 26 ft 7 in (8.10 m)
- Propulsion: cross-compound turbines, single propeller
- Speed: 16 kts.
- Complement: 292
- Armament: one 3 in (76 mm)/50 gun mount

USS Bellatrix (AF-62) was an Alstede-class stores ship in service with the United States Navy from 1961 to 1968, following commercial service from 1945 to 1961. She was scrapped in 1969.

== Prior to Commissioning ==
The USS Bellatrix was laid down as the Fleetwood on 16 October 1944 in Oakland, California, by the Moore Dry Dock Company under the Maritime Commission contract. Sponsored by Mrs. Agatha Bittman, hull 1207 was launched on 4 December 1944 and the Fleetwood was delivered on 21 June 1945.

Initially turned over to the United Fruit Company, the Fleetwood sailed in the North Atlantic Ocean under contract until October 1946. Thereafter, she was transferred by the Maritime Commission to the Pacific Far-East Line making numerous cargo runs to ports throughout the Pacific Ocean, including that of the Alaskan waters.

After April 1958, although still operated by the Pacific Far-East Line, the Fleetwood served the Military Sea Transportation Service. On 22 August 1961 the Fleetwood was transferred back to the US Navy, who converted the vessel into a USN stores ship at the Puget Sound Naval Shipyard, with work being completed on 13 October 1961.

The Fleetwood was renamed Bellatrix AF-62, and was re-commissioned on 18 November 1961 at the Puget Sound yard under the command of Nathan E. Dozier.

== Support of ships engaged in nuclear testing ==
Following outfitting and shakedown training based in San Diego, California, the Bellatrix departed from her home port in San Francisco, California on 3 March 1962, beginning her first deployment into the western Pacific.

The Bellatrix provided logistical support for Joint Task Force 8, responsible for Operation Dominic I and II, which tested nuclear weapons at Christmas Island.

The remainder of that deployment was spent re-supplying Navy ships via both underway and in-port replenishment including visits to Yokosuka, Sasebo, Subic Bay, Philippine Islands, Kaohsiung, Taiwan, and Hong Kong.

In June 1962, the Bellatrix returned to San Francisco for an overhaul.

== Vietnam operations support ==
Bellatrix spent the next six years supplying ships of the U.S. 7th Fleet in the Vietnam War. After August 1964, she was concentrated on supporting the fleet operating off the coast of Vietnam. The fleet was tasked with bolstering the defenses of the South Vietnamese Republic.

Until September 1968, Bellatrix alternated between brief periods on the West Coast of the United States, and longer periods off the coast of Vietnam. During that period the Bellatrix visited Nagasaki, Midway Island and Pearl Harbor.

== Decommissioning ==
While an overhaul late in the summer of 1968 was being prepared, the decision was taken to decommission the Bellatrix. Accordingly, she was decommissioned on 30 September 1968, at Hunters Point, California. After being decommissioned, her name was struck from the Naval Vessel Register. The vessel was eventually sold for scrapping to Ridell Explorations Inc. for $36,606.60 on 24 March 1969, under MARAD contract PD-X-824 27 February 1969.

== Military awards and honors ==
Bellatrix AF-62 earned five battle stars during the Vietnam War:

- Vietnam Defense
- Vietnamese Counteroffensive
- Vietnamese Counteroffensive - Phase II
- Vietnamese Counteroffensive - Phase III
- Vietnamese Counteroffensive - Phase IV

Her crew was eligible for the following medals and citations:

- National Defense Service Medal
- Armed Forces Expeditionary Medal (3-Quemoy-Matsu, 7-Vietnam)
- Vietnam Service Medal (5)
- Republic of Vietnam Gallantry Cross Unit Citation (5)
- Republic of Vietnam Campaign Medal
