= USNS Yukon =

USNS Yukon has been the name of more than one United States Navy ship:

- USNS Yukon (T-AO-152), an oiler in service in the Military Sea Transportation Service and Military Sealift Command from 1957 to 1985
- USNS Yukon (T-AO-202), a fleet replenishment oiler in service with the Military Sealift Command since 1994

== See also ==
- USC&GS Yukon
- USS Yukon
