= Yukon (disambiguation) =

Yukon is a territory in the northwest of Canada.

Yukon may also refer to:

== Places ==
=== Yukon ===
- Yukon (electoral district), a federal electoral district of Canada, corresponding to the territory of Yukon
- Fort Yukon, a town in Alaska by the Yukon River
- Yukon Island, an island in south central Alaska
- Yukon River, a river in the state of Alaska, United States, and the territory of Yukon, Canada, for which the territory was named

=== United States ===
- Yukon, Florida, a ghost town in the United States
- Yukon, Georgia, a community in the United States
- Yukon, Missouri, a town in the United States
- Yukon, Oklahoma, a town in the United States
- Yukon, Pennsylvania, a town in the United States
- Yukon, West Virginia, a town in the United States

== Arts, entertainment, and media ==
=== Fictional entities ===
- Yukon, the name of a fictional confederacy in the novel Fitzpatrick's War by Theodore Judson
- Yukon Cornelius, a character in the 1964 TV special Rudolph the Red-Nosed Reindeer.

=== Games ===
- Yukon (solitaire), a single-player card game similar to standard Klondike solitaire
- The Yukon Trail, a computer game similar to The Oregon Trail

=== Music ===
- Yukon (band), a band from Baltimore, Maryland, in the United States
- "Yukon" (song), by Justin Bieber, 2025
- "Yukon (Interlude)", a 2022 song by Joji
- "Yukon", song by German/Swedish industrial metal supergroup Lindemann on their album Skills in Pills

=== Other ===
- Yukon Striker, a B&M Dive Coaster at Canada's Wonderland

== Brands and enterprises ==
- AMD Yukon, a notebook platform
- Yukon Gold (potato), a common Canadian-grown potato
- Yukon Jack (liqueur), a whisky liqueur with honey

== Transportation ==
=== Aircraft ===
- CC-106 Yukon, a Canadian military turboprop airliner and cargo aircraft used in the 1950s and 1960s

=== Ships ===
- HMCS Yukon (DDE 263), a Canadian destroyer launched in 1961 that later became an artificial reef off the coast of San Diego, California
- USC&GS Yukon, the name of more than one United States Coast Survey or United States Coast and Geodetic Survey ship
- USNS Yukon (T-AO-202), a United States Navy fleet replenishment oiler in service with the Military Sealift Command since 1994
- USS Yukon, the name of more than one United States Navy ship

=== Vehicles ===
- GMC Yukon, various full-size sport utility vehicles made by General Motors
- The Giant Yukon and Giant Yukon DISC, mountain bicycles made by Giant Manufacturing

== See also ==
- Klondike Gold Rush, sometimes referred to as the Yukon Gold Rush
- University of Connecticut, often referred to as UConn, a homophone of "Yukon"
- Yukon Gold (disambiguation)
- Yukon, a junior synonym of Scotinotylus, a genus of spiders
