= Great Republic =

Great Republic may refer to the following ships:

- Great Republic (1853 clipper), an extreme clipper
- SS Great Republic (1866), a sidewheel steamship
- USS Pictor (AF-54), a stores ship originally named SS Great Republic
