= SS Great Republic =

SS Great Republic is the name of the following ships:

- SS Great Republic (1866), a passenger-cargo ship built in 1866-67 for the Pacific Mail Steamship Company, and the largest steamship then built in the United States
- USS Pictor (AF-54), a stores ship originally named SS Great Republic
