= Electromation Inc =

US labor law case

- Court: National Labor Relations Board
- Full case name: Electromation, Inc. and International Brotherhood of Teamsters, Local Union No. 1049, AFL–CIO and ‘‘Action Committees,’’ Party of Interest
- Decided: December 16, 1992
- Citations: 309 N.L.R.B. 990, 142 L.R.R.M. 1001 (1992)

Electromation Inc, 309 N.L.R.B. 990 (1992), is a US labor law case related to employer domination of labor organizations.

== Facts ==
Teamsters Local 1049 claimed recognition for collective bargaining at Electromation Inc, which was not unionized. Teamsters claimed that Electromation Inc's practice of using "action committees" to hear worker opinions was an unlawful company union under National Labor Relations Act of 1935 §8(a)(2). The employer told the action committees that it could not continue to work with them, but even though they were discontinued, the Board heard the union's violation charge. Electromation had five 'action committees' to deal with complaints on wages, bonuses, incentive pay, attendance programs and leave policies. There were five employees and a management representative for each one, and the Employees Benefits Manager was also on each committee, who said 'management expected that employee members on the Committees would kind of talk back and forth with the other employees in the plant, get their ideas, and that... anyone [who] wanted to know what was going on, they could go to these people on the Action Committees.'

== Judgment ==
The National Labor Relations Board held, the committees were a §2(5) labor organization and management had dominated it, so there was a §8(a)(2) violation. All members gave opinions. The Board suggested that, although Electromation's committees were a sham management tool, an independent employee elected work council faced no difficulty under the NLRA 1935 §8(a)(2).

Chairman Stephens said the following in his opening judgment.

As the Cabot Carbon Court explained in detail, Taft-Hartley House and Senate conferees rejected a proposed new Section 8(d)(3) passed by the House that would have expressly permitted forming or maintaining by an employer of a committee of employees and discussing with it matters of mutual interest, including grievances, wages, hours of employment, and other working conditions in the absence of a certified or recognized bargaining representative. The conference report as finally approved by the House and Senate did not contain the House's proposed new Section 8(d)(3) or any similar language. Instead, Section 9(a) was amended. Examining this legislative history, the Cabot Carbon Court noted that Section 8(a)(2) remained wholly unchanged and, with respect to Section 9(a), the Court found that there was nothing in the amendment of Section 9(a) that authorized an employer to engage in dealing with an employer-dominated labor organization. (Note: In view of this legislative history, we do not agree with Member Raudabaugh that the Taft-Hartley amendments fundamentally altered the import of Sec. 8(a)(2) or the collective-bargaining model of the Wagner Act. Even with the safeguards proposed by Member Raudabaugh, the legislative history lends no support to the notion that an employer permissibly may now deal with a dominated Sec. 2(5) labor organization concerning terms and conditions of employment.)

Notwithstanding that dealing with is broadly defined under Cabot Carbon, it is also true that an organization whose purpose is limited to performing essentially a managerial or adjudicative function is not a labor organization under Section 2(5). In those circumstances, it is irrelevant if the impetus behind the organization's creation emanates from the employer. See General Foods Corp., 231 NLRB 1232 (1977) (employer created job enrichment program composed of work crews of entire employee complement); Mercy-Memorial Hospital, 231 NLRB 1108 (1977) (committee decided validity of employees' complaints and did not discuss or deal with employer concerning the complaints); John Ascuaga's Nuggett, 230 NLRB 275, 276 (1977) (employees' organization resolved employees' grievances and did not interact with management).

Dennis M. Devaney said the following.

... legislative history, binding judicial precedent, and Board precedent provide significant latitude to employers seeking to involve employees in the workplace. In my view, Section 8(a)(2) prohibits a specific form of employer conduct. It is not a broad-based ban on employee/employer communications. (Note: As the Supreme Court noted, Respondents argue that to hold these employee committees to be labor organizations would prevent employers and employees from discussing matters of mutual interest concerning the employment relationship, and would thus abridge freedom of speech in violation of the First Amendment of the Constitution. But the Board's order does not impose any such bar; it merely precludes the employers from dominating, interfering with or supporting such employee committees which Congress has defined to be labor organizations. [NLRB v. Cabot Carbon Co., 360 U.S. 203, 218 (1959).]) Thus, adjudication of the dealings between an employer and an employee organization must begin with an understanding of exactly what harms to Section 7 rights Section 8(a)(2) was intended to prevent and a targeting of Section 8(a)(2) enforcement at exactly those harms.

I base these conclusions on the following observations. First a pure employee participation plan was not before Congress in 1935 and has never been before the Supreme Court. Second, the legislative history of the Wagner Act, although replete with expressions of outright alarm over the development of employer-dominated sham unions, shows virtually no concern over employer-initiated programs concerned with efficiency, quality, productivity, or other essentially managerial issues. Third, Board law itself has also recognized that employer-supported committees may take forms that are lawful under Section 8(a)(2). Based on the above, I would answer the question, posed by one amicus, thus: Section 8(a)(2) should not create obstacles for employers wishing to implement employee involvement programs—as long as those programs do not impair the right of employees to free choice of a bargaining representative.

John N. Raudabaugh analyzed §2(5) and said it was clear this was a labor organization, unless the legislation was changed. On §8(a)(2) he said that the NLRA 1935 was passed on the theory of an adversarial, rather than a cooperative collective labor relations model. The cooperative view was fully taken into account and rejected. However the amendment in the LMRA 1947 made the issue very different, and Newport News would not have been decided the same. Taft-Hartley Act emphasized employee free choice to participate in a union or not.

Similarly, if employers and employees can amicably resolve their differences through cooperation, that would seem consistent with Taft-Hartley's encouragement of peaceful methods of resolving disputes.

He acknowledged that Senator Taft had rejected attempts to change §8(a)(2) but the NLRB should reflect modern changes in its judgment. Employee participation plans can be allowed. The test would be (1) extent of employer's involvement (2) whether employees think it is a collective bargaining substitute (3) whether employees had their §7 right to have a union safe (4) the employer's motive. No one decisive. Applied, here, the first criteria fails because there was no say in the committee structure, and there was no assurance of a right to collectively bargain.

== See also ==
- United States labor law
