= Golden Rocket =

Golden Rocket may refer to:

- The Golden Rocket (song), a Hank Snow song popular in 1951
- Golden Rocket (train), a proposed named passenger train of the Rock Island (CRIP) and Southern Pacific (SP) railroads
- The 1956 Oldsmobile Golden Rocket concept car, presented at the 1957 Paris Auto Show
- La Banda del Golden Rocket, a 1991 television series
- USS Zelima (AF-49), a ship called Golden Rocket during ordering
