= USS Yellowstone (ID-2657) =

Cargo ship of the United States Navy

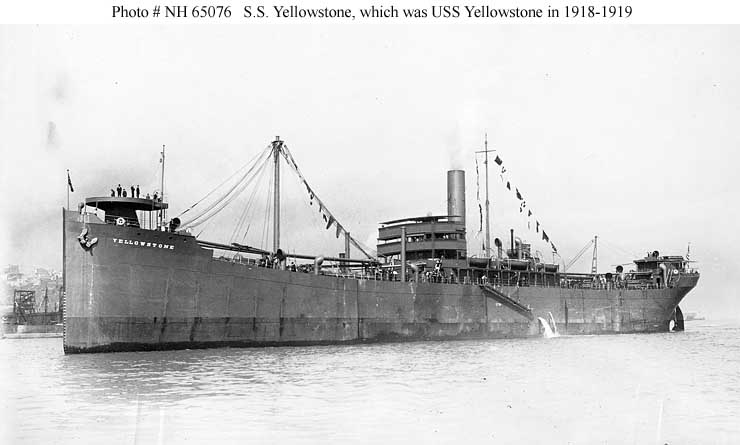
- SS Yellowstone at Oakland, California, on 20 April 1918 during her builder's trials and before her commissioning as USS Yellowstone.

History

United States
- Name: USS Yellowstone
- Builder: Moore and Scott Shipbuilding Company, Oakland, California
- Launched: 9 December 1917
- Completed: April 1918
- Acquired: 27 May 1918
- Commissioned: 21 September 1918
- Decommissioned: 24 May 1919
- Stricken: 24 May 1919
- Fate: Returned to United States Shipping Board 24 May 1919; Wrecked 10 December 1920
- Notes: Operated as SS Yellowstone 24 May 1919 – 10 December 1920

General characteristics
- Type: Cargo ship
- Tonnage: 6,171 Gross register tons
- Displacement: 12,570 tons
- Length: 416 ft 6 in (126.95 m)
- Beam: 53 ft 0 in (16.15 m)
- Draft: 26 ft 3 in (8.00 m) (mean)
- Depth: 34 ft 6 in (10.52 m)
- Propulsion: Steam, one shaft
- Speed: 10 knots (19 km/h; 12 mph)
- Complement: 79
- Armament: none

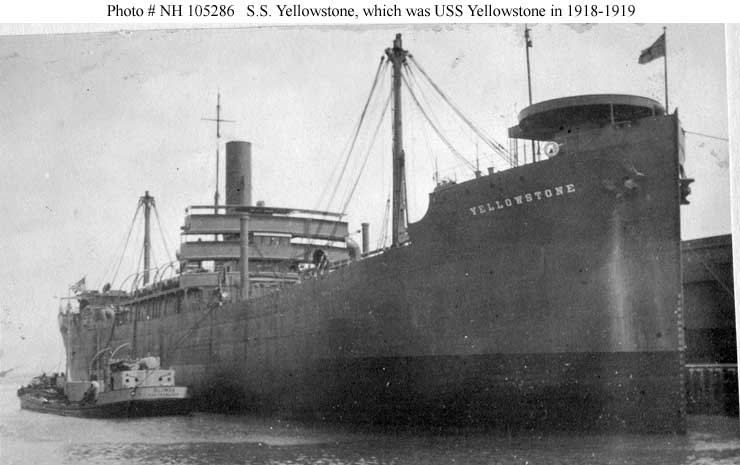
SS Yellowstone in 1918, probably at or near her builder's yard in Oakland, California, and prior to her commissioning as USS Yellowstone.

The first USS Yellowstone (ID-2657) was a cargo ship of the United States Navy that served during World War I and its immediate aftermath.

== Construction and acquisition ==
The Moore and Scott Shipbuilding Company in Oakland, California launched a steel-hulled, single-screw commercial cargo ship originally named SS Passatt, SS War Boy, or SS War Buoy (Note: The Dictionary of American Naval Fighting Ships gives the ship's original name as War Boy; NavSource gives it as War Buoy, and the Naval History and Heritage Command Online Library of Selected Images stated that "Earlier names reported for this ship were Passatt and War Boy or, more likely, War Buoy".) on 9 December 1917. Renamed SS Yellowstone, she was completed in April 1918 and came under the control of the United States Shipping Board.

The U.S. Navy's 12th Naval District inspected Yellowstone with an eye toward using the ship as a depot collier during World War I and assigned her the identification number 2657. She steamed from California to Philadelphia, where the Navy took control of her for operation with the Naval Overseas Transportation Service. She was commissioned at the shipyard of William Cramp & Sons in Philadelphia as USS Yellowstone (ID-2657) on 21 September 1918.

== Navy service ==
Soon after her commissioning, Yellowstone moved to New York City, where she arrived on 24 September 1918. She underwent repairs at the Morse Drydock and Repair Company yards in Brooklyn, New York, and suffered additional damage in a minor sideswiping collision with the British-registered merchant ship Moorish Prince on 13 October 1918. After repairs to the damage she suffered in her collision with Moorish Prince, Yellowstone shifted to Pier 5 at Bush Terminal in Brooklyn on the morning of 15 October 1918 and over the next few days took on board 6,672 tons of general cargo – including automobiles and locomotives – earmarked for American forces in France.

On 27 October 1918, Yellowstone got underway in convoy for France, "proceeding under confidential orders on [United States] Army transport duty to port of debarkation," St. Nazaire. The war ended on 11 November 1918 while Yellowstone was en route to France. On 14 November 1918 she arrived at Quiberon Bay. She remained at anchor there until she received onward routing to St. Nazaire. There, she discharged her cargo and began taking on "return" cargo for transport to the United States, including "aeroplane parts." After shifting briefly to the St. Nazaire roadstead, Yellowstone departed the French coast, proceeding independently, on 27 November 1918.

On 15 December 1918, only two days from New York, Yellowstone sighted a derelict three-masted schooner and altered course to close. She discovered the water-logged Joseph P. Cooper of Mobile, Alabama, abandoned with her decks and cabin awash and with her forerigging gone and her forecastle smashed in. Joseph P. Cooper looked like she had been adrift from six to eight weeks. After leaving the derelict, Yellowstone continued her passage and arrived at Pier 5, Bush Terminal, in Brooklyn on 17 December 1918. Shifting to Pier 1 at the end of December, she spent a week at anchor off the Statue of Liberty before returning to Bush Terminal and, later, shifting to the U.S. Army docks at Brooklyn. There, from 17 to 25 January 1919, Yellowstone took on board 5,150 tons of supplies and, on 25 January 1919, got underway for France.

During the crossing, Yellowstone ran into a heavy gale on 4 February 1919. She rolled considerably at the outset, shipping water and spray amidships, and labored heavily in the storm. On 9 February 1919, with the storm still showing no signs of abating, Yellowstone's steering gear failed. Soon both auxiliary systems – steam- and hand-powered – also failed. Pumping oil through waste pipes in an attempt to break the force of the waves, Yellowstone wallowed through the storm while her engineers worked to repair the casualty. By 12 February, Yellowstone was once again able to use her steering gear effectively.

Yellowstone anchored at Quiberon Bay at 0953 on 14 February 1919. Her troubles were not over, however, as she grazed the jetty wall while entering the locks at St. Nazaire. At 0545, the engineer officer reported to the captain that two boilers were under water and the steam was cut off. As Yellowstone moored alongside the nearby quay, her crew broke out a tarpaulin and collision mat. Soon thereafter, Yellowstone, still with way on, nudged into the bridge walk of the lock. By 0630, under tow by a French tug, she reached a safe basin, where she dropped both anchors and her crew began to take stock of the situation. Divers examining the damage reported that a hole, six inches (15 cm) in width, had been opened up in Yellowstone's side, extending from a point 10 feet (3.0 meters) beneath the waterline and about six feet (1.8 meters) in length. Drydocked on 11 March 1919, Yellowstone grazed the French passenger ship SS Alesia that morning, causing minor damage to Alesia's railings on her promenade deck and boat deck.

Undocked upon completion of her hull repairs on 6 April 1919, Yellowstone loaded a return cargo of structural iron for use as ballast, barbed wire, and 6-inch (152-mm) artillery pieces. On 19 April 1919, she shifted from St. Nazaire to Brest, France, and got underway the next day for the United States. Mooring at Pier 3, Bush Terminal, Brooklyn, on 7 May 1919, she unloaded through mid-month.

== Decommissioning and transfer ==
At noon on 24 May 1919, a United States Shipping Board crew reported aboard Yellowstone, and, at 1247 that day, Yellowstone was decommissioned and simultaneously stricken from the Navy list and returned to the Shipping Board. (Note: Although both official Navy sources give the date of decommissioning as 24 May 1919, NavSource gives it as 7 May 1919, apparently confusing her arrival date at Bush Terminal with her decommissioning date 17 days later.)

== Later career ==
Once again SS Yellowstone, the ship entered commercial service under the control of the Shipping Board. On 10 December 1920, (Note: The Dictionary of American Naval Fighting Ships states that the ship had a "short career" after her decommissioning and ran aground on 10 December 1929, a date indicating over 10 years of post-decommissioning commercial service and inconsistent with a "short" career. The Naval History and Heritage Command Online Library of Selected Images corrects the date to 10 December 1920, and NavSource also states a stranding date of 10 December 1920.) she dragged her anchors due to high winds and ran hard aground off Ponta Delgada on São Miguel Island in the Azores. She was listed as "stranded" and a total loss, but her entire crew of 45 men was saved.
