= USNS Blue Jacket =

Alstede-class US military stores ship

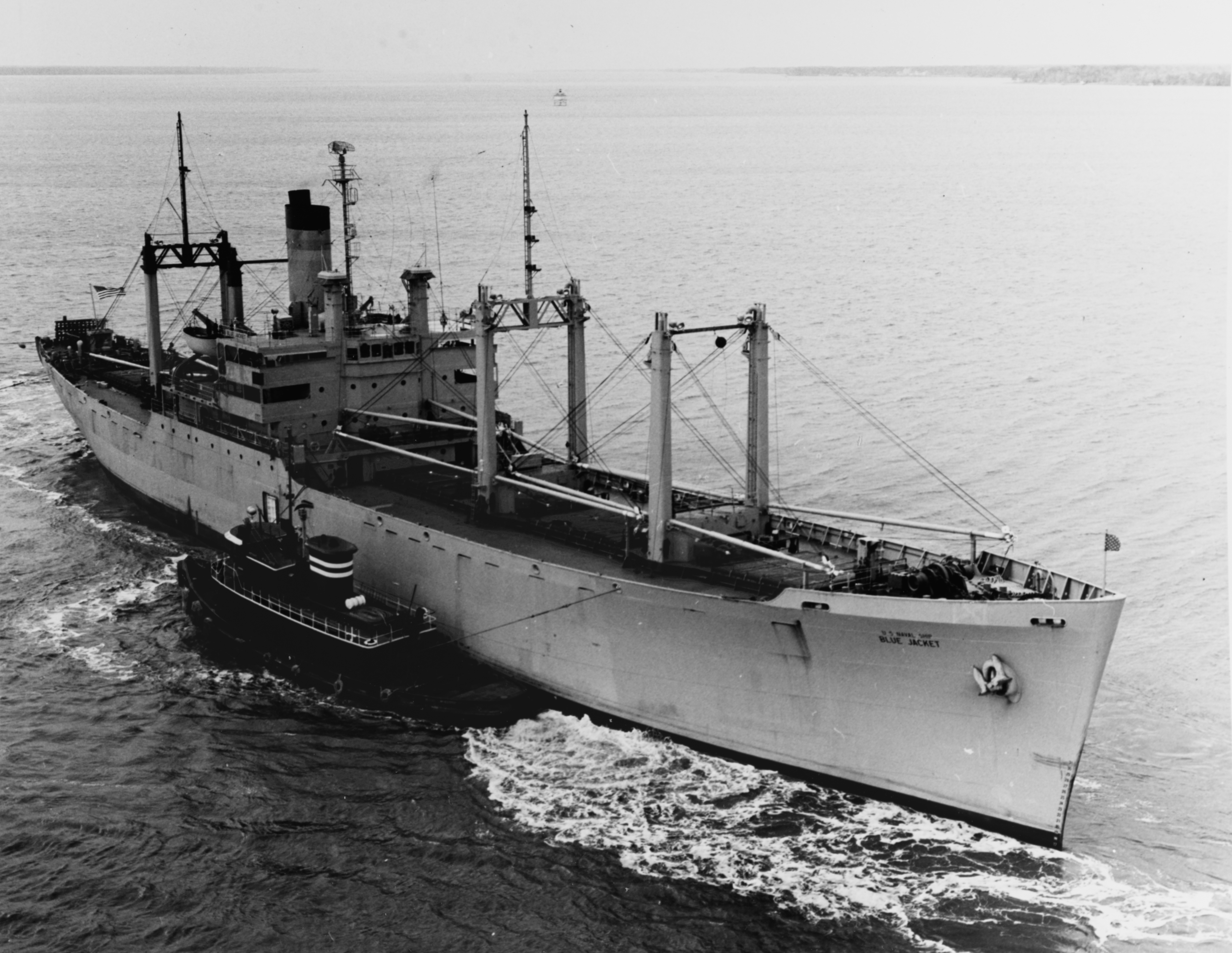

History

United States
- Ordered: a C2-S-B1 type freighter, MC hull 183
- Laid down: 23 October 1941
- Launched: 14 February 1942
- Completed: 23 March 1943
- Acquired: 1 March 1950
- Commissioned: 1 March 1950
- Decommissioned: 19 August 1970
- Stricken: 19 October 1971
- Fate: Sold for scrapping, 1 March 1973

General characteristics
- Displacement: 6,329 t.(lt) 13,893 t.(fl)
- Length: 459 ft 3 in (139.98 m)
- Beam: 63 ft (19 m)
- Draught: 25 ft 9 in (7.85 m)
- Speed: 12.5 knots
- Complement: 55
- Armament: none

USNS Blue Jacket (T-AF-51) was an Alstede-class stores ship in service the United States Navy Military Sea Transportation Service from 1950 to 1971. She was scrapped in 1973.

== History ==
Blue Jacket—a C2-S-B1 type freighter—was laid down under a United States Maritime Commission contract (MC hull 183) on 23 October 1941 at Oakland, California, by the Moore Dry Dock Co.; launched on 14 February 1942; sponsored by Mrs. Edward U. Read; and delivered to her operators, the United Fruit Co., on 25 March 1943.

During World War II, she was operated by the United Fruit Company, then in 1947 by the Black Diamond Steamship Corporation and, after return to the Maritime Commission in 1948, by the U.S. Army under charter. Blue Jacket was acquired from the U.S. Army in 1950 as a refrigerator ship, T-AF-51, and assigned to the Military Sea Transportation Service (MSTS), Atlantic Area. On 27 December 1953 she rescued 36 survivors of the Swedish ship Oklahoma that broke in two and sank in a storm the previous day 400 miles (640 km) northeast of St. John's, Newfoundland and Labrador, Canada. She operated as such, lifting cargoes of various kinds (mostly consisting of refrigerated stores) between the United States and European ports through the late 1960s. The vessel was taken out of service with MSTS on 19 August 1970,

Blue Jacket was transferred on that day to the temporary custody of the Maritime Administration for lay-up in the James River, Virginia. On 1 September 1971, she was transferred to the permanent custody of that agency; and her name was struck from the Navy list on 19 October 1971. Sold to Andy International, Inc., of Houston, Texas, on 1 March 1973, the ship was later scrapped.

== Military awards and honors ==
Blue Jacket's crew was eligible for the following medals:

- National Defense Service Medal (1)
