= Moore Dry Dock Company =

Shipyard in Oakland, California, United States

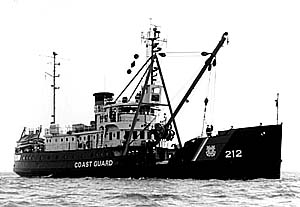
USS Fir (WAGL 212)

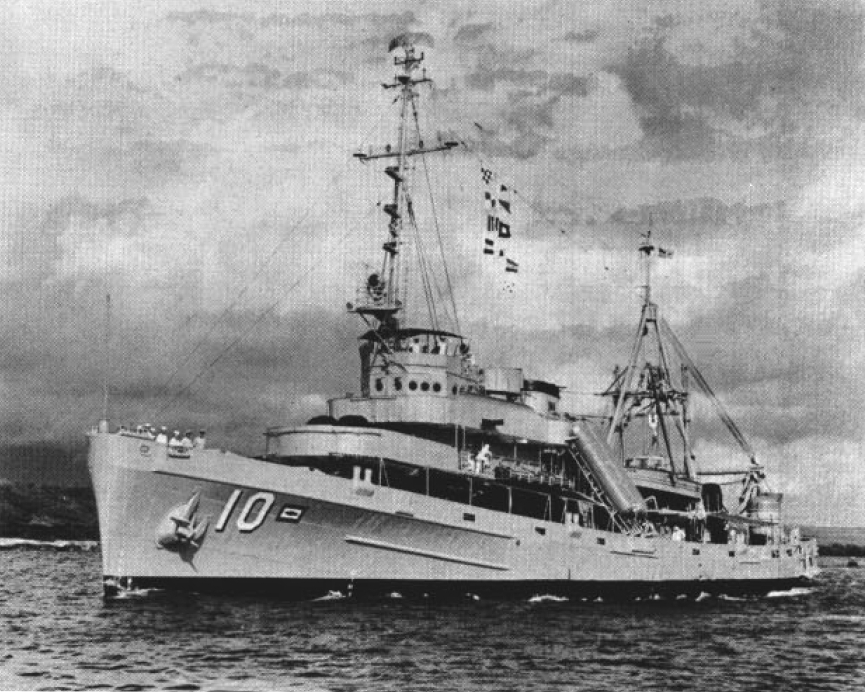
USS Greenlet leaving Pearl Harbor, Hawaii in 1963

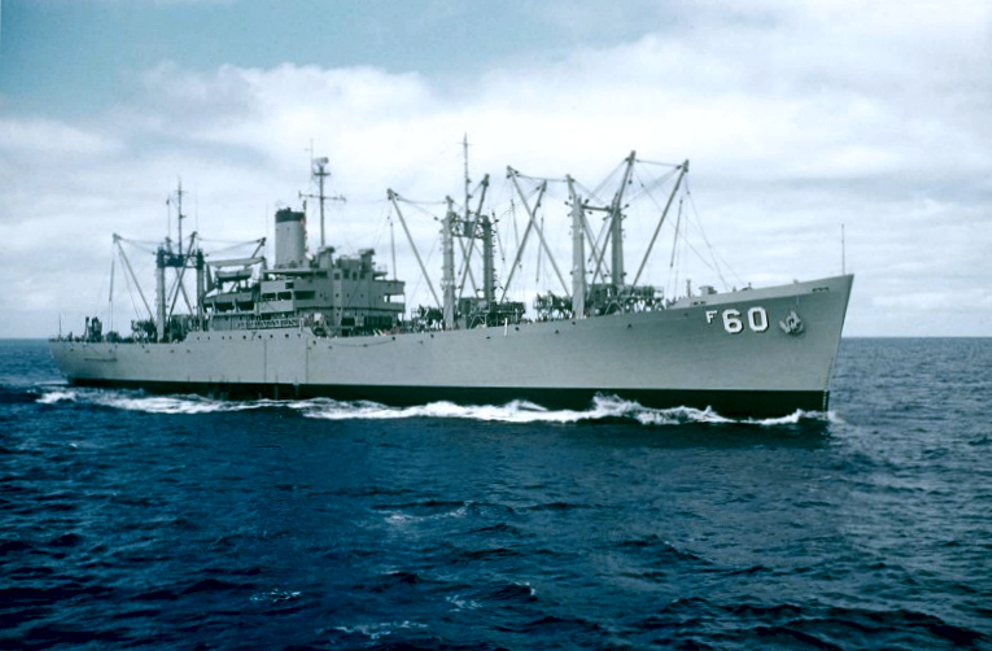
USS Sirius (AF-60)

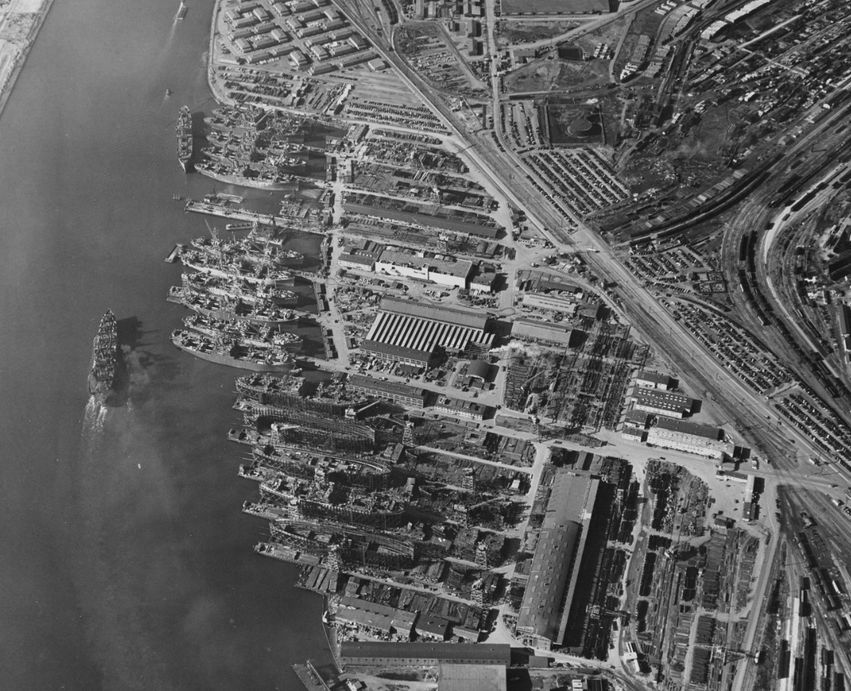
Moore Dry Dock Company in 1943

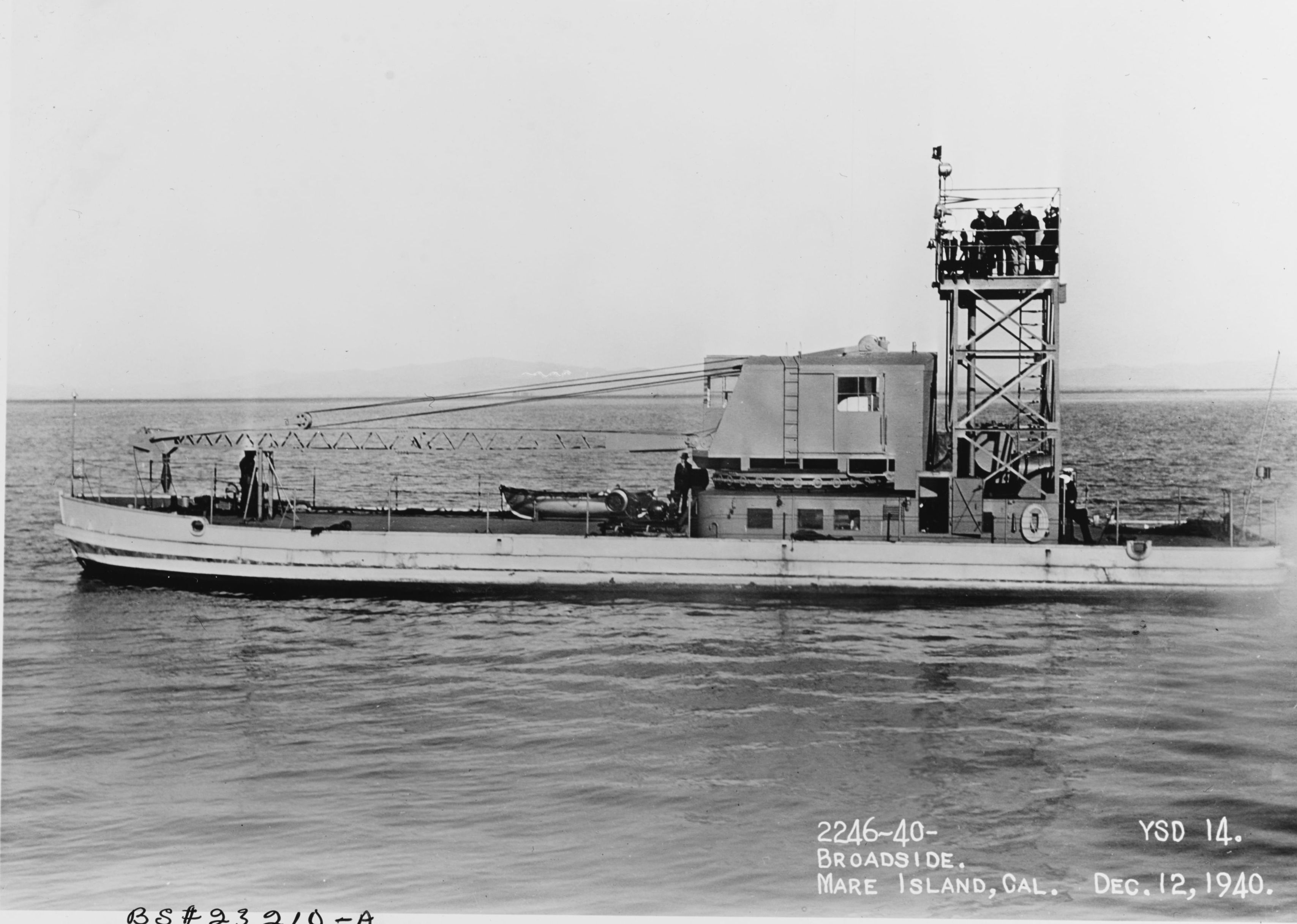
Seaplane Wrecking Derrick - YSD

Moore Dry Dock Company was a ship repair and shipbuilding company in Oakland, California. In 1905, Robert S. Moore, his brother Joseph A. Moore, and John Thomas Scott purchased the National Iron Works located in the Hunter's Point section of San Francisco, and founded a new company, the Moore & Scott Iron Works Moore had previously been vice president of the Risdon Iron Works of San Francisco. Scott was nephew to Henry T. and Irving M. Scott, owners of the nearby Union Iron Works, where John had risen from apprentice to superintendent. Their new business was soon destroyed by fire resulting from the San Francisco earthquake.

In 1909, Moore and Scott decided to move across the Bay, and so purchased the W. A. Boole & Son Shipyard, located in Oakland at the foot of Adeline Street along the Oakland Estuary.

In 1917, Moore bought out Scott and changed the business name to Moore Shipbuilding Company. Henry T. Scott and John T. Scott tried to establish a rival business with the Pacific Coast Shipbuilding Company, an enterprise that eventually did not outlive the World War I shipbuilding boom. The Design 1015 ship was also called the Moore & Scott Type.

In 1922, Moore Shipbuilding renamed to the Moore Dry Dock Company, operating primarily as a repair yard, amidst a severe lack of demand for new construction in the 1920s and early 1930s. Its shipbuilding capabilities were again promptly expanded for the World War II boom, providing over 100 ships for the U.S. Navy and merchant marine. Moore ranked 82nd among United States corporations in the value of World War II military production contracts. Shipbuilding ceased at war's end, but repair operations continued.

In 1950, the Moore facility was the target of a union picket when sailors were having a dispute with a ship owner whose ship was in Moore's dry dock at the time. The court battle which ensued eventually led to the Moore Dry Dock Standards for Primary Picketing at a Secondary Site (Sailors' Union of the Pacific (Moore Dry Dock Co.), 92 NLRB 547, 27 LRRM 1108 (1950)).

Moore Dry Dock Company ceased operations in 1961. Its site at Adeline Street on the Oakland Estuary was acquired by Schnitzer Steel (now Radius Recycling).

== W. A. Boole & Son ==
18 May 1901, the Lahaina, the first ship built in Oakland, is launched from the yard of W. A. Boole & Son at the foot of Adeline street. Adeline street is at the easternmost part of the property that later makes up Moore.

June 1901, a 3000-ton marine railway built by H. I. Crandall & Son of Massachusetts becomes operational in the Boole shipyard.

26 March 1909, it is announced that Moore & Scott have acquired the Boole shipyard for ca. $500,000.

Yard#	Owner	Type	Name	Launched	Notes
(1)	Hind, Rolph & Co	4-mast barkentine	Lahaina	18 May 01	
		4-mast barkentine	Koko Head	11 Jan 02	
	W. A. Gray	passenger+cargo steam schooner	Prentiss		
	Hind, Rolph & Co	4-mast barkentine	Makaweli	10 May 02	
	Santa Fe Railroad Co.	tug	A. H. Payson	21 Jun 02	
	Hind, Rolph & Co	4-mast barkentine	Puako	18 Oct 02	
	United States Revenue Cutter Service	wooden-hulled revenue cutter	Arcata	3 Jan 03	
	North Shore RR Co.	stern wheel steam ferry	Lagunitas	31 Jan 03	
		twin-screw gasoline schooner	Expansion	7 Feb 04	
	W. H. Marston	800hp oil burning 3-exp schooner	Sibyl Marston	29 Jun 07	wrecked 12 January 1909

== World War 1 ==
For World War 1 Moore Shipbuilding Company built for the US Shipping Board a number of ships, including some that become Empire ships:

Yard#	USSB#	Name	Owner	Type	Tons	Delivered	Notes
12		Sagaland / Mount Shasta	US Shipping Board / Requisition	Cargo	4,729	1-Dec-17	Sunk as target 1931
113		War Bay / Coronado	US Shipping Board / Requisition	Cargo	5,989	15-Jan-18	Scrapped in 1937
114		Nordgren / Yosemite	US Shipping Board / Requisition	Cargo	6,077	3-Feb-18	Scrapped in 1938
115		War Buoy / Yellowstone	US Shipping Board / Requisition	Cargo	6,171	20-Apr-18	Wrecked in the Azores 1920
116		War Beacon / Pasadena	US Shipping Board / Requisition	Cargo	6,002	11-May-18	Scrapped in 1936
117		War Breeze / Oakland	US Shipping Board / Requisition	Cargo	6,002	30-May-18	Scrapped in 1933
118		War Coast / Fresno	US Shipping Board / Requisition	Cargo	6,002	21-Jun-18	Scrapped in 1936
119	143	Shintaka / Alloway	US Shipping Board / Contract	1015 Cargo	6,113	5-Jul-18	Wrecked in the Ugamaks 1929
120	144	Aniwa	US Shipping Board / Contract	1015 Cargo	6,012	24-Jul-18	Scrapped in 1929
121	145	Oskawa	US Shipping Board / Contract	1015 Reefer	6,100	6-Jan-19	To Britain as "Empire Raven" 1942, "Southern Raven" 1948, Scrapped in 1952
122	146	Yamhill	US Shipping Board / Contract	1015 Reefer	6,101	21-Sep-18	renamed "Arctic" 1921, Scrapped in 1946
123	147	Yaquina	US Shipping Board / Contract	1015 Reefer	6,100	14-Feb-19	To USN as "Boreas" (AF 8) 1921, Scrapped in 1946
124	148	Guimba	US Shipping Board / Contract	1015 Reefer	6,100	7-Jun-19	To Britain as "Empire Merganser" 1942, renamed "Ketos" 1947, exploded and sank 1951
125	149	Zaca	US Shipping Board / Contract	1015 Cargo	6,165	30-Dec-18	Burnt off Trinidad 1920, Scrapped in 1924
126	150	Zirkel	US Shipping Board / Contract	1015 Cargo	6,073	27-Sep-18	Scrapped in 1929
127	151	Kamesit	US Shipping Board / Contract	1015 Cargo	6,070	29-Jan-19	Scrapped in 1930
128	152	Keketticut	US Shipping Board / Contract	1015 Cargo	6,072	7-Jun-19	Scrapped in 1930
129	1015	Chipchung	US Shipping Board / Contract	1015 Cargo	6,163	7-Jun-19	Scrapped in 1929
130	1016	Mulpua	US Shipping Board / Contract	1015 Cargo	6,139	14-Jun-19	Scrapped in 1929
131	1017	Monasses	US Shipping Board / Contract	1015 Reefer	5,983	19-Jul-19	To Britain 1942 as "Empire Whimbrel", torpedoed and lost 11 April 1943
132	1018	Tuckanuck	US Shipping Board / Contract	1015 Cargo	6,001	24-Jul-19	Scrapped in 1929
133	1019	Cotati	US Shipping Board / Contract	1015 Reefer	5,963	26-Aug-19	To Britain 1942 as "Empire Avocet", torpedoed and lost 29 September 1942
134	1020	Nokatay	US Shipping Board / Contract	1015 Cargo	6,036	27-Sep-19	Scrapped in 1929
135	1021	Nockum	US Shipping Board / Contract	1015 Reefer	6,024	31-Dec-19	To Britain 1941 as "Empire Starling", torpedoed and lost 1942
136	1022	Mehanno	US Shipping Board / Contract	1015 Reefer	5,969	12-Mar-20	To USN as USS Yukon (AF-9) 1921, Scrapped in 1946
137	1023	Naugus	US Shipping Board / Contract	1015 Cargo	6,037	22-Apr-20	Scrapped in 1930
138	1024	Quilliwark	US Shipping Board / Contract	1015 Cargo	6,034	26-Jun-20	Scrapped in 1929
139	1025	Imlay	US Shipping Board / Contract	1041 Tanker	7,005	26-Sep-19	renamed "R. M. Parker, Jr." 1941, torpedoed and lost 1942
140	1025	Miskianza	US Shipping Board / Contract	1041 Tanker	6,910	3-Feb-20	renamed "Gulf of Venezuela" 1925, Scrapped in 1950
141	1027	Quabbin	US Shipping Board / Contract	1041 Tanker	7,017	24-Mar-20	renamed "Cape Cod" 1923, "Emma H. Coppedge" 1926, "Oregon" 1929, shelled and lost 1942
142	1028	Nebagamon / City of Reno	US Shipping Board / Contract	1041 Tanker	7,004	17-May-20	renamed "Tejon" 1923, Scrapped in 1947
143	1029	Begwaduce / Salina	US Shipping Board / Contract	1041 Tanker	7,311	25-Jun-20	renamed "Garnet Hulings" 1928, Scrapped in 1954
144	1030	Sapulpa	US Shipping Board / Contract	1041 Tanker	7,311	28-Jul-20	renamed "Cape Ann" 1923, "Helen Olmsted" 1927, "Washington" 1929, "San Nicolas" 1946, "Norma" 1947, Scrapped in 1955
145	2233	Jalapa	US Shipping Board / Contract	1015 cargo	6,085	2-Oct-20	renamed "Klamath" 1940, to Russia 1943 as "Lunacharski", Scrapped in 1960
146	2234	Mosella	US Shipping Board / Contract	1015 cargo	6,034	31-Aug-20	To Britain 1941 as "Empire Heron", torpedoed and lost 1941
147	2235	Janelew	US Shipping Board / Contract	1015 cargo	6,085	30-Oct-20	To Britain 1941 as "Empire Plover", renamed "Plover" 1949, "Marianne" 1951, "Nicolas" 1956, Scrapped in 1958
148	2236	Mursa	US Shipping Board / Contract	1015 cargo	6,085	15-Oct-20	renamed "General M. H. Sherman" 1928, "Kainalu" 1938, to Britain 1940 as "Pachesham", "Fenix" 1948, "Nisshu Maru" 1951, Scrapped in 1961
149	2237	Narbo	US Shipping Board / Contract	1015 cargo	6,085	30-Nov-20	Wrecked in The Bahamas and Scrapped in 1945
150	2238	Narcissus	US Shipping Board / Contract	1015 cargo	6,085	30-Dec-20	renamed "Potlatch" 1940, torpedoed and lost 1942
151	2227	Meton	US Shipping Board / Contract	1041 Tanker	7,311	15-Jul-20	Torpedoed and lost 1942
152	2228	Mevania	US Shipping Board / Contract	1041 Tanker	7,311	17-Aug-20	renamed "Vincenzia" 1944, "Aurania" 1947, "Pamavi" 1956, Scrapped in 1959
153	2229	Stockton	US Shipping Board / Contract	1041 Tanker	7,294	25-Sep-20	renamed "Walter Miller" 1928, "Olney" 1935, Scrapped in 1947
154	2862	Bohemian Club	US Shipping Board / Contract	1041 Tanker	6,882	24-Jul-21	Scrapped in 1947
155	2863	Tustem	US Shipping Board / Contract	1041 Tanker	6,882	30-Jul-21	Scrapped in 1946
156	2864	Lubrico	US Shipping Board / Contract	1041 Tanker	7,095	19-Aug-21	renamed "R. J. Hanna" 1936, Scrapped in 1947

== World War 2 ==
For the US war effort, Moore Dry Dock Company built:

- Type C3-class cargo ships.
- 82 of 328 type C2 United States Maritime Commission cargo designs C2-S-A1 and C2-S-B1. Some were converted to AP Troopships.
- Ashland-class dock landing ships, Dock landing ships a type of Amphibious warfare ship.
- Type R refrigerated cargo ships, also called Reefer ships, design R2-S-BV1.
- Seaplane derricks, design class YSD-11. A Crane Ship.
- 2 of 7 Fulton-class submarine tenders.
- 5 of 9 Chanticleer-class Submarine rescue ships.

== World War 2 Ships ==
Hull #	USSB #	Ship ID	Original Name	Original Owner	Type	Tons GT	Delivered	Notes
193			Walnut (WAGL 252)	US Coast Guard	Tender	885d	27-Jun-39	To Honduras in 1982 renamed Yojoa
194			Fir (WAGL 212)	US Coast Guard	Tender	885d	1-Oct-40	Now a museum ship in Sacramento CA
195	51	239692	Sea Arrow	Maritime Comm.	C3	7,773	8-Jul-40	To USN in 1940 renamed USS Tangier (AV-8), Sold in 1961 renamed Detroit, scrapped 1974
196	52	240208	Sea Star	Maritime Comm.	C3	7,773	30-Jan-41	To USN in 1942 renamed EUSS Elizabeth C. Stanton (AP-69), Sold in 1946 renamed Mormacstar, later Jacqueline Someck 1961, National Seafarer 1964, scrapped 1967
197	136	240378	Mormacstar	Maritime Comm.	C3	7,773	14-Mar-41	Sold in 1941 renamed Mormacsea, scrapped 1968
198	137	240541	Mormacsun	Maritime Comm.	C3	7,773	8-Jun-41	To USN in 1942 renamed Florence Nightingale (AP 70), Sold in 1946 renamed Mormacsun, later Japan Transport 1953, Texrenamed 1959, scrapped 1970
199			No name	US Navy	Caisson		20-May-41	For Pearl Harbor Naval Shipyard
200			No name	US Navy	Caisson		23-Aug-41	For Pearl Harbor Naval Shipyard
201	175		Alcoa Courier	Maritime Comm.	C2-S-A1	7,486	20-Sep-42	To USN in 1942 renamed Tryon (APH 1), to USA 1946 renamed SGT Charles E. Mower, to USN in 1950 renamed AP 186, scrapped 1969
202	176		Alcoa Corsair	Maritime Comm.	C2-S-A1	7,486	27-Nov-42	To USN in 1942 renamed USS Pinkney (APH 2), to USA 1946 renamed PVT Elgon H. Johnson, to USN in 1950 renamed AP 184, scrapped 1971
203	177		Alcoa Cruiser	Maritime Comm.	C2-S-A1	7,486	30-Dec-42	To USN in 1942 renamed USS Rixey (APH-3), to USA 1946 renamed PVT William H. Thomrenamed, to USN in 1950 renamed AP 186, scrapped 1971
204			YNG 16	US Navy	Gate Tender	110	4-Jun-41	Sold in 1977
205			YNG 17	US Navy	Gate Tender	110	18-Jun-41	renamed IX 539 in 2007
206			YNG 18	US Navy	Gate Tender	110	23-Jun-41	Later barge Wynne, now Hightide Barge 18
207			Chanticleer (ASR 7)	US Navy	Salvage Ship	1,653	20-Nov-42	Scrapped 1974
208			Coucal (ASR 8)	US Navy	Salvage Ship	1,653	22-Jan-43	Sunk as target 1991
209			Florikan (ASR 9)	US Navy	Salvage Ship	1,653	3-Apr-43	To be sunk as target
210			Greenlet (ASR 10)	US Navy	Salvage Ship	1,653	25-May-43	To Turkey 1970 renamed Akin (A 585), active
211			Macaw (ASR 11)	US Navy	Salvage Ship	1,653	12-Jul-43	Wrecked and lost at Midway 1944
212			Orion (AS 18)	US Navy	Sub Tender	15,250	30-Sep-43	Scrapped 2006
213			Proteus (AS 19)	US Navy	Sub Tender	15,250	31-Jan-44	To USN renamed IX 518, scrapped 2007
			YSD 35	US Navy	Seaplane Derrick	240	1943	Lost
			YSD 36	US Navy	Seaplane Derrick	240	1943	Lost on 9 August 1946 off Okinawa
			YSD 37	US Navy	Seaplane Derrick	240	1943	Lost off Eniwetok 10 December 1946
			YSD 42	US Navy	Seaplane Derrick	240	1943	lost off Guam May 1976
			YSD 43	US Navy	Seaplane Derrick	240	1943	Lost Lost off Eniwetok October 1946
			YSD 44	US Navy	Seaplane Derrick	240	1943	
			YSD 45	US Navy	Seaplane Derrick	240	1943	
			YSD 46	US Navy	Seaplane Derrick	240	1943	To National Defense Reserve Fleet (NDRF) in 1974
			YSD 47	US Navy	Seaplane Derrick	240	1943	
			YSD 48	US Navy	Seaplane Derrick	240	1943	Typhoon Louise at Okinawa, 9 October 1945, Lost
			YSD 49	US Navy	Seaplane Derrick	240	1943	
			YSD 50	US Navy	Seaplane Derrick	240	1943	
214	183		Blue Jacket	Maritime Comm.	C2-S-B1	6,180	23-Mar-43	To USN in 1950 renamed AF 51, scrapped 1973
215	184		Golden Eagle	Maritime Comm.	C2-S-B1	6,180	23-Apr-43	To USN in 1950 renamed AF 52, renamed Arcturus 1961, sunk renamed target 1997
216	185		Trade Wind	Maritime Comm.	C2-S-B1	6,178	30-Apr-43	To USN in 1956 renamed USS Sirius (AF-60), Sold in 1971, burnt and scrapped 1972
217	186		Bald Eagle	Maritime Comm.	C2-S-B1	6,178	28-May-43	To USN in 1950 renamed AF 50, scrapped 1973
218	187		Great Republic	Maritime Comm.	C2-S-B1	6,178	29-Jun-43	To USN in 1950 renamed Pictor (AF 54), scrapped 1987
219	188		Flying Scud	Maritime Comm.	C2-S-B1	6,178	18-Aug-43	To USN in 1961 renamed Procyon (AF 61), scrapped 1987
220	284	242701	Hotspur	Maritime Comm.	C2-S-B1	6,130	18-Jan-43	To USN in 1943 renamed La Salle (AP 102), Sold in 1946 renamed Hotspur, later Stonewall Jackson 1948, John C 1953, wrecked in the Paracels and scrapped 1968
221	285	242785	Dashing Wave	Maritime Comm.	C2-S-B1	6,103	17-Feb-43	As troopship, Sold in 1948 renamed Choctaw, scrapped 1970
222	286	243034	Young America	Maritime Comm.	C2-S-B1	6,111	30-Mar-43	As troopship, Sold in 1948, scrapped 1968
223	287	243008	Typhoon	Maritime Comm.	C2-S-B1	6,108	28-Feb-43	As Troopship, Sold in 1948 renamed Mobilian, later Ocean Joyce 1955, renamed Joyce 1961, Sapphire Sandy 1965, Richwood 1967, Grand Ranger 1970, wrecked and abandoned 1971
224	288	254616	Twilight / Ormsby	Maritime Comm.	C2-S-B1	8,228	10-Mar-43	Renamed AP 94 Troopship, later APA 49, Sold in 1947 renamed American Producer, in collision and scrapped 1969
225	289	254670	Northern Light / Pierce	Maritime Comm.	C2-S-B1	8,250	30-Jun-43	As AP 95 Troopship, later APA 50, Sold in 1947 renamed American Planter, scrapped 1969
226	290	254653	Messenger / Sheridan	Maritime Comm.	C2-S-B1	8,239	30-Jul-43	To USN in 1943 renamed AP 96, later APA 51, Sold in 1947 renamed American Scientist, exploded and scrapped 1970
227	291	243982	Titan	Maritime Comm.	C2-S-B1	8,315	30-Jul-43	Sold in 1948 renamed American Packer, scrapped 1970
228	292	243873	Meteor	Maritime Comm.	C2-S-B1	8,231	20-Jul-43	Sold in 1948 renamed American Miller, scrapped 1970
229	293	244020	Comet	Maritime Comm.	C2-S-B1	8,257	17-Aug-43	To USN in 1943 renamed AP 166, Sold in 1948 renamed Pioneer Reef, later Australian Reef 1965, scrapped 1970
230	294	244133	John Land	Maritime Comm.	C2-S-B1	6,119	25-Aug-43	To USN in 1943 renamed AP 167, Sold in 1949 renamed Jeff Davis, later Sea Comet II 1953, Santa Regina 1957, African Gulf 1961, Norberto Capay 1963, scrapped 1969
231	295		Mary Whitridge / Catoctin	Maritime Comm.	C2-S-B1	6,214	31-Aug-43	To USN in 1943 renamed AGC 5, scrapped 1959
232			Ashland (LSD 1)	US Navy	Assault Ship	9,375	5-Jun-43	Scrapped 1970
233			Belle Grove (LSD 2)	US Navy	Assault Ship	9,375	9-Aug-43	Scrapped 1970
234			Carter Hall (LSD 3)	US Navy	Assault Ship	9,375	18-Sep-43	Scrapped 1970
235			Epping Forest (LSD 4)	US Navy	Assault Ship	9,375	11-Oct-43	Scrapped 1970
236			Gunston Hall (LSD 5)	US Navy	Assault Ship	9,375	10-Nov-43	To Argentina 1970 renamed Candido de Lrenamedala (Q 43), scrapped 1982
237			Lindenwald (LSD 6)	US Navy	Assault Ship	9,375	5-Dec-43	Scrapped 1968
238			Oak Hill (LSD 7)	US Navy	Assault Ship	9,375	5-Jan-44	Scrapped 1970
239			White Marsh (LSD 8)	US Navy	Assault Ship	9,375	29-Jan-44	To Taiwan 1960 renamed Tung Hai (L 191), renamed Chung Cheng, replaced 1985
240	1153		James Baines/Algol	Maritime Comm.	C2-S-B1	6,214	27-Nov-43	To USN in 1943 renamed AKA 54, later LKA 54 1969, to NDRF 1989
241	1154	244215	War Hawk	Maritime Comm.	C2-S-B1	6,214	18-Nov-43	To USN in 1943 renamed AP 168, Sold in 1954 renamed Ocean Dinny, renamed Dinny 1966, scrapped 1971
242	1155		Golden Gate	Maritime Comm.	C2-S-B1	6,214	14-Dec-43	Sold in 1946 renamed Copiapo, renamed Hellenic Halcyon 1966, scrapped 1973
243	1156	244287	Winged Arrow	Maritime Comm.	C2-S-B1	6,214	6-Dec-43	To USN in 1943 renamed AP 170, Sold in 1948 renamed Fairhope, later Susan 1954, Noordzee 1955, Green Bay 1959, Winged Arrow 1962, wrecked 1965 and scrapped 1970
244	1157	244612	Sovereign of the Seas	Maritime Comm.	C2-S-B1	6,214	29-Feb-44	Completed by Western P. & S., Sold in 1948 renamed Agwidale, later Oriente 1950, Short Hills 1954, Jean 1955, Oceanic Tide 1964, scrapped 1969
245	1158	245338	White Swallow	Maritime Comm.	C2-S-B1	6,214	26-Apr-44	Completed by Western P. & S., Sold in 1947 renamed Mormacowl, later Old Westbury 1969, scrapped 1969
246	1159		Mischief / Arneb	Maritime Comm.	C2-S-B1	8,328	16-Nov-43	To USN in 1943 renamed AKA 56, redesignated LKA 56 1969, scrapped 1973
247	1160		Spitfire / Capricornus	Maritime Comm.	C2-S-B1	8,328	23-Nov-43	To USN in 1943 renamed AKA 57, redesignated LKA 57 1969, to NDRF 1983
248	1161	244750	Herald of the Morning	Maritime Comm.	C2-S-B1	6,134	30-Nov-43	To USN in 1943 renamed AP 173, Sold in 1948 renamed Citrus Packer, later Gulf Trader 1958, Bowling Green 1965, scrapped 1973
249	1162	244794	Monarch of the Seas	Maritime Comm.	C2-S-B1	8,210	16-Dec-43	Sold in 1947, later Free America 1966, scrapped 1969
250	1163	244881	Red Rover	Maritime Comm.	C2-S-B1	6,214	30-Dec-43	Sold in 1947 renamed Mallory Lykes, later Centerville 1967, scrapped 1970
251	1164	245040	West Wind	Maritime Comm.	C2-S-B1	6,214	22-Jan-44	Sold in 1947 renamed Mormacteal, later North Hills 1965, scrapped 1969
252	1165	244877	Gauntlet	Maritime Comm.	C2-S-B1	6,214	13-Jan-44	Sold in 1947 renamed African Grove, scrapped 1969
253	1166	245035	Ann McKim	Maritime Comm.	C2-S-B1	6,214	31-Jan-44	Sold in 1947 renamed African Glade, later Transoceanic Peace 1969, scrapped 1970
254	1167	244678	Golden City	Maritime Comm.	C2-S-B1	6,133	31-Dec-43	To USN in 1943 renamed AP 169, Sold in 1948, renamed Ocean Eva 1955, renamed Eva 1961, Sapphire Etta 1965, Cortland 1967, scrapped 1973
255	1168	245135	Rainbow	Maritime Comm.	C2-S-B1	6,108	10-Feb-44	Sold in 1947 renamed Virginia Lykes, scrapped 1973
256	1169	245459	Flyaway	Maritime Comm.	C2-S-B1	6,214	8-Apr-44	Sold in 1947 renamed Charles E. Dant, later Utah 1957, Santa Malta 1957, Santa 1970, wrecked and scrapped 1970
257	1170	245198	Pampero	Maritime Comm.	C2-S-B1	6,214	28-Feb-44	Sold in 1947 renamed Agwiking, later Siboney 1950, Plandome 1954, Emilia 1954, Taddei Village 1963, wrecked 1964
258	1171		Oriental	Maritime Comm.	C2-S-B1	6,214	18-Feb-44	Sold in 1947 renamed Maipo, later Hellenic Charm 1966, scrapped 1974
259	1172	245322	Celestial	Maritime Comm.	C2-S-B1	6,214	20-Mar-44	Sold in 1947, later Natalie 1956, Yukon 1964, Sapphire Gladys 1965, Digby 1967, Grand Madonna 1968, scrapped 1972
260	1173	245431	Archer	Maritime Comm.	C2-S-B1	6,214	31-Mar-44	Sold in 1947 renamed African Pilgrim, scrapped 1973
261	1174	245245	Defiance	Maritime Comm.	C2-S-B1	6,214	9-Mar-44	Sold in 1947 renamed Helen lykes, later Salisbury 1967, scrapped 1971
262	1175	245337	Ringleader	Maritime Comm.	C2-S-B1	6,214	28-Mar-44	Sold in 1947 renamed Mormacdove, scrapped 1968
263	1176	245532	Wideawake	Maritime Comm.	C2-S-B1	6,214	15-Apr-44	Sold in 1947, later Rebecca 1956, Overserenamed Rebecca 1961, Oceanic Spray 1964, scrapped 1967
264	1177		Flying Mist	Maritime Comm.	C2-S-B1	6,214	21-Apr-44	Sold in 1947 renamed Imperial, later Hellenic Dolphin 1965, scrapped 1974
265	1178	245548	Westward Ho	Maritime Comm.	C2-S-B1	6,214	29-Apr-44	Sold in 1947 renamed Marion Lykes, later Aimee Lykes 1948, scrapped 1972
266	1179	245623	Morning Light	Maritime Comm.	C2-S-B1	6,214	5-May-44	Sold in 1947, later Vantage Progress 1966, scrapped 1970
267	1180		Highflier	Maritime Comm.	C2-S-B1	6,214	12-May-44	Exploded and sank 1947
268	1181	245725	Mandarin	Maritime Comm.	C2-S-B1	6,214	20-May-44	Sold in 1947 renamed African Pilot, scrapped 1974
269	1182	245795	Argonaut	Maritime Comm.	C2-S-B1	6,214	27-May-44	Sold in 1947 renamed African Patriot, scrapped 1974
270	1183	245853	Flying Yankee	Maritime Comm.	C2-S-B1	6,214	8-Jun-44	Sold in 1947 renamed Margaret Lykes, scrapped 1973
271	1184	245914	Eagle Wing	Maritime Comm.	C2-S-B1	6,214	14-Jun-44	Sold in 1947 renamed Mormacwren, later Erenamedt Hills 1965, scrapped 1969
272	1185	245964	Neptune's Car	Maritime Comm.	C2-S-B1	6,214	22-Jun-44	Sold in 1947 renamed Barbara Lykes, later Whitehall 1963, scrapped 1973
273	1186		Ocean Telegraph	Maritime Comm.	C2-S-B1	6,214	30-Jun-44	Sold in 1947 renamed Aconcagua, later Hellenic Sunbeam 1965, scrapped 1973
274	1187	246038	Belle of the West	Maritime Comm.	C2-S-B1	6,214	8-Jul-44	Sold in 1947 renamed Agwiqueen, later Seaborne 1949, Santa Mariana 1957, Santa Clara 1962, Thunderhead 1963, scrapped 1969
275	1188		Wild Pigeon / Uvalde	Maritime Comm.	C2-S-B1	6,214	18-Aug-44	To USN in 1944 renamed AKA 88, scrapped 1969
276	1189		Black Prince/Warrick	Maritime Comm.	C2-S-B1	6,214	30-Aug-44	To USN in 1944 renamed AKA 89, renamed target 1971, sunk
277	1190		Wings of the Morning/Whiteside	Maritime Comm.	C2-S-B1	6,214	11-Sep-44	To USN in 1944 renamed AKA 90, renamed target 1971, sunk
278	1191		Whitley	Maritime Comm.	C2-S-B1	6,214	21-Sep-44	To USN in 1944 renamed AKA 91, to Italy 1962 renamed Etna (A 5328), scrapped 1979
279	1192		Wyandot	Maritime Comm.	C2-S-B1	6,214	30-Sep-44	To USN in 1944 renamed AKA 92, later AK 283 1969, to NDRF 1987
280	1193		Yancey	Maritime Comm.	C2-S-B1	6,214	11-Oct-44	To USN in 1944 renamed AKA 93, to NDRF 1989
281	1194	246732	Golden West	Maritime Comm.	C2-S-B1	6,214	19-Oct-44	Sold in 1948 renamed American Chief, scrapped 1969
282	1195	246798	Hurricane	Maritime Comm.	C2-S-B1	6,214	31-Nov-44	Sold in 1947, later Amerigo 1966, Ruthlena 1971, scrapped 1972
283	1196	246897	Nonpareil	Maritime Comm.	C2-S-B1	6,214	22-Nov-44	Sold in 1947 renamed Letitia Lykes, later Falmouth 1967, scrapped 1970
284	1197	247000	Flying Cloud	Maritime Comm.	C2-S-B1	6,214	30-Dec-44	Scrapped 1972
285	1198	247139	Expounder/Wild Hunter	Maritime Comm.	C2-S-B1	6,214	25-Jan-45	Sold in 1947 renamed Oregon, later Santa Victoria 1957, Sooner State 1960, Reliance Dignity 1970, scrapped 1971
286	1199	247201	Whirlwind	Maritime Comm.	C2-S-B1	6,214	10-Feb-45	Sold in 1948 renamed American Builder, scrapped 1973
287	1200	247268	Flying Arrow	Maritime Comm.	C2-S-B1	6,214	28-Feb-45	Sold in 1947, later Santa Cristina 1957, Green Cove 1961, scrapped 1971
288	1201	247294	Golden Racer	Maritime Comm.	C2-S-B1	6,214	22-Feb-45	Sold in 1947 renamed African Glen, wrecked in Suez Canal 1967, refloated 1977
289	1202		Matchless	Maritime Comm.	R2-S-BV1	6,177	23-Mar-45	To USN in 1952 renamed Aludra (AF 55), Sold in 1979 renamed Aleutian Monarch, burnt and scuttled 1981
290	1203	247296	Wild Wave	Maritime Comm.	C2-S-B1	6,214	30-Mar-45	Sold in 1946 renamed American Veteran, later Transoceanic Explorer 1968, scrapped 1970
291	1204	247590	Robin Hood/Belle of the Sea	Maritime Comm.	C2-S-B1	6,214	20-Apr-45	Sold in 1947 renamed American Press, later Canterbury Falcon 1967, scrapped 1971
292	1205	247556	Flying Dragon	Maritime Comm.	R2-S-BV1	6,177	28-Apr-45	Scrapped 1974
293	1206		Ocean Chief	Maritime Comm.	R2-S-BV1	6,177	4-May-45	To USN in 1946 renamed Alstede (AF 48), scrapped 1970
294	1207		Fleetwood	Maritime Comm.	R2-S-BV1	6,177	21-Jun-45	To USN in 1961 renamed USS Bellatrix (AF-62), scrapped 1969
295	1208	248212	Sparkling Wave	Maritime Comm.	C2-S-B1	6,214	14-Jul-45	Sold in 1946 renamed Empire State, later Reliance Fidelity, scrapped 1971
296	1209	247417	Water Witch	Maritime Comm.	C2-S-B1	6,214	14-Mar-45	Sold in 1946 renamed American Flyer, to USN in 1965 renamed USNS Flyer (AG 178), scrapped 1976
297	1210	247842	Contest	Maritime Comm.	R2-S-BV1	6,177	28-May-45	Scrapped 1973
298	1211	248033	Queen of the Seas	Maritime Comm.	C2-S-B1	6,214	13-Jun-45	Sold in 1947 renamed Mormachawk, scrapped 1968
299	1212		Golden Rocket	Maritime Comm.	R2-S-BV1	6,177	16-Jul-45	To USN in 1946 renamed USS Zelima (AF 49), scrapped 1981
300	1213	247643	Lookout	Maritime Comm.	C2-S-B1	6,214	26-Apr-45	Sold in 1948 renamed American Manufacturer, later Transoceanic Enterprise 1967, scrapped 1970
301	1214		Wild Rover	Maritime Comm.	C2-S-B1	6,214	12-May-45	Sold in 1947 renamed Mormackite, sank off Cape Henry 1954
302	1215	247841	Asterion	Maritime Comm.	C2-S-B1	6,214	19-May-45	Sold in 1947 renamed Sylvia Lykes, scrapped 1970
303	1216	248050	Coringa	Maritime Comm.	C2-S-B1	6,214	22-Jun-45	Sold in 1948 renamed Agwidawn, renamed 1949, Santa Alicia 1957, Green Point 1960, scrapped 1969
304	1217	248074	Carrier Pigeon	Maritime Comm.	C2-S-B1	6,214	30-Jun-45	Sold in 1946 renamed Pioneer Wave, later American Forester 1957, scrapped 1970

== Shipbuilding in Oakland and Alameda ==
The area of the Port of Oakland was a major shipbuilding center of the Bay Area during the war peaks that started in 1916 and 1940 and ended in 1922 and 1946. Like for the rest of the country, shipbuilding either came to a complete halt for many of the yards or proceeded at a much reduced rate in the interwar years due to the saturation of the market and during a time of arms reduction treaties and economic austerity.

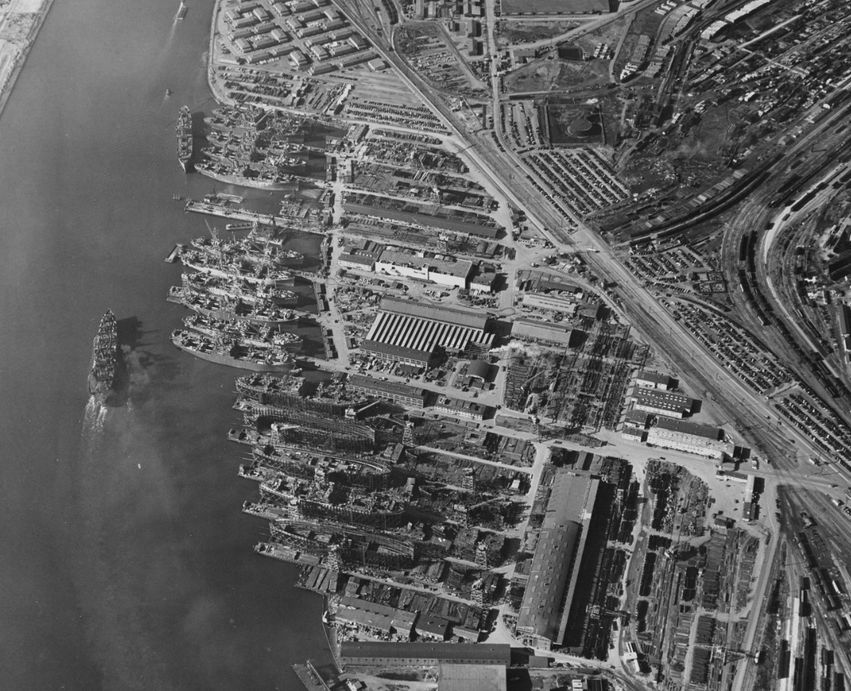
Moore Dry Dock at its peak in 1943

- Outer Harbor
  - Union Construction Company (1918 — 1922) 37.81727°N 122.31549°W
- Inner Harbor, north bank
  - Moore Dry Dock Company (1910 — 1956) 37°47′49.1″N 122°17′24.5″W
  - Hanlon Dry Dock and Shipbuilding (1918 — 1921) 37.78894°N 122.26242°W
  - Cryer & Sons
- Inner Harbor, south bank
  - United Engineering Co. (1941 — 1945) 37.79085°N 122.29075°W
    - later Todd Shipyards, San Francisco Division repair yard
  - Alameda Works Shipyard (1916 — 1924, 1942 — 1945) 37°47′13″N 122°16′31″W
    - formerly United Engineering Works (1900 — 1916)
  - Pacific Bridge Company 37.77752°N 122.25436°W
  - General Engineering & Dry Dock Company 37.775815°N 122.250845°W
  - Pacific Coast Engineering
  - Stone Boat Yard

See also

- California during World War II#Ship building
- USSB reports

== See also ==
- Emergency Shipbuilding program
- List of shipbuilders and shipyards
- California during World War II
- Maritime history of California

== Bibliography ==
- Lane, Frederic C. Ships for Victory. Baltimore: The Johns Hopkins University Press, 2001. ISBN 0-8018-6752-5
- Arroyo, Cuahutémoc (Faculty Mentor: Professor Leon F. Litwack). "Jim Crow" Shipyards: Black Labor and Race Relations in East Bay Shipyards During World War II. The Berkeley McNair Journal, The UC Berkeley McNair Scholars Program. - downloaded from Jim Crow Museum of Racist Memorabilia at Ferris State University on 19 August 2007
- Veronico, Nicholas A. World War II Shipyards by the Bay. San Francisco: Arcadia Publishing, 2007. Ch. 5 Peninsula and East Bay Shipbuilding. ISBN 978-0-7385-4717-6
- World War II Shipbuilding in the San Francisco Bay Area. Excerpt from Bonnett, Wayne. Build Ships!: San Francisco Bay Wartime Shipbuilding Photographs, 1940-1945. Sausalito, Calif.:Windgate Press, 2000. ISBN 978-0-915269-20-4. Access from National Park Service website 20 August 2007.
- Moore, James R. The Story of Moore Dry Dock Company: A Picture History. Sausalito, Calif.:Windgate Press, 1994. ISBN 978-0-915269-14-3
- Moore Dry Dock Company. Progress. Oakland, 1920 (OCLC 47048256)
