= USS Sirius (AF-60) =

US Navy stores ship

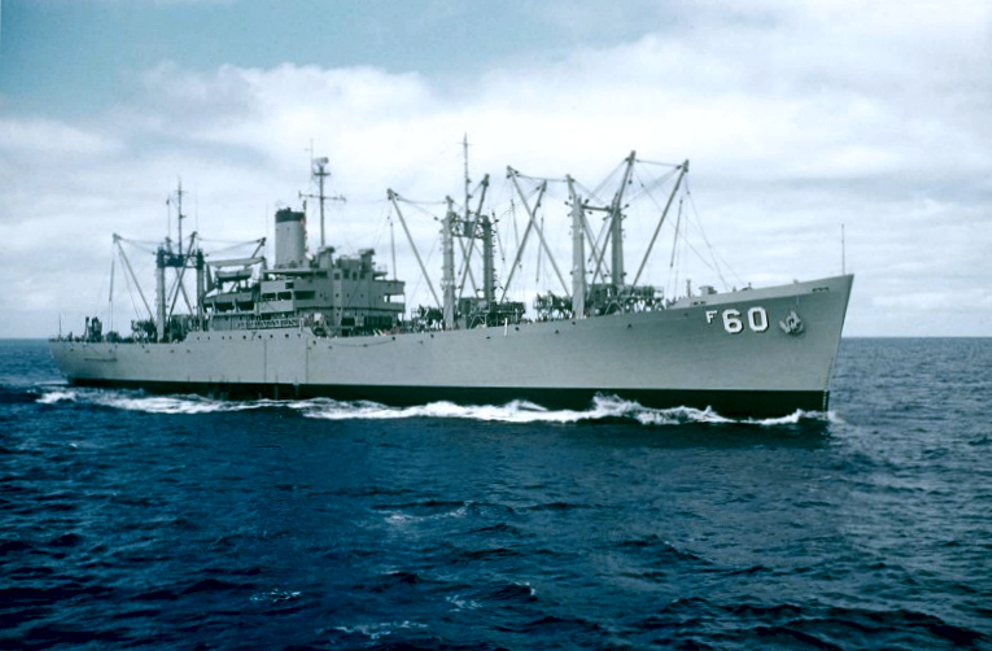

History

United States
- Name: USS Sirius
- Laid down: 5 January 1942
- Launched: 11 April 1942
- Acquired: by the US Navy, 18 May 1956
- Commissioned: 12 January 1957
- Decommissioned: 1964
- Stricken: 1 August 1965
- Fate: Sold, 13 April 1971

General characteristics
- Type: Type C2-S-B1 hull
- Displacement: 7,430 long tons (7,549 t) light; 13,893 long tons (14,116 t) full
- Length: 459 ft (140 m)
- Beam: 63 ft (19 m)
- Draft: 27 ft (8.2 m)
- Propulsion: 600psi cross compound steam turbine, single propeller
- Speed: 17 knots (31 km/h; 20 mph)
- Complement: 278
- Armament: None

USS Sirius (AF-60) was a Alstede-class stores ship in service with the US Maritime Administration from 1943, and acquired by the United States Navy in 1956. Her task was to carry stores, refrigerated items, and equipment to ships in the fleet, and to remote stations and staging areas.

Sirius was laid down on 5 January 1942 as SS Trade Wind (MC hull 185) by Moore Dry Dock Company at Oakland, California, launched on 11 April 1942, sponsored by Mrs. Olga Johnson, and delivered to the Maritime Administration on 30 April 1943.

== Service history ==
Sirius was acquired by the U.S. Navy from the Maritime Administration on 18 May 1956 and commissioned on 12 January 1957 at San Francisco, California. On 26 April, she sailed for Sasebo, Japan, arriving on 14 May. Sirius spent most of her commissioned service plying between ports in the Far East and with the 7th Fleet. She supplied fleet units in Japan; Hong Kong, the Philippine Islands; Okinawa; and Taiwan. Sirius was struck from the Navy List on 1 August 1965 and returned to the Maritime Administration, and sold to West Waterway Lumber Co., Seattle, Washington, on 13 April 1971.
