= SS Zaca =

United States Navy's fighter ship

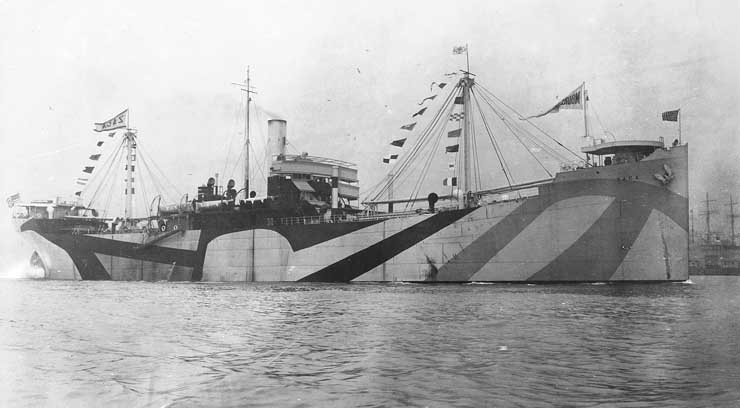
- SS Zaca on trials on 20 December 1918, ten days before commissioning as USS Zaca (ID-3792)

History

United States
- Name: USS Zaca
- Namesake: Probably a Chumash Native American word meaning "village" or "chief"
- Builder: Moore Shipbuilding Company, Oakland, California
- Launched: 24 August 1918
- Completed: 1918
- Acquired: 1918
- Commissioned: 30 December 1918
- Decommissioned: 12 May 1919
- Stricken: 12 May 1919
- Fate: Returned to United States Shipping Board 12 May 1919
- Notes: Operated commercially by United States Shipping Board as SS Zaca from 1919 until 1920; Burned out October 1920; Scrapped January 1924

General characteristics
- Type: Design 1015 ship
- Tonnage: 6,204 GRT
- Displacement: 12,600 tons
- Length: 416 ft 6 in (126.95 m)
- Beam: 53 ft 0 in (16.15 m)
- Draft: 26 ft 5.25 in (8.0582 m) mean
- Propulsion: Steam engine, one shaft
- Speed: 10 knots (19 km/h; 12 mph)
- Complement: 70
- Armament: none

USS Zaca (ID-3792) was a steel-hulled, single-screw freighter that served in the United States Navy from 1918 to 1919. She was the first ship to serve by that name.

Zaca was a Design 1015 ship built under a United States Shipping Board contract and completed as SS Zaca in 1918 at Oakland, California, by the Moore Shipbuilding Company. She was acquired by the U.S. Navy for duty with the Naval Overseas Transportation Service (NOTS). Designated Id. No. 3792, she was commissioned as USS Zaca on 30 December 1918 at her builder's yard.

Following sea trials, Zaca loaded 7,446 tons of flour at the Sperry Mills Dock, Vallejo, California, and got underway from San Francisco Bay on 12 January 1919, bound for the United States East Coast. While in the Panama Canal Zone, the freighter took on board 41 passengers for transportation to Norfolk, Virginia, and transited the Panama Canal on 30 January 1919. She arrived in Hampton Roads, Virginia, on 8 February 1919.

Zaca spent a week at Norfolk replenishing and undergoing minor repairs before sailing for European waters on 15 February 1919 with her cargo of flour, which had been consigned by the United States Food Administration for the relief of the hungry people of war-torn Europe in the aftermath of World War I. After arriving at Danzig on 19 March 1919, she discharged her cargo and sailed for the United States on 4 April 1919.

Proceeding via Rotterdam, the Netherlands, and Plymouth, England, Zaca arrived at New York City on 29 April 1919, unloaded her ballast, and was decommissioned on 12 May 1919, the same day on which she was returned to the United States Shipping Board and struck from the Navy List.

As SS Zaca, the ship operated commercially under the flag of the United States Shipping Board until October 1920, when she was burned out by a ruptured fuel oil pipe in her engine room. Her hulk was towed to New York City, where it lay until she was scrapped in January 1924.
