= SS Meteor (1943) =

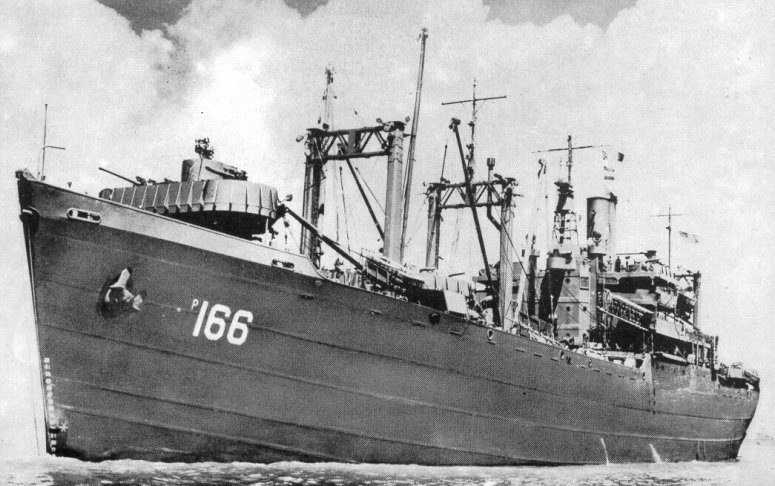
- a C2-S-B1 type ship

History

United States
- Name: Meteor (1943—1947); American Miller (1947-1970)
- Namesake: A Meteor
- Builder: Moore Dry Dock Company, Oakland, California
- Completed: 17 August 1943
- Commissioned: 1944
- Fate: Sold in 1948 renamed American Miller, scrapped in 1970

General characteristics
- Class & type: C2-S-B1 Cargo, then troopship
- Displacement: 6,556 tons light; 13,910 tons full load
- Length: 459 ft 2 in (139.95 m)
- Beam: 63 ft (19 m)
- Draft: 23 ft (7.0 m) limiting
- Installed power: Three 250-kilowatt (335-horsepower) 240-volt direct-current diesel ship's service generators; 880 barrels (140 m^{3}) diesel fuel
- Propulsion: One General Electric Steam turbine; two Foster Wheeler D-type boilers 450 psi at 750 degrees; double General Electric main reduction gears; 6,000 horsepower (4.47 megawatts); one shaft; 10,300 barrels (1,640 m^{3}) Navy special fuel oil
- Speed: 16.5 knots (trial)
- Capacity: 2,100 deadweight tons cargo; 10,321 cubic feet (292 cubic meters refrigerated cargo space; 135,935 cubic feet (3,849 cubic meters) non-refrigerated cargo space
- Troops: 1,575 (75 officers, 1,500 enlisted men)
- Complement: 276 (24 officers, 252 enlisted men)
- Armament: 1 × single 5-inch/38-caliber (127-mm) dual-purpose gun mount; 4 × single 3-inch/50-caliber (76.2-mm) dual-purpose gun mounts; 12 × single 20-mm antiaircraft gun mounts
- Notes: Largest boom capacity 10 tons

SS Meteor (MC hull number 292, Type C2-S-B1) was built by the Moore Drydock Co. in Oakland, CA in 1943, and upon completion of construction was pressed into service as a War Shipping Administration (WSA) troop transport vessel. The ship was operated by Mississippi Shipping Company as agents for WSA. It transported troops throughout the Pacific Ocean from 1943 through 1945. It traveled from California to locations such as Hawaii, Eniwetok, Ulithi, Okinawa, Saipan and Guam, among others.

After the war the ship entered the James River reserve fleet on 19 April 1946. Meteor was reconverted to civilian use during early to mid 1947 and sold 12 December 1947 to U.S. Lines to be renamed American Miller. The ship was sold 23 July 1969 to Amercargo Shipping Company. The ship was scrapped in Taiwan 6 March 1970.
