= Yukon Gold =

Yukon Gold may refer to:

- gold in the Yukon, see Geography of Yukon
- Yukon Gold Rush, gold rush in the Yukon (1896-1898)
- Yukon Gold potato, a variety of potato
- Yukon Gold (1952 film), an American western film from 1952
- Yukon Gold (TV series), a 2013 reality show about gold mining in the Yukon

== See also ==
- Yukon (disambiguation)
