= USS Alstede =

Cargo ship of the United States Navy

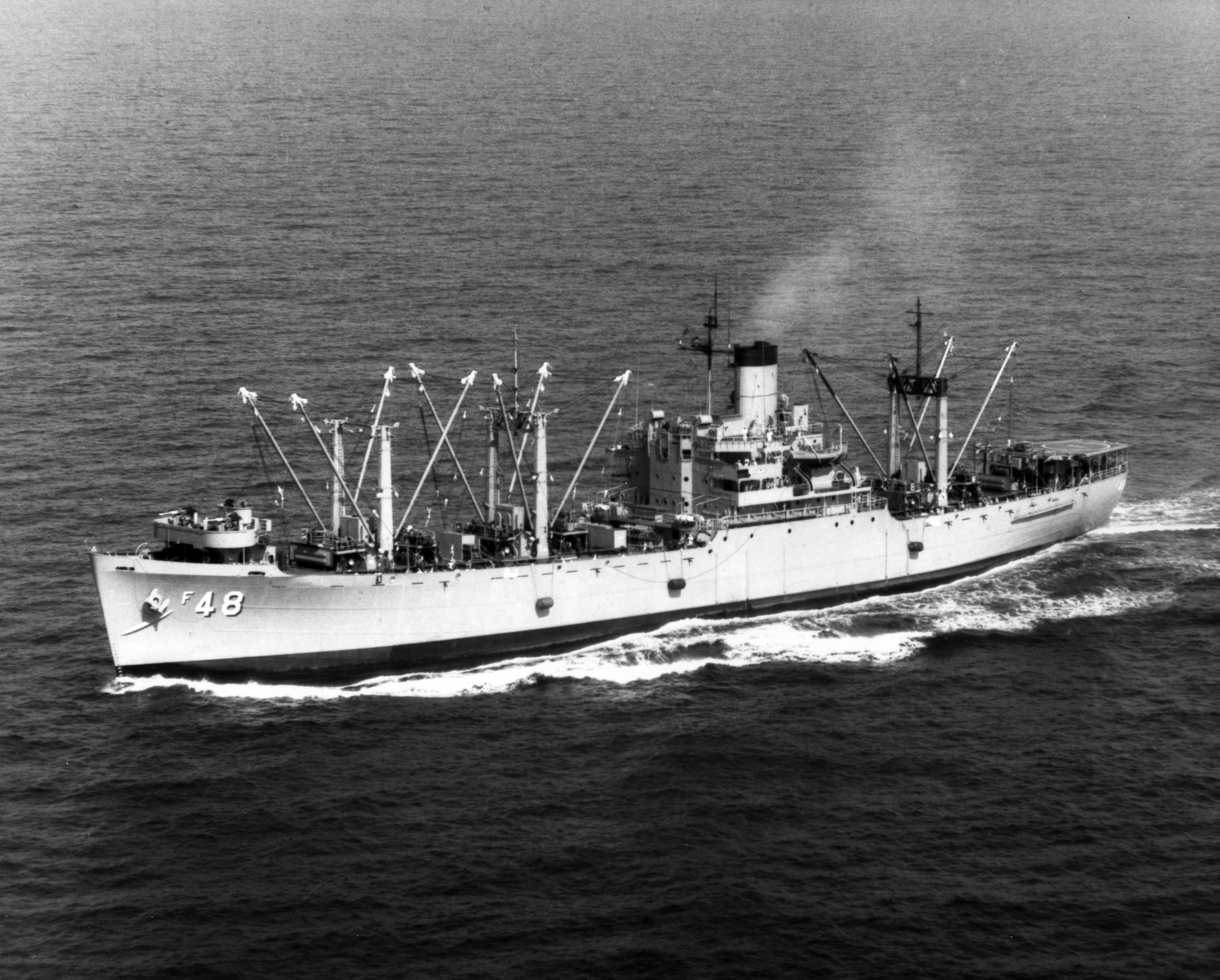
- Alstede in 1966

History

United States
- Ordered: as SS Ocean Chief; R2-S-BV1 hull, MC hull 1206
- Laid down: 30 September 1944
- Launched: 28 November 1944
- Acquired: 10 May 1946
- Commissioned: 17 May 1946
- Decommissioned: 31 October 1969
- Stricken: 31 October 1969
- Fate: Sold, 2 June 1970, for scrapping

General characteristics
- Displacement: 15,500 t.(fl)
- Length: 459 ft 2 in (139.95 m)
- Beam: 63 ft (19 m)
- Draught: 28 ft (8.5 m)
- Propulsion: cross-compound turbines, single propeller
- Speed: 16 kts
- Complement: 292
- Armament: two 40 mm double-barreled guns in bow

USS Alstede (AF-48) was an Alstede-class stores ship acquired by the U.S. Navy at the end of World War II. Her task was to carry stores, refrigerated items, and equipment to ships in the fleet, and to remote stations and staging areas.

Ocean Chief was laid down on 30 September 1944 at Oakland, California, by the Moore Dry Dock Company. under a Maritime Commission contract (MC hull 1206); launched on 28 November 1944; sponsored by Mrs. Anton Wille; and delivered to the War Shipping Administration on 4 May 1945. She was operated by the United Fruit Co. under a contract with the War Shipping Administration for almost exactly one year. Acquired by the Navy on 10 May 1946, she was renamed Alstede; designated store ship AF-48; and commissioned at the Mare Island Naval Shipyard on 17 May 1946.

== Pacific Ocean operations ==
Alstede completed trials and moored at the Naval Supply Depot, Oakland, California, to take on supplies destined for American servicemen participating in the postwar occupation of the islands of the Central Pacific Ocean. For over four years, the store ship made the circuit from the West Coast through the Marshall Islands to the Mariana Islands and back home to the United States. During those voyages, she most frequently visited Kwajalein and Eniwetok in the Marshalls and Guam and Saipan in the Marianas. On the outbound and return legs of those voyages, the ship made calls at Pearl Harbor in Hawaii and frequently stopped at lonely Wake Island. Points of departure and return in the United States included San Diego, Long Beach, Oakland, San Francisco, Bremerton, and Seattle.

Even the outbreak of hostilities in Korea in June 1950 did not at first interrupt her routine. While other American forces rushed to the aid of hard-pressed South Korea, Alstede played no role in the conflict until the end of the year. Initially, that participation consisted only of a single, round-trip voyage to Sasebo, Japan, to deliver stores to that forward base, and back to the U.S. West Coast.

== Korean War operations ==
The last month of 1950 and the first of 1951 brought another circuit through the Marshalls and the Marianas before Alstede began to concentrate more heavily on supporting the struggle of the United Nations to stem the tide of North Korean aggression and to counter Chinese intervention on the side of that aggression. During the second month of 1951, the store ship began round-trip voyages between the West Coast and ports in Japan—notably Yokosuka and Sasebo—to the exclusion of her former Central Pacific ports of call. She made three such voyages in the spring of 1951 before entering the Puget Sound Naval Shipyard for regular overhaul on 27 July 1951. When the ship emerged from the extended repair period on 8 November, she conducted local operations for a short period and then loaded cargo at Oakland. On 8 December, Alstede put to sea bound once more for the western Pacific.

=== Supplying units in Korean waters ===
The advent of 1952 heralded an even closer involvement in the Korean War. Alstede arrived in Sasebo on 18 January 1952 and remained there about three weeks. On 11 February, the ship set sail for a replenishment rendezvous off Wonsan harbor with units of the U.S. 7th Fleet. During the ensuing seven months, the store ship shuttled back and forth between Japan and the American warships operating along the coast of Korea. On three occasions, Alstede entered port at Pusan, Korea, though each time she remained in the harbor but a few hours. The ship returned to Japan from her final replenishment mission of the year on 23 September and visited Sasebo until 2 October then moved to Yokosuka where she remained from 4 to 28 October. Returning to Sasebo on the last day of the month, she spent a week at that port before getting underway for home on 6 November. She arrived back in Oakland, California, on 21 November.

However, her stay in the United States lasted only a month. On 21 December, Alstede returned to sea for another round-trip voyage to Japan. She visited Yokosuka between 6 and 8 January 1953, stopped at Sasebo from the 10th to the 16th, and returned to Yokosuka for three days before heading back to the United States on the 21st. The ship arrived back at Oakland on 4 February and, for the next month, called at several ports on the California coast before standing out of Oakland on 14 March, bound once more for the Far East. She pulled into Sasebo on 1 April and remained there for almost three weeks.

=== Korea and Taiwan areas of responsibility ===
On the 19th, the vessel put to sea to rendezvous with 7th Fleet warships operating off the Korean coast. After transferring stores at sea, she returned to Sasebo on 23 April. For the next three months, Alstede plied back and forth between Japanese ports and the combat zone off the Korean coast to replenish the men-of-war supporting United Nations' troops engaged in the struggle in Korea. At the end of July, she voyaged south from Japan to Taiwan and operated from 3 to 6 August with units of the Taiwan Strait Patrol. From there, the store ship returned north to the southeastern coast of Korea and spent five days—10 to 15 August—near Koje Do, the island where communist prisoners of war were confined. She arrived back in Sasebo on the 15th, visited there and at Yokosuka, and departed the latter port on 26 August. Alstede reached Oakland on 7 September and entered the Mare Island Naval Shipyard on the 11th for her regular overhaul.

== Stateside overhaul ==
She completed overhaul on 18 November and then spent the following four weeks engaged in post-overhaul trials and refresher training. Concluding those evolutions on 14 December, the store ship moored at Treasure Island, California, for the holidays. Underway again on 11 January 1954, the ship moved to Oakland to load supplies in preparation for another tour of duty in the Far East. She put to sea for that deployment on 15 January and arrived in Sasebo on 5 February. She made one replenishment rendezvous with 7th Fleet units off the Korean coast in mid-February and—after a return visit to Sasebo—sailed south on the 21st. The ship called at Manila in the Philippine Islands from 25 February to 1 March and put in at Takao, Taiwan, for a few hours on 6 March before setting course for Japan. She entered port at Yokosuka on 11 March to begin a month's stay before getting underway on 10 April for another swing to the south. That circuit brought visits to Subic Bay in the Philippines, Keelung, Taiwan, and Manila. During her return north, Alstede made a replenishment rendezvous off the Korean coast before reaching Sasebo on 1 May. After a bit more than a month at Sasebo, the store ship got underway again on 3 June, paid a four-day call at Yokosuka on 9 June, and headed for home.

== Reassigned to the Atlantic Fleet ==
Since her return to the United States on 22 June coincided with a reassignment to the Atlantic Fleet, she remained at Oakland only eight days before sailing for Norfolk, Virginia. En route, the store ship stopped at San Diego from 2 to 4 July, arrived at Balboa in the Panama Canal Zone on 12 July, and transited the Panama Canal on the 14th. Alstede moored at her new home port, Norfolk, on 19 July. Over the ensuing three months, the ship engaged in maneuvers and other evolutions in and out of Norfolk. On 11 October, she began taking on supplies in preparation for her first tour of duty with the U.S. 6th Fleet in the Mediterranean Sea and, 11 days later passed between Cape Charles and Cape Henry to begin her first Atlantic crossing. The ship entered the "middle sea" around the end of the month and made her first port call—at Naples, Italy—on 4 and 5 November. Visits to Salonika, Greece, and Valencia, Spain, punctuated her replenishment missions with elements of the 6th Fleet. Alstede made a return call at Naples from 4 to 7 December before setting a course for home. She concluded her first Mediterranean deployment upon arrival back at Norfolk on 23 December.

== Overhaul work at Staten Island and Norfolk ==
Holiday routine and post-deployment leave and upkeep occupied the remainder of 1954 and the first two weeks of 1955. After unloading supplies at the Norfolk Naval Supply Center and ammunition at the Naval Ammunition Depot, Earle, New Jersey, Alstede entered the Bethlehem Steel yard at Staten Island, New York, on 21 January for a regularly scheduled overhaul. She left the yard on 22 March and, after taking on ammunition at Earle, returned to Norfolk on the 24th. The ship spent just over three weeks at the Norfolk Naval Shipyard before getting underway on 15 April for post-overhaul refresher training in the vicinity of Newport, Rhode Island. She again moored at Norfolk on 6 May but remained there only eight days before putting to sea on the 14th. Alstede steamed north to the waters near Argentia, Newfoundland. There, she joined Mazama and Haynsworth in testing underway replenishment equipment. The store ship arrived back in Norfolk on 29 May and began preparations to deploy to the Mediterranean once again.

== Second Med cruise ==
Alstede exited the Chesapeake Bay on 17 June. After 10 days in the Atlantic Ocean the ship transited the Strait of Gibraltar on 27 June and joined the 6th Fleet. For the next two months, she varied underway replenishment missions with visits to such ports as Golfe Juan, France; Barcelona and Valencia, Spain; Phaleron Bay, Greece; and Naples, Italy. The store ship departed the latter port on 28 August on her way back to the United States. She arrived back in Norfolk on 10 September and began a month in port after the cruise to the Mediterranean. On 16 October, she put to sea once more and shaped a course northward. For several days, Alstede participated in antisubmarine warfare exercises in Block Island Sound. She returned to Norfolk on 21 October to undergo repairs at the Norfolk Naval Shipyard. Back at sea on 9 November, the store ship embarked upon a 19-day cruise to the West Indies. During that mission, she tested underway replenishment equipment and made port calls at San Juan, Puerto Rico, and at Guantánamo Bay, Cuba. The vessel arrived back in Norfolk on 28 November and, two weeks later, entered the shipyard of the Norfolk Shipbuilding & Drydock Co. for a month of repairs.

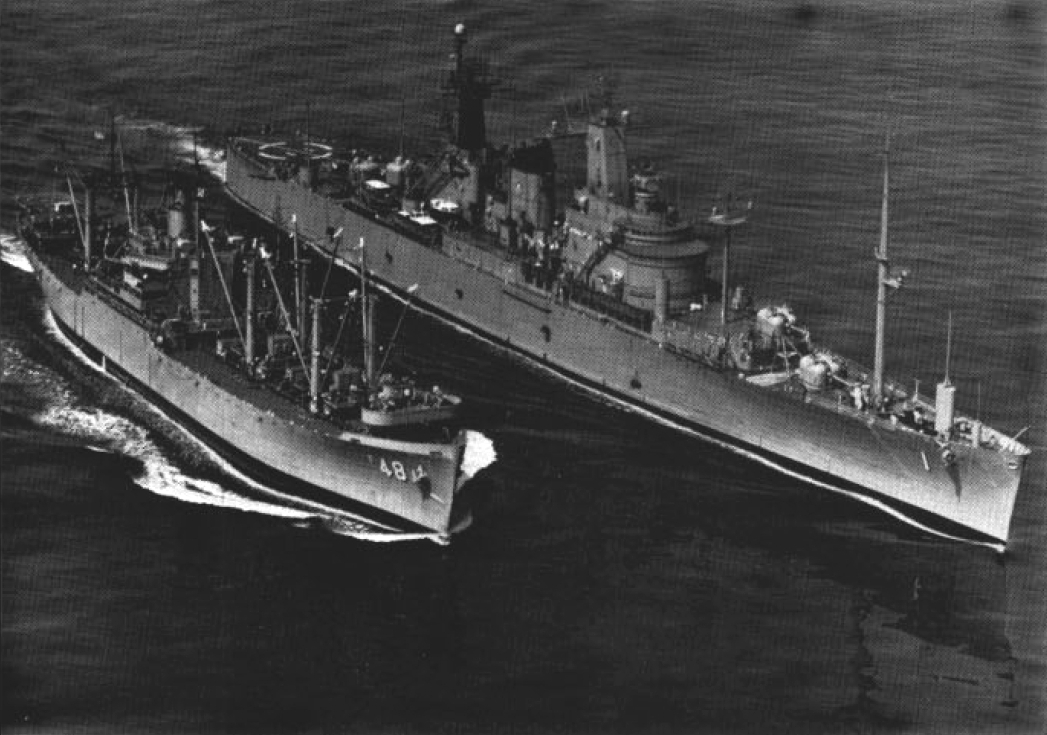
Alstede replenishes USS Northampton, circa in 1964.

== January 1956 Med tour ==
She emerged from the shipyard on 6 January 1956 and headed for the Naval Supply Center, Norfolk, to take on supplies. Alstede operated out of Norfolk for the next two months. On 7 March, she got underway to return to the Mediterranean. After passing through the Strait of Gibraltar on 20 March, the store ship replenished units of the 6th Fleet over the next month and made visits to Cannes, France; Naples, Italy; Cagliari, Sardinia; Tangier, French Morocco; and at the Spanish ports of Barcelona and Valencia. She departed Barcelona on 23 April and shaped a course back to the United States. The ship arrived back in Norfolk on 5 May and began repairs to her hull which had been damaged in a collision while provisioning Croaker in Cannes on 23 March. The repair period lasted until late August, and 18 days of local operations followed. On 14 September, she headed back to the Mediterranean.

== Routine operations ==
At that point, the pattern for the remainder of Alstede's career was established. For the next 13 years, the stores ship deployed to the Mediterranean Sea two or three times a year to resupply units of the U.S. 6th Fleet operating there. When not assigned to that fleet, she engaged in diverse occupations. The ship participated in U.S. 2d Fleet training exercises along the Atlantic coast and in the West Indies as well as conducting independent ship's drills. She entered shipyards periodically to undergo her normal overhauls.

== Awarded the Armed Forces Expeditionary Medal ==
Of special note, the late spring of 1965 brought Alstede the award of the Armed Forces Expeditionary Medal when she provided logistics support for the Navy ships which constituted a portion of the Organization of American States' peacekeeping force sent to the Dominican Republic to mediate the civil strife that had broken out between supporters of the ousted president, Juan Bosch, and forces of the ruling, three-man junta that had supplanted him. Her schedule of Mediterranean resupply missions alternated with 2d Fleet operations and repair periods came to an end on 31 October 1969 when she was decommissioned.

== Decommissioning ==
Her name was struck from the Navy List that same day. Berthed at the Naval Inactive Ship Facility, Norfolk, Virginia, for non-industrial stripping she was sold to N.W. Kennedy, Ltd., of Vancouver, Canada, on 2 June 1970 for scrapping.

== Military awards and honors ==
Alstede earned four battle stars during the Korean War:

- Second Korean Winter
- Korean Defense Summer-Fall 1952
- Third Korean Winter
- Korean Summer-Fall 1953

Alstede's crew was eligible for the following medals:

- National Defense Service Medal
- Korean Service Medal (4)
- Armed Forces Expeditionary Medal (1-Dominican Republic)
- United Nations Service Medal
- Republic of Korea War Service Medal
