= USS Sheridan =

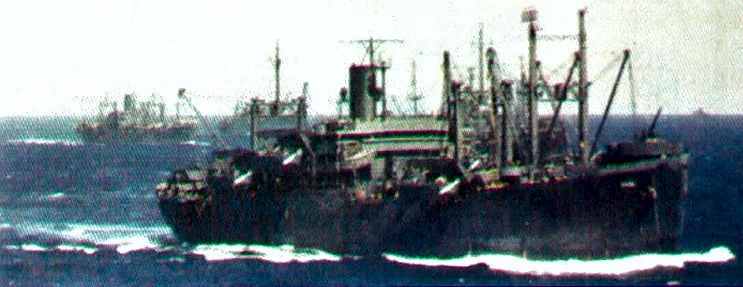
- USS Sheridan (APA-51)

History

United States
- Namesake: Counties named after Civil War General Philip H. Sheridan; Sheridan County, Kansas; Sheridan County, Montana; Sheridan County, Nebraska; Sheridan County, North Dakota; Sheridan County, Wyoming
- Builder: Moore Dry Dock
- Laid down: 5 August 1942
- Launched: 11 November 1942
- Sponsored by: Mrs Thomas Rolph
- Christened: Messenger
- Acquired: 31 July 1943
- Commissioned: 31 July 1943
- Decommissioned: 5 March 1946
- Renamed: USS Sheridan (APA-51), Pioneer Sun, American Scientist
- Reclassified: AP-94 to APA-51, 1 February 1943
- Stricken: 12 April 1946
- Identification: MCV Hull Type C2-S-B1, MCV Hull No. 290
- Honours and awards: Six battle stars for World War II service
- Fate: Scrapped July 1969 after explosion

General characteristics
- Class & type: Ormsby-class attack transport
- Displacement: 7,300 tons (lt), 13,910 t. (fl)
- Length: 459 ft 3 in (139.98 m)
- Beam: 63 ft (19 m)
- Draft: 24 ft (7.3 m)
- Propulsion: 1 × General Electric geared drive turbine, 2 × Foster-Wheeler D-type boilers, 1 × propeller, 6,000 shp (4,500 kW) (designed)
- Speed: 16.5 knots (30.6 km/h)
- Capacity: Troops: 91 Officers, 1,474 Enlisted; Cargo: 150,000 cu ft (4,200 m^{3}), 2,700 long tons (2,700 t)
- Complement: Officers 42, Enlisted 478
- Armament: 2 × 5"/38 caliber DP gun mounts, 2 × Bofors 40 mm gun mounts, 4 × twin 20 mm gun, 12 × 20 mm single gun mounts.

USS Sheridan (APA-51) was an Ormsby-class attack transport that served with the US Navy during World War II.

Sheridan was named after five United States counties which were in turn named after Civil War General Philip H. Sheridan. The ship was laid down on 5 August 1942 under Maritime Commission contract by the Moore Dry Dock Company of Oakland, California, as SS Messenger; renamed Sheridan and designated AP-94 by the Navy on 5 October 1942; launched on 11 November 1942; reclassified APA-51 on 1 February 1943; acquired by the Navy from the Maritime Commission on 31 July 1943; and commissioned the same day.

== World War II ==
Sheridan moved from Oakland to San Francisco on 31 August 1943; and, on 7 September, got underway for shakedown. Returning to San Francisco on 26 September, she loaded cargo and sailed for the western Pacific on 1 October. On 18 October, she delivered cargo at Nouméa; and, on the 25th, she arrived at Wellington, New Zealand, where she embarked marines and their equipment.

=== Invasion of Tarawa ===
Departing New Zealand on 1 November, she underwent amphibious training at Efate Island from the 7th to the 9th and sailed from there on the 13th for the invasion of the Gilbert Islands. Sheridan arrived off Tarawa early in the morning of 20 November 1943 and began debarking troops shortly before noon and cargo in mid-afternoon. The next day, she began reembarking troops, boats, and casualties. Sailing on 24 November, she arrived on 2 December at Pearl Harbor, where she discharged her casualties and was inspected by Fleet Admiral Chester Nimitz.

On 5 December, she disembarked cargo and marines at Hilo, T.H., and then proceeded to the west coast, arriving at San Diego on 13 December.

=== Invasion of Kwajalein ===
Sheridan participated in practice landings at Oceanside, California, from 15 to 17 December 1943, and then welcomed the new year, 1944, with more exercises at San Clemente from 1 to 5 January. She then received her combat loadout of troops and supplies and sailed from San Diego on 13 January.

Stopping at Maui, T.H., just long enough to fuel, she arrived off the beaches of Kwajalein Atoll on 31 January. Her troops participated in the landings at Roi on 1 February while Sheridan remained off the beaches offloading cargo and acting as a temporary hospital ship pending the arrival of hospital ship USS Solace (AH-5). The transport sailed on 8 February, offloaded troops and cargo at Maui on 16 February, and then moved to Pearl Harbor on 17 February to receive needed repairs.

=== Invasion of Saipan ===
On 28 February, Sheridan began an intensive period of amphibious training at Maui, which lasted, with two short breaks, until 19 May. On 30 May, she sailed from Pearl Harbor with a task force bound for the Marianas. Arriving at Eniwetok on 9 June, Sheridan transferred troops to assigned LSTs and sailed on 11 June for Saipan.

Arriving on 15 June, she debarked troops and cargo; and then embarked a large group of casualties on the 18th. She completed offloading cargo on 20 June and sailed from Saipan the following day. After picking up more casualties at Eniwetok on 25 and 26 June, she arrived at Pearl Harbor on 3 July.

=== Invasion of Guam ===
Sheridan embarked Army troops there on 4 July and sailed on the 9th. Touching at Eniwetok on the 17th, she arrived at Guam on the 22nd, a day after the initial landings, and debarked her troops the following day. The ship departed Guam on 28 July, touched at Eniwetok on 1 August, and arrived at Pearl Harbor on the 10th. There, she received repairs, and then embarked Army troops and equipment for the reconquest of the Philippines.

=== Invasion of Leyte ===
After a week of amphibious training at Maui from 1 to 7 September, Sheridan departed Pearl Harbor on the 15th, and, after stops at Eniwetok and Manus, arrived on 20 October in the transport area off Leyte where she put her troops ashore in the first waves. Completing general unloading on the 22nd, she sailed for Humboldt Bay the same day. After remaining there from 27 October to 5 November, she arrived at Noemfoor Island on the 7th to load Army Air Force personnel and equipment, which she delivered at Leyte on the 18th.

=== Invasion of the Philippines ===
Arriving at Manus on the 24th, Sheridan sailed on the 28th for Torokina, Bougainville Island, where she arrived on 1 December. There, she combat-loaded Army troops; and then underwent extensive training in amphibious operations, moving to Huon Gulf, New Guinea for the final rehearsal on the 19th. Returning to Manus on the 21st, she sailed on 31 December 1944 as part of an assault group bound for Lingayen Gulf.

The force encountered heavy air opposition during the approach on 8 January 1945, but Sheridan arrived unscathed and landed her troops early the next day. She then took on board 108 Navy casualties and survivors mainly from the escort carrier USS Ommaney Bay (CVE-79), and sailed the same day for Leyte, arriving on the 12th. There, she embarked troops, and, after a landing rehearsal on 25 January, put them ashore on the 29th at La Paz, Philippine Islands, which turned out to be under the control of friendly guerrillas. The transport anchored in San Pedro, P.I., on 1 February and remained there until late March while the war moved closer to the Japanese homeland.

=== Invasion of Okinawa ===
On 14 March 1945, Sheridan loaded troops for her final assault landing, the one on Okinawa. After training in the Philippines, the transport sailed with an assault force on 27 March and put her troops ashore in the first waves at Okinawa on 1 April.

=== Repairs and training ===
Departing Okinawa on the 5th, she touched at Guam and Pearl Harbor and then arrived at San Francisco on 29 April for a major overhaul. Repairs were carried out between 4 May and 26 June by the United Engineering Co., San Francisco. Sheridan then proceeded to San Diego on 1 July for refresher training in amphibious operations, returning to San Francisco on the 12th. Sailing three days later, she delivered her passengers at Samar, P.I., on 6 August after stops at Eniwetok, Ulithi, and Leyte.

== After hostilities ==
Sheridan loaded troops at Zamboanga, P.I., on 15 and 16 August, but due to the end of the war, debarked them at Tacloban on the 18th. Arriving at Batangas, P.I., three days later, she loaded troops for the occupation of Japan and sailed for Japan on the 25th.

The ship entered Tokyo Bay as the surrender document was being signed on board battleship USS Missouri (BB-63), and offloaded her troops on 3 September. Sailing on the next day, Sheridan arrived at Okinawa on the 7th; and, after riding out a typhoon at sea, between 16 and 18 September, she embarked troops and sailed on 26 September for Taku, China. She remained at Taku from 30 September to 6 October and then sailed to the Philippines to embark a marine air group which she delivered at Taku on 14 November.

=== Operation Magic Carpet ===
Assigned next to Operation Magic Carpet, she sailed on 28 November from Taku; embarked marine troops at Sasebo, Japan; and sailed from there on 7 December for the United States.

Arriving at San Diego on the 23d, she commenced a period of overhaul; but, on 7 January 1946, she was released from Magic Carpet duty and designated for disposal.

== Decommission ==
She sailed from San Diego on 11 January and arrived at Mobile, Alabama, on 1 February for deactivation. Sheridan was decommissioned on 5 March 1946, delivered to the Maritime Commission on 7 April 1946, and struck from the Navy List on 12 April 1946.

== Awards ==
Sheridan received six battle stars for her World War II service.

== Commercial service ==
Sold by the Maritime Commission to the United States Lines on 24 October 1947, she was briefly named Pioneer Sun and then served as American Scientist from 1947 until damaged by an explosion in July 1969 and scrapped.
