= USNS Bald Eagle =

Cargo ship of the United States Navy

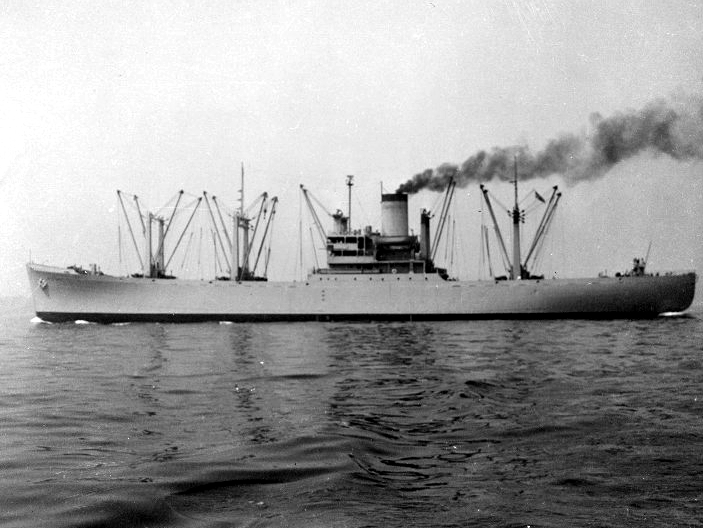

History

United States
- Name: Bald Eagle
- Owner: U.S. Maritime Commission
- Operator: War Shipping Administration (by agents) (1943—1948); U.S. Army (1948—1950); Military Sea Transportation Service (1950—1970)
- Builder: Moore Dry Dock, Oakland, Ca.
- Yard number: 217
- Launched: 7 May 1942
- Completed: Delivered: 28 May 1943
- In service: as USNS Bald Eagle (T-AF-50)
- Out of service: 1970
- Identification: U.S. Official Number: 243368
- Fate: Scrapped in 1973

General characteristics
- Tonnage: 6,178 GRT, 3,474 NRT, 8,371 DWT
- Displacement: 6,556 t.(lt) 13,893 t.(fl)
- Length: 459 ft 2 in (139.95 m)
- Beam: 63 ft (19 m)
- Draught: 25 ft 9 in (7.85 m)
- Propulsion: cross-compound turbines, single propeller
- Speed: 15.5 kts.
- Capacity: 323,309 cu ft (9,155.1 m^{3}) refrigerated cargo
- Crew: 55
- Armament: none

USNS Bald Eagle (T-AF-50) was a Maritime Commission type C2-S-B1 cargo ship delivered to the War Shipping Administration (WSA) in May 1943. The ship was operated by WSA agent shipping companies until July 1948 when laid up in the James River Reserve Fleet briefly before beginning operation for the U.S. Army in October. When the Navy's Military Sea Transportation Service (MSTS) took over all military ocean shipping in 1950 the ship was transferred to operate as one of six refrigerated cargo ships in the MSTS fleet until July 1970 as USNS Bald Eagle. The ship was permanently transferred to Maritime Commission custody in September 1971 and sold for scrap in 1973.

== History ==
Bald Eagle was built as a Maritime Commission type C2-S-B1 hull number 217, under Maritime Commission contract 186 at Moore Dry Dock Company, Oakland, California. She was delivered to the War Shipping Administration, 28 May 1943 and given the U.S. Official Number 243368. From delivery until 9 September 1946 United States Lines operated the ship as the WSA agent. On that date Pacific Far East Lines operated the ship under bareboat charter until 2 May 1947. From then several companies acted as agents until the ship entered the Reserve Fleet 30 July 1948.

On 4 October the ship was turned over to the U.S. Army under bareboat charter to operate as an Army transport. In 1950, with the organization of the Department of Defense, all such transport was transferred to the Military Sea Transportation Service. Bald Eagle was transferred on 1 March 1950 to operate as one of MSTS' six refrigerated cargo ships with the designation T-AF-50. The ship had a crew of 55 and had 323,309 cu ft (9,155.1 m^{3}) of chill/freeze cargo capacity making regular runs between the United States east coast and northern Europe.

On 16 July 1970 Bald Eagle was taken out of service and transferred to Maritime Commission custody with permanent transfer on 1 September. On 1 March 1973 the hull was sold to Andy International, Inc. for $75,666.66 and physically delivered from the James River Reserve Fleet for scrapping 1 June.

== Military awards and honors ==
Bald Eagle's crew was eligible for the following medals:

- National Defense Service Medal
