= Labor Relations Reference Manual =

Labor Relations Reference Manual (LRRM) is an American case reporter devoted exclusively to labor law published by the Bureau of National Affairs (BNA). It is published 3 times a year and includes decisions of federal and some state courts, the National Labor Relations Board (NLRB), state agencies, and other material of reference value. It is one part of the Labor Relations Reporter service (weekly/biweekly) and has been published since 1937.

Example of legal citation:

- Moore Dry Dock Standards for Primary Picketing at a Secondary Site (Sailors Union of the Pacific (Moore Dry Dock Co.), 92 NLRB 547, 27 LRRM 1108 (1950))
