= USS Pictor (AF-54) =

Cargo ship of the United States Navy

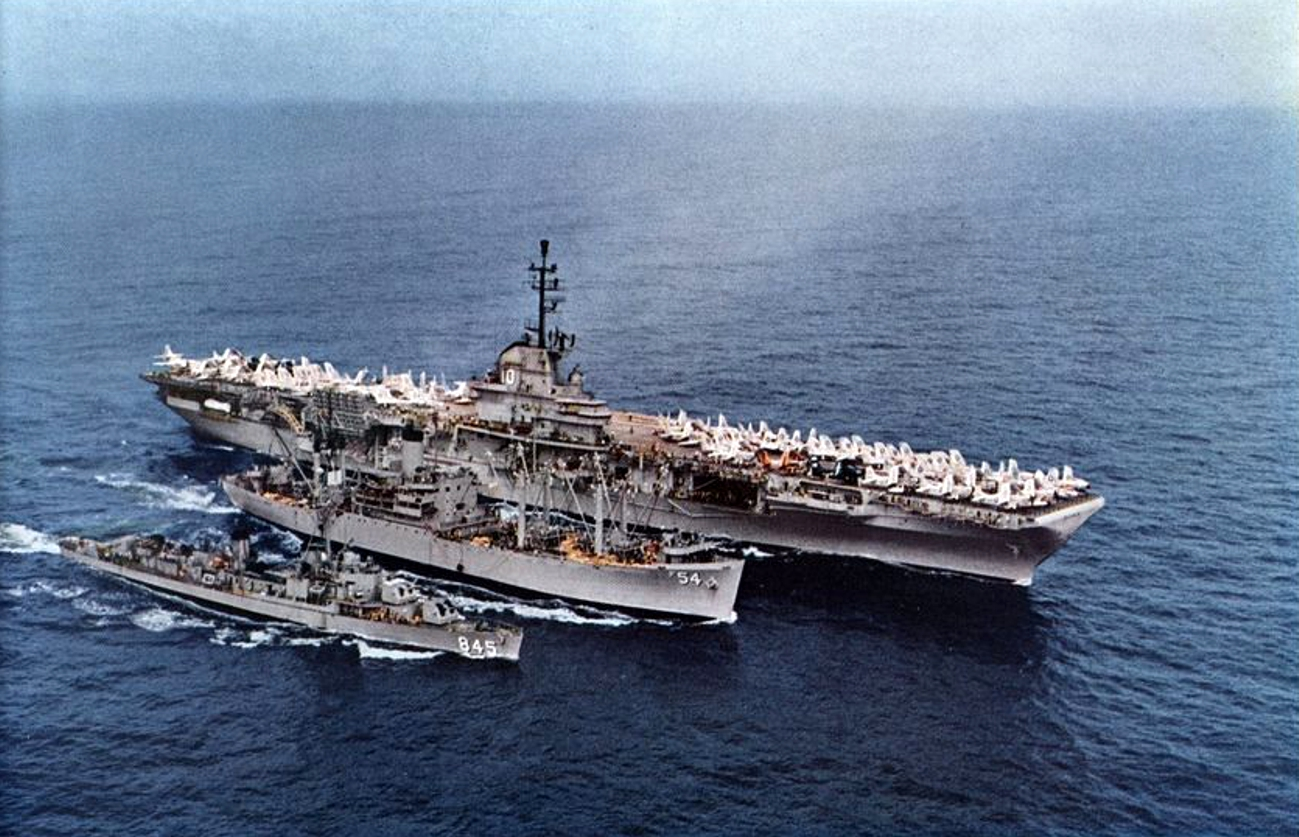
- Pictor replenishing Yorktown and Bausell, 1957

History

United States
- Ordered: as SS Great Republic; C2-S-B1 hull, MC hull 187
- Laid down: 18 March 1942
- Launched: 4 June 1942
- Acquired: 13 September 1950
- Commissioned: 13 September 1950
- Decommissioned: December 1969
- Stricken: 1 June 1976
- Fate: Sold, 25 November 1981, Scrapped, Kaohsiung 1986-1987

General characteristics
- Displacement: 15,500 tons(fl)
- Length: 459 ft 2 in (139.95 m)
- Beam: 63 ft (19 m)
- Draught: 28 ft (8.5 m)
- Propulsion: cross-compound turbines, single propeller
- Speed: 16 kts.
- Complement: 292

USS Pictor (AF-54) was an Alstede-class stores ship in service with the United States Navy from 1950 to 1969. She was scrapped in 1986.

== History ==
Pictor was laid down under a Maritime Commission contract as SS Great Republic (MC–187) 18 March 1942 by the Moore Dry Dock Company, Oakland, California; She was launched 4 June 1942, sponsored by Mrs. William Craig Jr.. During outfitting, refrigeration was added to all five holds and she was reclassified as a C2-S-B1(R) type ship and was delivered 29 June 1943.

=== Commercial service (1943–1950) ===
From 29 June 1943 until April 1950, she served as SS Great Republic for various private companies, including United Fruit Co., and Pacific Far East Lines of San Francisco, California. Great Republic was responsible for bringing 1,600 tons of turkey to the soldiers serving in France for Thanksgiving 1944. In April 1950, she was returned to the Maritime Commission and was moored in an inactive status in Suisun Bay, California.

=== U.S. Navy (1950–1981) ===
In September 1950, the Navy acquired this merchant ship from the Maritime Administration for conversion into a store ship. Pictor commissioned 13 September 1950, and reported for duty to the U.S. Pacific Fleet.

During the Korean War, she made tours of the Far East to supply perishable foods and dry stores to personnel in Korea and on the Taiwan patrol.

After the Korean War, she continued to store refrigerate, transport, and issue, underway and in port, perishable foods and dry stores for the U.S. 1st Fleet and the U.S. 7th Fleet off the U.S. West Coast and in the western Pacific Ocean.

During the Vietnam War, she supplied food and dry goods to the 7th Fleet on station off Vietnam.

She decommissioned in December 1969 and was returned to MARAD in August 1970 for lay up in the National Defense Reserve Fleet. She was struck from the Naval Register, 1 June 1976. She was sold on 25 November 1981 to Levine Metals Corp., moored in Richmond, California (USA). The ship was finally sold to Shiong Yek Steel Corporation for scrapping in Taiwan on 29 September 1986 with ex-USS Procyon (AF-61) and USS Zelima (AF-49). All three ships were scrapped at Kaohsiung between December 1986 and 16 June 1987.

== Military awards and honors ==
Pictor received one battle star during the Korean War:

- Korea, Summer-Fall 1953 Campaign

She received eight campaign stars during the Vietnam War:

- Vietnam Defense
- Vietnamese Counteroffensive
- Vietnam Counteroffensive - Phase II
- Vietnam Counteroffensive - Phase III
- Vietnam Counteroffensive - Phase IV
- Vietnam Counteroffensive - Phase V
- Tet/69 Counteroffensive
- Vietnam Summer-Fall 1969

Her crew was eligible for the following medals:

- National Defense Service Medal
- Korean Service Medal (1)
- Armed Forces Expeditionary Medal (six- 1-Taiwan Straits, 1-Quemoy-Matsu, 4-Vietnam)
- Vietnam Service Medal (8)
- United Nations Service Medal
- Republic of Vietnam Campaign Medal
- Republic of Korea War Service Medal (retroactive)
