= USC&GS Yukon =

USC&GS Yukon was the name of more than one United States Coast Survey or United States Coast and Geodetic Survey ship, and may refer to:

- USC&GS Yukon (1873), a schooner in service as a survey ship in the Coast Survey from 1873 to 1878 and in the Coast and Geodetic Survey from 1878 to 1894
- USC&GS Yukon (1898), a steamer in service as a survey ship in the Coast and Geodetic Survey from 1898 to 1923
