= USS Zelima =

Cargo ship of the United States Navy

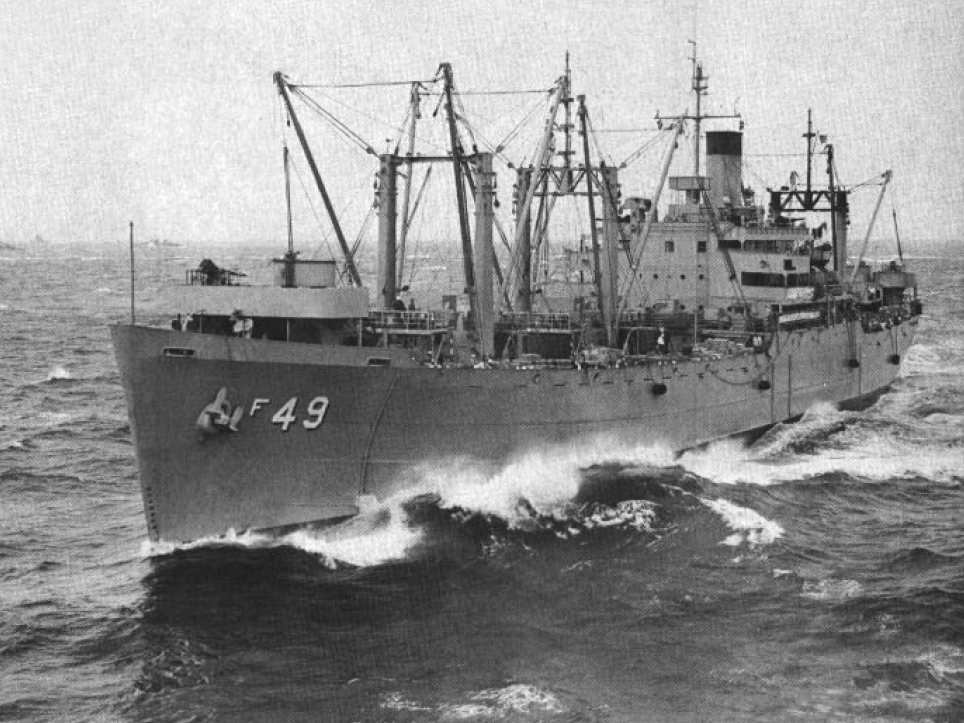
- USS Zelima underway, circa 1963

History

United States
- Ordered: as Golden Rocket; R2-S-BV1 hull, MC hull 1212
- Laid down: 5 December 1944
- Launched: 2 March 1945
- Acquired: summer 1946
- Commissioned: 27 July 1946
- Decommissioned: September 1969
- Stricken: 1 June 1976
- Fate: disposed of by MARAD sale, fate unknown

General characteristics
- Class & type: Alstede-class stores ship
- Displacement: 15,500 t (fl)
- Length: 459 ft 2 in (139.95 m)
- Beam: 63 ft (19 m)
- Draught: 28 ft (8.5 m)
- Propulsion: cross-compound turbines, single propeller
- Speed: 16 kn (30 km/h) cruising
- Range: 16,000 nmi (30,000 km)
- Complement: 292
- Armament: 2 twin 40 mm guns

USS Zelima (AF-49) was an Alstedes-class stores ship acquired by the United States Navy at the end of World War II. Her task was to carry stores, refrigerated items, and equipment to ships in the fleet, and to remote stations and staging areas.

Zelima was laid down on 5 December 1944 at Oakland, California, by the Moore Dry Dock Company under Maritime Commission contract (MC hull 1212) as Golden Rocket; launched on 2 March 1945; sponsored by Mrs. J. W. Greenslade; and delivered to the War Shipping Administration on 16 July 1945. She was operated by the United Fruit Co. under a contract with the War Shipping Administration for almost a year. Turned over to the Navy in the summer of 1946, she was renamed Zelima; converted to a stores ship at the Mare Island Naval Shipyard; and commissioned on 27 July 1946.

== Pacific Ocean assignment ==
With her home port at San Francisco, California, Zelima spent her first four years of active service carrying provisions and other supplies from the U.S. West Coast to Japan and other points in the Pacific occupied by American forces. On the return voyages, she often carried servicemen returning home after service in the Far East.

== Korean War operations ==
The eruption of hostilities in Korea during the summer of 1950 brought an increase in workload for all ships in the Pacific Fleet Service Force, and Zelima was no exception. She saw constant duty in the combat zone carrying thousands of tons of food and other supplies to the ships of the U.S. 7th Fleet operating off the Korean coast as well as to U.S. Army and United States Marine Corps units ashore and to Air Force squadrons flying daily sorties from the islands surrounding the Korean peninsula.

== Post-Korean War activity ==
With the winding down of the Korean War in 1953, Zelima resumed her peacetime chores of supplying the American bases spread throughout the Pacific Ocean. However, periodic crises brought her back into potentially dangerous situations. During the waning months of 1958—when the Chinese communists brought their guns to bear on the Nationalist Chinese-held, offshore islands, Quemoy and Matsu -- Zelima replenished units of the 7th Fleet patrolling the Taiwan Strait and delivered badly needed supplies to Americans stationed on Taiwan itself. Later, in the fall of 1961, she operated off the coast of Vietnam servicing fleet units sent there as a result of an intensification of guerrilla activity in that strife-torn land.

== Cuban crisis support ==
In October 1962 she sailed from San Diego to the Panama Canal for five days while she replenished ships headed toward the Panama Canal on their way to join the "quarantine" of Cuba imposed by President John F. Kennedy in his successful gesture to secure the removal of Russian missiles from that island.

== Vietnam operations ==
The spring of 1963 saw her return to the Far East and, more specifically, to the waters off Vietnam. Following that visit in April and May, she resumed her normal routine for about 16 months. After the Gulf of Tonkin incident spurred an even more rapid acceleration in American involvement, Zelima's visits to Vietnamese waters became more regularized and frequent. By the latter 1960's, she made two, sometimes as many as three or four, replenishment visits per year to the ports and coastal waters of Vietnam bringing supplies to both ships at sea and men ashore.

The Vietnam War dominated the remainder of her career, for she went out of service almost three years before the conflict ended early in 1973. Her last tour of duty off the Vietnamese coast came in May and June 1969.

== Decommissioning ==
Zelima was decommissioned at the Mare Island Naval Shipyard in September 1969. She was turned over to the Maritime Administration for berthing in its National Defense Reserve Fleet group at Suisun Bay, California, in June 1970. Her name was struck from the Navy List near the end of 1976, and ownership of the ship was transferred to the Maritime Administration. As of January 1979, she remained in the custody of the Maritime Administration. Final Disposition: she was disposed of by MARAD sale, fate unknown.

== Military awards and honors ==
Zelima earned one battle star during the Korean War:

- First UN Counter Offensive

She was awarded six battle stars for Vietnamese service. Five are recorded:

- Vietnam Defense Campaign
- Vietnam Counteroffensive
- Vietnam Counteroffensive - Phase V
- Vietnam Counteroffensive - Phase VI
- Tet 69/ Counteroffensive

Her crew was eligible for the following medals:

- National Defense Service Medal (2)
- Korean Service Medal (1)
- Armed Forces Service Medal (3-Korea, 10-Quemoy-Matsu, 6-Vietnam){This award not authorized for any U.S. military personnel before June 1, 1992} (not retroactive)
- Vietnam Service Medal (5)
- United Nations Service Medal
- Republic of Vietnam Campaign Medal
- Republic of Korea War Service Medal (retroactive)
