= USS Yukon =

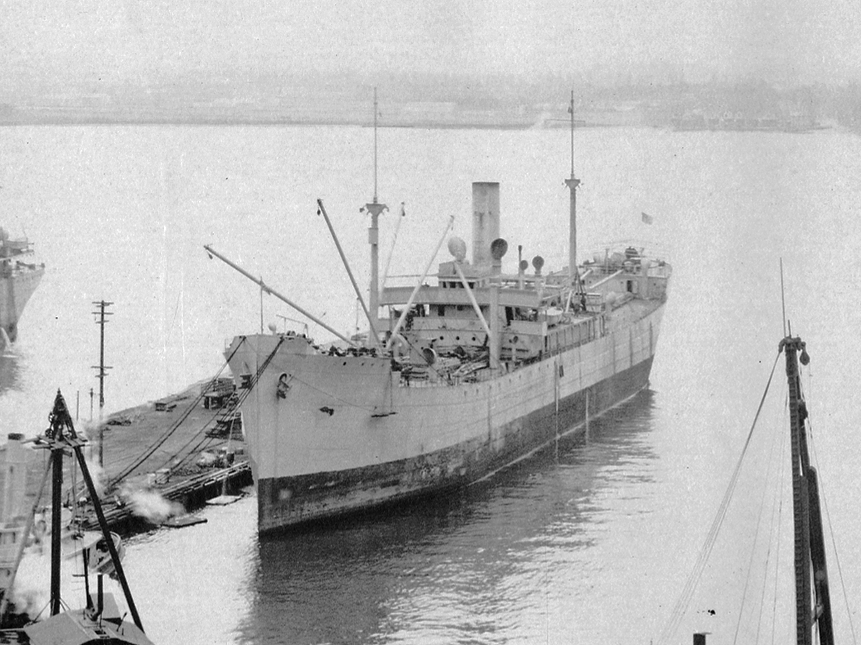
- USS Yukon, c. 1921

History

United States
- Name: USS Yukon
- Namesake: Yukon River in Alaska
- Builder: Moore Shipbuilding Company, Oakland, California
- Laid down: 1920, as SS Mehanno
- Acquired: 14 November 1921
- Commissioned: 6 December 1921, as USS Yukon (AF-9)
- Decommissioned: 14 April 1922
- Recommissioned: 19 January 1940
- Decommissioned: 18 March 1946
- Stricken: 17 April 1946
- Fate: Sold for scrapping, 29 July 1946

General characteristics
- Class & type: Arctic-class store ship
- Displacement: 12,546 long tons (12,747 t) full load
- Length: 416 ft 10 in (127.05 m)
- Beam: 53 ft 10 in (16.41 m)
- Draft: 25 ft 9 in (7.85 m)
- Installed power: 2,800 shp (2,100 kW)
- Propulsion: 1 × geared turbine; 1 × shaft
- Speed: 12.3 kn (14.2 mph; 22.8 km/h)
- Capacity: 5,280 long tons (5,360 t)
- Complement: 229 officers and enlisted
- Armament: 1 × 5 in (130 mm)/51 cal gun, 4 × 3 in (76 mm)/50 cal dual purpose guns, 8 × 20 mm anti-aircraft cannon

USS Yukon (AF-9) was an Arctic-class stores ship in service with the United States Navy from 1921 to 1922 and from 1940 to 1946. She was scrapped in 1947.

== History ==
The first Navy ship to be so named, Yukon was a steamer constructed in 1920 as SS Mehanno by the Moore Shipbuilding Company at Oakland, California, for the United States Shipping Board and was acquired by the Navy on 14 November 1921. She was renamed Yukon, converted to a stores ship, designated AF-9, and commissioned on 6 December 1921.

=== Inter-war service ===
Yukon served briefly as a unit of the Train, Pacific Fleet; however, on 14 April 1922, she was decommissioned and placed in reserve at Philadelphia, Pennsylvania. She remained there until late 1939, when she was moved to New York City for a partial conversion and preparations for her return to active service. Yukon was recommissioned at Brooklyn, New York on 19 January 1940.

=== World War II ===
==== North Atlantic operations ====
Following shakedown, Yukon was assigned to the Service Force Atlantic Fleet. During the first two years of her resumed service, the ship made 13 round-trip voyages between the United States and the West Indies. In December 1941, however, her zone of operations was changed to the North Atlantic, and she made a voyage to Reykjavík, Iceland. While returning to the United States from Iceland on 23 January 1942, Yukon suffered partial disability when her main air compressor went out. Two days later, Hamilton came to her aid and took the ship in tow for Reykjavík. On the 29th, Hamilton turned her charge over to the British tug HMS Frisky and took up escort station.

==== Attacked by U-boat ====
About an hour later, a torpedo struck the Coast Guard cutter, and Yukon went to general quarters. About 30 minutes after that, the enemy submarine attacked Yukon; but her torpedo missed its mark, passing some 250 yd (230 m) astern. The cutter remained afloat for about a day before being sunk by American gunfire. Yukon arrived safely at Reykjavík, where she completed repairs before heading back to the United States. The ship resumed her voyages between the United States and American bases in the Atlantic, visiting such diverse places as Bermuda, Nova Scotia, Iceland, Trinidad, and Newfoundland.

==== Collision on the high seas ====
On 23 July 1943, while steaming in convoy a few hours out of Sydney, Nova Scotia, SS El Mirlo struck Yukon, damaging her portside considerably. Nevertheless, the stores ship succeeded in keeping up with the convoy and safely made Argentia, Newfoundland. She made temporary repairs at Argentia, returned to the United States at Boston, Massachusetts on 5 August, and began permanent repairs.

==== Supporting Mediterranean operations ====
Yukon returned to active service in the fall of 1943. Between that time and the summer of 1944, she made four voyages, all to either Bermuda or the West Indies. In July, her itinerary changed. She departed New York on the 11th and anchored in Hampton Roads the following evening. On the morning of 14 July, she passed between Capes Charles and Henry with a 120-ship convoy, UGS 48, bound for the Mediterranean Sea.

Upon entering the Mediterranean, Yukon and two men-of-war, a destroyer and a destroyer escort, parted company with the convoy and set course for Oran, Algeria. She arrived in the North African port on 30 July, discharged some fresh provisions, and took on some cargo bound for Naples, Italy. The following day, the stores ship stood out of Oran and headed for the Italian peninsula. She arrived in Naples on 3 August but the following morning received orders to move immediately to Castellamare Bay to provision the fleet preparing for the invasion of southern France. Yukon left the Naples, Italy, area on 5 August and set a course via Palermo on the southern coast of Sicily for Bizerte in Tunisia. The ship entered the North African port on 8 August and, the following day, sailed with a westbound convoy, GUS-48. On 28 August, after crossing half the Mediterranean and the entire Atlantic, she entered port at Boston, Massachusetts.

==== Navigating the North Atlantic seas ====
After upkeep at Boston, she put to sea on 5 September to carry supplies to an Army base located at Ikateg Fjord, Greenland. Steaming via Argentia in Newfoundland and Angmagssalik on the eastern coast of Greenland, she made one false start and then, on her second attempt, successfully navigated Angmagssalik, Ikerrasak, and Ikateg fjords to arrive at the Army airstrip. She began unloading her cargo, an operation made doubly hazardous by large quantities of floating ice. In spite of the danger, Yukon's crew completed the unloading successfully, allowing the ship to leave before the imminent closing of the fjord by ice. She continued her voyage east, bound for Reykjavík, Iceland.

==== Under attack by German torpedoes ====
On the afternoon of 22 September, she steamed into the swept channel in the approaches to Reykjavík in company with destroyer Babbitt. At about 15:51, she recorded an underwater shock of undetermined origin and reported it to her escort. As Babbitt began searching the area, Yukon registered another underwater shock of lesser intensity and went to general quarters. Two minutes later at 15:52, lookouts observed a torpedo pass astern of the ship and explode about 1,500 yd (1,400 m) to her portside. The stores ship began making emergency turns to evade the enemy torpedoes; but, at 15:57, one struck her on the starboard side about 50 ft (15 m) from the stem. U-979, commanded by Kptlt Johannes Meermeier, was credited with damaging her.

The ship made an emergency turn to starboard and rang up full speed, just in case circumstances forced her to beach. Down by the bow, Yukon transferred fuel oil aft and pumped about 60,000 US gal (230,000 L) more overboard to correct the problem. Far more serious, her entire bow was blown open from the stem aft to some 60 ft (18 m), the outer shell of her double bottom was ruptured to port and starboard, and a dangerous crack appeared across the vessel amidships. Such was her condition when she began limping back to Reykjavík that many on board doubted her ability to make it the short distance into the Icelandic port.

At 18:08, after about two hours steaming at barely three knots, Yukon met two tugs sent out from Reykjavík in response to her SOS. She took on board the pilot she had requested and, with the aid of the tugs, moved into the port. Circumstances, however, forced her to ground on the soft mud inshore until the following day when the ship moved into her designated berth.

==== Repairing torpedo damage ====
Yukon completed temporary repairs at Reykjavík and then got underway in company with destroyer escort USS O'Toole (DE-527) and tug Abnaki. After nine days at sea, Yukon put into Argentia, Newfoundland to weather a severe storm. The storm passed, and the ship resumed her voyage to Norfolk, Virginia, where she arrived on 5 December. She immediately entered the Norfolk Navy Yard and began permanent repairs.

She returned to sea in mid-February 1945 and voyaged to New York where she loaded cargo for the West Indies. She stood out of New York on 18 February, steamed by way of Bermuda to San Juan, Puerto Rico, and returned to Norfolk on 7 March.

=== Transfer to the Pacific Fleet ===
Eight days later, the ship passed between Cape Charles and Cape Henry out into the Atlantic on her way to the Pacific. She transited the Panama Canal and continued on to Pearl Harbor. From there, she resumed her voyage west and on 5 May entered the lagoon at Ulithi. Following a 12-day layover, during which she unloaded her cargo, Yukon departed Ulithi on the 17th and set a course for the southwestern Pacific. She made an overnight stop at Manus on the 21st and 22d and arrived in Auckland, New Zealand on 4 June. On the 12th, Yukon stood out of Auckland and laid a course for Hawaii, arriving in Pearl Harbor on the 28th.

==== End-of-war activity ====
The store ship unloaded her cargo at Pearl, took on a partial one bound for the South Pacific, and got underway again on 8 July. After stops at Espiritu Santo and Nouméa, the ship arrived back in Auckland, New Zealand, at the end of the month. Yukon departed Auckland on 11 August; and, while the ship steamed toward Hawaii, Japan capitulated. She arrived in Pearl Harbor on the 27th and, after a three-week layover in Hawaii, headed back to the southwestern Pacific, where she made a stop each at Manus and at Samar.

Departing Samar on 4 November, she steamed back to Pearl Harbor where she stopped for over a month before continuing on to the Panama Canal. She transited the canal sometime between 21 and 24 January 1946 and departed the Panama Canal Zone on the latter day. Yukon arrived in Norfolk on the last day of January and began preparations for inactivation.

=== Decommissioning ===
She was decommissioned at Norfolk on 18 March 1946. Her name was struck from the Naval Vessel Register on 17 April, and she was turned over to the Maritime Commission for custody pending disposal on 1 July. On 29 July, she was sold to the Boston Metals Co. of Baltimore, Maryland for scrapping.
