= Naval Base Ulithi =

Major World War 2 base in Caroline Islands

Coordinates: 9.97°N 139.67°E

Naval Base Ulithi Caroline Islands

Establishment
  - US Navy Base: 1944
- Time zone: UTC+10 and +11

Location of Naval Base Ulithi in the Pacific Ocean

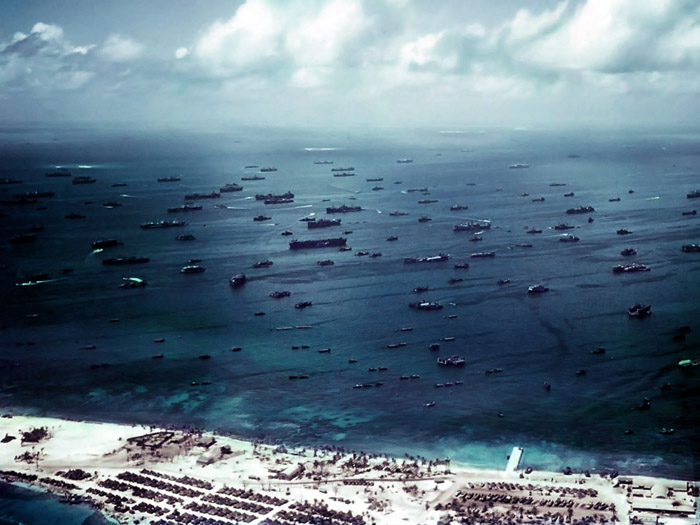
Naval Base Ulithi's Sorlen Island and the north anchorage of Ulithi Atoll in late 1944

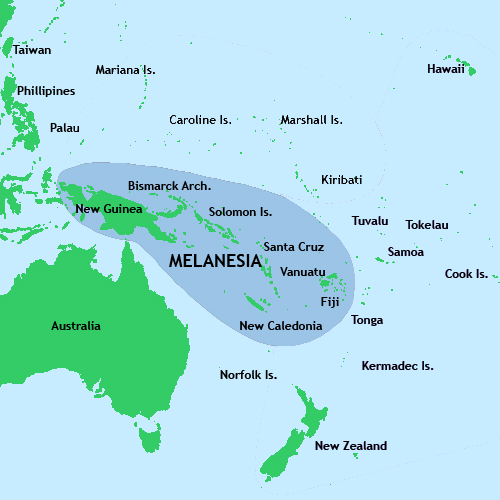
Naval Base Ulithi in the Caroline Islands, north of the Melanesia Islands

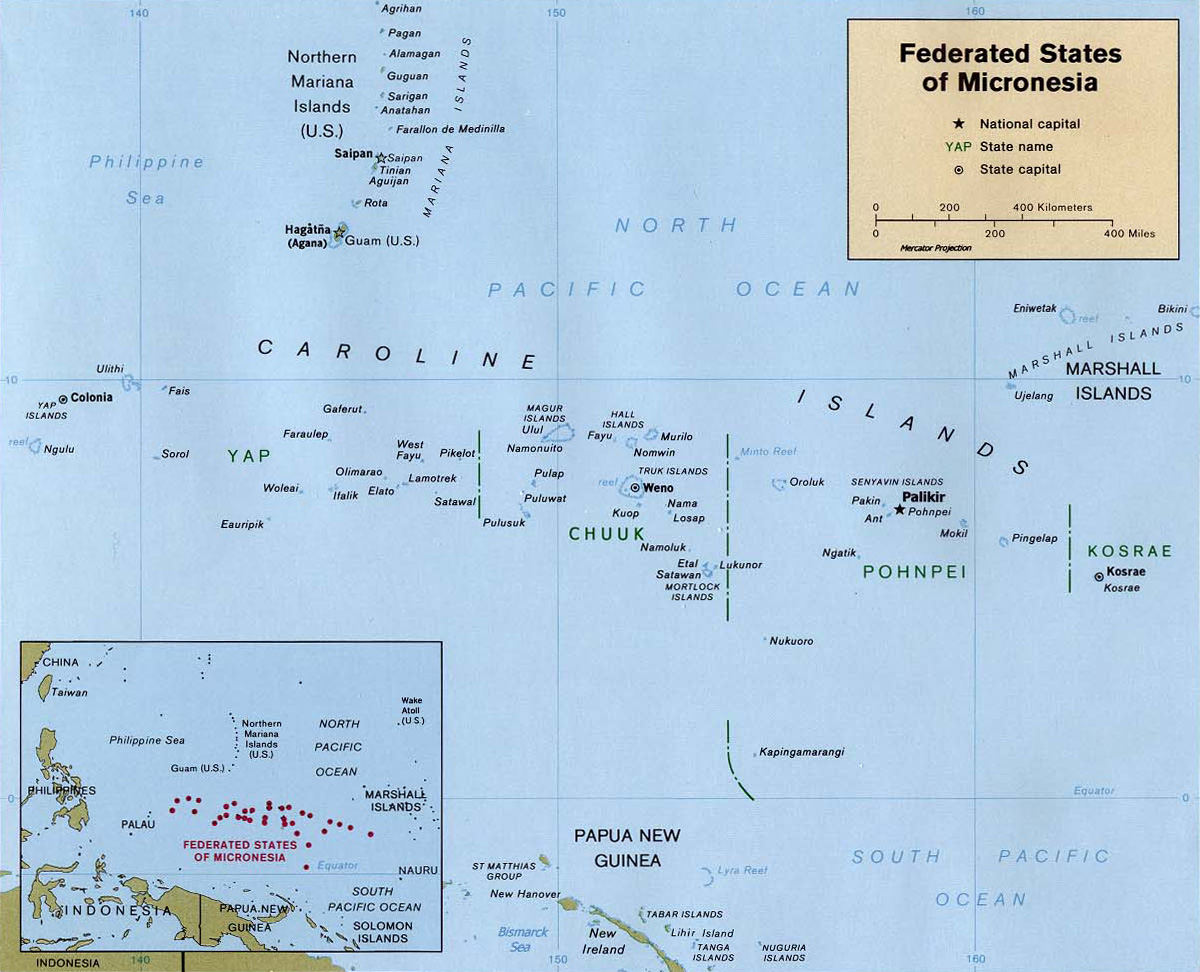
A map of the Federated States of Micronesia

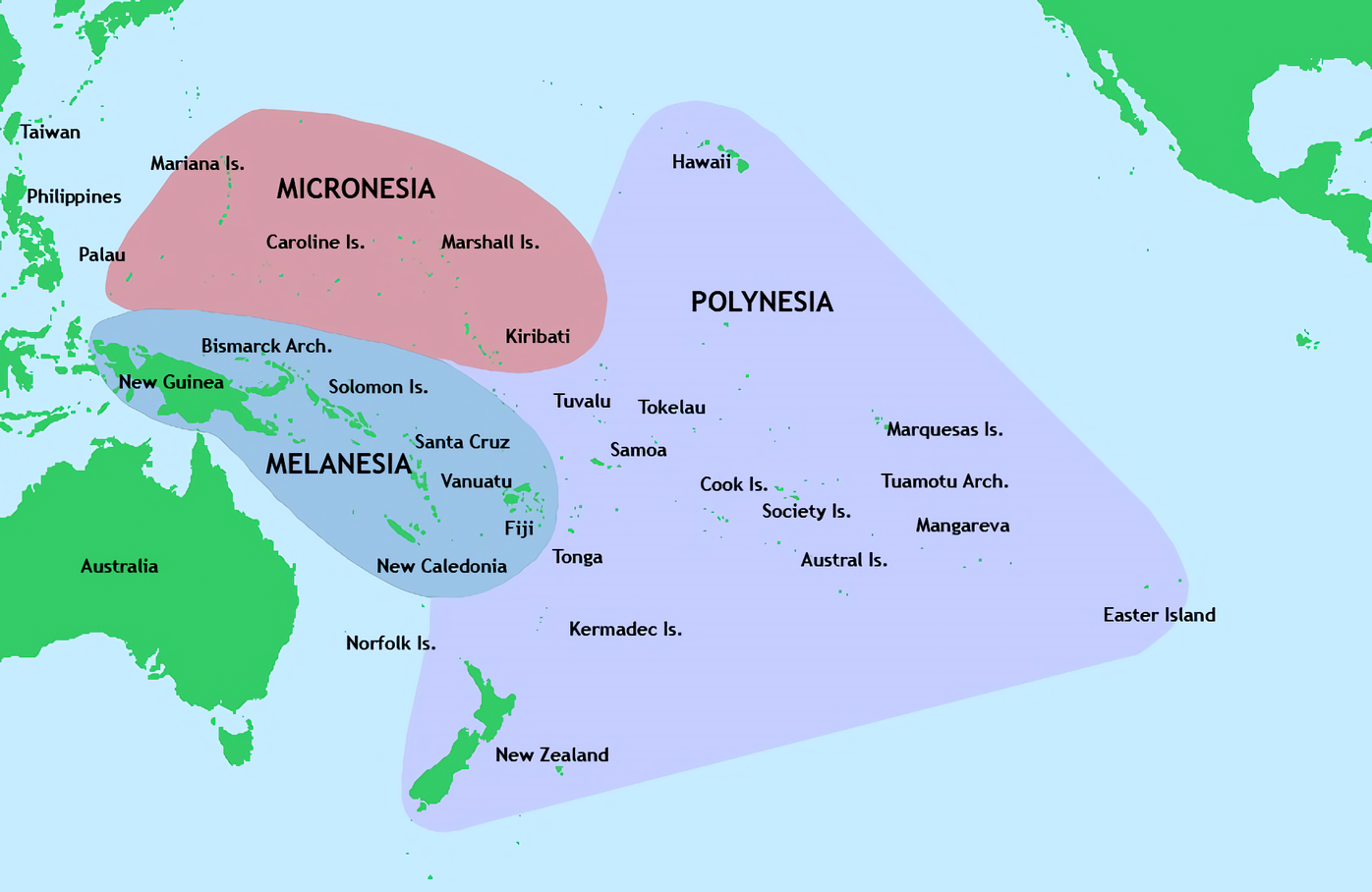
Micronesia is one of three major areas in the Pacific Ocean, along with Polynesia and Melanesia

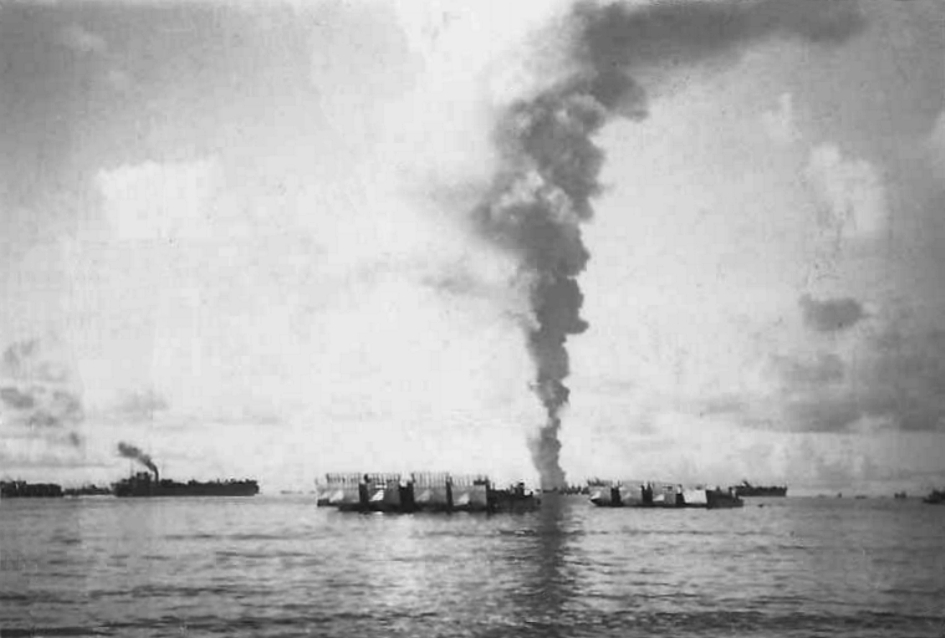
Mississinewa sinking at Ulithi after a Kaiten manned torpedo hit

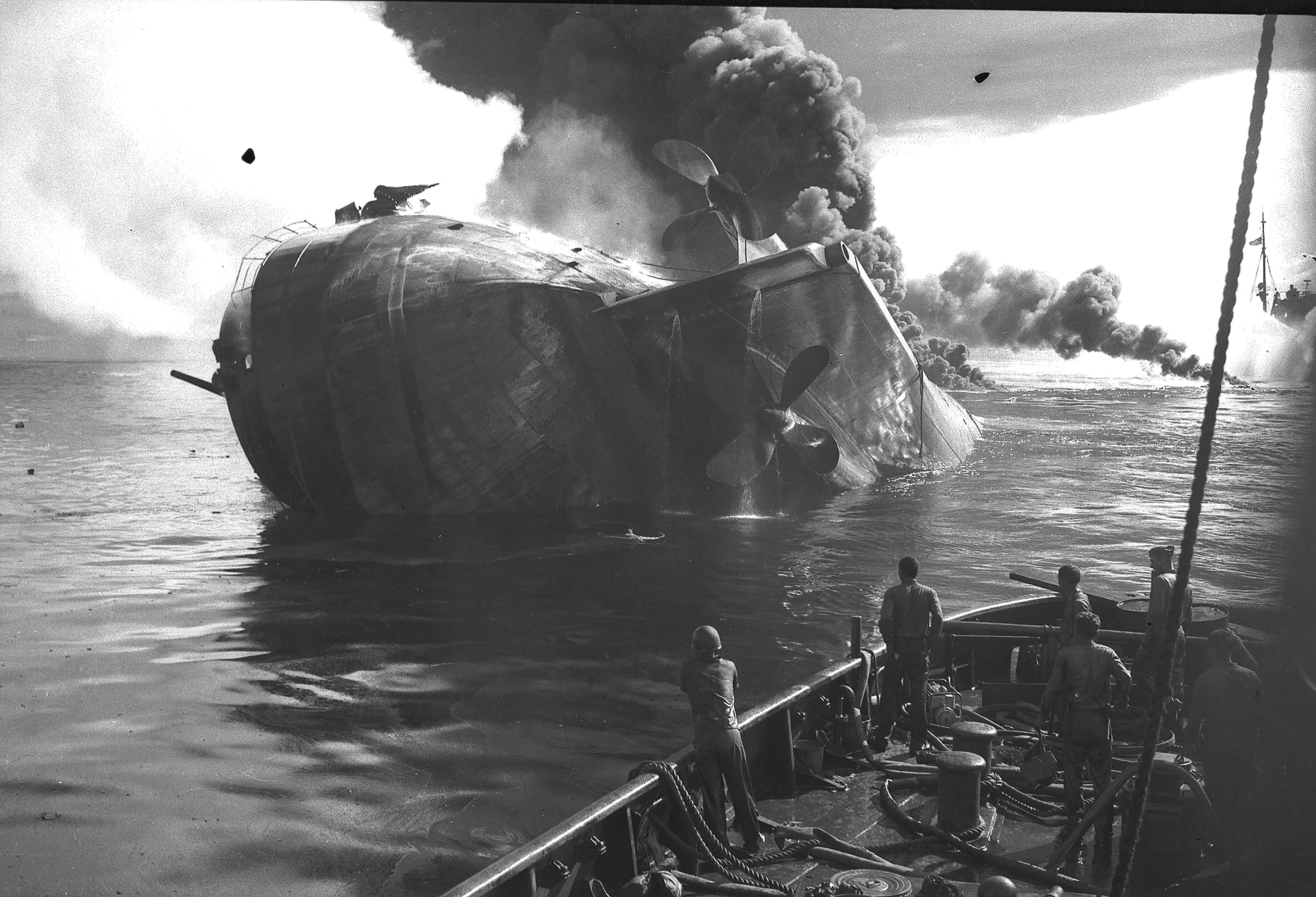
Mississinewa sinking on 20 November 1944

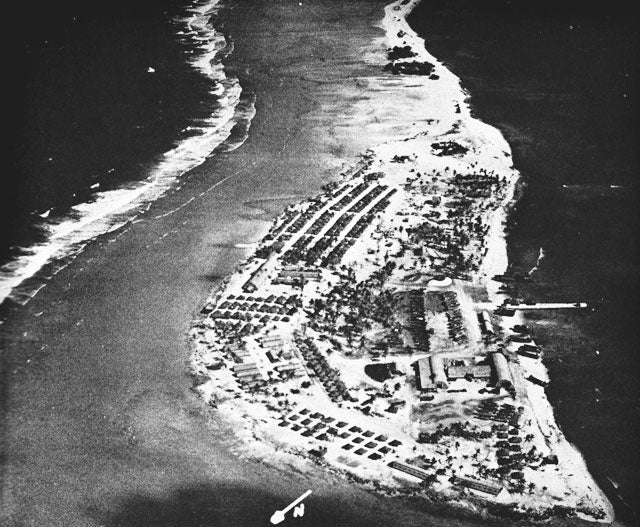
Sorlen Island in 1945, home to the Marine aviation camp, landing craft camp, small runway and 100-bed naval hospital

Naval Base Ulithi was a major United States Navy base at the Ulithi Atoll in the Caroline Islands in the western Pacific Ocean, to the north of New Guinea during World War II. The base was built to support the island-hopping Pacific War efforts of the Allied nations fighting the Empire of Japan. In terms of the number of ships at one base, Naval Base Ulithi was the largest naval base in the world in 1944 and 1945, with over 600 ships at times.

== Background ==
The Caroline Islands are now the Federated States of Micronesia nation. Micronesia comprises the Kosrae State, Pohnpei State, Chuuk State (formerly Truk) and Yap State. After the Spanish–American War in 1898, the islands became a German colony and German naval base.

At the start of World War I in 1914, British warships destroyed the German colonial plantation owner's radio station. On 7 October 1914, Japan invaded and took over Yap Island without a battle. Japan and Britain made a treaty giving Japan the Pacific islands north of the Equator, signed at the Treaty of Versailles in 1919.

In the 1930s, Japan built naval and airbases on many of the islands; Truk Lagoon was the largest and strongest of these bases. By the start of World War II, Japan's Truk base had five airfields, fleet anchorage, a few seaplane bases, torpedo boat bases, repair facilities, and later a radar station. Japan also built a large base at Ponape, now Pohnpei. In that conflict, the United States Army Air Forces repeatedly bombed the Truk base, but it was bypassed in the amphibious landing war. By February 1944, US bombers had destroyed most of Truk's military assets, and by sea, the US Navy had cut off Truk and its garrison of 5,000 Japanese troops. The US also bypassed Ponape in the Senyavin Islands and its 8,000 troops.

The US Army 81st Division landed unopposed on Ulithi on 23 September 1944; the survey ship USS Sumner found the lagoon was well-protected and usable for fleet anchorage, with depths ranging from 80 to 100 feet. Soon, US Navy Seabees started work building the large base at Ulithi, taking advantage of the islands' geography: the Ulithi coral reef is about 20 miles long and 10 miles wide, with over 30 small islands. The largest island is only half a square mile in area. The four largest islands are Sorlen, Falalop, Asor, and Mogmog, with bases built on all four. Japan bombed the US base at Ulithi a few times, with only marginal damage.

== Base construction ==
Naval Base Ulithi was in use from 1944 to 1945 for staging operations and attacks on Japanese bases to the north, as part of US Naval Base Carolines. The US Navy Seabee 18th Special Battalion arrived on 1 October, followed by the 88th Naval Construction Battalion on 11 November. The Seabees did major construction on five islands of the atoll, notably including building a large fleet recreation center on Mogmog Island for 20,000 troops, docking piers, small plane airstrips, seaplane base, pontoon piers, and camps.

On Mogmog Island, the Seabees built the Seabees' own base camp and Seabee supply depot. On Sorlen Island, they constructed a 1,600-place theatre, a large landing craft camp, 1,600-man mess hall, Naval headquarters, Marine aviation camp and 100-bed Naval hospital. Over 9,000 men were stationed at the base to run the operations.

The Seabee 58th Naval Construction Battalion did R&R at Ulithi before departing to Okinawa Island. After Typhoon Cobra in December 1944, Naval Base Ulithi sent out ships to pick up survivors of ships that had sunk in the storm. Some ships that were damaged in the storm were also repaired at Ulithi.

Ulithi had a large fleet anchorage used for staging and repair of ships. The Seabees built an airbase to support half of a night fighter squadron, a utility squadron, and a light inshore patrol squadron. At the airbase, the Navy kept up to 150 aircraft fighter planes to replace any lost on aircraft carriers. Staging facilities for transport aircraft were constructed. A large camp was built for the maintenance crews of planes and ships. A camp was built to house crews of ships under repair. A supply depot was built to support the ships, planes, and troops at Ulithi. Most supplies like fuel, ammunition, and spare parts were stored in cargo ships in the atoll and unloaded as needed. Seabees handled over 20,000 tons of cargo per month.

The 18th Special departed 25 May 1945 to Leyte-Samar Naval Base. On 10 October 1944, part of the 6th Special Battalion arrived at Ulithi for unloading and loading of ships, with the 6th handling over 12,000 tons of cargo per month. The 6th departed in June 1945, ending its work. The 51st Battalion arrived on 8 October 1944 and widened, lengthened, and improved Falalop Airfield. A 3,500-by-150-foot fighter runway was built. The 51st also built a fuel tank frame and fuel pier. On 16 April 1945, the Seabee Naval Construction Battalion Detachment 1044 arrived. Most of the 1044th worked on damage control and repair sections at the base. The 1044 departed 25 July 1945, ending their work.

The 88th Naval Construction Battalion departed Ulithi on 7 February 1945 and arrived at Bobon, Samar, Philippine Islands on 10 February. There, they built a PT boat repair base as part of the Leyte-Samar Naval Base. On 8 November 1944, Naval Construction Maintenance Unit 603 arrived to do general maintenance of the airstrip. The Fleet Post Office at Ulithi was #3011. When Leyte-Samar Naval Base was completed, much of the operation at Ulithi was transferred to it, departing on 7 May 1945. During its operation, the base also supported the nearby Naval Base Kossol Roads.

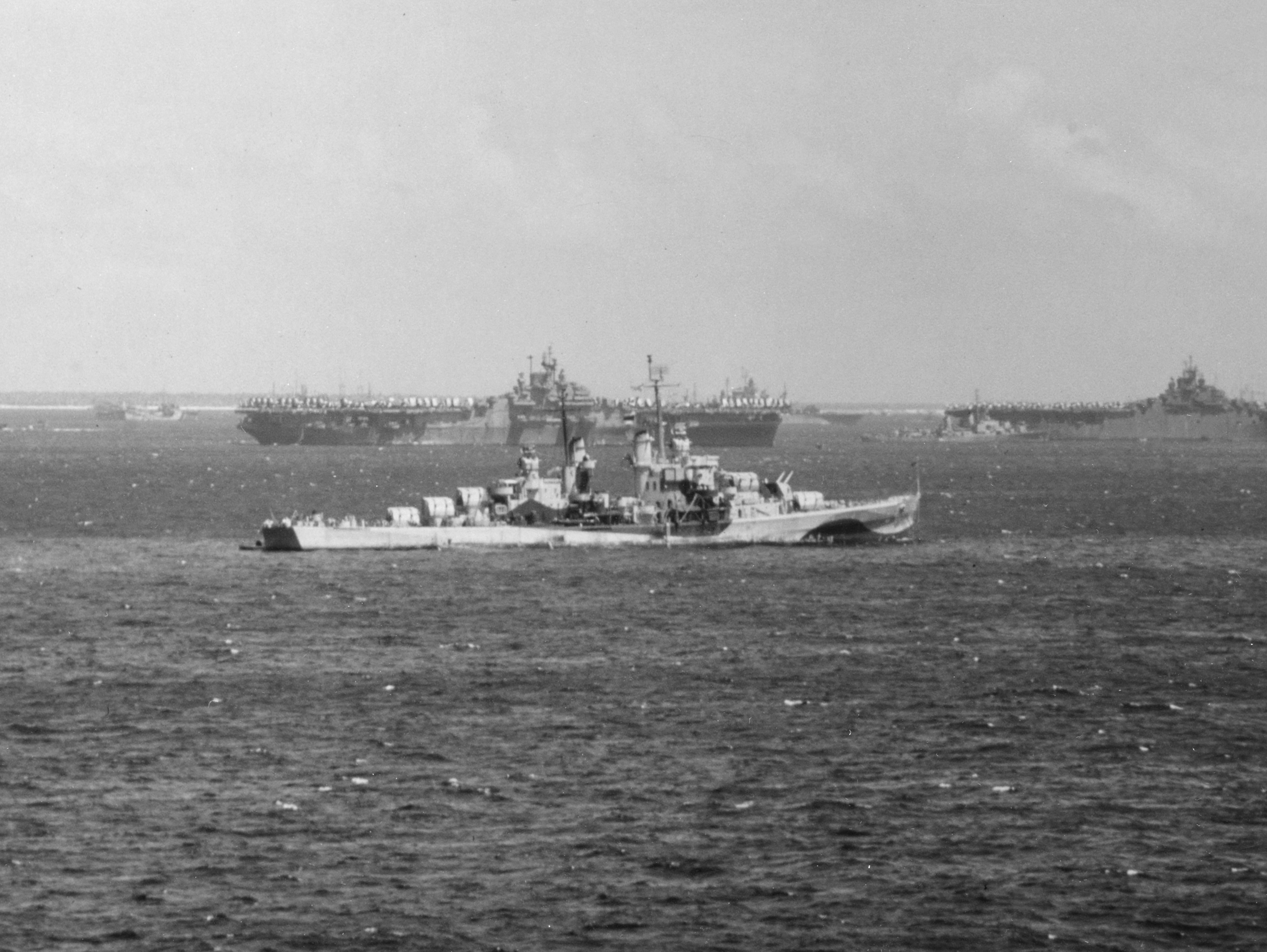
Fifth Fleet's USS Flint (CL-97) at Ulithi in March 1945 before departing to Okinawa

== Fleet support ==
The United States Fifth Fleet used Ulithi for staging major operations, including the Philippines campaign, Operation Hailstone and the troop landings at Okinawa. In March 1945 106 destroyers, 29 aircraft carriers, 15 battleships, and 23 cruisers departed for Okinawa. The base was kept secret until found by Japan, and Japan attacked the Fifth Fleet at Ulithi in Operation Tan No. 2 on 11 March 1945 using long-range kamikaze.

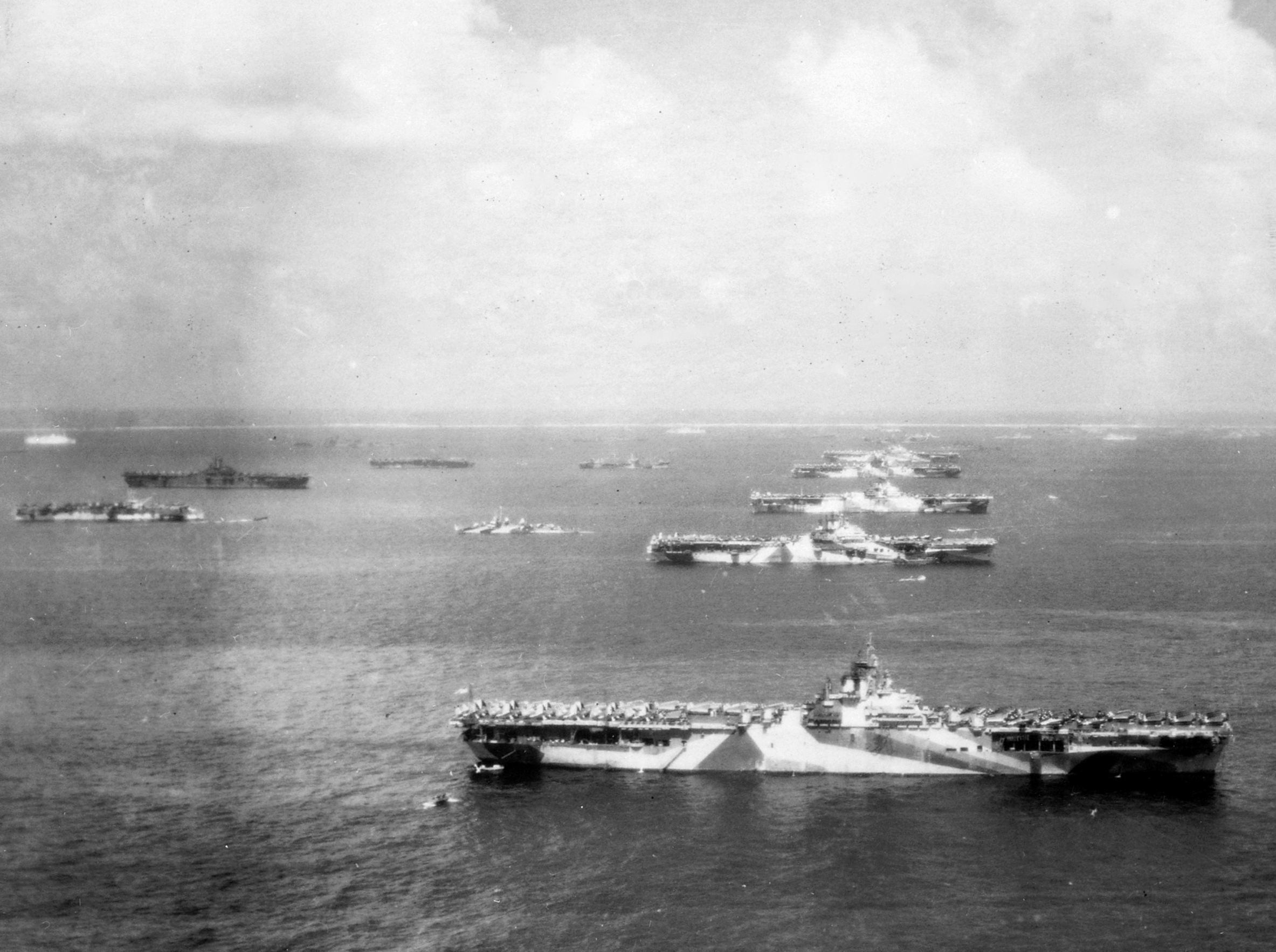
Murderers row, a baseball reference given to the Third Fleet carriers at Ulithi Atoll in December 1944: USS Wasp (CV-18), USS Yorktown (CV-10), USS Hornet (CV-12), USS Hancock (CV-19), and USS Ticonderoga (CV-14), part of Fast Carrier Task Force

In October 1944 a carrier battle group from Task Force 38 of the United States Third Fleet under William Halsey arrived at Ulithi for resupply. Murderers' Row was the nickname given to the Third Fleet's aircraft carriers at anchor in a row at Ulithi. In the row were USS Wasp (CV-18), USS Yorktown (CV-10), USS Hornet (CV-12), USS Hancock (CV-19), and USS Ticonderoga (CV-14).

After the Third Fleet was hit by Typhoon Cobra in December 1944, it ported in Ulithi. The typhoon, which became known as Halsey's Typhoon, caused heavy damage to the ships, the sinking of three destroyers, and the loss of 146 aircraft. The destroyers lost were the USS Spence (DD-512), USS Hull (DD-350), and USS Monaghan (DD-354). In total, 790 crewmen died.

As a result, court of inquiry was held aboard the destroyer tender USS Cascade on 26 December to determine if Halsey should be sanctioned for sailing into the typhoon. The court found "errors in judgment committed under stress of war operations and stemming from a commendable desire to meet military requirements".

== Attacks on the base ==
Japanese navy forces made several attacks on Ulithi, which represented an important strategic target, with over 100,000 barrels of fuel oil stored at Ulithi in tanker ships and land depots. Naval Base Ulithi also supported a number of other smaller bases in the Naval Base Carolines.

On 20 November 1944, the fleet oiler USS Mississinewa (AO-59) was hit at Ulithi by a Japanese kaiten-manned torpedo; the ship exploded and sank, with a loss of 63 crew members. However, four other kaiten did not hit any other ships.

On 11 March 1945, the Operation Tan No. 2 kamikaze raid took off from Kanoya Air Field to attack Ulithi. The kamikaze aircraft hit in a nighttime raid on Ulithi, striking USS Randolph (CV-15) on her stern starboard side; Randolph lost 27 men and 105 were wounded. However, Randolph was quickly repaired at Ulithi and put back in service.

Japan planned a major submarine attack on Ulithi, but it was canceled with the surrender of Japan in September 1945, while the submarines were en route. With the news of surrender, the I-400 fleet returned to Japan.

== Facilities ==
=== Airfields ===
- Falalop Airfield, now Ulithi Airport, on Falalop Island, built by Japan, but abandoned, improved by Navy Seabees. A single runway spanning the entire width of the island. US Marine Air Group 45 (MAG-45), VMSB-24, and Service Squadron 45 with its headquarters were stationed at Falalop. MAG-45 and VMSB-24 flew missions to Japan's bases on Yap Island, Fais Island and Sorol Island, with their Grumman TBF Avenger, Grumman F6F Hellcat and Curtiss SB2C Helldiver. MAG-45 also flew anti-submarine patrols to protect Ulithi. The Marine Avengers sank two of the midget subs, only one sank a ship, a US Navy oiler at Ulithi.
- Sorlen Airfield on Sorlen Island, Built by Seabees, an airfield for light aircraft. Started 12 December 1944, and completed January 27, 1945.
- Mogmog Airfield, light aircraft, built on Mogmog Island to support the Mogmog Island Seabee camp and the Mogmog Island recreation center. Seabess started building on 12 December 1944 and completed on 27 January 1945.
  - At the three airfields the Navy kept up to 150 aircraft fighters to replace any lost on aircraft carriers.
- Mogmog seaplane base, a floating seaplane base, supported by seaplane tenders.
- Falalop Seaplane base on Falalop Island and in the atoll. Falalop Island base built starting 4 November 1944 and completed 5 December 1944
- Fais Airfield is to the east of Ulithi by 87 km (54 miles) on Fais Island. Ulithi supported the 3,000 feet runway built there in 1945. The runway was mostly used as an emergency landing strip.

=== LORAN station ===
The United States Coast Guard built a LORAN (Long Range Navigational Signal) station at Ulithi in December 1944 and operated the station on Potoangroas Island till February 1945. For the Korean War the LORAN station was moved to Falalop Island near the Falalop Airfield, as Potoangroas Island was only resupplied by sea, and in rough weather there was no resupply. The Ulithi LORAN Station was closed in February 1962 and moved to Yap Island. In 1978 the Global Positioning System replaced the need for LORAN.

=== Mogmog Island ===
US Navy Seabees turned the swamps and forest on Mogmog Island (Mog Mof) into a large Ulithi fleet recreation center. The Seabees built the Ulithi Seabees camp with barracks and depot. At the depot Seabees stored all the supplies and gear needed to build and maintain the base at Ulithi.

The Mogmog Island recreation center had a bandstand, a refreshment center, a 1,200-seat theatre with a 25-by-40-foot stage, a sport center with 4 baseball diamonds and 200-seat chapel. The recreation center could house up to 8,000 men and 1,000 officers daily. Mogmog Island had a large recreation beach resort for those on leave. The Navy had an ice cream barge that could make up to 500 gallons of ice cream for the troops in 8 hours. The barge would also make fresh bread products. The base officer's and chief petty officer's club was built on Mogmog Island.

Mogmog Airfield was constructed for light aircraft for short trips to the other nearby islands. Off the shore of Mogmog Island in the atoll was the Mogmog floating seaplane base, supported by seaplane tenders.

=== Asor Island ===
Naval Base Ulithi headquarters and the military cemetery were built on Asor Island. The 6th Special Naval Construction Battalion was in charge of most burial details. The 63 men lost during the attack on the USS Mississinewa AO-59, were given interment at Ulithi cemetery, as were some of those lost on the USS Franklin. After the war the cemetery was closed, with the troops reinterred in new, permanent cemeteries in the states.

=== Sorlen Island ===
On Sorlen Island a second and small fleet recreation center was built. The main part of the recreation center was the 1,600 seat movie theater. A distillation center and 5,000-gallon storage tanks system was built to make freshwater. While the US Marine fighter base was on Falalop Island, a camp for Marine aviation was built on Sorlen Island, with barrack and mess halls. Naval Base Ulithi had many landing craft used to move gear and personal from ship to ship and ship to shore.

On Sorlen Island a large landing craft camp was built. The Fifth Fleet and Third Fleet had hundreds of landing craft used in amphibious landings, that used the camp and depot for maintaining the craft when needed. A quonset naval hospital was constructed on Sorlen Island with a 100-bed unit. A power plant was built to supply electricity. Seabees built the Sorlen Airfield for small plane use.

=== Submarine base ===
Many US Navy submarines were used in the Pacific War. The submarines attacked warships and sank supply ships that were needed by Japan to resupply their many bases in the Pacific. US subs also did reconnaissance patrols, landed guerrilla special forces and search and rescue missions for downed aircrew men. US submarines had long ranges, but needed to be resupplied with fuel, food, torpedoes and deck gun shells. At Naval Base Ulithi the Navy set up a floating submarine base in the atoll.

The submarine tenders USS Sperry (AS-12) and USS Sumner (AGS-5) were stationed in the atoll to supply the submarines. While the submarine was being resupplied, and repaired if needed, crews could have a break (R&R) at the Ulithi's fleet recreation center on Mogmog Island. Some of the subs stationed at the base were: USS Albacore (SS-218), USS Skate (SS-305), and USS Flying Fish (SS-229).

=== Repair depot ===
The US Navy set up a large ship and boat repair depot at Naval Base Ulithi. The repair depot provided the fleet with support to keep ships and subs tactically available in the Pacific War with the repair and supply depot, rather than ships having to return to continental United States. The Navy had built special auxiliary floating drydocks that were able to repair battle damage to even the largest ships and do regular maintenance in the field saving ships trans-pacific travel time for repair. Supply store ships were also at the base with the parts needed to keep the fleet ready.

The most noted ship repaired at the depot was the USS Franklin (CV-13). The USS Franklin on 19 March 1945 was hit by Japanese bombs off Okinawa. Fire and explosions damaged the ship, killing and wounding many. The crew was able to save the badly damaged ship. Under her own power, she made it to Ulithi repair depot for emergency repairs before going to the Brooklyn Navy Yard for a year-long complete rebuild.

The USS Houston (CL-81) and USS Reno (CL-96) also had emergency repairs at Ulithi. USS Hancock (CV-19) and USS Ticonderoga (CV-14) were repaired at the base after kamikaze attacks. The USS Bennington (CV-20) was repaired with a badly damaged flight deck from Typhoon Cobra.

- Some of the Ulithi repair depot ships and crafts:
- USS AFDB-2, very large Auxiliary floating drydock able to repair battleships
- USS Richland (YFD-64), Auxiliary floating drydock
- USS Oak Ridge (ARDM-1), Auxiliary floating drydock
- USS Endurance (ARDM-3), Auxiliary floating drydock
- AFDL-32, a type of Small Auxiliary Floating Dry Docks
- USS ARD-13, ARD Auxiliary floating drydock, mostly destroyer repair
- USS ARD-15, ARD Auxiliary floating drydock, mostly destroyer repair
- USS ARD-23, ARD Auxiliary floating drydock, mostly destroyer repair
- USS Jason (AR-8), large repair ship
- USS Ajax, large repair ship
- USS Nestor (ARB-6), repair ship and small craft tender
- USS Oceanus (ARB-2), battle damage repair ship
- USS Vestal, large repair ship
- USS Mona Island (ARG-9), repair ship and flagship for MinRon 10
- USS Deliver (ARS-23), rescue and salvage ship
- USS Shackle (ARS-9), rescue and salvage ship
- USS Fortune (IX-146), an aircraft stores ship. Fleet issue ship effective 10 January 1945.
- USS Supply (IX-147), an aircraft stores ship for the land-based Marine Aircraft Group (MAG-45).
- USS Grumium (IX-174), an aircraft stores ship.
- YRB-34, Floating Workshop

=== Seaplane bases ===
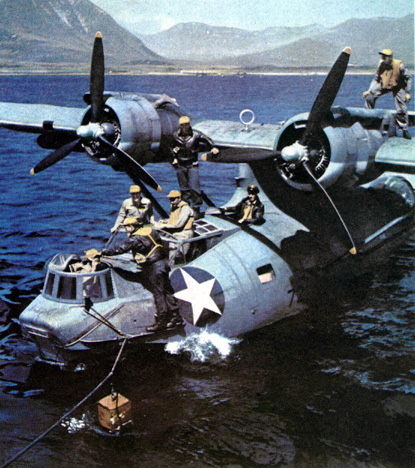
A Consolidated PBY Catalina seaplane crew

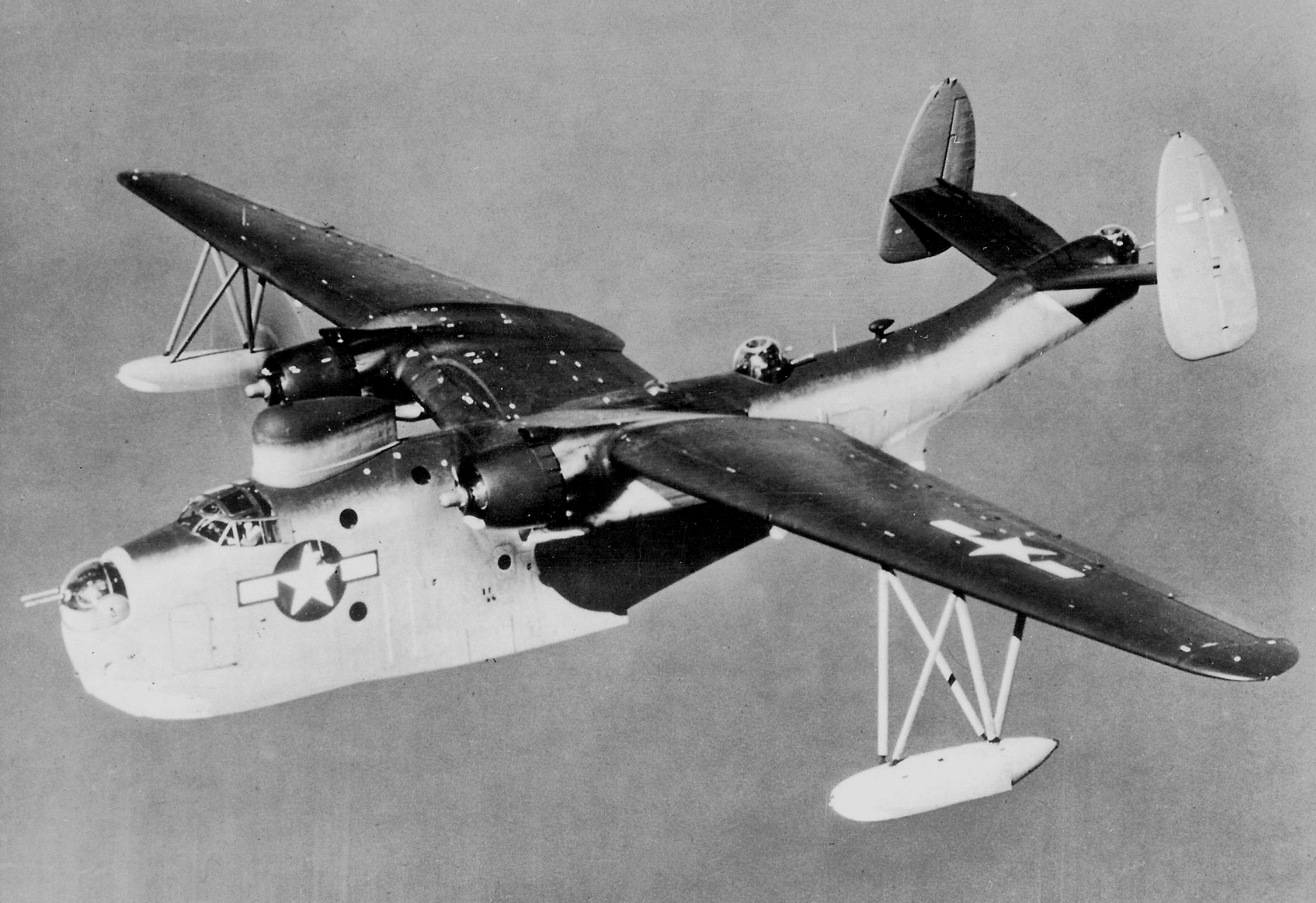
Martin PBM-5 Mariner seaplane in flight

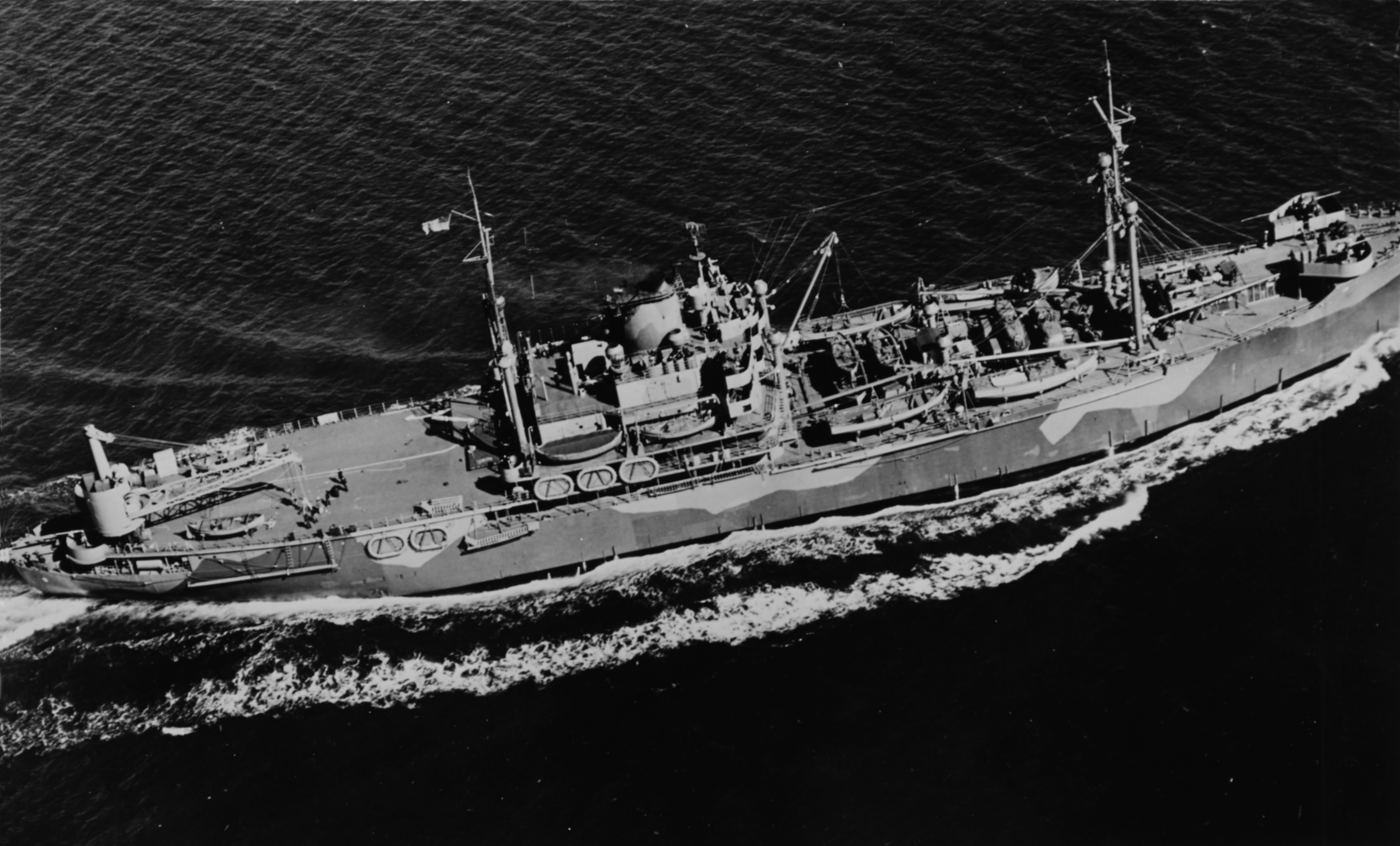
USS Pocomoke (AV-9) a seaplane tender. The crane at the rear of the ship is used to bring a seaplane on to the deck for repair and serving. The remaining parts of the ship are for the ship's and seaplane crew, also the ship's and seaplane fuel. The ship's stores would have crew's food and spare parts for seaplanes.

The US Navy set up a two large seaplane base at Naval Base Ulithi, Falalop seaplane base and Mogmog seaplane base. Seaplanes did reconnaissance patrols and search, also rescue missions for downed aircrew and survivors of sunk ships. The most common seaplanes at the base were Consolidated PBY Catalina and Martin PBM Mariner. The Mogmog seaplane base take off and landing was a spot marked in the atoll off the fleet recreation center on Mogmog Island.

The seaplanes were supported by a floating base of seaplane tenders. The second seaplane base was on Falalop Island. On Falalop Island a seaplane ramp was constructed by the Seabees at one end of Falalop airfield. The seaplane ramp extended from the extreme low tide mark to the seaplane parking hardstand. The Falalop seaplane base was completed on 5 December 1944. Seaplane tenders and land base had stores to supply: food, fuel, ammo, spare parts.

The seaplane tender also had housing and mess halls for the aircrew while the seaplane was being serviced. Aircrew on leave could go to Ulithi's fleet recreation center on Mogmog Island. Some seaplane tenders were stationed at Ulithi seaplane base for months. Other seaplane tenders came to Naval Base Ulithi to resupply the ship's stores before returning to a US Naval Advance Base. Some came to Ulithi repair depot to be repaired. Some seaplane tenders at Naval Base Ulithi:

- USS Corson (AVP-37)
- USS Hamlin (AV-15)
- USS Casco (AVP-12)
- USS Suisun
- USS Chandeleur (AV-10)
- USS Mackinac (AVP-13)
- USS Barataria (AVP-33)
- USS Chincoteague (AVP-24)
- USS Kenneth Whiting (AV-14)
- USS Onslow (AVP-48)
- USS Pocomoke (AV-9)
- USS St. George (AV-16)
- USS Duxbury Bay (AVP-38)
- USS San Pablo (AVP-30)
- USS Yakutat (AVP-32)
- USS Cumberland Sound (AV-17)
- USS Shelikof (AVP-52)
- USS Coos Bay
- YSD-42 Seaplane Wrecking Derrick
- UN Navy seaplane Squadrons based at Ulithi seaplane base:
- VPB-13 with Consolidated PB2Y Coronado
- VPB-17 with Martin PBM Mariner
- VPB-18 with Martin PBM Mariner
- VPB-20 with Martin PBM Mariner
- VPB-23 with Consolidated PBY Catalina
- VP-41 with Martin PBM Mariner
- VP-42 with Martin PBM Mariner
- VP-48 with Martin PBM Mariner
- VPB-202 with Martin PBM Mariner

=== Submarine chaser base ===
To help protect the base and shipping around the base, Naval Base Ulithi had a fleet of submarine chasers. The submarine chasers were supported by a submarine chaser tender ship: the USS Mindanao (ARG-3) was stationed at Ulithi to support the fleet of submarine chasers and some crash boats. crash boats were fast boats use to rescue downed airmen. Some of the submarine chasers that served at Ulithi: USS PC-1137, USS PC-598, USS PC-1136, USS PGM-18, and USS PC-1138.

=== Destroyer base ===
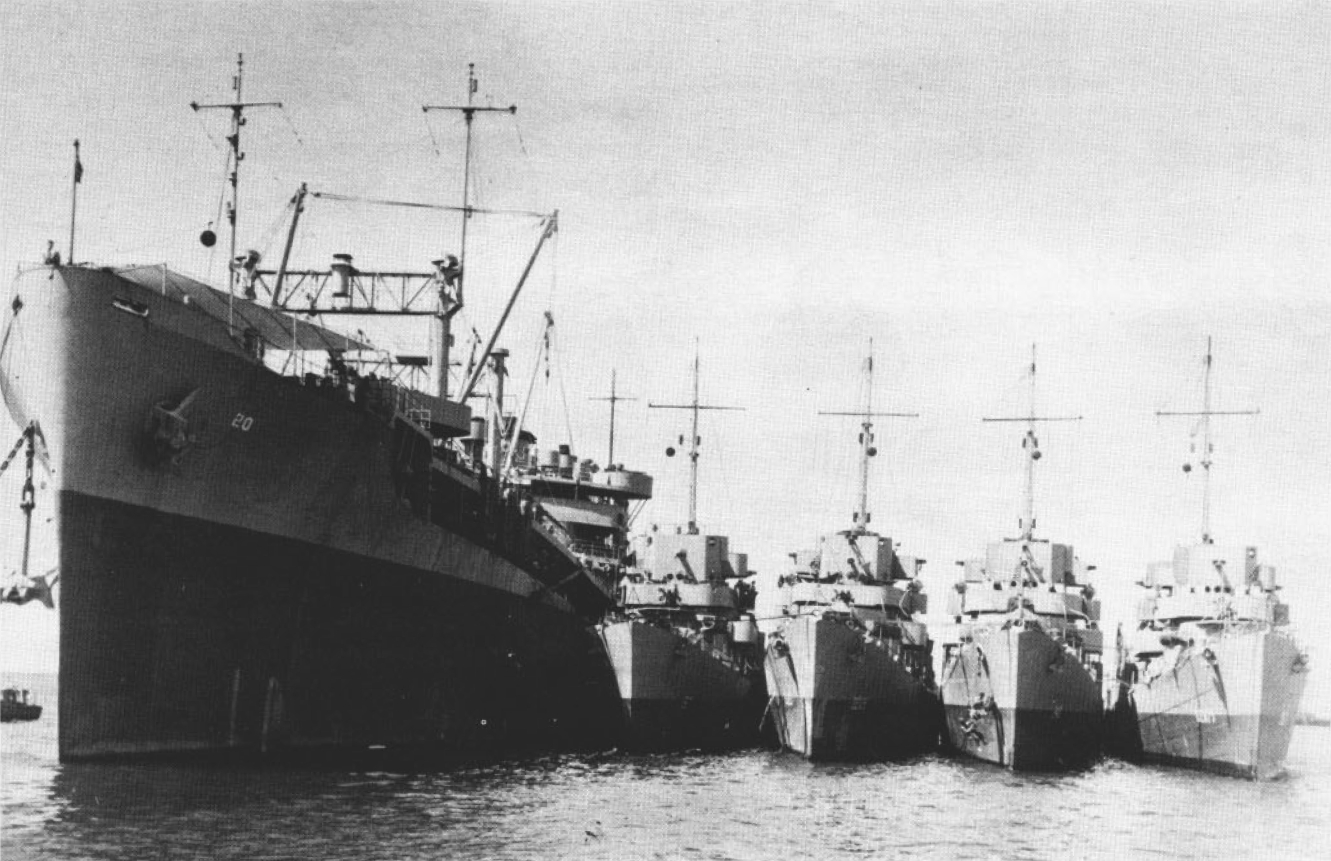
USS Hamul (AD-20), a destroyer tender, with destroyer escorts during World War II

Hundreds of US Navy destroyers were used in the Pacific war. Destroyers were used to protect capital ships like aircraft carriers, battleships and heavy cruisers. Destroyers were used to screen and protect convoy of ships. Destroyers were used to hunt submarines and protect amphibious landings at beaches. Destroyers had anti-aircraft guns, radar, and forward-launched ASW weapons, dual-purpose guns, depth charges, and torpedoes.

Like the submarines, the destroyers needed to be restocked with food, fuel, supplies, and weapons to be kept operational. Ulithi had a large destroyer base, with destroyer tenders. Destroyer tenders could do minor repair work on the ships also, and major work could be done at the Ulithi repair depot.

Destroyer tenders stationed at Ulithi:

- USS Cascade (AD-16)
- USS Prairie (AD-15)
- USS Piedmont (AD-17)
- USS Yosemite (AD-19)
- USS Hamul (AD-20) to support Okinawa campaign damage
- USS Dixie (AD-14) September 1944 to February 1945
- USS Sierra (AD-18) 15 March 1945 to 25 May 1945
- USS Markab

=== Floating hospital ===
For four months (March to June) in 1945 Naval Base Ulithi was used as a major forward Naval hospital. US Navy Hospital ships were stationed Naval Base Ulithi during parts of the war and some were stationed shortly as they joined staging for upcoming invasions. Hospital ships also were able to resupply and refuel at the base.

- USS Relief (AH-1), 550-beds, stationed at Ulithi two times, received wounded from USS Randolph.
- USS Mercy (AH-8), up to 400 patients, stationed at Ulithi 5th Fleet to care for wounded from Battle of Okinawa.
- USS Samaritan (AH-10) up to 394 patients, stationed at Ulithi two times.
- USS Rescue (AH-18) up to 800 patients, was stationed at Ulithi in March 1945 before going to Okinawa.
- USS Solace (AH-5) up to 418 patients, stationed at Ulithi two times, was stationed at Ulithi in March 1945 before going to Okinawa.
- USS Tranquillity (AH-14) up to 802 patients, stationed at Ulithi near the end of war, departed Ulithi to help survivors from the USS Indianapolis (CA-35) sinking.
- USS Hope (AH-7), up to 400 patients, was stationed shortly at Ulithi in March 1945 before going to Okinawa.
- USS Bountiful (AH-9) up to 477 patients, stationed at Ulithi with Okinawa and Battle of Iwo Jima patients.

== Net laying ==
To protect the many ships at Ulithi the Navy had 1,260 yards of anti-torpedo net installed in the Towachi Channel and 6,390 yards at other inlets to the atoll. The ship USS Tuscana (AKN-3) supplied the nets.

- Net laying ships stationed at Ulithi
- USS Viburnum (AN-57) hit a mine while working on 28 October 1944, was repaired at the base.
- USS Anaqua
- USS Snowbell (AN-52)
- USS Rosewood (AN-31)
- USS Cornel (AN-45)

== Stationed at Ulithi ==
- Over 6,000 seamen were at Ulithi, stationed in ships and on shore bases.

On 13 March 1945, there were 647 ships at anchor at Ulithi, some stationed, some in for repair or resupply. Just before the departure of the fleet to Okinawa there were 722 ships at Ulithi. United States Merchant Navy ships also were unloaded at Naval Base Ulithi to keep the fleet and base supplied.

- Service Squadron 10, a floating 400 ship base with tankers, Fleet oilers, refrigerator ships, ammunition ships, supply ships, floating docks and repair ships. Service Squadron 10 started departing Enewetak Atoll 4 October 1944 for Ulithi arriving on the 15th.

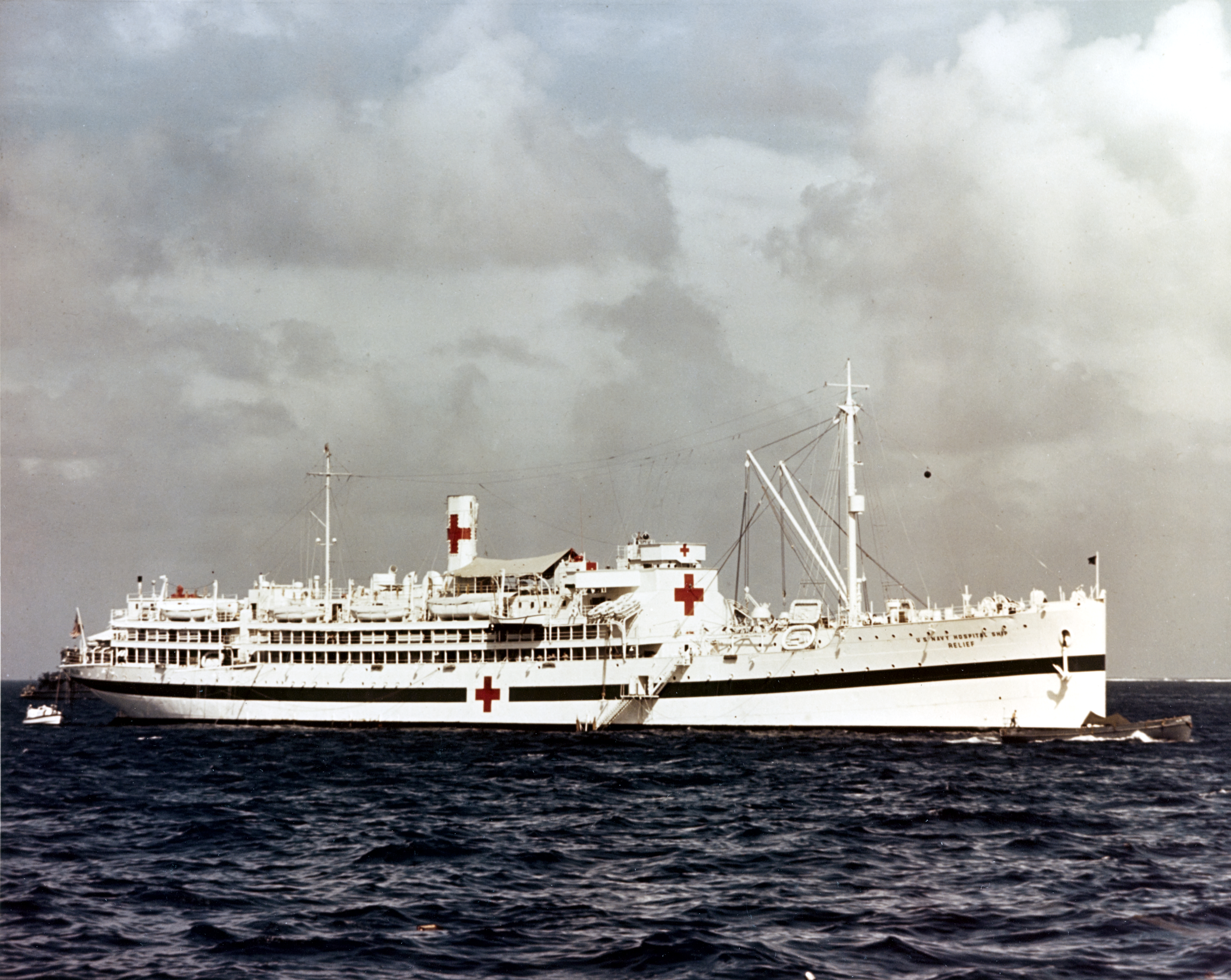
USS Relief (AH-1) hospital ship in 1945

- USS Abatan, distilling ship freshwater from the sea for land base and small vessels.
- USS Dauphin (APA-97), floating barracks, troopship
- USS Amador, ammunition tender
- USS Firedrake (AE-14), ammunition tender
- USS Lassen (AE-3), ammunition tender stores
- SS Plymouth Victory, ammunition stores
- USS Turkey (AM-13), minesweeper
- USS Sabine (AO-25), carrier oiler
- USS Aucilla, carrier oiler
- USS Marias (AO-57), battleship oiler
- USS Platte (AO-24), battleship oiler
- USS Taluga (AO-62), cruisers oiler
- USS Sepulga (AO-20), cruisers oiler
- USS Cowanesque (AO-79), destroyer oiler
- USS Chotauk (IX-188), destroyer oiler
- USS Elk (IX-115), destroyer oiler
- USS Malvern (IX-138), destroyer oiler
- USS Genesee (AOG-8), oiler
- USS Enoree (AO-69), oiler
- USS Nantahala (AO-60), oiler
- USS Tombigbee (AOG-11), oiler
- USS Saranac (AO-74), oiler
- USS Neosho (AO-48), oiler
- USS Caliente (AO-53), oiler
- USS Pecos (AO-65), oiler
- USS Cimarron (AO-22), oiler
- USS Standard Arrow (ID-1532), oiler
- USS Wabash (AOG-4), oiler
- USS Arethusa (IX-135), oiler
- USS Inca (IX-229), oiler
- USS Neches (AO-47), oiler
- USS Lackawanna (AO-40), oiler
- USS Gazelle (IX-116), oiler
- USS Kaskaskia (AO-27), oiler
- USS Antona (IX-133), oiler tanker barge
- YO-76, oiler tanker barge
- USS Bullwheel (YO-46), oiler tanker barge
- USS Gamage (IX-227), storage for lubricants and drummed petroleum
- USS Giraffe (IX-118), gasoline tanker
- USS Quiros, water tanker
- USS Athanasia, stores ship
- USS Palisana (AF-39), stores ship
- USS Latona (AF-35), stores ship
- USS Graffias (AF-29), stores ship
- USS Trefoil (IX-149), stores ship
- USS Quartz (IX-150), stores ship
- USS Megrez (AK-126), stores ship
- USS Aldebaran, food stores ship
- USS Polaris (AF-11), food stores ship
- USS Sirius (AF-60), refrigerator food stores ship
- USS Rutilicus (AK-113), food stores ship
- SS Cape Pilar, merchant food stores ship
- USS Ascella, medical stores ship
- USS Azimech, medical stores ship
- USS Iolanda, stores ship
- USS Carmita (IX-152), stores ship
- USS Arctic (AF-7), stores ship
- USS Gordonia (AF-43), stores ship
- USS Hesperia, stores ship
- USS Volans, stores ship
- USS Karin (AF-33), stores ship
- USS Adria, stores ship
- USS Antares (AG-10), stores ship
- USS Lioba (AF-36), stores ship
- USS Kerstin (AF-34), stores ship
- USS Luna, stores ship
- USS Corundum (IX-164), spare parts
- USS Trefoil (IX-149), stores ship
- USS Silica (IX-151) fresh, frozen food, and dry provisions,
- APL-14 - propelled barracks ship
- APL-15 - propelled barracks ship
- USS Orvetta (IX-157), barracks ship
- USS Sea Hag, barracks ship
- USS Seaward (IX-209) troopship and mail ship (was USS LST-278)
- YF-1038 cover lighter Type B ship
- YG-36, YG-33 and YG-37 self-propelled Garbage lighter
- YF-254 lighter
- YC-1006 lighter
- YP-688 lighter
- YF-788 lighter
- YF-786 lighter
- USS Turkey (AMS-56) minesweeper
- USS Unadilla (ATA-182) Tugboat, Type V ship
- USS Chickasaw (AT-83), Tug
- USS ATR 71, Tug
- USS AT 116, Tug
- USS YTB-372, Tug
- USS Hitchiti (ATF-103), Tug
- USS YTB-384, Tug
- USS Mobile Point, Tug
- USS Arapaho (ATF-68), Tug
- USS Point Loma, dredge ship
- USS Benson, dredge
- Landing Ship, Tanks (LST) for moving supplies
- Small landing craft for moving supplies and personal
- Motor Launch boats for moving personal

== Gallery ==
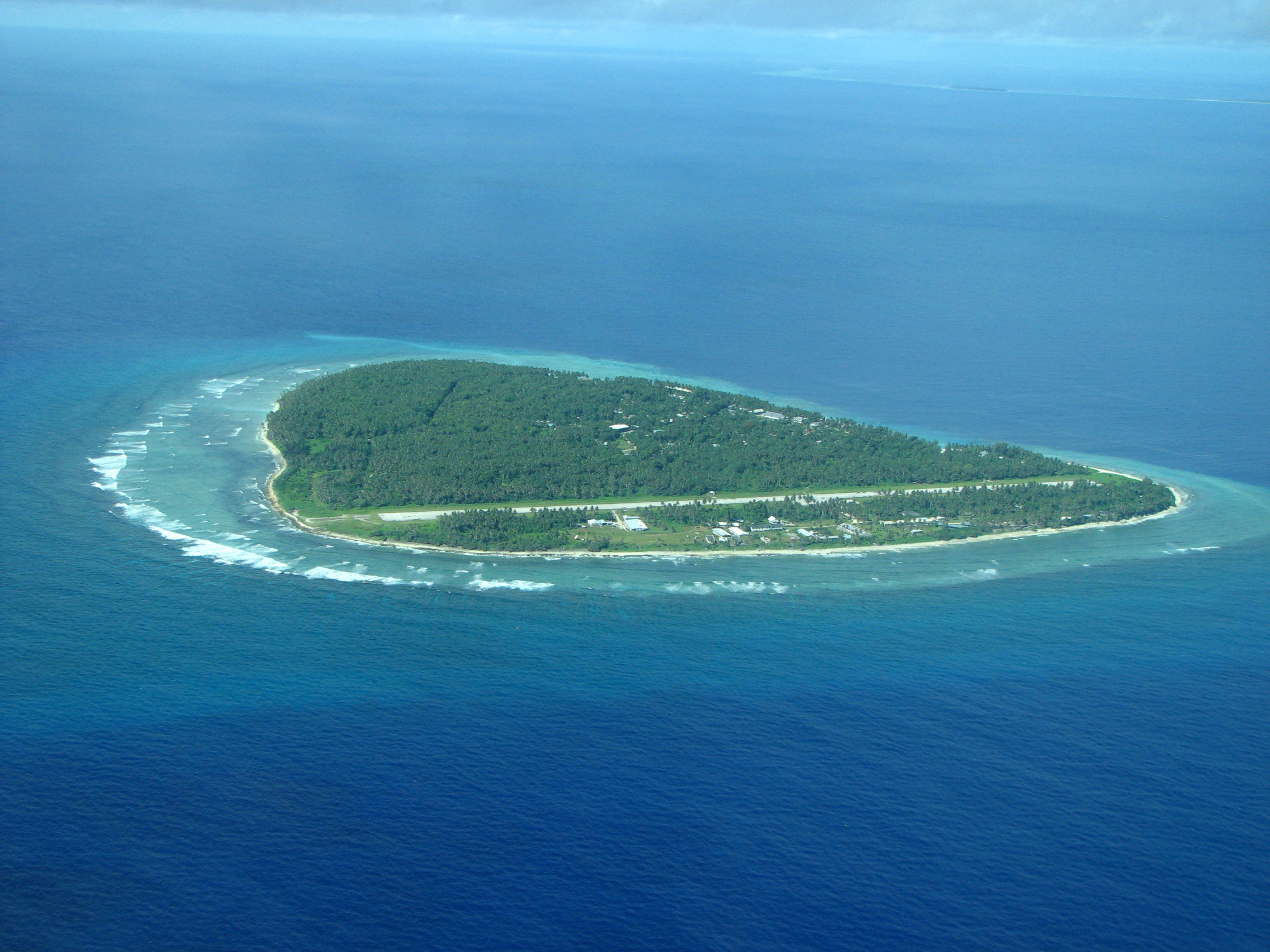
Falalop Island in Ulithi Atoll

Naval Base Ulithi US Navy North Anchorage chart from 1944 showing ship berthing locations

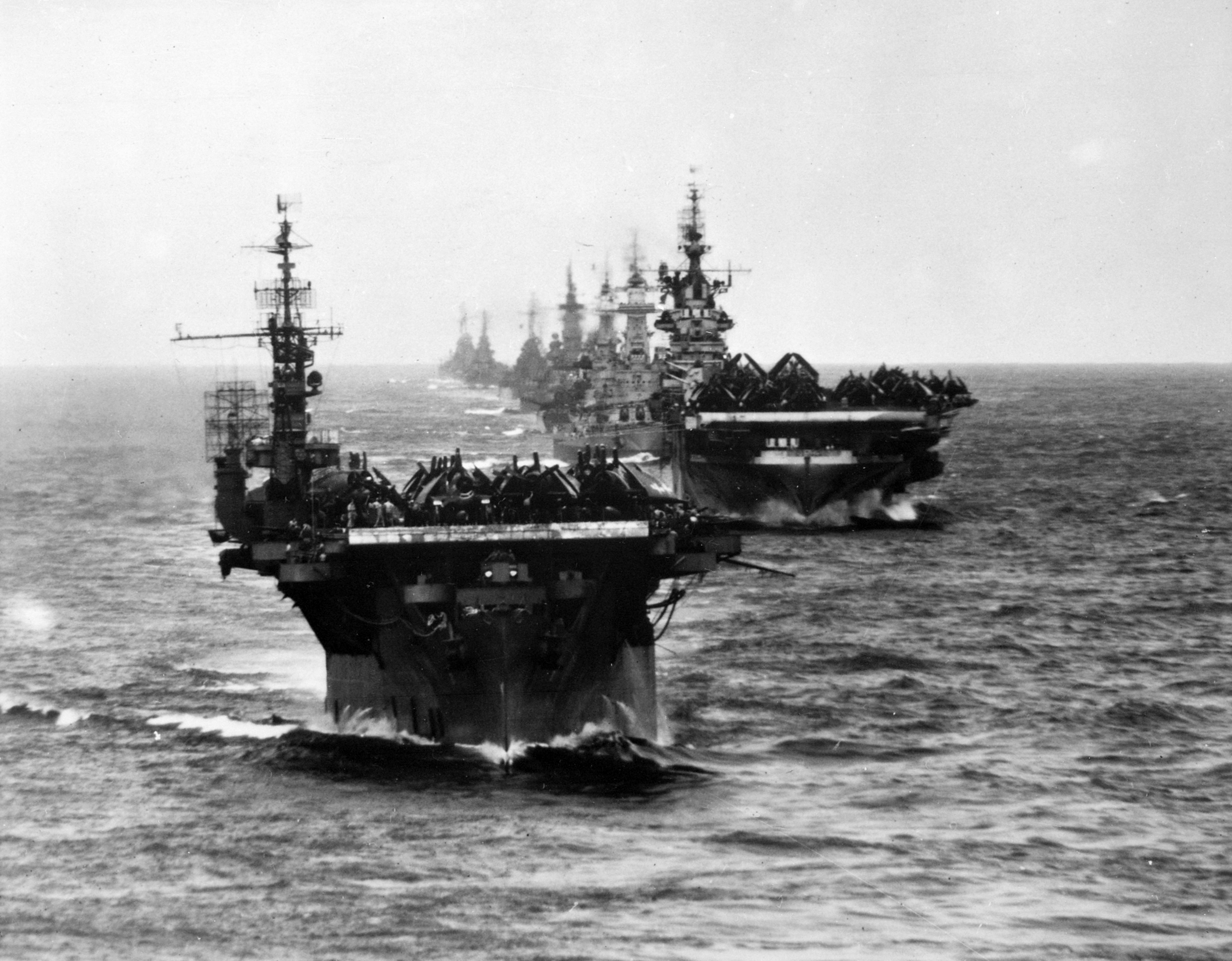
USS Langley (CVL-27) and other ships entering Ulithi 2 December 1944 after strikes in the Philippines.

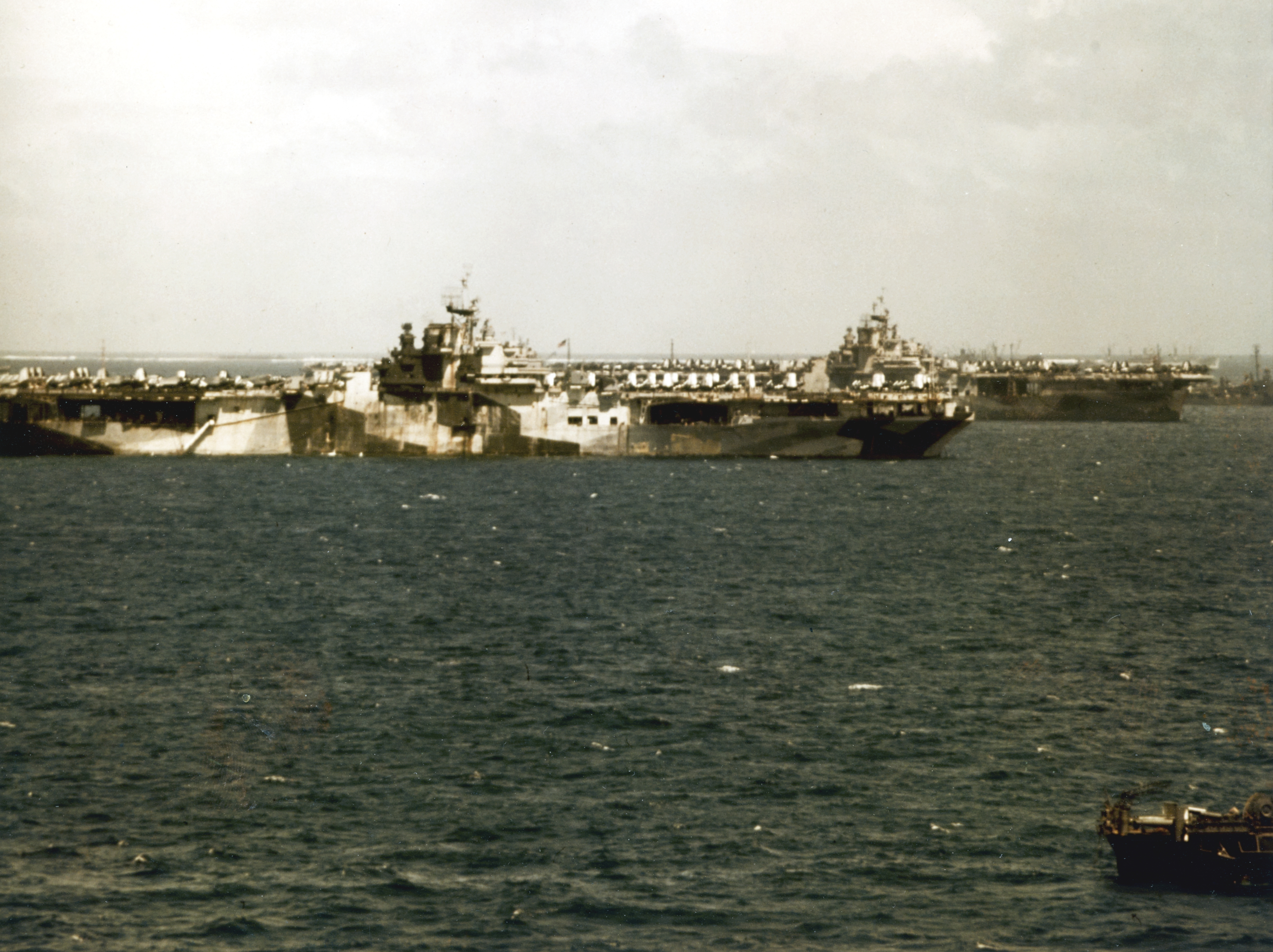
USS Hancock (CV-19) and USS Wasp (CV-18) at Ulithi in March 1945

At Ulithi a Kaiten manned torpedo that was sunk by a base airstrike. One Kaiten made it to the base and sank the USS Mississinewa on 20 November 1944.

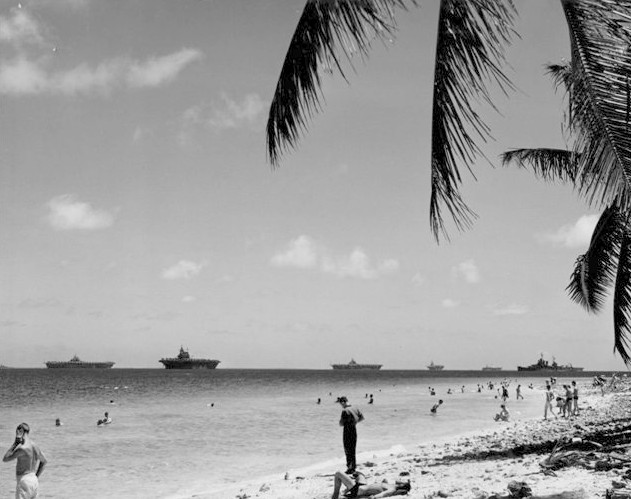
Ulithi beach in 1945

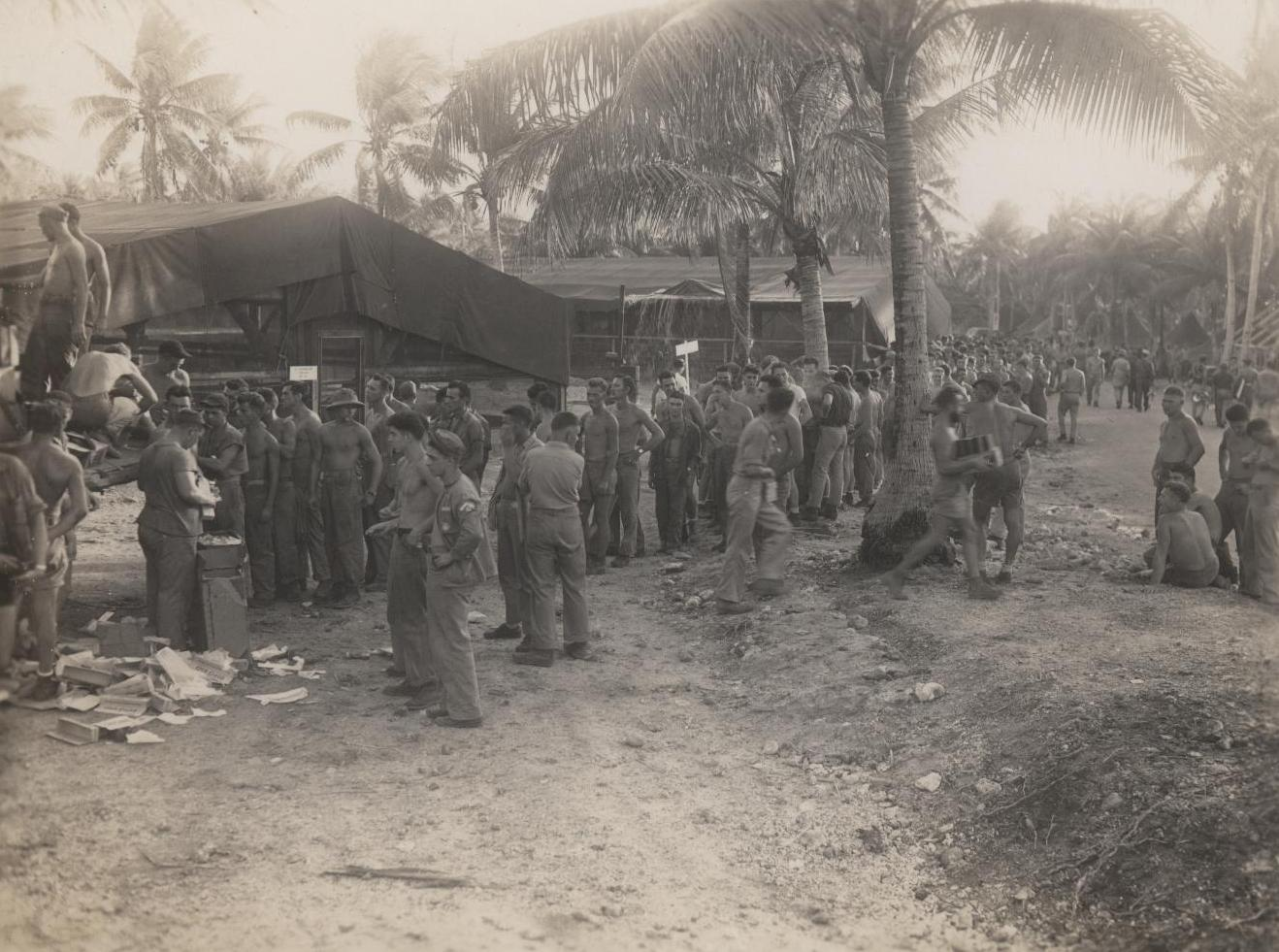
Mail Call at Ulithi in 1944

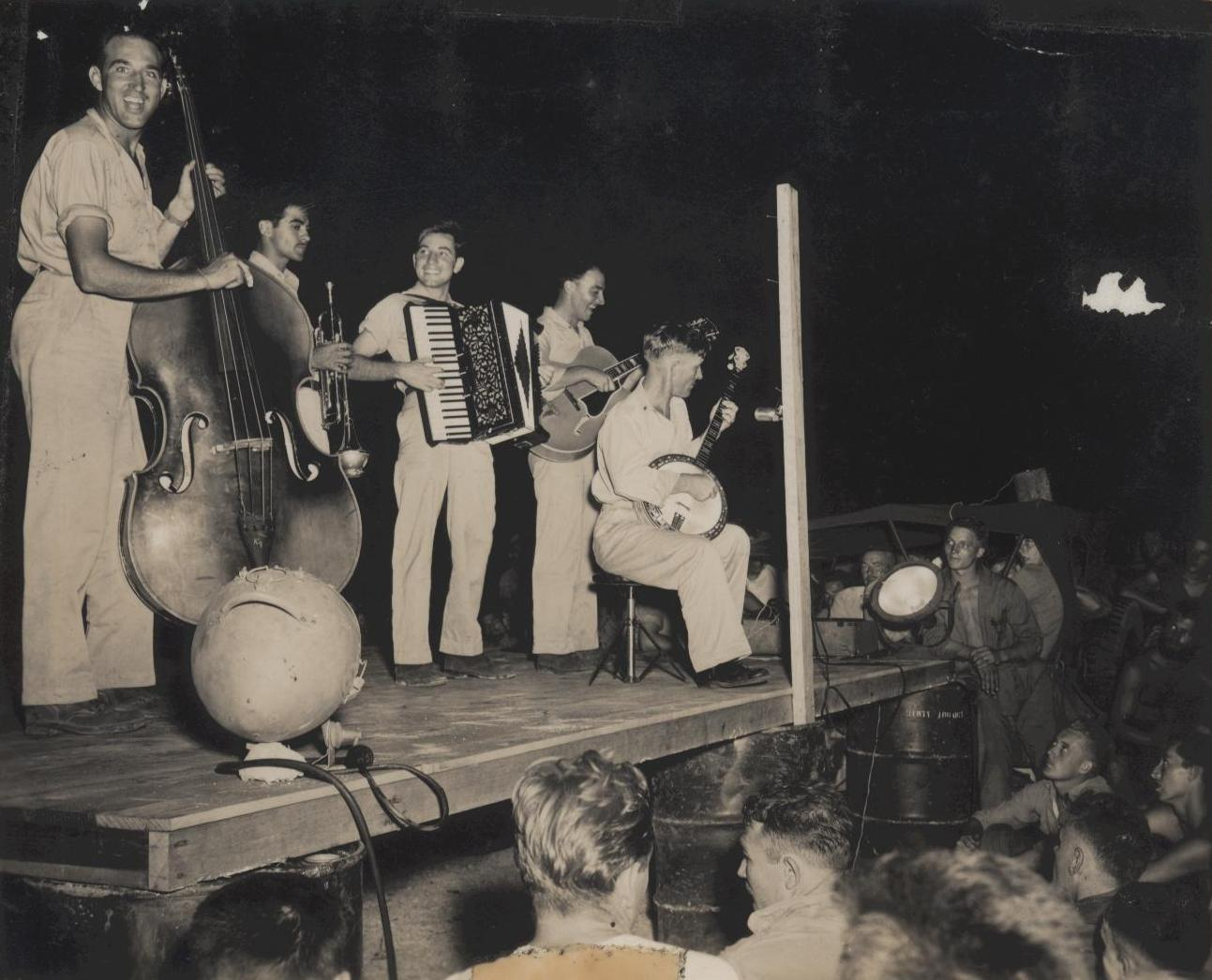
Tune Toppers perform for Troops at Ulithi in 1944

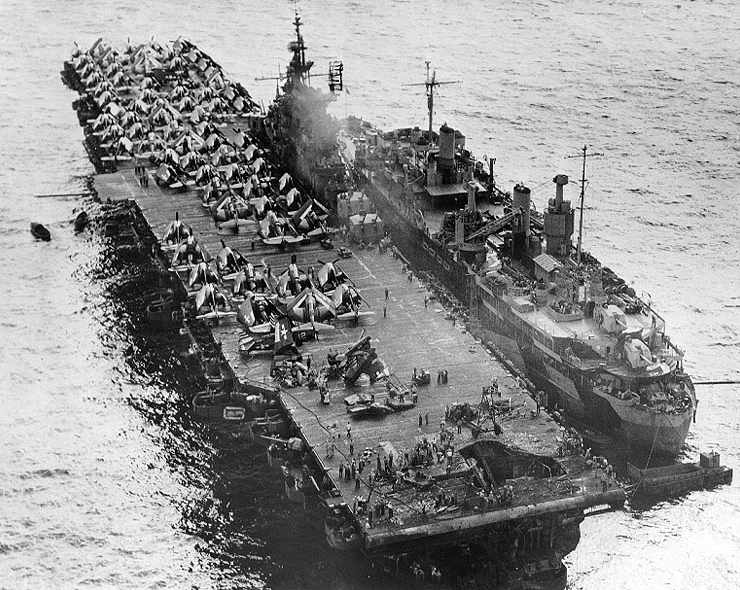
USS Randolph (CV-15) under repair at Ulithi from USS Jason on 13 March 1945 after flight deck hit by kamikaze

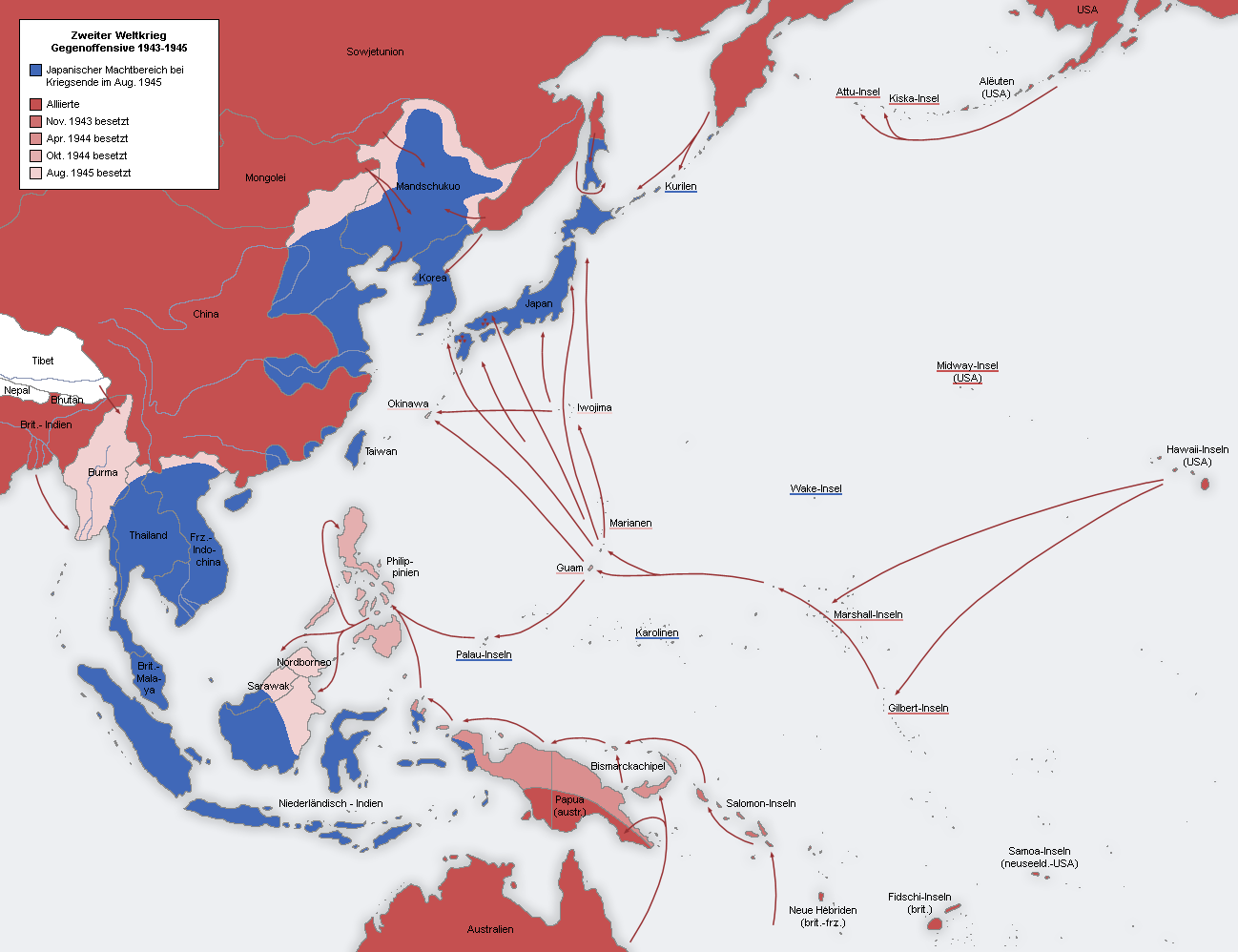
Second world war leapfrogging strategy 1943-1945 map

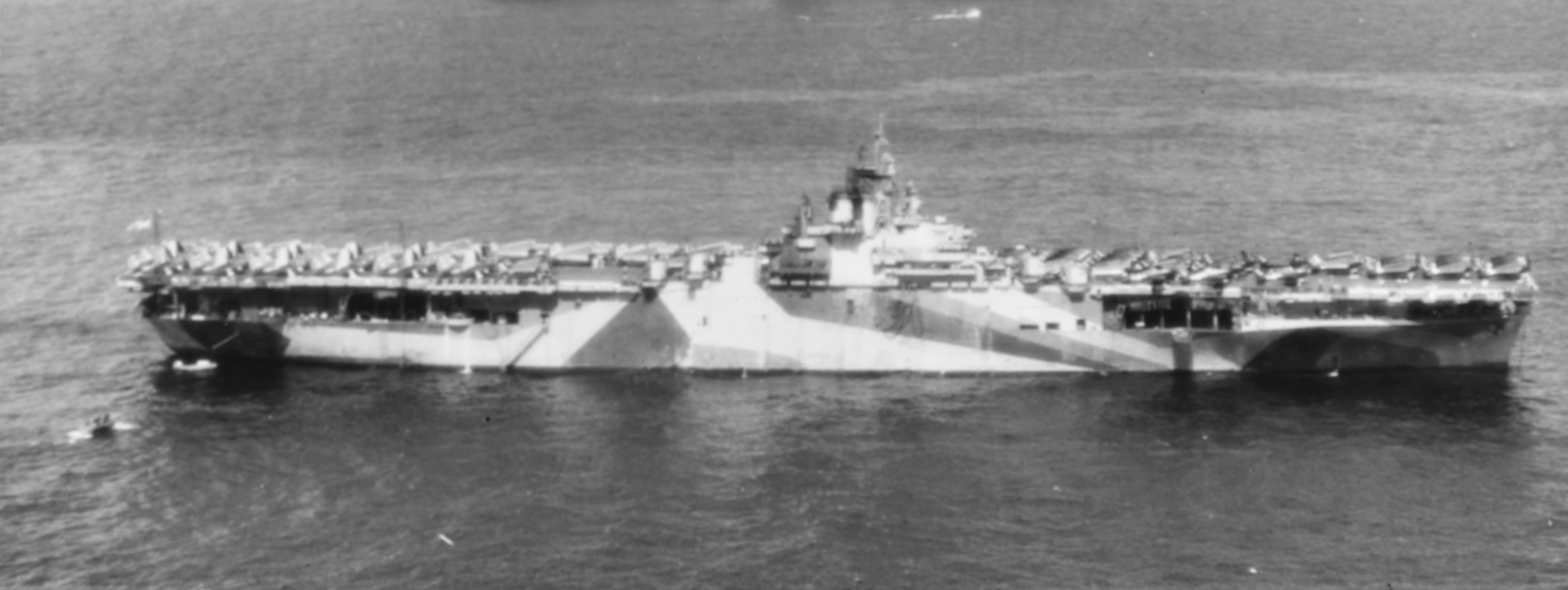
USS Wasp (CV-18) at anchor in Ulithi Atoll on 8 December 1944

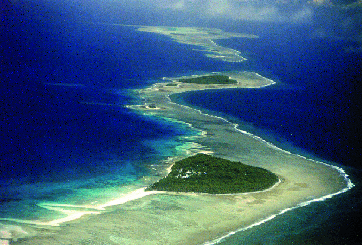
Ulithi atoll

Mogmog Island Ulithi fleet recreation center arrival dock in 1944

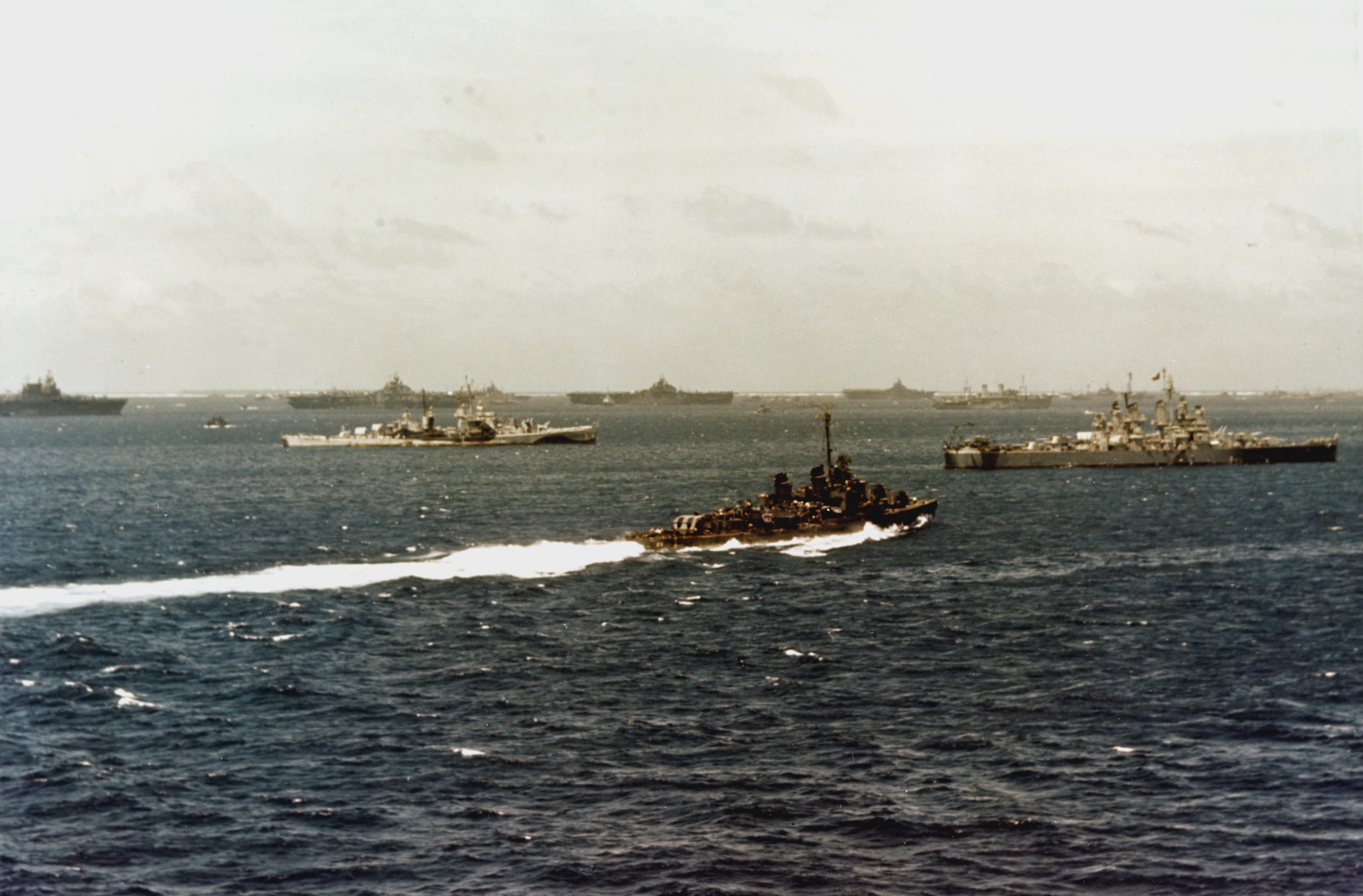
USS Shannon (DM-25) in Ulithi Atoll in March 1945

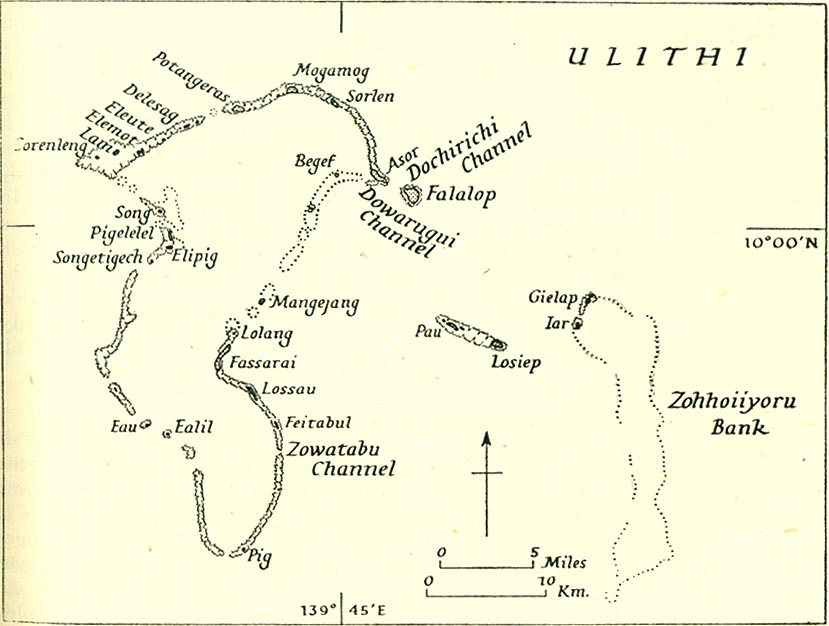
A mMap of Ulithi Atoll

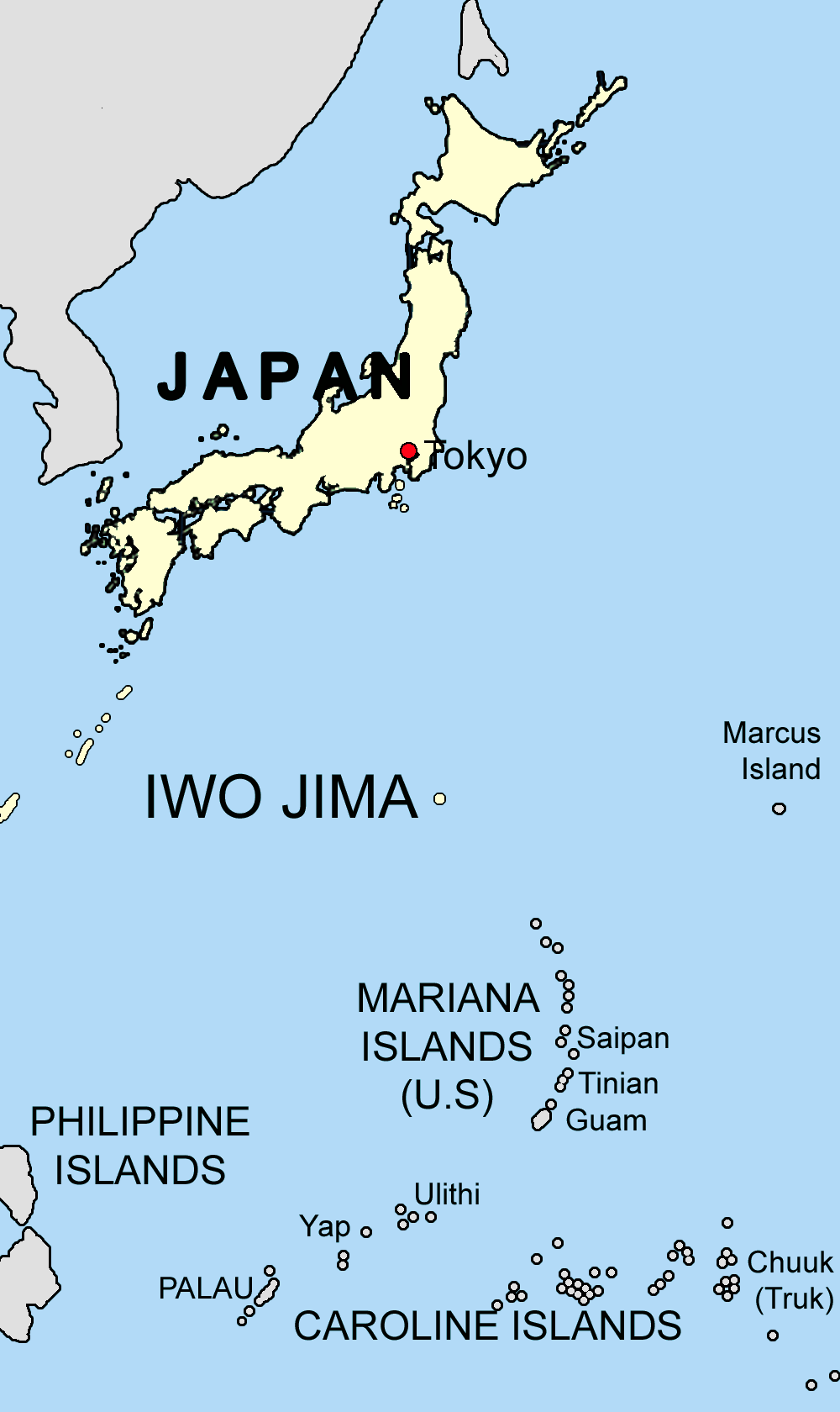
A map of Japan and the Caroline Islands

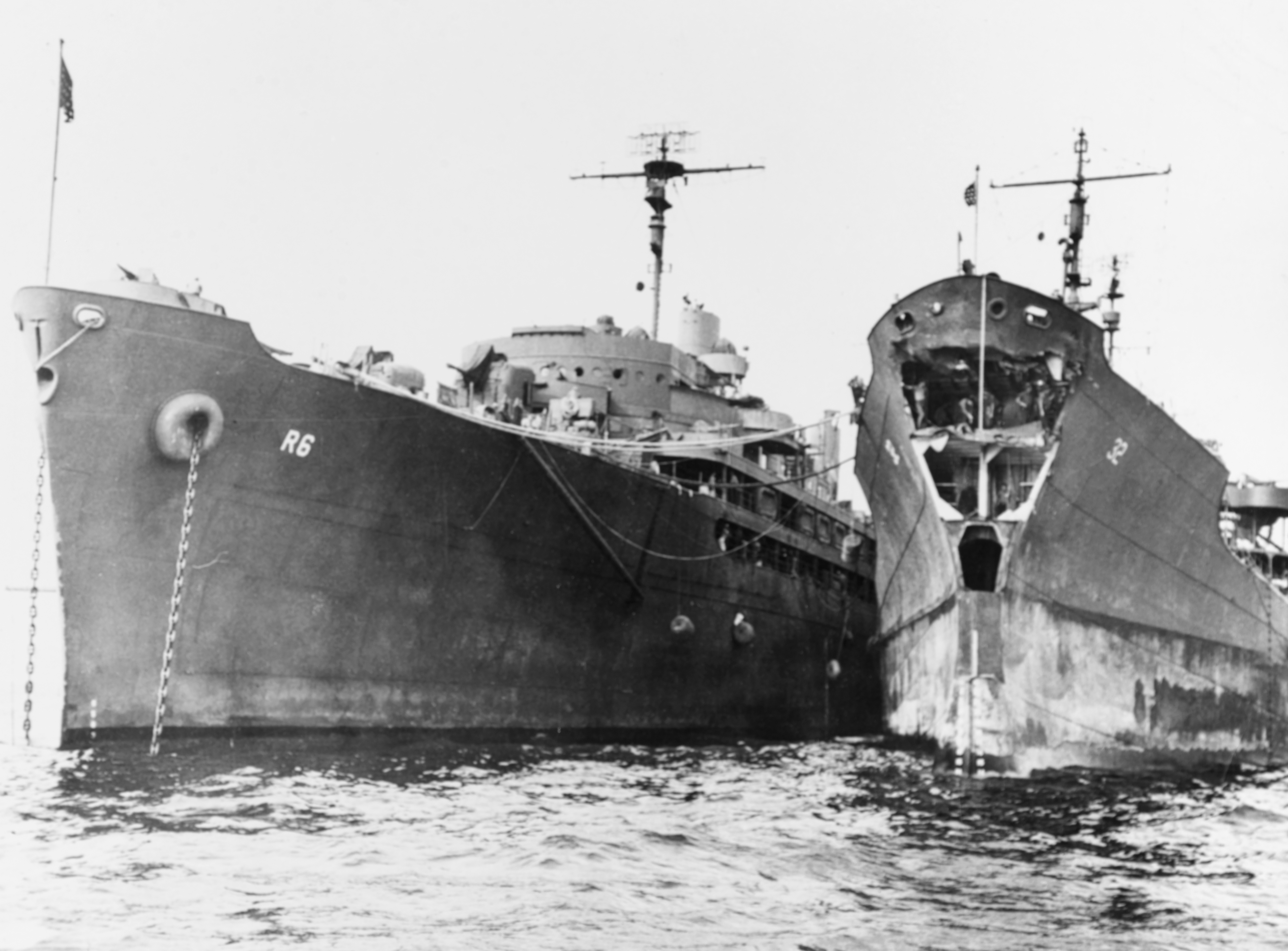
USS Ajax (AR-6) repairing USS Guadalupe (AO-32) at Ulithi on 9 February 1945

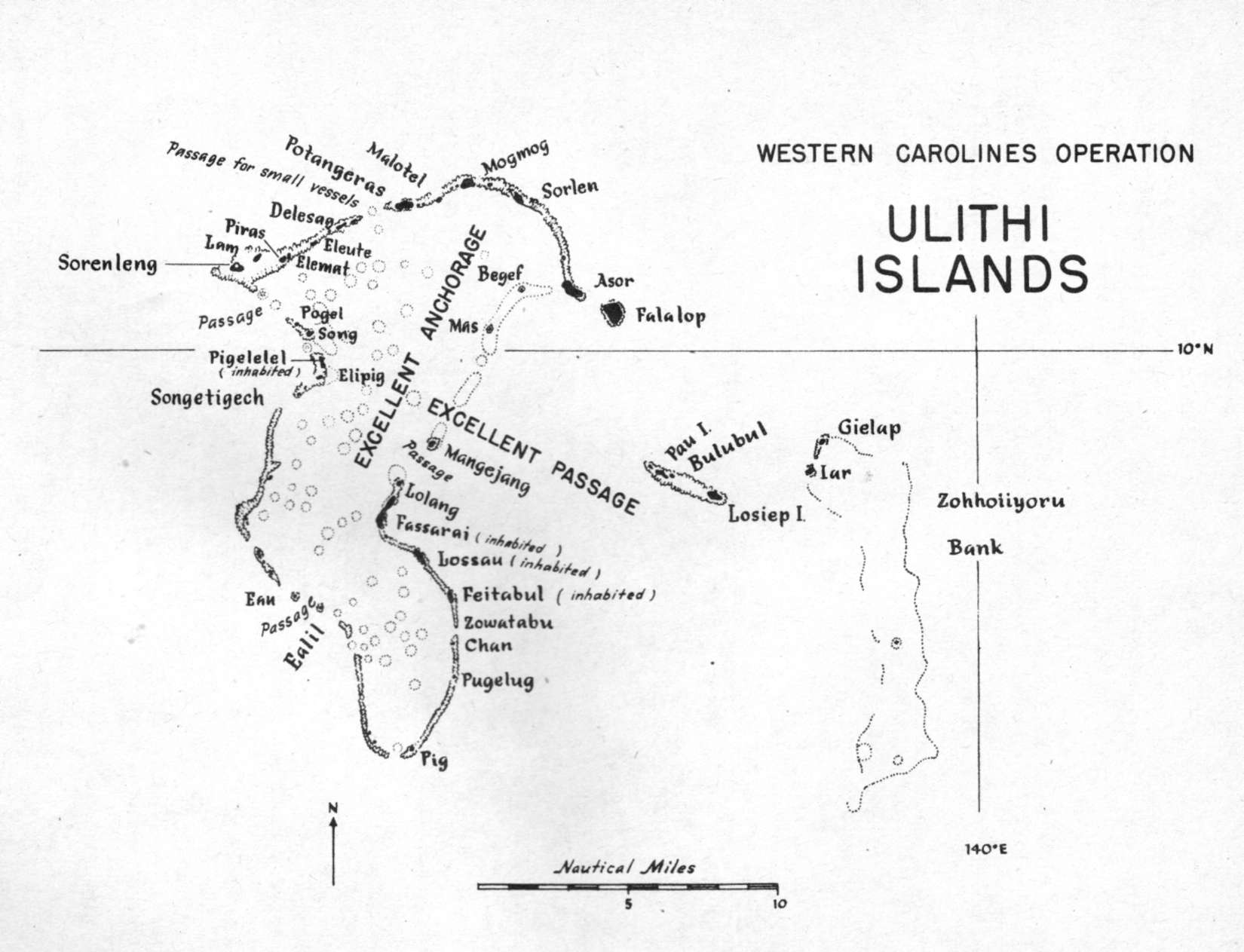
A 1944 map of Ulithi

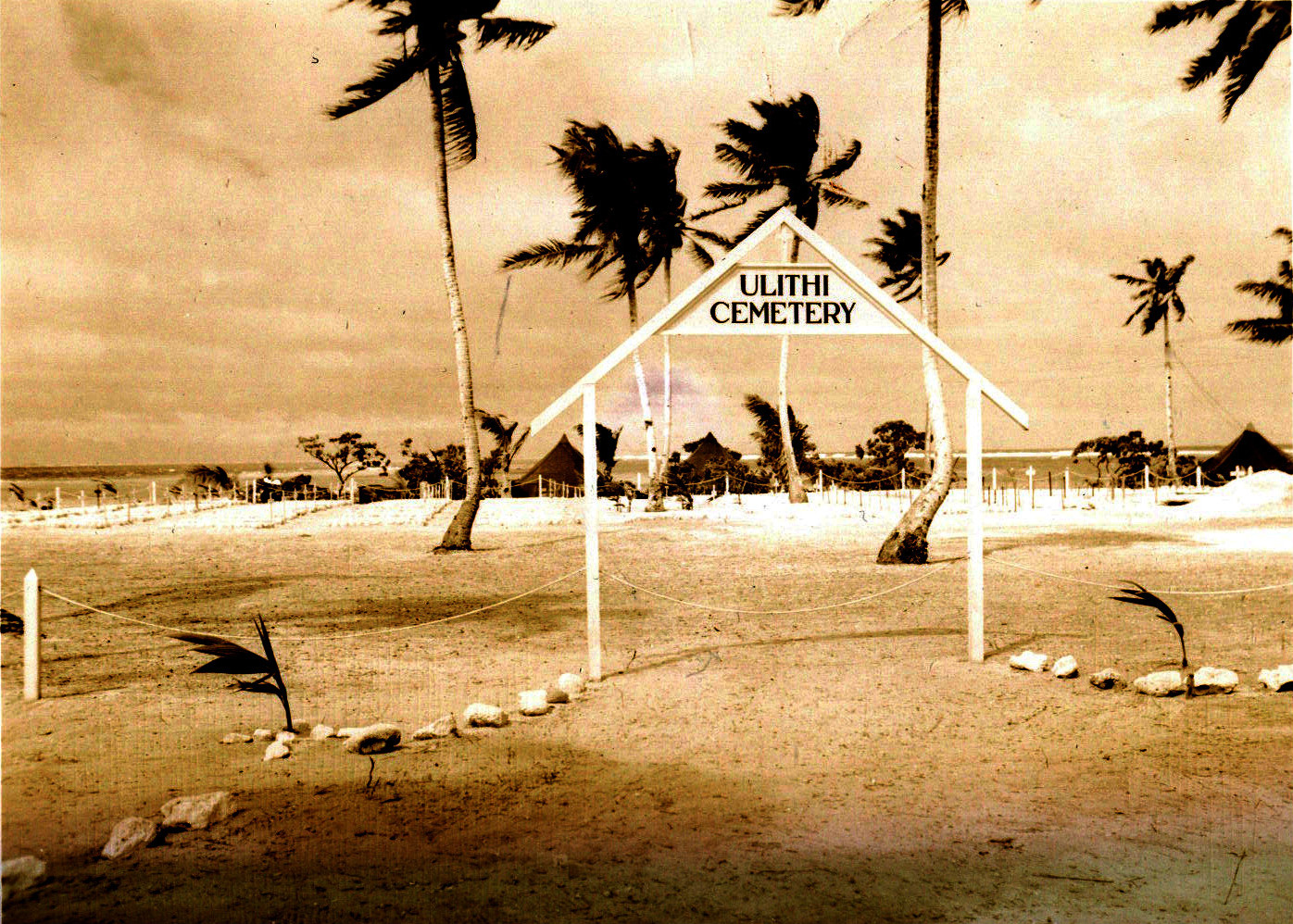
Ulithi Cemetery

The Ulithi LORAN station on Falalop, built in 1952.

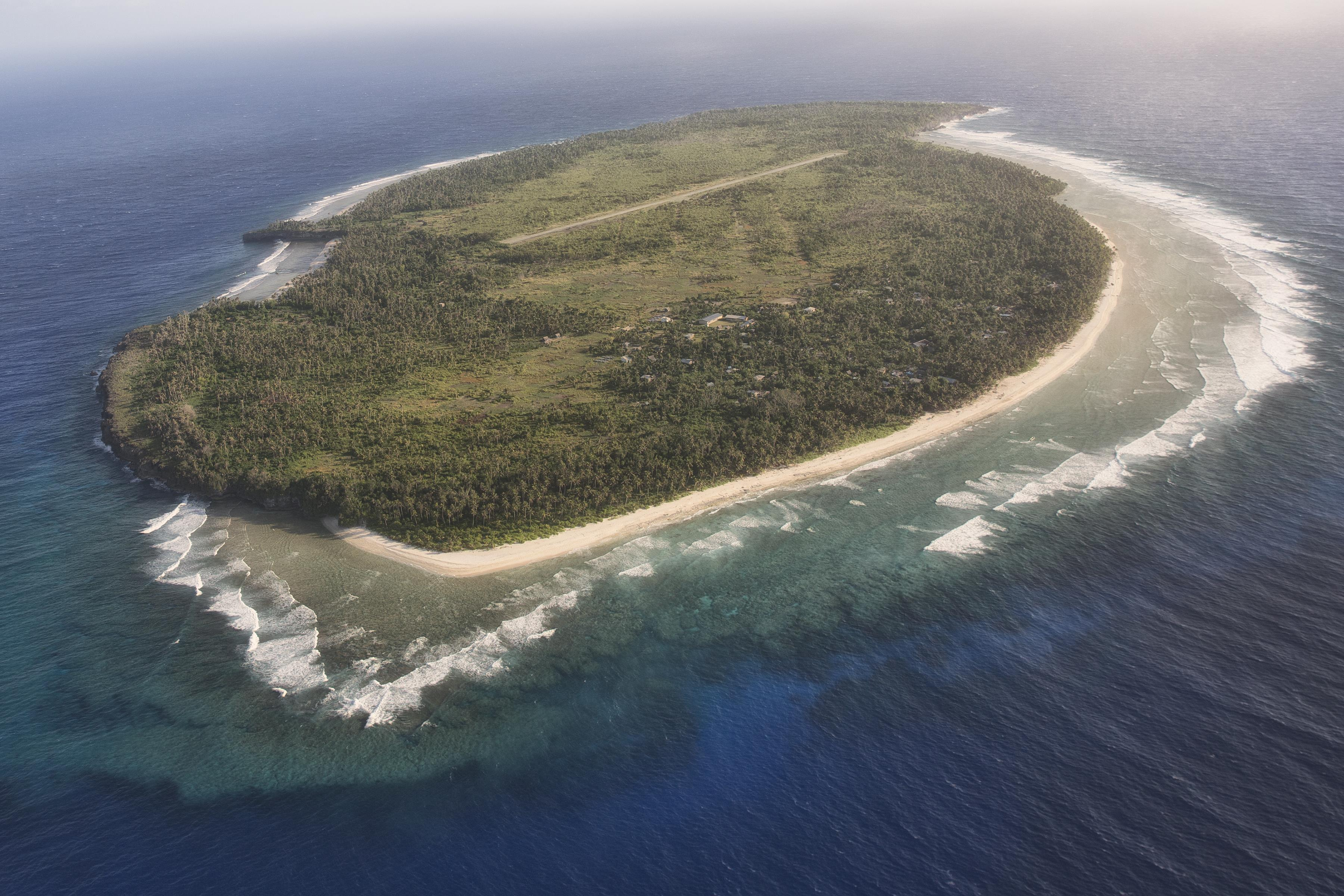
An aerial image of Fais Island and Naval Base Ulithi's Fais Airfield

The South Pacific islands in 1945

== See also ==
- US Naval Advance Bases
