= Operation Tan No. 2 =

1945 Japanese military operation in World War II

- Part of the Pacific Theater of World War II
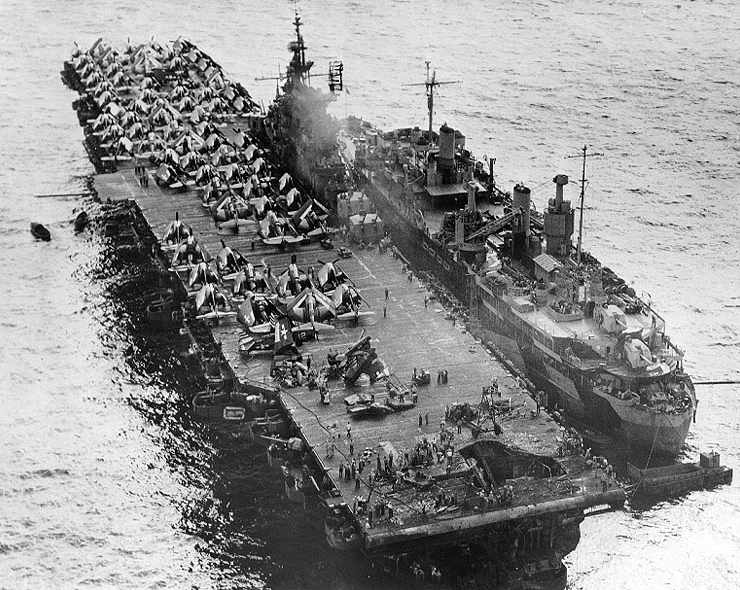
- USS Randolph alongside a repair ship at Ulithi Atoll in the Caroline Islands on 13 March 1945, showing damage to her after flight deck resulting from the kamikaze hit on 11 March.
Date	11 March 1945
Location	Ulithi in the western Pacific 10.0685°N 139.7296°E
Result	Inconclusive

Belligerents
United States	Japan

Commanders and leaders
(United States) Raymond A. Spruance	(Empire of Japan) Soemu Toyoda (Empire of Japan) Matome Ugaki (Empire of Japan) Naoto Kuromaru

Strength
15 aircraft carriers	2 submarines, 30 aircraft

Casualties and losses
1 aircraft carrier damaged, 26 killed and 105 wounded	13 aircraft destroyed 60-70 killed

Operation Tan No. 2 (Japanese: 第二次丹作戰, Dainiji Tan Sakusen) was a long-range kamikaze mission directed at the main Allied naval fleet anchorage at Ulithi Atoll in the western Pacific on 11 March 1945 during the Pacific campaign of World War II. The Japanese hoped to take the U.S. Pacific Fleet by surprise and sink or damage a significant number of the fleet's aircraft carriers or other large ships.

== Attack ==
The Azusa Special Attack Unit (Japanese: 梓特別攻撃隊), to which were allocated 24 "Yokosuka P1Y1" twin-engine bombers, took off from the Kanoya Air Field on Kyushu, the southernmost of the Japanese home islands. The aircraft were bound for the US Naval Base Ulithi on a one-way trip at the limits of their range in an attempt to destroy the Fifth Fleet carriers at anchor there. Each of the planes carried an 800 kg (1,700-pound) bomb, which they intended to deliver by crashing onto the flight decks. Support aircraft and submarines were used to help guide the attackers over their long flight.

Some six of the P1Y1s suffered mechanical difficulties and had to turn back to their home base at Kanoya. Others landed at Yap island. Still others had to ditch at sea. Two of the twenty-four aircraft reached Ulithi, arriving after nightfall and achieving complete surprise. One aircraft hit the Essex-class aircraft carrier USS Randolph in the stern just below the flight deck, killing 26 men and wounding 105, many of whom were watching a movie in the ship's hangar deck. The second aircraft crashed onto an access road on the small island of Sorlen, apparently mistaking the road with its nearby signal tower for a ship. There were no deaths in the attack beyond the aircraft's crew, though several servicemen were injured from debris and ignited fuel.

== Aftermath ==
Randolph was repaired at the port facilities available at Ulithi and rejoined the fleet in April 1945. She then took part in the Battle of Okinawa, where Admiral Marc Mitscher shifted his flag to her after kamikaze attacks successively knocked both USS Bunker Hill and USS Enterprise out of the battle.
