= USS Quartz =

1940s United States Navy barge

History

United States
- Name: USS Quartz
- Builder: Barrett and Hilp, Belair Shipyard, San Francisco, California
- Launched: 4 December 1943
- In service: 13 April 1944
- Out of service: 31 December 1946
- Stricken: 22 January 1947
- Fate: Sold, 23 October 1947; Permanently anchored as a breakwater

General characteristics
- Class & type: Trefoil-class cargo barge
- Displacement: 10,970 long tons (11,146 t)
- Length: 360 ft (110 m)
- Beam: 54 ft (16 m)
- Draft: 26 ft (7.9 m)
- Propulsion: None
- Speed: Not self-propelled
- Complement: 52 officers and men

USS Quartz (IX-150), a Trefoil-class concrete barge designated an unclassified miscellaneous vessel, was the only ship of the United States Navy to be named for quartz or silicon dioxide (SiO_{2}) a hard, vitreous mineral occurring in many varieties and comprising 12% of the Earth's crust. Her keel was laid down as MC hull 1330 by Barrett and Hilp, Belair Shipyard, San Francisco, California (T. B7.D1). She was launched on 4 December 1943, and accepted by the Navy and placed in service on 13 April 1944 under command of Lt. Cdr. P. M. Runyon.

== Service history ==
=== World War II, 1944–1945 ===
Designed to provide facilities for the issuance of stores at advanced bases, Quartz was assigned to the Service Force, Pacific Fleet (ComServPac). She was towed to Pearl Harbor from San Francisco, arriving on 10 May 1944. Operating with Service Squadrons 8 and 10, she was typical of the "Green Dragons" or "Crockery" ships, which acted as warehouses afloat and packed every conceivable supply item within their holds. She provided services at Majuro, Eniwetok, Ulithi, Leyte and Guam.

Quartz specialized in the handling of clothing, together with general stores. High speed provision ships made runs to the far reaches of the Pacific, transferred their cargoes to the "crockery" ships, and then returned to the United States for another load without awaiting piecemeal discharge of their cargoes.

=== Post-war activities and fate, 1945–1947 ===
After V-J Day Quartz was assigned to support "Operation Crossroads", atomic bomb testing. Quartz was part of Task Group 1 and 8, a supply and support group to the testing. After the detonation Quartz was towed to Kwajalein for study and monitoring. After verifying her free of radioactive contamination, the Navy sold her on 11 August 1947 to Foss Launch & Tug Company. In 1956 she was sold to the Powell River Company, where she was permanently anchored with nine other hulls to form a breakwater protecting the Catalyst Paper mill log pond in Powell River, British Columbia.
