= USS PGM-18 =

Gunboat of the United States Navy

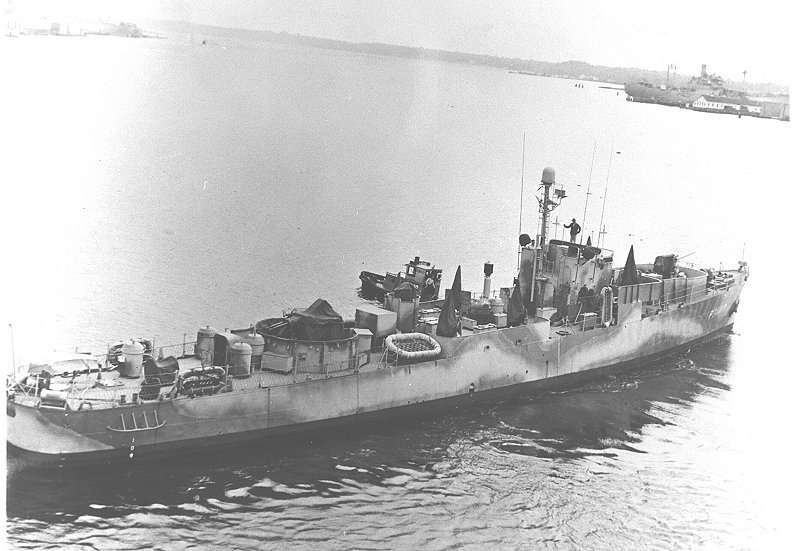
- USS PGM-17

History

United States
- Name: USS PC-1255
- Builder: Luders Marine Construction Co., Stamford, Connecticut
- Laid down: 29 September 1943
- Launched: 23 January 1944
- Commissioned: 1 September 1944
- Decommissioned: October 1944
- Renamed: USS PGM-18
- Recommissioned: 18 December 1944
- Honors and awards: 1 battle star for the Battle of Okinawa
- Fate: Sunk by mine, 8 April 1945

General characteristics
- Class & type: PC-461-class submarine chaser
- Reclassified: PGM-9-class gunboat, late 1944
- Displacement: 280 tons (light), 450 tons (full)
- Length: 173 ft. 8 in.
- Beam: 23 ft.
- Draft: 10 ft. 10 in.
- Propulsion: two 2,560bhp Hooven-Owen-Rentschler RB-99DA diesel engines, Westinghouse single reduction gear, two shafts
- Speed: 22 knots
- Complement: 65
- Armament: 1 × 3 in (76 mm)/50 cal; 1 × 40 mm gun; 3 × 20 mm cannons; 2 × depth charge throwers; 2 × depth charge tracks

USS PGM-18 was a PGM-9-class motor gunboat built for the United States Navy during World War II. She was built and originally commissioned as USS PC-1255, a PC-461-class submarine chaser, and was decommissioned and converted in late 1944. USS PGM-18 struck a mine off the coast of Okinawa in April 1945; 13 men lost their lives when PGM-18 sank.

== Career ==
PC-1255 was built by the Luders Marine Construction Company in Stamford, Connecticut. She was laid down on 29 September 1943 and launched on 23 January 1944. She was commissioned as USS PC-1255 on 1 September 1944. She was decommissioned in October 1944 and converted into a gunboat at the Dade Dry Docks Shipyard in Miami, Florida. She was recommissioned as USS PGM-18 on 18 December 1944. She was destroyed on 7 April 1945 after striking a mine and foundering off the coast of Okinawa during the Battle of Okinawa.

After being commissioned as USS PC-1255, the subchaser received her captain, Lieutenant John C. Bigham Jr., USNR. She spent the first month of duty receiving her crew, bringing on supplies, and being inspected and inventoried. On 16 September 1944, she set sail for the Naval Training Center in Miami, Florida, arriving there on the 19th. The next day PC-1255 received orders to report to the Dade Dry Docks Shipyard to undergo conversion from a submarine chaser into a patrol gunboat. Her submarine hunting technology and antisubmarine weapons were replaced with six 20 mm, one twin 40 mm, and one twin .50 cal (12.7 mm) machine guns and a 60mm mortar. She was decommissioned in October 1944 at the start of the conversion and recommissioned as USS PGM-18 when the conversion was finished on 18 December 1944.

=== Marshall and Mariana Island chains ===
With her conversion complete, PGM-18 returned to the Naval Training Center to undergo shakedown training. The training lasted for two straight weeks of intense drills and exercises, excluding Christmas Day and New Year's Day. With her training complete she spent the next several days getting her hull scrubbed clean and repainted. On 17 January 1945 she set out for San Diego, California via the Panama Canal, arriving there on 2 February. PGM-18 spent several days resupplying before dispatching to Pearl Harbor, Hawaii, arriving there on 14 February. While at Pearl Harbor, the ship's captain, Lieutenant Bigham, broke his ankle and was replaced with Lieutenant Cyril Bayley, USNR. On 26 February, she set out for Eniwetok Atoll with fellow gunboat, USS PGM-29.

On 28 February 1945, an unidentified ship approaching the pair of gunboats at an overtaking parallel course opened fire, firing two rounds which fell short. The unknown ship reversed course and attempts to contact her failed. PGM-18 monitored a radio message reporting a sighting of a submarine. PGM-18 proceeded to send out a message reporting that the submarine sighting was false and that they had been mistaken for a submarine. Due to the low profile of PGM gunboats and PC submarine chasers it was not uncommon for them to be misidentified as a submarine. Later, the same ship overtook them and was revealed to be US Army freighter, SS Minot Victory.

=== Struck by SS John G. Tod ===
On 6 March 1945, the two gunboats arrived at Eniwetok. While anchored, PGM-29 was accidentally struck by Liberty ship SS John G. Tod. While she underwent repairs, PGM-18 proceeded without her to Guam and then to Ulithi.

=== Battle of Okinawa ===
After a week of shoreleave, she proceeded to Kerama Retto, Ryukyu Islands with a group of YMS-1 class minesweepers. Throughout heavy kamikaze attacks during the Battle of Okinawa, PGM-18 and the minesweepers successfully cleaned up Japanese mines at Kerama Retto and off the west coast of Okinawa. The minesweepers turned their attention to the waters of Nakagusuku Bay.

=== Sunk by mine ===
PGM-18, while following behind YMS-103 and destroying mines she and other minesweepers cut loose, struck and detonated a mine. Eyewitnesses on nearby ships reported that the explosion was so powerful they could see five feet of sunlight under her keel before she came back down into the water, rolled over, and then foundered. YMS-103, in an attempt to rescue survivors, struck two mines, blowing off her bow and stem. Despite this, she was able to remain afloat. PGM-18 suffered two dead, twelve missing and 14 wounded, and YMS-103 suffered five killed and seven wounded. The survivors were picked up by other ships in the area. PGM-18 was only in service for 111 days before her destruction and received a battle star for her involvement in the Battle of Okinawa.
