= USS Trefoil (IX-149) =

American cargo barge

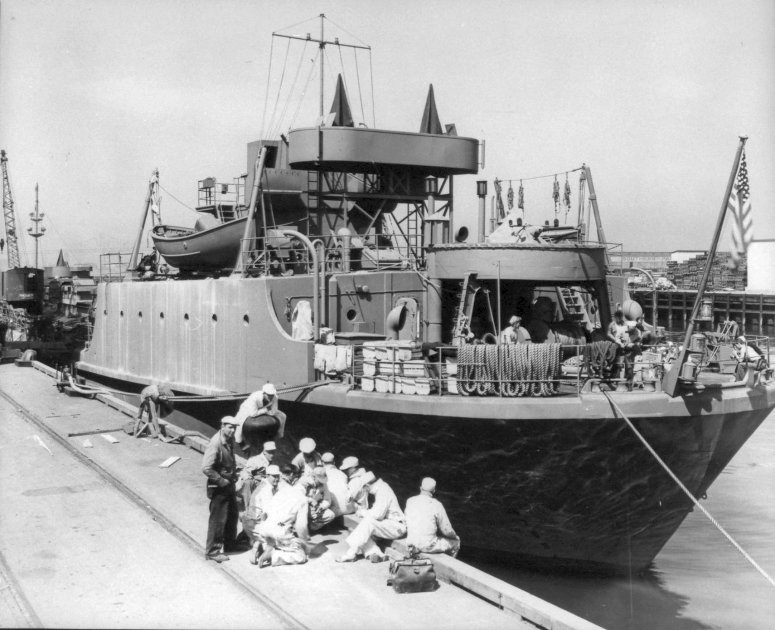
- Midnight in March 1944

History

United States
- Name: USS Midnight
- Builder: Barrett, Hilp & Belair, San Francisco, California
- Laid down: 1943
- Launched: November 1943
- Acquired: 5 March 1944
- In service: 9 March 1944
- Out of service: 28 May 1948
- Renamed: Trefoil, 10 June 1944
- Stricken: 22 December 1948
- Fate: Sold, 1948

General characteristics
- Class & type: Trefoil-class cargo barge
- Displacement: 10,960 long tons (11,136 t)
- Length: 366 ft 4 in (111.66 m)
- Beam: 54 ft (16 m)
- Propulsion: None
- Speed: Not self-propelled
- Complement: 54 officers and men
- Armament: 1 × 40 mm AA gun; 4 × single 20 mm AA guns

USS Trefoil (IX-149), the lead ship of her class of concrete-hulled cargo barge, was the second ship of the United States Navy to be given that name. Her keel was laid down in 1943 under a Maritime Commission contract (MC hull 1329) by the Barrett, Hilp & Belair Shipyard in San Francisco, California (Type B7-D1). She was acquired by the Navy on 5 March 1944 as Midnight (the second ship of that name), designated unclassified miscellaneous vessel IX-149, and placed in service on 9 March 1944 with Lieutenant Neal King, USNR, in charge.

== Service history ==
=== World War II, 1944–1945 ===
Midnight completed conversion for Navy use on 28 March and was assigned to the Service Force, Pacific Fleet. That same day, she was towed out of San Francisco, California, on her way to the Central Pacific. After a stop at Pearl Harbor, she continued her voyage and arrived in Majuro Lagoon on 4 May. For the next five months, she served at Majuro and Eniwetok. During that time, she was renamed Trefoil on 10 June 1944.

On 5 October, Current (ARS-22) towed her out of Eniwetok and on to Ulithi where she arrived on 16 October. She remained there for ten months on duty with Service Squadron 8. In August 1945, she was towed from Ulithi to Leyte in the Philippines where she arrived on 28 August. Trefoil remained there until 9 November, when she was towed out for Guam in the Mariana Islands. The barge reached Apra Harbor on 16 November.

=== Post-war activities, 1945–1948 ===
Trefoil served at Guam for the remainder of her Navy career. Early in 1946, she was chosen as one of the support ships for "Operation Crossroads", the atomic bomb tests conducted at Bikini Atoll that summer. However, soon thereafter, that decision was rescinded and another made to dispose of her. Action on that decision was also deferred, and she was used to house Stockton-Pollack employees building a drydock in Apra Harbor. Her reprieve ended in September 1947 when she was determined to be in excess of the needs of the Navy.

=== Disposal ===
On 28 May 1948, the barge was turned over to the Foreign Liquidations Commission of the United States Department of State for disposal, and she was sold to the Asia Development Corporation of Shanghai, China. Her name was struck from the Naval Vessel Register on 22 December 1948. The barge, however, remained at Apra Harbor because she was impounded due to a dispute over ownership of the vessel between the Asia Development Corporation and Moellers, Limited, of Hong Kong. The dispute must have been resolved in favour of Mollers, because in 1951, she was in their service having been renamed ‘Autumn Light’.

In 1952, she was transferred to Hong Kong Salvage and Towage. On 26th November 1954 she was present at Tsuen Wan, Hong Kong, but by 1959, deemed to be ‘Out of Service’ Her ultimate fate and location are not known.
