= J. N. McCammon Shipyard =

WWI-era emergency shipyard in Texas

The J. N. McCammon Shipyard (EFC Yard #45) was an emergency American shipyard in Beaumont, Texas active from 1917 to 1918..

== History ==
The shipyard was established in 1917 by government contractor J.N. McCammon to construct wood-hulled Design 1001 "Ferris-type" cargo steamships for the Emergency Fleet Corporation (EFC) during World War I. The yard, consisting of two ways, was located on the east side of the Neches River. The yard joined the Lone Star Shipbuilding Company and the McBride & Law shipyard as recent additions to the Beaumont shipbuilding industry. The operation was shuttered following the 1918 Armistice after federal wooden vessel contracts were terminated. The physical waterfront site was later integrated into the Bethlehem Beaumont Shipyard complex.

== Shipbuilding production ==
The facility was assigned two primary government contracts covering four unique hull numbers. The yard structurally completed the Design 1001 wooden cargo vessel Hasbe (EFC Hull No. 328) and launched the sister hull Cambodia although Cambodia was never officially documented before the yard ceased its operations. Two subsequent contracts for planned Design 1067 wooden vessels (EFC Hull Nos. 2741 and 2742) were permanently cancelled by the United States Shipping Board on January 18, 1919 before construction officially cleared administrative approval.

Ships Built by the J. N. McCammon shipyard in Beaumont, Texas
Image	Hull	Ship Name	Design	O/N Number	Owner	Type	Gross tonnage	Launched	Completed	Notes and disposition
	328	SS Hasbe	1001		US Shipping Board	Cargo Ship	3,500	9 Sep 1919	27 Oct 1919	
	329	SS Cambodia	1001		US Shipping Board	Cargo Ship	3,500	6 Nov 1919	26 Nov 1919	
