= Lucidor (disambiguation) =

Lucidor is the pen name of Swedish baroque poet Lars "Lasse" Johansson (1638 – 1674).

Lucidor can also mean:

- USS Lucidor (AF-45), a US Navy ship used during World War II
- 1176 Lucidor, an asteroid
