= George F. Rodgers Shipbuilding Company =

Shipyard in Astoria, Oregon, U.S.

The George F. Rodgers Shipbuilding Company was a shipbuilder located in Astoria, Oregon.

== History ==
The shipyard was incorporated on August 6, 1917 by George F. Rodgers (former mayor of Salem, Oregon), C.A. Koppison, and L.E. Rolfe who took a five year lease out on a dock in Astoria, Oregon. The shipyard was located on 7.5 acres at the mouth of the Columbia River between the Port of Astoria to the northeast and the Spokane, Portland and Seattle Railway to the south. It included 4 berths of 300 feet in length with launching ways extending 210 feet, a blacksmith shop, sawmill, and joiner shop. In August 1917, due to a shortage of merchant shipping during World War I, the shipyard was awarded a contract to build four 3,500-ton Design 1001 cargo ships by the Emergency Fleet Corporation (EFC). The ships were often referred as "Ferris"-type due to their design by naval architect Theodore E. Ferris. The facility was operating on October 1, 1917 and the first keel was laid later in the month. The SS Blue Eagle was completed in 1918 followed by the SS Capines, SS Wohnabe, and SS Munra in 1919. The shipyard was awarded contracts to build 4 more Design 1001 ships at a bid of $300,000 per ship. Construction commenced on two hulls (Granon, Crantor) before the EFC cancelled the contracts due to the end of World War I. The unfinished hulls became the subject of litigation after the Port of Astoria bought out the remainder of the lease to the Rodgers shipyard in order to build a multi-million dollar import-export pier. In January 1920, the company agreed to purchase all the remaining unfinished hulls (34 in total) commissioned by the EFC in the United States for $170,000. The company subsequently arranged a deal with the EFC to take over the Seattle shipyard of Skinner & Eddy which was ceasing operations but withdrew from the agreement in May 1920. In September 1924, Rodgers was killed in a plane crash at the Oregon State Fair and the company was dissolved.

Ships Built by the George F. Rodgers Shipbuilding Company in Astoria, Oregon
Image	Hull	Ship Name	Design	O/N Number	Owner	Type	Gross tonnage	Delivery Date	Disposition
		S.S. Blue Eagle	1001	217181	US Shipping Board	Cargo Ship	2,559	1918	sold to Western Marine & Salvage Company, September 1922; broken up 1924/1925 at their Portland, Oregon yard
		S.S. Capines	1001	217747	US Shipping Board	Cargo Ship	2,559	1919	sold to Western Marine & Salvage Company, September 1922; broken up 1924/1925 at their Portland, Oregon yard
		S.S. Wohnabe	1001	218366	US Shipping Board	Cargo Ship	2,559	1919	Burnt October 1920 in the Thames River (UK)
		S.S. Munra	1001	218367	US Shipping Board	Cargo Ship	2,559	1919	sold to Western Marine & Salvage Company, September 1922; broken up 1924/1925 at their Portland, Oregon yard
