= USS Howorth =

Fletcher-class destroyer

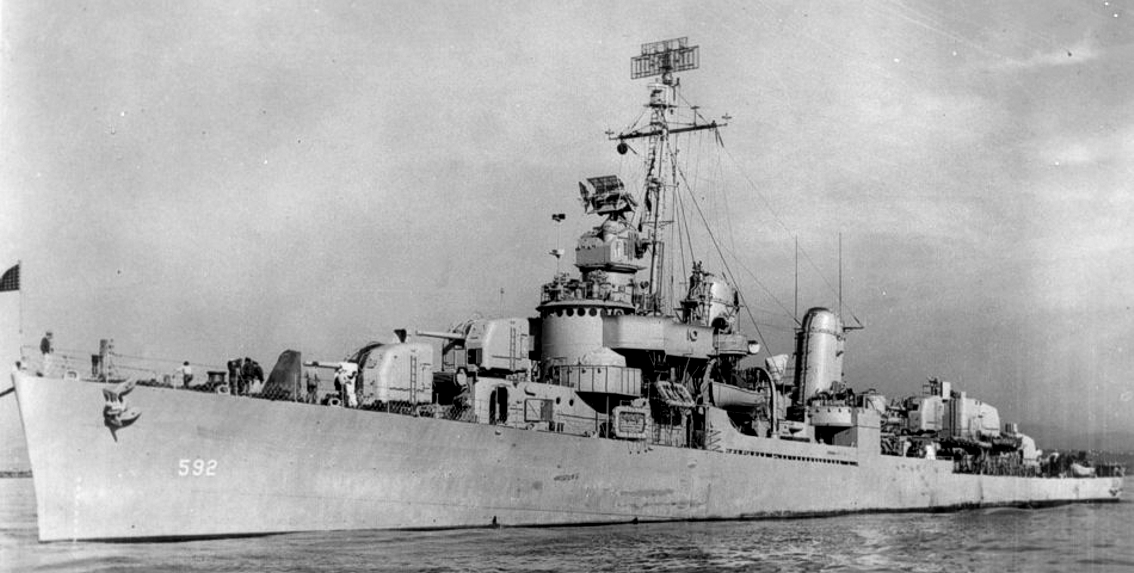
- Howorth circa 1945

History

United States
- Name: USS Howorth
- Builder: Puget Sound Naval Shipyard
- Laid down: 26 November 1941
- Launched: 10 January 1943
- Commissioned: 3 April 1944
- Decommissioned: 30 April 1946
- Identification: DD-592
- Fate: Sunk as target 8 March 1962

General characteristics
- Class & type: Fletcher-class destroyer
- Displacement: 2,050 tons
- Length: 376 ft 5 in (114.73 m)
- Beam: 39 ft 7 in (12.07 m)
- Draft: 17 ft 9 in (5.41 m)
- Propulsion: 60,000 shp (45 MW); geared turbines; 2 propellers
- Speed: 38 knots (70 km/h; 44 mph)
- Range: 6,500 nautical miles at 15 kt; (12,000 km at 30 km/h)
- Complement: 329 officers and enlisted
- Armament: 5 × 5 in (127 mm) DP guns, 10 × 40 mm AA guns, 7 × 20 mm AA guns, 10 × 21 inch (533 mm) torpedo tubes, 6 × depth charge projectors, 2 × depth charge tracks

USS Howorth (DD-592) was a Fletcher-class destroyer built for the United States Navy during World War II.

== Namesake ==
William L. Howorth was born on 16 July 1841 in Massachusetts. He was appointed Acting Master's Mate on 29 April 1863. Attached to Monticello, a blockader off North Carolina, he accompanied Lieutenant William B. Cushing on a reconnaissance up the Cape Fear River to Wilmington, North Carolina 23–24 June 1864, gaining valuable information about Confederate defenses. Later in the year, he joined Cushing's expedition up the Roanoke River to sink Confederate ram CSS Albemarle. The ram was destroyed 27 October, but the launch carrying the Union sailors was destroyed. Cushing and one other man escaped, while Howorth and others were captured. In his report Cushing noted: "Acting Master's Mate William L. Howorth, of the Monticello, showed, as usual conspicuous bravery." He was promoted to Acting Master and exchanged in February 1865. Honorably discharged in October, he reentered the Navy in 1866 and was appointed Ensign on 12 March 1868. He resigned from the Navy on 4 April 1869.

== Construction and commissioning ==
She was laid down on 26 November 1941, launched on 10 January 1943, and commissioned on 3 April 1944 at Puget Sound Naval Shipyard in Bremerton, Washington. She was the 161st ship of her class.

== World War II service ==
After a shakedown cruise, Howorth was assigned to Destroyer Squadron 21 (DesRon 21). The flotilla set sail on 22 July 1944, as part of the escort for a convoy carrying Marines to Pearl Harbor. The convoy arrived after seven days at sea, and Howorth remained in Hawaii until 25 August, at which point she sailed for Hollandia, along with the ammunition ship Sangay. Howorth was assigned to Destroyer Division 41 (DesDiv 41), of the 7th Fleet. Her first combat experience was in the Solomon Islands on anti-submarine and escort duty.

=== The Philippines ===
Howorth arrived off Leyte on 22 October, three days after the initial landings began. She guarded the transport anchorages during the Battle of Leyte Gulf, and did not see direct action during the battle. Howorth made several convoy trips to Kossol Roads, Guam, and Manus, before returning to the Philippines for the battle at Ormoc on 7 December 1944. Howorth also participated in the Battle of Mindoro, during which she was attacked by several kamikazes, one of which slightly damaged Howorth's mast before the plane crashed into the sea.

On 9 January 1945, the Invasion of Lingayen Gulf began. Howorth arrived with the first reinforcement group four days later on the 13th, which came under kamikaze attacks while en route. Howorth provided fire support to the invasion forces, provided anti-aircraft support for the invasion fleet, and patrolled the flanks of the fleet.

=== Iwo Jima ===
Howorth also took part in the invasion of Iwo Jima, arriving on 19 February. Howorth again provided fire support and anti-aircraft protection during the invasion and subsequent fighting on Iwo Jima. On 14 March, Howorth departed Iwo Jima for a short rest at Ulithi.

=== Okinawa ===
Howorth was assigned to screen a convoy from Ulithi bound for Okinawa, arriving on 1 April. After arrival at Okinawa, she again provided fire support and anti-aircraft defense. On her first day off Okinawa, Howorth was moving to her station with the cruiser St. Louis and destroyer Newcomb, when she was attacked by eight kamikazes. One made it through the ships' anti-aircraft fire and struck Howorth in her superstructure, killing seven men and causing a fire that was quickly put out.

Following the damage sustained at Okinawa, Howorth returned to the United States for repairs. She arrived at Mare Island Naval Shipyard in California on 2 May 1945. Repairs were completed by early July, and after a brief shakedown cruise in July, she set sail for Pearl Harbor on 15 July. The ship was en route to Adak, Alaska on 15 August, when the news of the Japanese surrender reached the ship.

=== Post-war ===
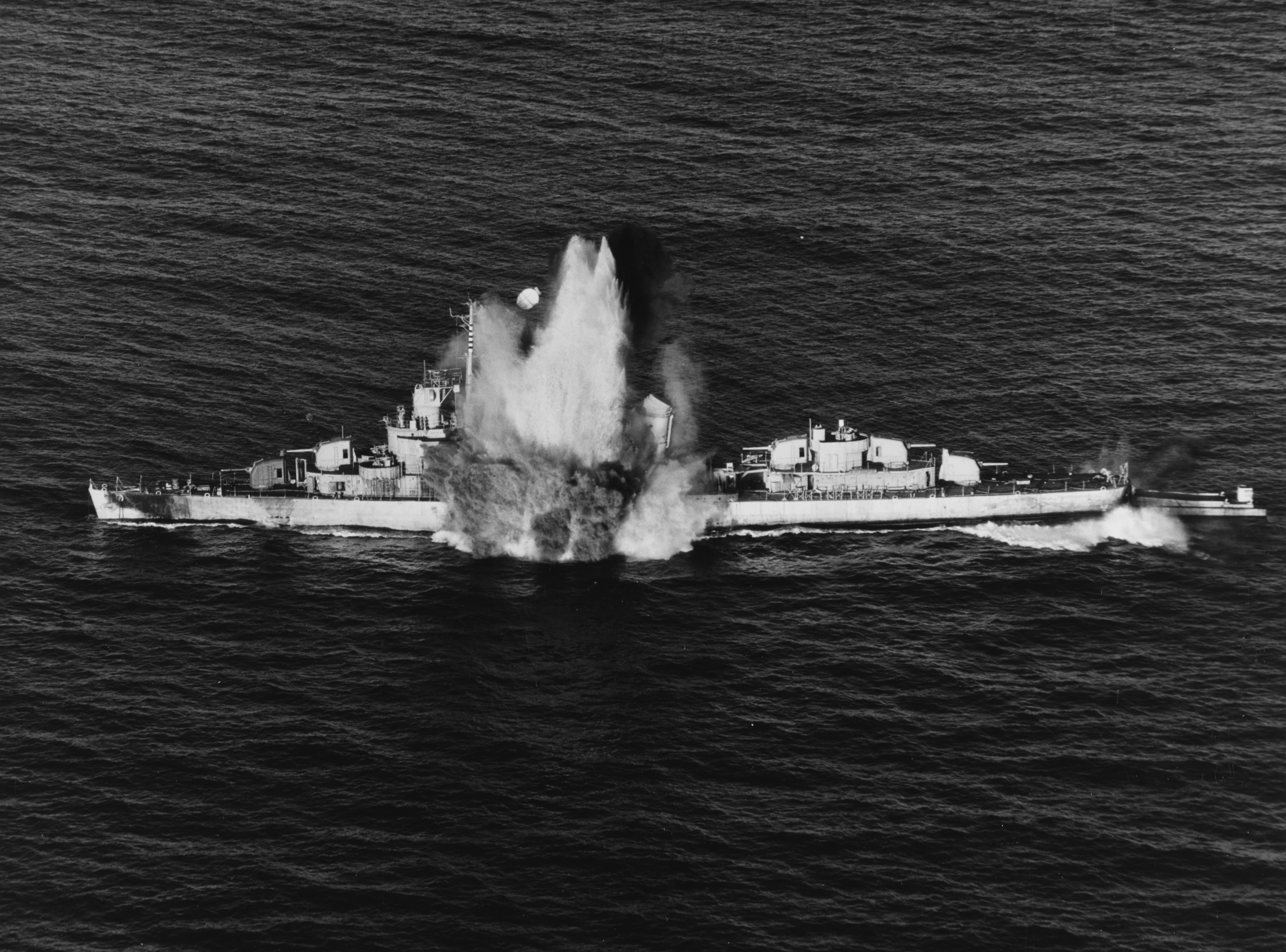
Howorth being sunk of San Clemente Island, 8 March 1962. The forward funnel cap can be seen blown into the air by the explosion.

Howorth arrived in Yokohama, Japan on 17 September, where she escorted convoys back from Japan. Her final trip from Japan was on 11 November, and arrived in San Francisco on the 28th of that month. The ship was decommissioned on 30 April 1946, and was placed in the Pacific Reserve Fleet. She remained in reserve until 8 March 1962 when she was sunk in the Pacific Ocean off San Clemente Island, California, as a torpedo target by the submarines USS Volador (SS-490) and USS Salmon (SS-573).

== Honors and awards ==
Howorth received five battle stars for her service during World War II.
