= USS Muscatine (AK-197) =

Cargo ship of the United States Navy

History

United States
- Name: Muscatine
- Namesake: Muscatine County, Iowa
- Ordered: as type (C1-M-AV1) hull, MC hull 2151
- Builder: Globe Shipbuilding Co., Superior, Wisconsin
- Yard number: 118
- Laid down: 21 December 1943
- Launched: 16 June 1944
- Sponsored by: Mrs. William Kennedy
- Acquired: 3 April 1945
- Commissioned: 19 April 1945
- Decommissioned: 7 March 1946
- Stricken: 20 March 1946
- Identification: Hull symbol: AK-197; Code letters: NEOM
- Fate: Sold, 24 February 1947

Norway
- Name: Palma
- Operator: J. Ludwig Moinckels Rederi
- Acquired: 24 February 1947
- Fate: Scrapped 1973

General characteristics
- Class & type: Alamosa-class cargo ship
- Type: C1-M-AV1
- Tonnage: 5,032 long tons deadweight (DWT)
- Displacement: 2,382 long tons (2,420 t) (standard); 7,450 long tons (7,570 t) (full load)
- Length: 388 ft 8 in (118.47 m)
- Beam: 50 ft (15 m)
- Draft: 21 ft 1 in (6.43 m)
- Installed power: 1 × Nordberg, TSM 6 diesel engine; 1,750 shp (1,300 kW)
- Propulsion: 1 × propeller
- Speed: 11.5 kn (21.3 km/h; 13.2 mph)
- Capacity: 3,945 t (3,883 long tons) DWT; 9,830 cu ft (278 m^{3}) (refrigerated); 227,730 cu ft (6,449 m^{3}) (non-refrigerated)
- Complement: 15 Officers; 70 Enlisted
- Armament: 1 × 3 in (76 mm)/50 caliber dual purpose gun (DP); 6 × 20 mm (0.8 in) Oerlikon anti-aircraft (AA) cannons

USS Muscatine (AK-197) was an Alamosa-class cargo ship that was constructed for the US Navy under a US Maritime Commission contract during the closing period of World War II. She had a brief career before being decommissioned a year later.

== Construction ==
Muscatine was laid down under US Maritime Commission contract, MC hull 2151, by Globe Shipbuilding Co., Superior, Wisconsin, 21 December 1943; named Muscatine and classified AK-197 on 25 February 1944; launched 16 June 1944; sponsored by Mrs. William Kennedy; floated down the Mississippi River in November 1944, for completion at Pennsylvania Shipyards, Beaumont, Texas; acquired by the Navy on loan charter from the Maritime Commission 3 April 1945; placed in service from 3 April to 4 April during transfer to Houston, Texas, for fitting out at Brown Shipbuilding Co.; and commissioned at Houston 19 April 1945.

== Service history ==
=== World War II-related service ===
After shakedown along the Texas coast, Muscatine loaded a full cargo of "beer, Coca-Cola syrup, and a bottling unit" at Gulfport, Mississippi, before sailing 17 May for the central Pacific Ocean. She touched at Eniwetok, in the Marshall Islands, 26 June, thence from 2 to 7 July, steamed to Guam where she discharged her cargo.

Assigned to Service Squadron 8, she departed the Marianas 13 July and spent much of the final month of the Pacific war sailing to the US West Coast where she arrived San Francisco, California, 2 August. After loading refrigerated and "miscellaneous amphibious fleet issue" cargo, she sailed for the western Pacific the 18th.

Muscatine off loaded refrigerated stores at Ulithi, in the Caroline Islands, between 8 and 11 September; thence, from 15 September to 23 October she served as a stores ship in Leyte Gulf, Philippine Islands. On 30 October she reached Sasebo, Japan, where she began duty as a cargo issue ship to support the occupation of the defeated Japanese Empire.

She completed her occupation service 7 December and sailed for the United States. Steaming via the Marianas and the Panama Canal, she arrived Norfolk, Virginia, 6 February 1946.

=== Post-war decommissioning ===
She steamed to Baltimore, Maryland, 23 to 24 February and decommissioned there 7 March 1946. She was returned to War Shipping Administration (WSA) 12 March and her name was struck from the Navy List 20 March.

== Merchant service ==
Muscatine was acquired by J. Ludwig Moinckels Rederi of Norway, on 25 February 1947, for $693,862 and renamed Palma. She was scrapped in 1973.

== Honors and awards ==
Qualified Muscatine personnel were eligible for the following:

- American Campaign Medal
- Asiatic-Pacific Campaign Medal
- World War II Victory Medal
- Navy Occupation Medal (with Asia Clasp)

== Notes ==
Citations

== Bibliography ==
Online resources

- "Muscatine II (AK-197)". Dictionary of American Naval Fighting Ships. Naval History and Heritage Command. This article incorporates text from this source, which is in the public domain.
- "C1 Cargo Ships". www.ShipbuildingHistory.com. 28 August 2009.
- "USS Muscatine (AK-197)". NavSource. 7 March 2014.
- "Muscatine (AK-197)". United States Department of Transportation. Archived from the original on March 22, 2016.
