= USS Adria =

Cargo ship of the United States Navy

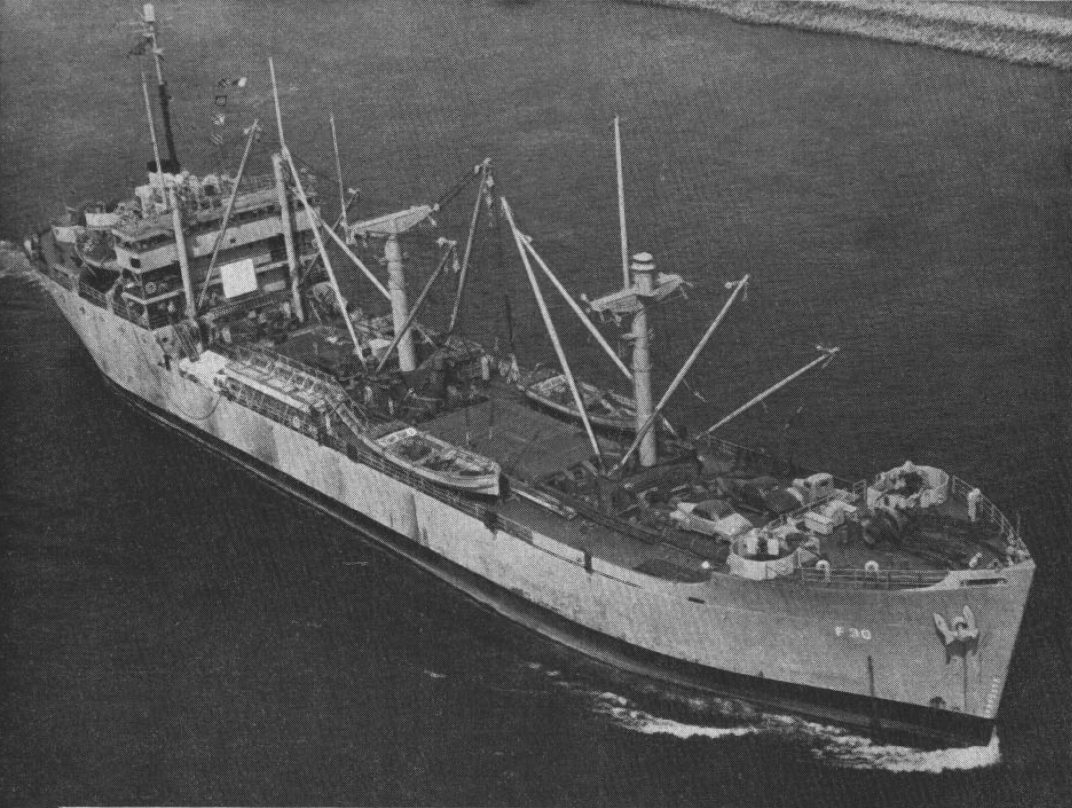
- USS Adria (AF-30) in 1949

History

United States
- Ordered: as R1-M-AV3 hull, MC hull 2194
- Laid down: 27 December 1943
- Launched: 16 April 1944
- Commissioned: 26 December 1944
- Decommissioned: 16 June 1954
- Stricken: 1 July 1960
- Fate: Sold by MARAD, 27 June 1977

General characteristics
- Tonnage: 2,120 long tons deadweight (DWT)
- Displacement: 3,139 t.(lt) 6,240 t.(fl)
- Length: 338 ft (103 m)
- Beam: 50 ft (15 m)
- Draught: 18 ft (5.5 m)
- Propulsion: Nordberg Diesel TSM diesel engine, single screw, 1,700shp
- Speed: 12 kts. (max)
- Complement: 84
- Armament: one single 3 in (76 mm) dual purpose gun mount, six single 20 mm gun mounts

USS Adria (AF-30) was an Adria-class stores ship in service with the United States Navy from 1944 to 1954. She was scrapped in 1977.

== History ==
Adria was laid down under a Maritime Commission contract (MC hull 2194) on 27 December 1943 at Beaumont, Texas, by the Pennsylvania Shipyards, Inc., launched on 16 April 1944, sponsored by Mrs. L. C. Allen; acquired by the Navy on a loan charter basis on 30 November 1944, converted at Galveston, Texas, for service as a store ship, and placed in commission at Galveston on 26 December 1944.

=== World War II ===
After her final fitting out, Adria held a shakedown cruise in the Gulf of Mexico off Galveston. She then sailed to Mobile, Alabama, to pick up cargo. The vessel got underway on 19 January 1945 and headed for the Panama Canal Zone. She reached Balboa on the 25th and discharged a portion of her cargo.

The ship then transited the Panama Canal and continued on toward Hawaii. She arrived at Pearl Harbor on 14 February and was subsequently assigned to service Squadron 8, Service Force, Pacific Fleet. On 18 February the store ship departed Hawaii, shaped a course for the west coast of the United States, and reached San Francisco, on the last day of the month.

Upon her arrival in San Francisco, the ship took on cargo and mail destined for Allied bases in the forward areas of the Pacific Ocean. She left California on 10 March and sailed directly to Eniwetok, Marshall Islands. She arrived at that atoll on the 31st and unloaded part of her cargo before continuing on to the Marianas. She arrived at Saipan on 5 April, then moved to Guam on the 9th to discharge the remainder of her provisions.

In mid-April, Adria sailed to Ulithi where she took on more supplies and sailed on 20 April for Kerama Retto. During the rest of April and the first half of May the vessel operated near Okinawa unloading her cargo to support forces in the area, enemy air alerts frequently interrupted her operations. During an air raid on 30 April, one of Adria's crew members was fatally wounded by the explosion of a small caliber shell. With her holds empty, the ship left Okinawa on 7 May to sail to Pearl Harbor.

After a pause at Ulithi, Adria arrived at Pearl Harbor on the 29th to take on more equipment and supplies and then reversed her course and proceeded back to Okinawa.

The store ship made stops at Eniwetok and Ulithi before reaching Okinawa on 4 July. Over the next three weeks, the vessel unloaded her cargo ashore. When this process was completed Adria sailed to the Philippine Islands. She paused at Leyte on 27 July; then continued on to Hawaii.

=== Cold War ===
The ship pulled into Pearl Harbor on 16 August soon after Japanese capitulation ended World War II. She spent almost one month in port for repairs and loading before sailing once again on 11 September. The vessel made a port call at Okinawa on 2 October, then sailed on to Korea. She touched at Jinsen on the 6th to unload her supplies in support of Allied occupation forces. The ship also stopped at Taku and Qingdao, China, to discharge cargo, before setting a course for the United States. She reached Seattle, Washington, on 16 November.

After voyage repairs at Seattle, Adria set sail on 16 December for the western Pacific. She made port calls at Saipan and Guam to unload her cargo, then left the latter island on 5 February 1946 to sail back to the United States. The ship reached Seattle on 28 February, but commenced another shuttle run to the Far East on 19 March. She visited Yokosuka, Japan; Shanghai, China and Hong Kong. The ship got underway from Shanghai on 24 May and shaped a course for the Panama Canal Zone. She transited the Panama Canal on 2 July, then sailed via Mobile, Alabama, to Norfolk, Virginia.

Upon her arrival at Norfolk on 10 July, Adria began operations with Service Force, Atlantic Fleet. During the remaining eight years of her naval career, the ship made supply runs to various points in the Caribbean and the Mediterranean. Among her ports of call were Guantánamo Bay, Cuba; Hamilton, Bermuda, Roosevelt Roads, Puerto Rico, Trinidad; Casablanca, Morocco; Gibraltar; Bremerhaven, Germany; Plymouth, England. and Argentia, Newfoundland. In addition to her overseas cargo runs, Adria operated along the east coast of the United States. She also held a number of training exercises and operations in the Chesapeake Bay. Her routine was also broken by regular periods of repair and upkeep at the Norfolk Naval Shipyard, Portsmouth, Virginia.

=== Decommissioning and fate ===
On 6 January 1954, the vessel entered the Philadelphia Naval Shipyard for a period of repair work prior to her inactivation. She got underway again on 9 March and sailed to Orange, Texas. Adria arrived there on 18 March. She was placed out of Commission, in reserve, at Orange on 1 June 1954 and was berthed there with the Texas Group, Atlantic Reserve Fleet. The ship remained at Orange until 1 July 1960, when her name was struck from the Navy list and she was transferred to the Maritime Administration for lay up at Beaumont, Texas. She was struck from the Naval Register, 1 July 1960. Final Disposition: sold by MARAD, 27 June 1977, her fate unknown.

== Military awards and honors ==
Adria’s crew was eligible for the following medals and ribbons:

- China Service Medal (extended)
- American Campaign Medal
- Asiatic-Pacific Campaign Medal
- World War II Victory Medal
- Navy Occupation Service Medal (with Asia clasp)
- National Defense Service Medal
