= Design 1001 ship =

Wood-hulled cargo ship design

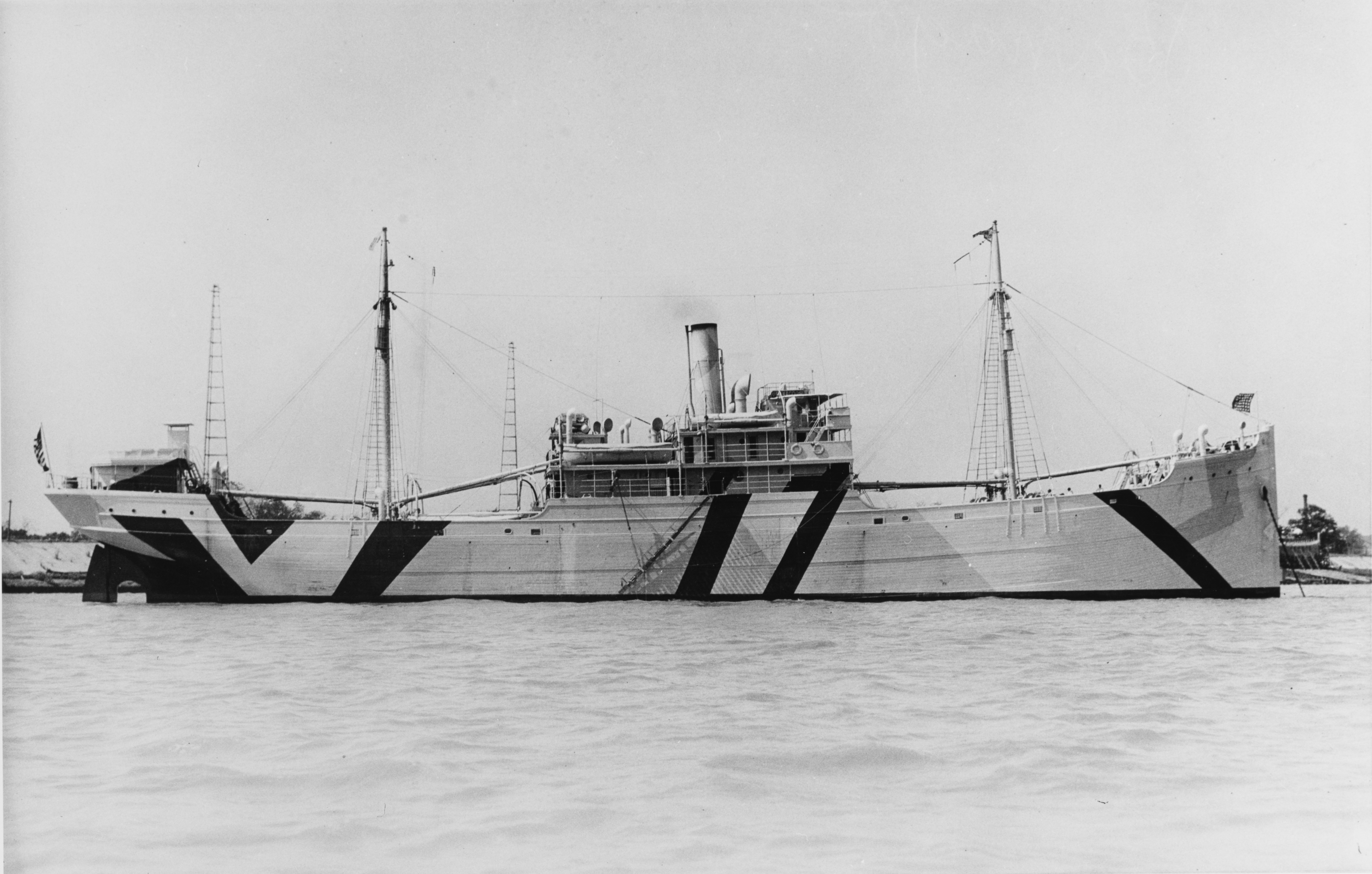
- Design 1001 Ferris-type ship USS Banago (ID # 3810).

Class overview
- Name: EFC Design 1001
- Builders: Numerous—see text
- Built: 1918–19 (USSB)

General characteristics
- Type: Cargo ship
- Tonnage: 2,551 GRT; 3,588 LT DWT
- Length: 281.8 ft (85.9 m) (overall); 268.0 ft (81.7 m) (p/p)
- Beam: 46.0 ft (14.0 m)
- Draft: 23.9 ft (7.3 m)
- Depth: 26.0 ft (7.9 m)
- Installed power: Two coal-fired watertube or Scotch boilers, triple-expansion steam engine, 1,400 ihp (1,000 kW); (Some ships: twin engines of same power)
- Propulsion: Single screw; (Some ships: twin screws)
- Speed: 10 knots (19 km/h; 12 mph)
- Crew: 42

The Design 1001 ship (full name Emergency Fleet Corporation Design 1001) was a wood-hulled cargo ship design approved for production by the United States Shipping Board's Emergency Fleet Corporation (EFC) in World War I. They were referred to as the "Ferris"-type after its designer, naval architect Theodore E. Ferris. Most ships were completed in 1918 or 1919. Many ships were completed as barges or as hulls.

== Design ==
Although the basic hull structure was wooden, the design made some use of steel reinforcement for added strength. There were two versions of the design, according to the local wood supplies available for construction: one for shipyards on the Atlantic and the Gulf of Mexico, to be made from yellow pine, and the other for Pacific coast shipyards, to be made from Douglas fir. Except for some details of construction, the two versions were basically similar, with nearly identical specifications.

A standard Design 1001 ship measured 281.8 feet (85.9 m) in overall length, 268.0 feet (81.7 m) in length between perpendiculars, 46.0 feet (14.0 m) in beam, and 26.0 feet (7.9 m) in hull depth, with a load draft of 23.9 feet (7.3 m). Tonnage was 2,551 gross register tons (GRT) and 3,588 long tons deadweight (DWT). The standard crew complement was 42. Propulsion was normally provided by a single triple-expansion steam engine of 1,400 indicated horsepower (1,000 kW), fed by two coal-fired boilers of either watertube or Scotch (firetube) type; the engine drove a single screw, giving a speed of 10 knots (19 km/h; 12 mph). One builder, G. M. Standifer Construction Company, made several twin-screw Design 1001 ships with a pair of smaller triple-expansion engines having the same combined power. (The design also offered the option of using a geared steam turbine for propulsion, but no turbine-powered Design 1001 ships were built.)

== Builders ==
Builders of Design 1001 ships

Builder	Shipyard location
Alabama Drydock and Shipbuilding Company	Mobile, Alabama
American Shipbuilding Company	Brunswick, Georgia
American Lumber Company	Millville, Florida
Barbare Brothers	Tacoma, Washington
Beaumont Shipbuilding & Dry Dock Company	Beaumont, Texas
Benicia Shipbuilding Company	Benicia, California
R. J. Chandler & Company	Wilmington, California
Coast Shipbuilding Company	Portland, Oregon
Coos Bay Shipbuilding Company	Marshfield, Oregon
Cumberland Shipbuilding Company	South Portland, Maine
Dantzler Shipbuilding Company	Moss Point, Mississippi
Dierks Blodgett Shipbuilding Company	Pascagoula, Mississippi
Feeney & Bremner Shipbuilding Company	Tillamook, Oregon
Foundation Shipbuilding Company	Newark, New Jersey
Freeport Shipbuilding Company	Freeport, Maine
Fulton Shipbuilding Company	Wilmington, California
George A. Gilchrist Shipbuilding Company	Thomaston, Maine
Gildersleeve Shipbuilding Company	Portland, Connecticut
Grant Smith-Porter Shipbuilding Company	Aberdeen, Washington and Portland, Oregon
Groton Iron Works	Noank, Connecticut
Hammond Lumber Company	Samoa, California
Heldenfels Brothers	Rockport, Texas
Hodge Ship Company	Moss Point, Mississippi
Housatonic Shipbuilding Company	Stratford, Connecticut
Jahncke Shipbuilding Company	Madisonville, Louisiana
Johnson Shipyard Corporation	Mariners Harbor, Staten Island
Kelly Spear Company	Bath, Maine
Kingston Shipbuilding Company	Kingston, New York
Kruse & Banks	North Bend, Oregon
Lone Star Shipbuilding Company	Beaumont, Texas
Maryland Shipbuilding Company	Dundalk, Maryland
Meacham & Babcock Company	Seattle, Washington
Midland Bridge Shipbuilding Company	Houston, Texas
Missouri Valley Bridge & Iron Company	Quantico, Virginia
Morey & Thomas	Jacksonville, Florida
J. W. Murdock Shipbuilding Company	Jacksonville, Florida
Murnan Shipbuilding Company	Mobile, Alabama
McBride & Law	Beaumont, Texas
J. N. McCammon Shipyard	Beaumont, Texas
McEachern Shipbuilding Company	Astoria, Oregon
Newcomb Lifeboat Company / Hampton Shipbuilding & Marine Railway Company / C. H. Tenny Shipyard	Hampton, Virginia
Nilson & Kelez Shipbuilding Company	Seattle, Washington
North Carolina Shipbuilding Company	Morehead City, North Carolina
Patterson McDonald Shipbuilding Company	Seattle, Washington
Portland Ship Ceiling Company	Portland, Maine
Potomac Shipbuilding Company	Quantico, Virginia
G. F. Rodgers Shipbuilding Company	Astoria, Oregon
Rolph Shipbuilding Company	Fairhaven, California
Russell Shipbuilding Company	Portland, Maine
St. Helens Shipbuilding Company	St. Helens, Oregon
St. John's River Shipbuilding Company	Jacksonville, Florida
Sanderson & Porter	Raymond, Washington
Sandy Point Shipbuilding Company	Sandy Point, Maine
Seaborn Shipbuilding Company	Tacoma, Washington
Shattuck Shipyard	Portsmouth, New Hampshire
Ship Construction & Trading Company	Stonington, Connecticut
Sloan Shipyards	Olympia, Washington
H. Smith & Sons	Curtis Bay, Maryland
Sommarstrohm Brothers Shipbuilding Company	Columbia City, Oregon
Southern Shipbuilding & Drydock Company	Orange, Texas
G. M. Standifer Construction Company	Portland, Oregon
Tacoma Shipbuilding Company	Tacoma, Washington
Tampa Dock Company	Tampa, Florida
Traylor Shipbuilding Company, Cornwells	Pennsylvania
Union Bridge & Construction Company	Morgan City, Louisiana
United States Maritime Corporation	Brunswick, Georgia
Universal Shipbuilding Company	Houston, Texas
Wilson Shipbuilding Company	Astoria, Oregon
Winslow Marine Railway and Shipbuilding Company	Winslow, Washington
Wright Shipyard	Tacoma, Washington
York River Shipbuilding Company	West Point, Virginia

== Gallery ==
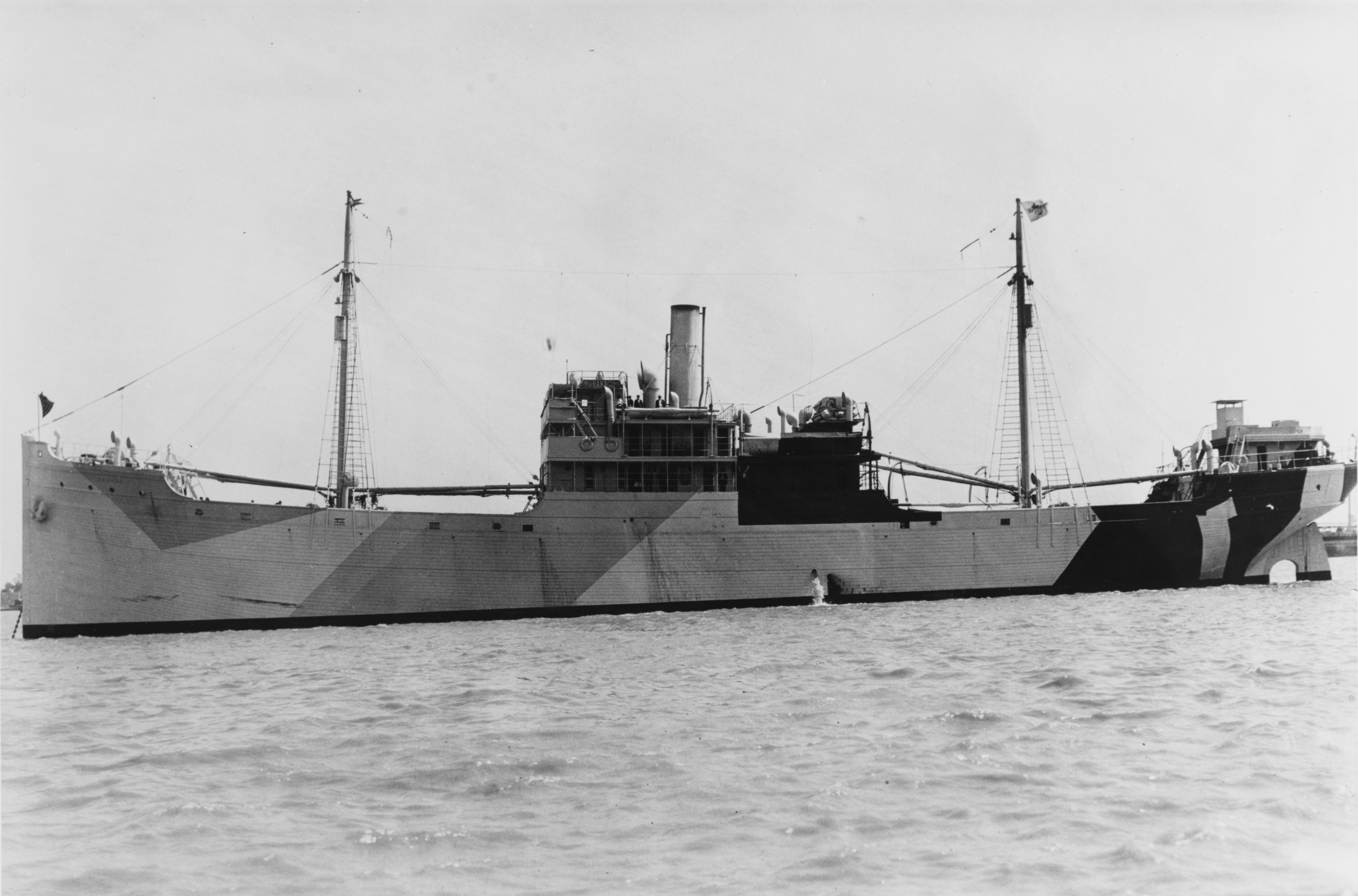
Another view of USS Banago.

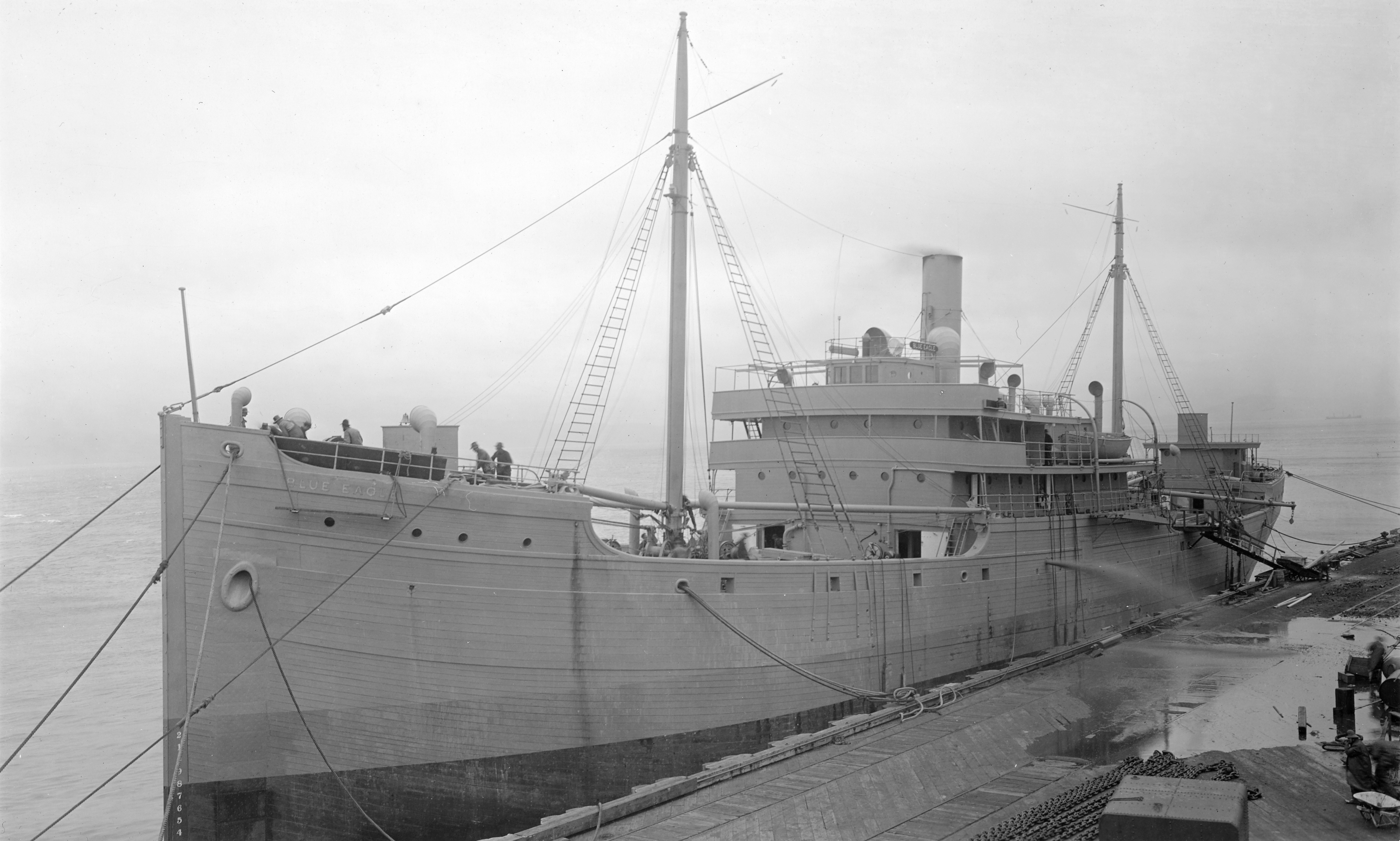
SS Blue Eagle, built by George F. Rodgers Shipbuilding Company.

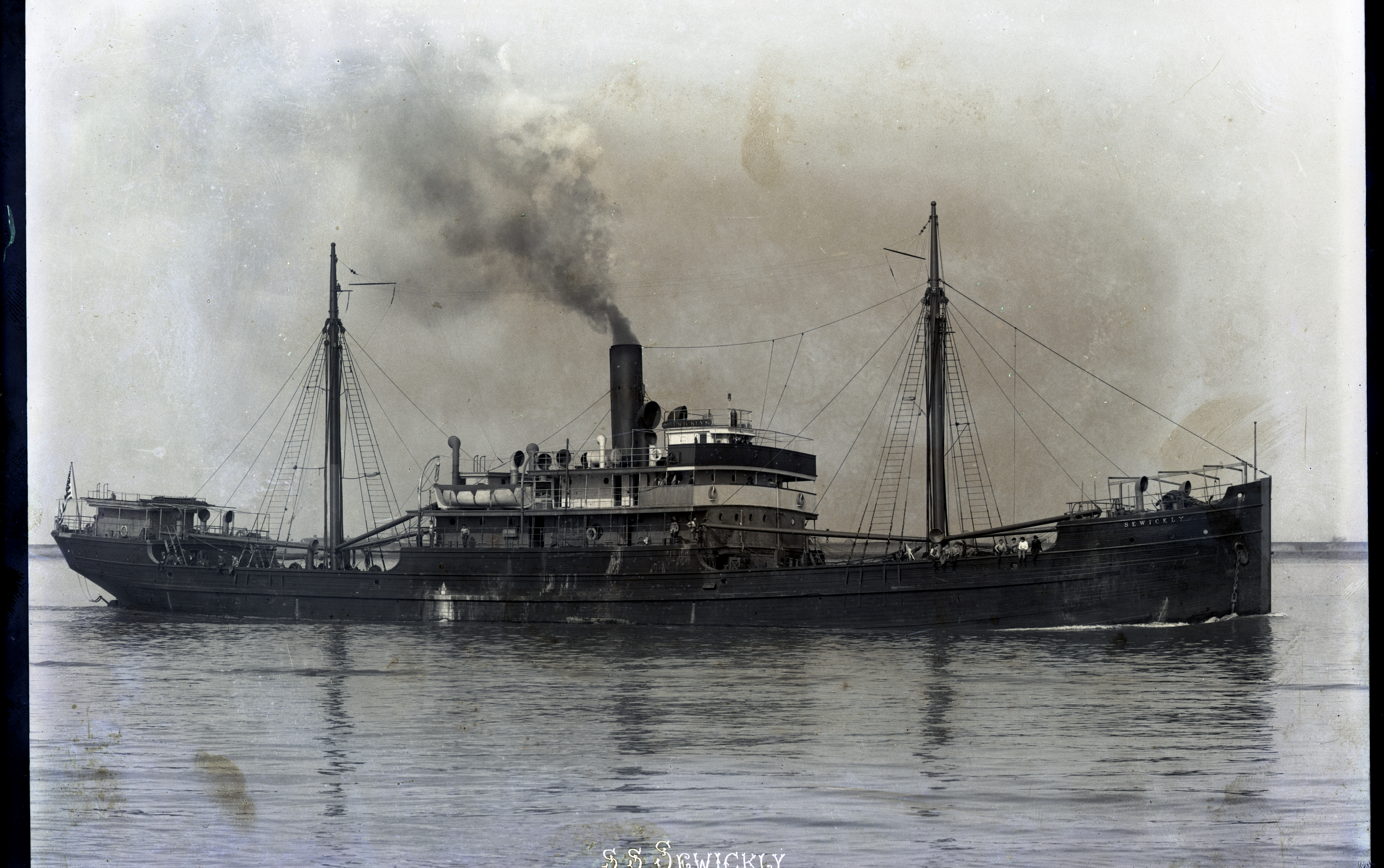
SS Sewickly in operation at full load draft

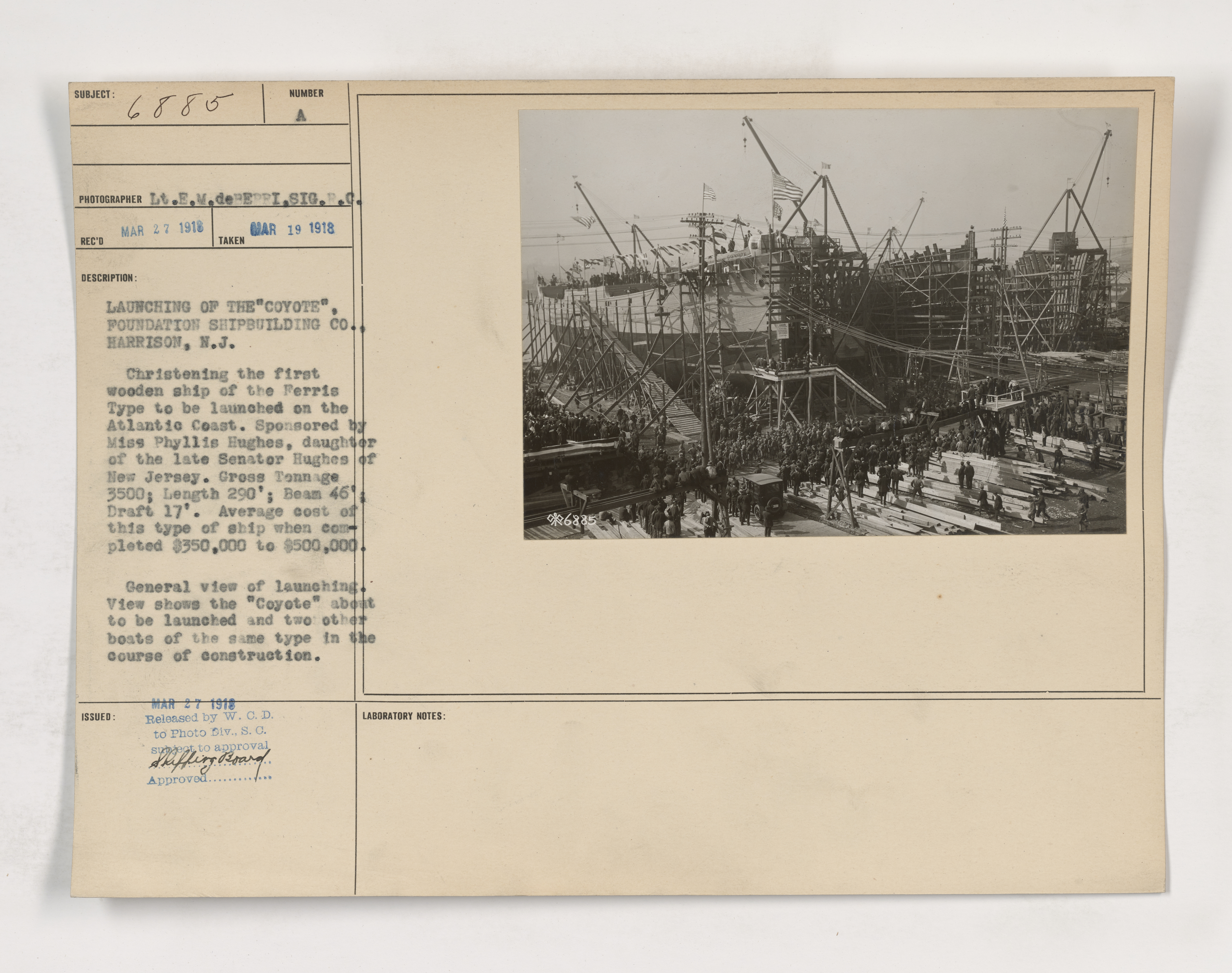
The 1918 launching of the Coyote at Foundation Shipbuilding Company in Harrison, New Jersey.
