= USS Corduba =

Cargo ship of the United States Navy

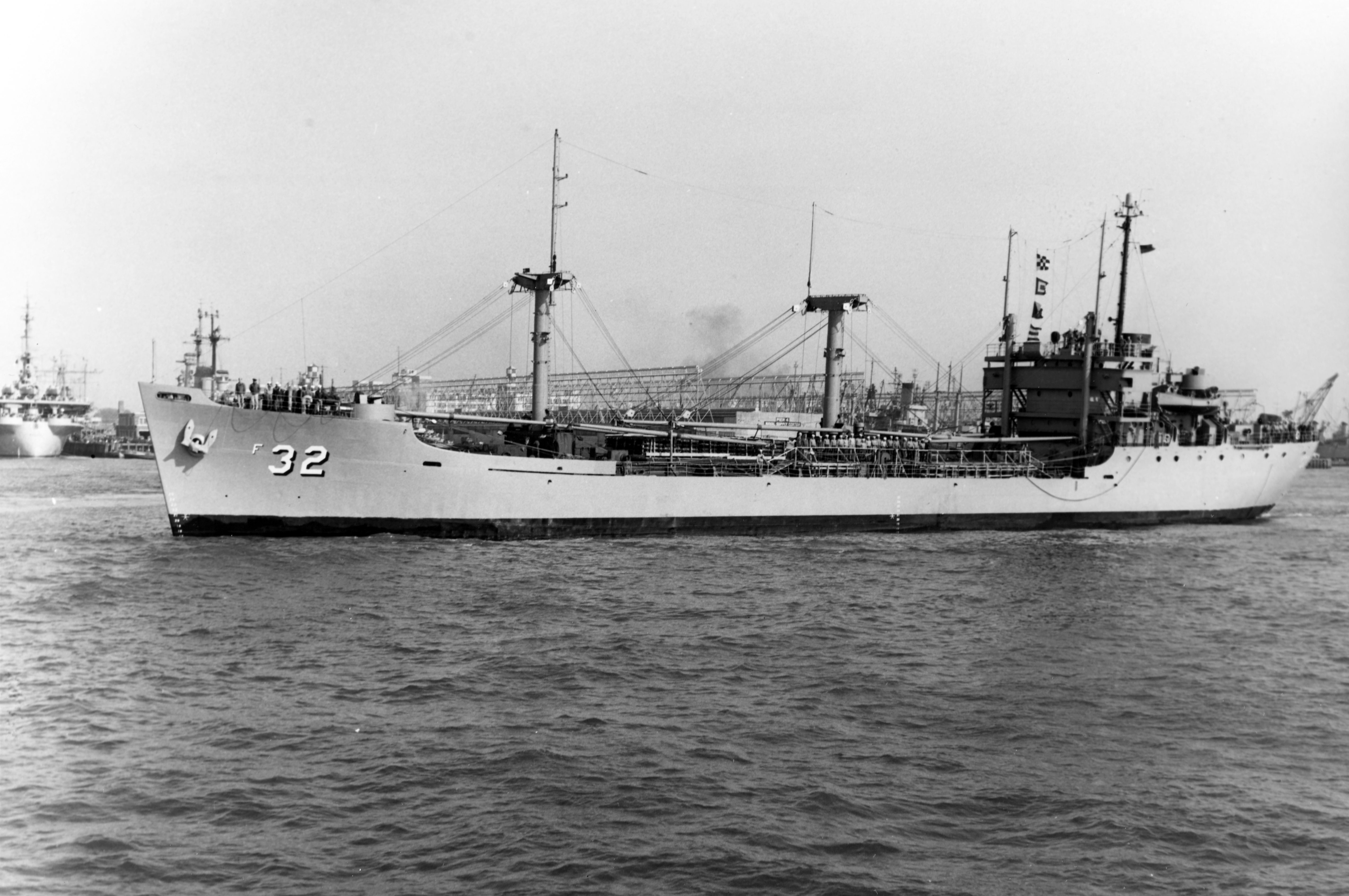
- Corduba in 1952

History

United States
- Ordered: as R1-M-AV3 hull, MC hull 2196
- Builder: Pennsylvania Shipyards, Inc
- Laid down: date unknown
- Launched: 11 June 1944
- Acquired: 30 December 1944
- Commissioned: 26 January 1945
- Decommissioned: 20 August 1955
- Stricken: date unknown
- Fate: Scrapped, 1974

General characteristics
- Tonnage: 2,120 long tons deadweight (DWT)
- Displacement: 3,139 t.(lt) 6,240 t.(fl)
- Length: 338 ft (103 m)
- Beam: 50 ft (15 m)
- Draught: 18 ft (5.5 m)
- Propulsion: diesel engine, single screw, 1,700 shp
- Speed: 12 knots (22 km/h) maximum
- Complement: 84
- Armament: one single 3 in (76 mm) dual purpose gun mount, six single 20 mm guns gun mounts

USS Corduba (AF-32) was an Adria class stores ship in service with the United States Navy from 1945 to 1955. She was scrapped in 1974.

== History ==
Corduba was launched 11 June 1944 by Pennsylvania Shipyards, Inc, Beaumont, Texas, under a Maritime Commission contract; sponsored by Mrs. R. R. Clark; transferred to the Navy 30 December 1944; and commissioned 26 January 1945.

=== World War II ===
Clearing Galveston, Texas, 13 February 1945 Corduba loaded cargo at Mobile, Alabama, sailed through the Panama Canal, and arrived at Pearl Harbor 19 March. The last day of the month she sailed for Eniwetok, arriving 11 April to report to Commander, Service Squadron 10. Corduba carried provisions from Auckland, New Zealand, to Tinian, Guam, Manus, Peleliu, and Saipan, from 12 April to her return to San Francisco, California, 15 October.

=== Cold War ===
After reloading at San Francisco, California, Corduba put to sea 27 October 1945 for Okinawa and Qingdao, China. From 26 November to 23 December she issued refrigerated provisions to ships serving in the reoccupation of China. Returning to San Pedro, California, 18 January 1946, Corduba carried cargo to the Philippines between 31 January and 18 April, and cleared San Francisco 20 May for the U.S. East Coast. She arrived at Charleston, South Carolina, 10 June.

Assigned to Service Force, Atlantic Fleet, Corduba carried provisions to Argentia, the Caribbean, northern Europe, and the Mediterranean.

=== Decommissioning and fate ===
She was placed in commission in reserve 20 August 1955 to begin her pre-inactivation overhaul at Charleston, South Carolina, and was placed out of commission in reserve there. She was transferred to the National Defense Reserve Fleet on 6 April 1960. Corduba was loaned to the U.S. Army and was reactivated 2 Jan 1962 at Ft. Eustis, Virginia (USA) by U.S. Army personnel of the 70th Transportation Detachment. Activation took two weeks at a cost of $6,500, saving the U.S. Army from chartering a similar vessel for 90 days at a cost of $27,000. Corduba was than used to train U.S. Army stevedores from 2 January 1962 to 10 January 1964 and 22 June 1966 to 1 October 1968. She was sold for scrap on 30 July 1974.

== Military awards and honors ==
Corduba's crew was eligible for the following medals:

- China Service Medal (extended)
- American Campaign Medal
- Asiatic-Pacific Campaign Medal
- World War II Victory Medal
- Navy Occupation Service Medal (with Asia clasp)
- National Defense Service Medal
