= USS Portent =

Minesweeper of the United States Navy

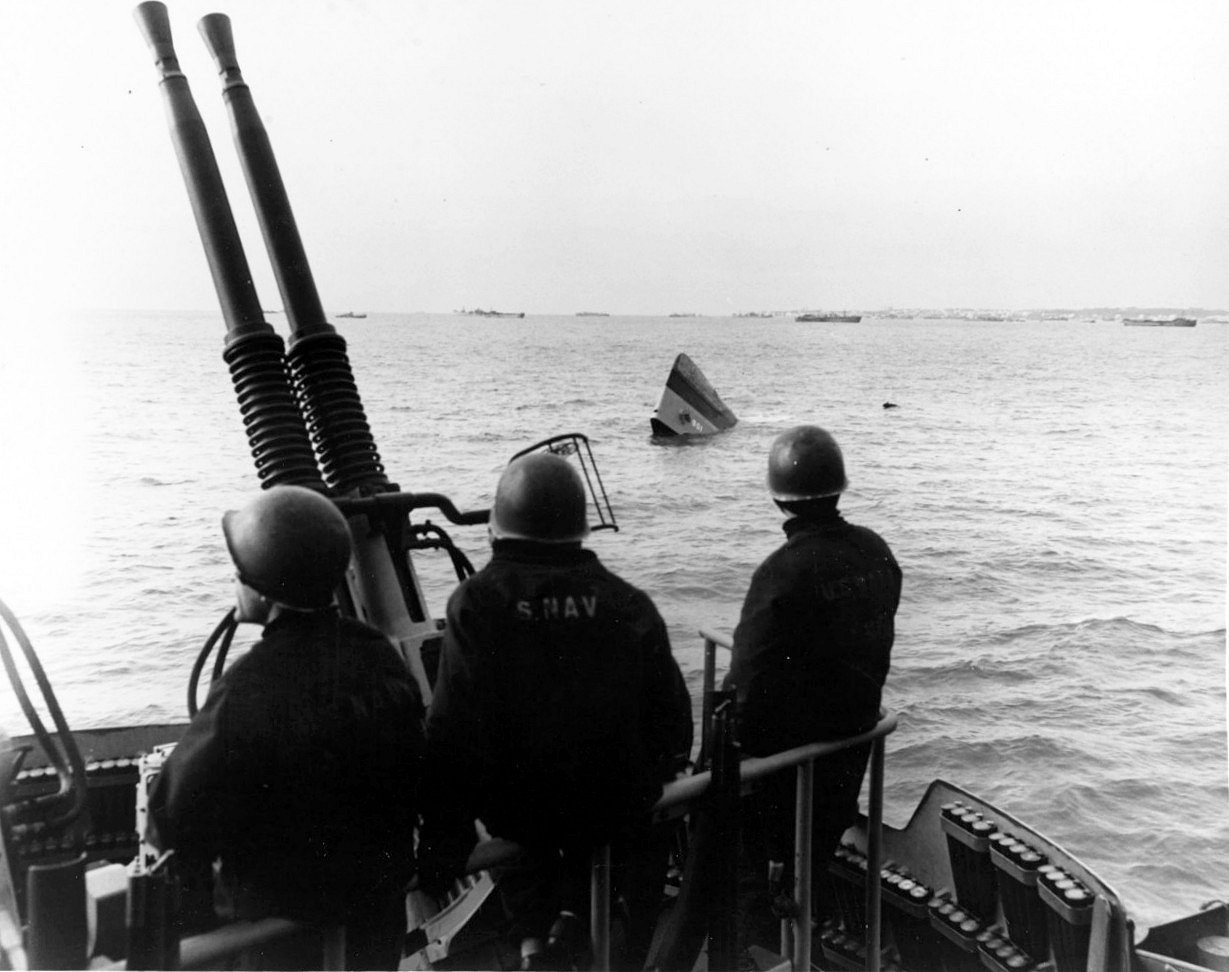
- Portent sinking on 22 January 1944, seen from USS Brooklyn

History

United States
- Name: USS Portent
- Builder: Pennsylvania Shipyards Inc., Beaumont, Texas
- Laid down: 15 November 1941
- Launched: 16 August 1942
- Sponsored by: Mrs. Arthur L. Kline, Jr.
- Commissioned: 3 April 1943
- Honors and awards: 1 Battle Star (World War II)
- Fate: Sunk by a mine off the Italian coast, 22 January 1944

General characteristics
- Class & type: Auk-class minesweeper
- Displacement: 890 long tons (904 t)
- Length: 221 ft 3 in (67.44 m)
- Beam: 32 ft (9.8 m)
- Draft: 10 ft 9 in (3.28 m)
- Speed: 18 kn (21 mph; 33 km/h)
- Complement: 100 officers and enlisted
- Armament: 1 × 3 in (76 mm)/50 cal dual-purpose gun, 2 × 40 mm guns, 2 × 20 mm cannons, 2 × depth charge tracks, 2 × depth charge projectors

USS Portent (AM-106) was an Auk-class minesweeper acquired by the United States Navy for the dangerous task of removing mines from minefields laid in the water to prevent ships from passing.

Portent — a metal-hulled minesweeper — was named after the word "portent," something that foreshadows a coming event. In this case, it was an appropriate name since the Portent struck a mine and was sunk not long after her commissioning.

Portent was laid down on 15 November 1941 by the Pennsylvania Shipyards, Inc., Beaumont, Texas, launched on 16 August 1942, sponsored by Mrs. Arthur L. Kline, Jr., and commissioned on 3 April 1943.

== North Atlantic World War II operations ==
Portent sailed via Algiers, Louisiana, and Key West, Florida, to New York City to join a convoy to Casablanca and various North African ports on 14 May 1943. From May–November, she escorted convoys between New York City and Casablanca, Morocco. Assigned to a convoy entering the Mediterranean, she anchored outside Oran, Algeria on 22 November.

== Sunk off the Italian coast ==
Deployed to Italy, she arrived at Naples on 19 December. Assigned to the invasion of Anzio, Italy Portent struck a mine while patrolling near the Italian coast and sank at 41°24′N 12°44′E on 22 January 1944. Nearby ships rescued survivors.

== Awards ==
Portent received one battle star for World War II service.
