= USS Kerstin =

Cargo ship of the United States Navy

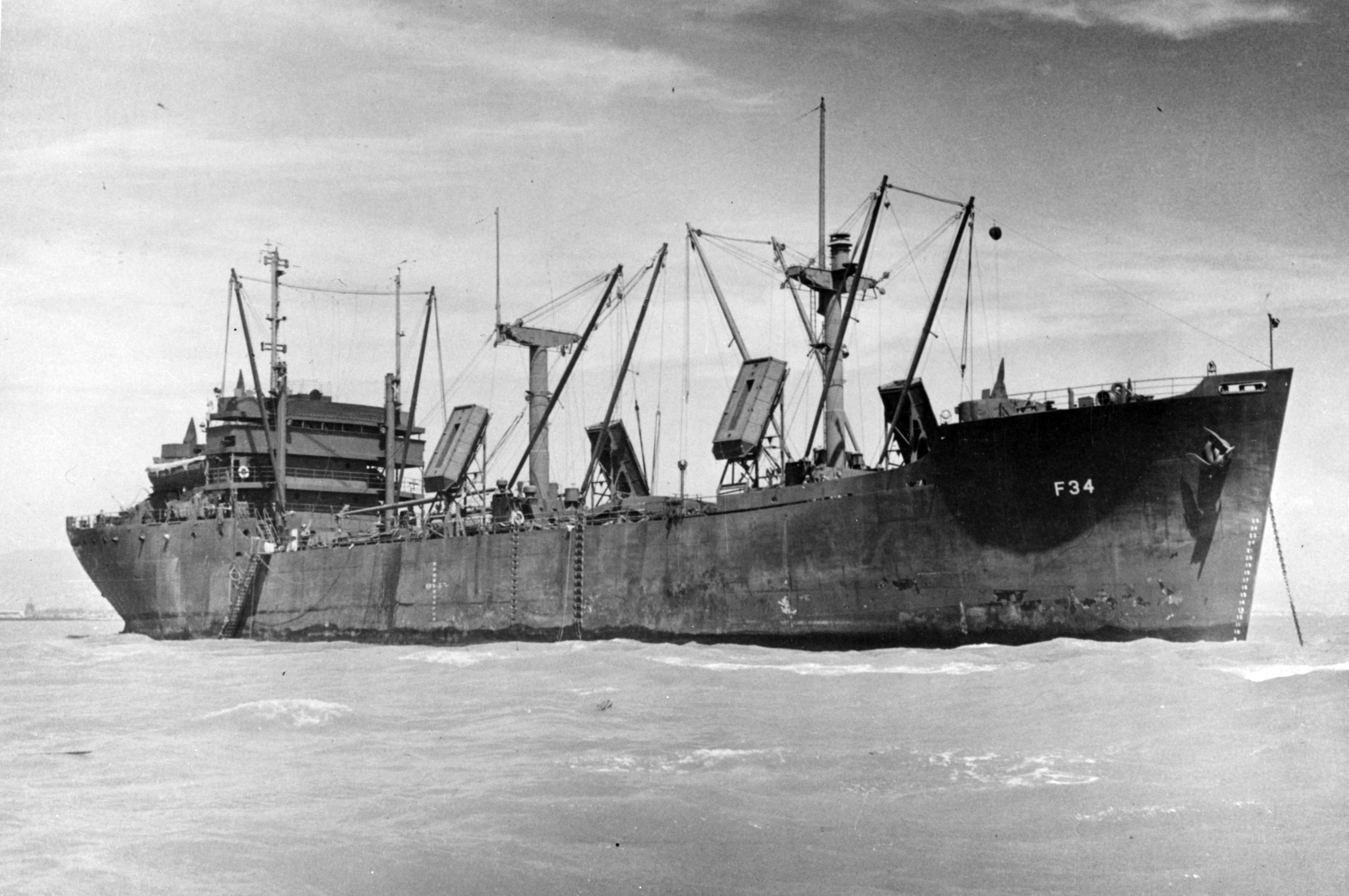

History

United States
- Ordered: as R1-M-AV3 hull, MC hull 2198
- Builder: Pennsylvania Shipyards
- Laid down: date unknown
- Launched: 16 July 1944
- Acquired: 22 January 1945
- Commissioned: 23 February 1945
- Decommissioned: 12 May 1950
- Stricken: 16 June 1950
- Fate: Scrapped (date unknown)

General characteristics
- Tonnage: 2,120 long tons deadweight (DWT)
- Displacement: 3,139 t.(lt) 6,240 t.(fl)
- Length: 338 ft (103 m)
- Beam: 50 ft (15 m)
- Draught: 18 ft (5.5 m)
- Propulsion: diesel engine, single screw, 1,700shp
- Speed: 12 kts. (max)
- Complement: 84
- Armament: one single 3 in (76 mm) dual purpose gun mount, six single 20 mm gun mounts

USS Kerstin (AF-34) was an Adria class stores ship in service with the United States Navy from 1945 to 1950.

== History ==
Kerstin was launched 16 July 1944 by Pennsylvania Shipyards, Beaumont, Texas, under a United States Maritime Commission contract; sponsored by Mrs. W. B. Towns; acquired by the Navy 22 January 1945; and commissioned 23 February 1945 at Houston, Texas.

=== World War II ===
Departing Galveston, Texas, 14 March, Kerstin loaded cargo at Mobile, Alabama, and arrived Pearl Harbor 14 April. Assigned to Service Squadron 8, she took on board 1,680 tons of refrigerated and dry provisions and sailed 20 April, reaching Eniwetok 2 May. For more than 6 months she made supply runs, transporting frozen food to ships and bases at Iwo Jima, Saipan, Tinian, Guam, Ulithi, Manus, Nouméa, and Auckland, New Zealand.

While steaming from Saipan to Iwo Jima 13 July, she directed the prompt rescue of nine men from a disabled B-29 bomber, which splashed about 2 miles off her port quarter while returning to Tinian after a raid over Tokyo. Before departing Saipan 29 November for her return to the United States, Kerstin had travel led more than 26,000 miles and delivered over 5,500 tons of refrigerated cargo.

=== Post-war activity ===
Arriving San Pedro, California, 20 December, Kerstin again deployed to the Pacific Ocean, 1 January 1946, to transport provision to Wake Island, Tarawa, Samoa, and the Marshalls before returning to San Francisco, California, 24 May. Departing 29 June for cargo operations in the Far East, Kerstin made 11 voyages to the Pacific between June 1946 and December 1949. Steaming to bases scattered throughout the Pacific, her deployments included four runs to the Far East, three to the Marianas and the Marshalls, and four to Pearl Harbor.

=== Decommissioning and fate ===
Departing Manila Bay 25 November 1949, Kerstin steamed via Guam en route to San Francisco, where she arrived 22 December. After overhaul at Mare Island Navy Yard, she decommissioned 12 May 1950 and transferred to the Maritime Commission. Her name was struck from the Naval Vessel Register 16 June. She was placed in the Maritime Administration Reserve Fleet, berthed at Suisun Bay, California and struck from the Naval Vessel Register, 16 June 1950. Final disposition: scrapped (date unknown).

== Military awards and honors ==
Kerstin's crew was eligible for the following medals:

- American Campaign Medal
- Asiatic–Pacific Campaign Medal
- World War II Victory Medal
- Navy Occupation Service Medal (with Asia Clasp)
