= USS Pilot =

Minesweeper of the United States Navy

History

United States
- Name: USS Pilot (AM-104)
- Builder: Pennsylvania Shipyards Inc., Beaumont, Texas
- Laid down: 27 October 1941
- Launched: 5 July 1942
- Commissioned: 3 February 1943
- Decommissioned: 15 January 1947
- Recommissioned: 5 March 1952
- Decommissioned: October 1954
- Reclassified: MSF-104, 7 February 1955
- Stricken: 1 July 1972
- Honours and awards: 3 battle stars (World War II)
- Fate: Sold to Mexico, 19 July 1972

History

Mexico
- Name: ARM Juan Aldama (C85)
- Namesake: Juan Aldama
- Acquired: 19 July 1972
- Reclassified: G18
- Reclassified: P116, 1993
- Decommissioned: retired from service by 2004
- Fate: unknown

General characteristics
- Class & type: Auk-class minesweeper
- Displacement: 890 long tons (904 t)
- Length: 221 ft 3 in (67.44 m)
- Beam: 32 ft (9.8 m)
- Draft: 10 ft 9 in (3.28 m)
- Speed: 18 knots (33 km/h; 21 mph)
- Complement: 100 officers and enlisted
- Armament: 1 × 3"/50 caliber gun; 2 × 40 mm guns; 2 × 20 mm guns; 2 × Depth charge tracks

USS Pilot (AM-104) was a United States Navy Auk-class minesweeper that saw service in the Mediterranean and Pacific Theaters of Operations during World War II.

She was decommissioned and reentered the Reserve Fleet in October 1954, and struck from the Naval Register in July 1972 before being transferred to Mexico that month. She was retired from service in 2004.

Pilot was the second U.S. Navy ship to bear the name, drawn from the word "pilot," which is defined as one employed to steer a vessel; a helmsman.

== Service history ==
Pilot was laid down as an ocean-going minesweeper by the Pennsylvania Shipyards Inc., Beaumont, Texas, 27 October 1941; launched 5 July 1942; sponsored by Miss Jacqueline Perry; and commissioned 3 February 1943.

=== Atlantic Ocean operations ===
After sea trials, Pilot sailed 10 February via New Orleans, Louisiana, and Key West, Florida, for Norfolk, Virginia, arriving 1 March. After training at the Naval Mine Warfare School, Yorktown, Virginia, and in the Chesapeake Bay, Pilot sailed 1 April with Task Group 68.2, made rendezvous with a convoy and the next day, set course for Port Royal Bay, Bermuda, arriving on the 4th. On 14 April Pilot screened another convoy headed to French Morocco, arriving Casablanca on 29 April.

Pilot stood out again the same day en route to Admiralty Harbor, Gibraltar, where she arrived the next day. On 3 May she sailed for Bermuda and on 6 May made two attacks on possible submarines. She arrived Norfolk, Virginia, 20 May.

On 12 June Pilot stood out from New York with Task Force 61 en route to the Mediterranean. When a French naval tanker of the convoy was torpedoed 22 June and sank stern first, Pilot rescued 111 survivors. The following day she transferred the passengers to Merrimack (AO-37).

Pilot arrived off Casablanca harbor 3 July. On the 5th, she got underway for Gibraltar to fuel, and the following day departed, escorting a convoy toward the United States, arriving Norfolk, Virginia 24 July.

=== Mediterranean operations ===
On 5 August, Pilot stood out en route to the Mediterranean again. She arrived at Casablanca, French Morocco, 23 August and Mers-el-Kebir, Algeria, 29 August where several more vessels joined her convoy. She sailed again on 1 September for Salerno, Italy. On 8 September Pilot was detached from escort duty and assigned mine-sweeping duties with seven other minesweepers, sweeping a channel off the Salerno beachhead. After the beachhead had been established, Pilot patrolled the area. On 18 September her alert gunners shot down a German Messerschmitt Bf 109 fighter aircraft.

Pilot continued escort and training duties in the Mediterranean until she sailed up the northwest coast of Italy 21 January 1944, with five other fleet type minesweepers conducting sweep operations under cover of darkness. On 25 January when a mine sank YMS–30, Pilot picked up several survivors and four bodies while other ships also recovered members of the crew. On 26 January when a British LST, carrying the 83rd U.S. Army Chemical Battalion, sank, Pilot again rescued survivors.

On 29 January Pilot swept a new fire support area, despite fire from the beach. On 3 February, Pilot sailed for Bizerte, Tunisia escorting Biscayne. She returned to Palermo on the 17th and sailed on for Naples the same day. The next day Pilot received orders to rendezvous with SS Samuel Ashe and escort her to Anzio, Italy in company with YMS–55. Unfortunately SS Samuel Ashe collided with Pilot and one man was killed. Later, Pilot was towed into port at Naples for repairs.

=== Return to the US ===
Pilot sailed 7 March for Palermo, Sicily; and, on 14 April, joined homebound convoy GUS 36 and arrived Norfolk, Virginia 2 May. After repairs and training at Little Creek, Virginia, until September, Pilot served for the remainder of the year as a mine sweeping school ship. Jan. 1st. 1953 while based in Charleston, SC. USS Pilot sailed on another Mediterranean cruise of approximately six months stopping first in Oran then to Italy, France, Grece. then returned to Charleston.

=== Pacific Ocean operations ===
Pilot set course for the Panama Canal on 20 June 1945, and proceeded via San Pedro, California, to Pearl Harbor. On 3 September Pilot got underway via Eniwetok, Saipan, and Okinawa, to Sasebo, Kyūshū, Japan arriving on the 17th. On 26 October she set out en route to Kokuzan To, Japan escorting PGM–26. On the next day she was detached from escort duties to sweep an area at Me Shima until arriving at Kiirun, Formosa 25 November. She set out again on the 27th for Takao, Formosa to sweep more mines. On 21 December Pilot sailed for Shanghai, China. In January 1946 Pilot returned to the United States and was placed out of commission in reserve 15 January 1947.

=== Final commission and sale ===
On 5 March 1952 she recommissioned for service on the U.S. West Coast. She decommissioned and reentered the Reserve Fleet in October 1954. She was redesignated MSF-104 on 7 February 1955.

Pilot was struck from the Naval Register on 1 July 1972 and transferred to Mexico on 19 July.

=== Awards ===
Pilot received three battle stars for World War II service.

=== Mexican Navy service ===
On 19 July 1972, the former Pilot was sold to the Mexican Navy as ARM Juan Aldama (C85). Employed as a patrol vessel, her pennant number was later changed to G18, and, in 1993, changed again to P116. By 2004, Juan Aldama had been retired from active service.
