= Shenandoah (1902) =

Three-masted schooner with a steel hull, built in New York in 1902

- Other names: Lasca II, Atlantide
- Designer(s): Theodore E. Ferris
- Builder: Townsend & Downey, NY
- Launched: 12 April 1902
- Fate: Active

Specifications
- Type: 3-mast steel schooner
- Displacement: 300 metric tonnes
- Length: 54.35 m (sparred); 44.20 (on deck); 32.63 (waterline)
- Beam: 8.23 m
- Draft: 4.65 m
- Sail area: 888 m^{2}

Notes
- MMSI 235062000

The Shenandoah is a three-masted schooner with a steel hull, built in New York in 1902 as a private yacht for the American financier Gibson Fahnestock. She has had a series of private owners since, and is available today for charter.

== History ==
Shenandoah was designed by Theodore E. Ferris for the American financier Gibson Fahnestock. She was launched in 1902 in Staten Island. Homeported at Newport, she sailed the Mediterranean until 1905. The schooner has a strong resemblance to German Emperor Wilhelm II's Meteor III which was built in the same shipyard.

In 1912 she was bought by the German Walther von Brüning. Her new home port became Kiel and she was renamed Lasca II. She was confiscated by the British navy during the First World War.

In 1919 the yacht was acquired by Lord John Espen, who rechristened her Shenandoah. Two years later it was bought by Godfrey H. Williams and refitted with engines. In 1925, the yacht was sold again to the Italian prince Spado Veralli and rechristened Atlantide.

=== Viggo Jarl and the Atlantide expedition ===
Atlantide was bought in 1929 by the Danish sculptor Viggo Jarl, heir to the Danish industrial tycoon C. F. Tietgen and son of Vilhelm Jørgensen, part owner of the very profitable mining company Kryolitselskabet Øresund. Jarl refitted the ship with large amounts of modern equipment, including diesel engines and electricity. During the Second World War Atlantide was hidden in a Danish shipyard in Troense, where one engine and all masts were removed, to make the ship not seaworthy and thus useless for the German occupying forces. After the war the ship was brought back into shape and Jarl generously offered the ship at the disposal of Copenhagen University for a ten-month oceanographic expedition, all expenses paid for. This expedition, led by Dr. Anton Bruun, went to the tropical waters along the African west coast and became known as the Atlantide expedition. Rigging the ship for the expedition was difficult immediately after the war and equipment had to be borrowed from here and there. Wires for the trawls were obtained in England, where they had served as anchor wires for blimps during the war. As a courtesy in return for this favour, as well as permission from the British Admiralty to navigate the high seas immediately after the war, a British zoologist was invited to join the expedition. The choice fell on Francis C. Fraser, who later became director of the British Museum Natural History. The other scientists onboard besides Fraser and Bruun were Torben Wolff and Jørgen Knudsen.

The expedition left Copenhagen on 3 October 1945. The scientific work started at the Cape Verde Islands, which were reached on 8 December. Most of the work was done in the epipelagic zone (between 15 and 150 m) along the coast between Dakar to the north and Luanda, Angola to the south. Atlantide returned to Copenhagen on 17 June 1946. The expedition produced a wealth of new knowledge about the oceanography and marine life in a part of the ocean that had previously been very poorly studied. The scientific results were published jointly by the Zoological Museum of Copenhagen and the British Museum Natural History in 14 volumes of the Atlantide Reports, the last volume published in 1993.

=== Later owners ===
Jarl sold Atlantide to France in 1952. The owner was the company Compania de Navigacion San Augustin. The exact whereabouts of the ship in the following years is not well known, but it is believed that the ship was involved in illegal shipping of various contraband in Central America. What is known is that the ship was seized by French customs in 1962. Moored and left to decay, the ship was eventually bought by French industrialist Baron Marcel Bich in 1972 after fighting a veritable paper war with the French authorities. Bich restored the ship to full previous glory and returned her name to Shenandoah. Under his ownership she became a charter yacht, sailing mainly in the Mediterranean Sea.

In 1986 she was sold to Swiss businessman Phillip Bommer, who performed a complete restoration at the McMullen & Wing shipyard in Auckland. Most of the original riveted hull was replaced and in 1997 the Shenandoah was awarded "Best Classic Yacht Restoration".

=== Today ===
The ship is now owned by Italian Francesco Micheli, registered on the island of Sark, and sails as a charter vessel.

== See also ==
- List of large sailing yachts
