= USS Prevail (AM-107) =

Minesweeper of the United States Navy

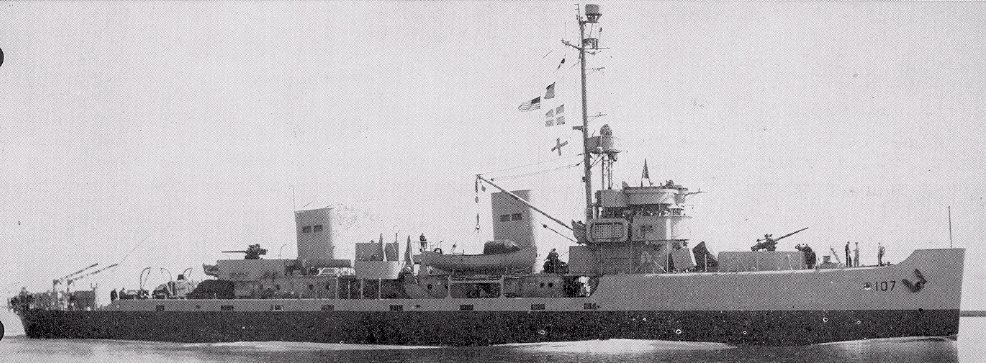

History

United States
- Name: Prevail
- Builder: Pennsylvania Shipyards Inc., Beaumont, Texas
- Laid down: 15 November 1941
- Launched: 13 September 1942
- Commissioned: 17 April 1943
- Decommissioned: 31 May 1946
- Recommissioned: 1 April 1952
- Decommissioned: 1963
- Reclassified: AGS-20, 1 April 1952
- Stricken: 10 January 1964
- Honours and awards: 6 battle stars (World War II)
- Fate: Sold, 13 October 1964

General characteristics
- Class & type: Auk-class minesweeper
- Displacement: 890 long tons (904 t)
- Length: 221 ft 3 in (67.44 m)
- Beam: 32 ft (9.8 m)
- Draft: 10 ft 9 in (3.28 m)
- Speed: 18 knots (33 km/h; 21 mph)
- Complement: 100 officers and enlisted
- Armament: 1 × 3"/50 caliber gun; 2 × 40 mm guns

USS Prevail (AM-107) was an Auk-class minesweeper acquired by the United States Navy for the dangerous task of removing mines from minefields laid in the water to prevent ships from passing.

Prevail, a steel-hulled minesweeper, was named after the word "prevail," meaning to gain ascendancy through strength or superiority.

Prevail was laid down by Pennsylvania Shipyards Inc., Beaumont, Texas, 15 November 1941; launched 13 September 1942; sponsored by Mrs. T. B. Moran; and commissioned 17 April 1943.

== World War II Mediterranean operations ==
After training at Key West, Florida, Prevail spent several months on escort duty with convoys between the U.S. East Coast and Casablanca. Beginning 8 September, she took part in the main sweeps off Salerno and remained off that beachhead on patrol for thirty days. The next operation consisted of sweeps for the establishment of the Anzio beachhead, 21 to 24 January 1944, where Prevail was subjected to intense air attack and was damaged by a near bomb miss which forced her to proceed to Palermo and Oran for repairs.

== Supporting Operation Dragoon ==
In April 1944, Prevail resumed operations off Anzio and Naples. On 17 August she departed Naples as part of the force for the invasion of southern France. Between 18–23 August she acted as control ship for sweeping operations at Cavalaire-sur-Mer, France, the first step in opening the port of Marseille. Miscellaneous assignments along the southern coast of France followed and in November she was ordered to the United States.

== Transfer to Pacific Theatre of operations ==
Arriving at Norfolk, Virginia, 11 December, Prevail was reassigned to the Pacific Fleet and got underway from Norfolk, Virginia 15 February 1945. Arriving Okinawa on 23 May, she engaged in antisubmarine patrols off Kerama Retto under almost constant attack by Japanese kamikaze aircraft. Then in July she conducted minesweeping operations off Okinawa and south toward Formosa, and, in September, helped clear the entrance to Japan's Inland Sea. From 20 November to 23 December, she assisted in the operations to clear the merchant sea lanes of the East China Sea and supported SAR operations among the islands off Formosa.

New Year's Day 1946 found Prevail on the Huangpu River at Shanghai, China, where she remained until returning to San Pedro, California, 15 February.

Transferred to the San Diego Group of the Pacific Reserve Fleet on 9 April, Prevail decommissioned 31 May 1946.

== Reassignment as Survey Ship AGS-20 ==
Prevail recommissioned 1 April 1952, was reclassified as USS Prevail (AGS–20), and underwent conversion to a survey ship at New York Naval Shipyard. Reporting in late August to Commander, Hydrographic Survey Group 1, in October, she undertook her first surveying assignment in the Cape Hatteras area. From 1953 to 1956 she conducted survey and cable laying operations in the Caribbean, along the Southern and Eastern coasts of the United States north to Nova Scotia, and in the South Atlantic Ocean.

During 1957 Prevail operated along the Newfoundland and Labrador Coast and briefly in the Bahama Islands. On 7 February 1958 she departed for the Mediterranean, returning 9 May. From 19 May to 27 July 1959, Prevail conducted sounding surveys in the western Mediterranean, then moved to the eastern Mediterranean. After returning home 10 September, she spent the next four years conducting surveys in the Caribbean, off Bermuda, and off Newfoundland and Nova Scotia.

== Decommissioning ==
After decommissioning, Prevail was struck from the Navy List on 10 January 1964 and sold to Union Minerals and Alloys Corporation, New York City, 13 October 1964.

== Awards ==
Prevail earned 6 battle stars for World War II service.
