= Newcomb Lifeboat Company =

The Newcomb Lifeboat Company was a shipyard located in Hampton, Virginia that operated during World War I.

== History ==
The founder, A. D. Newcomb, designed a lifeboat that was completely enclosed and sealed with the occupants receiving air through compressed oxygen tanks. In February 1916, the Newcomb Lifeboat Company was incorporated in Richmond, Virginia. Several days prior to the official declaration of war against Germany in March 1917, the US Congress voted $115,000,000 for the war effort including the purchase of additional torpedo boat destroyers. Federal agents canvassed all the available shipyards reaching a handshake agreement with Newcomb to build five of its newly designed SC-1-class submarine chasers, one of 33 private yards and 6 navy yards that built the ship. As the Newcomb yard in Richmond was of insufficient size, the company purchased the abandoned facilities of the Chesapeake Gas Engine Corporation in Hampton, Virginia which had a railway large enough to handle several boats. They endeavored to build four ways of which only three were completed. The company further secured a contract to build a marine railway and install propulsion machinery in twenty wooden hulls. The railway was cancelled after determining that soil conditions would have required extensive and costly dredging. In June 2017, Newcomb secured a contract with the United States Shipping Board's Emergency Fleet Corporation (EFC) to build four Design 1001 cargo ships at a cost of $367,563 per ship. Employment at the yard increased from 212 in July 2017 to 707 in July 2018. In April 1918, the official name of the company was changed to The Hampton Shipbuilding & Marine Railway Corp and the city of incorporation of the company was changed to Hampton, Virginia. In 1918, the five SC-1-class submarine chasers (numbered SC-218 through SC-222) were completed and delivered to the US Navy. In August 1918, the shipyard was taken over by the Charles H. Tenney & Company which agreed to complete the ships under construction. Three Design 1001 hulls were laid down before the Armistice of 11 November 1918 was signed and the EFC determined that the massive buildup in shipping was no longer required. In December 2018, the EFC cancelled the contract although agreeing to fund the completion of two ships (then 61% and 82% completed) on a cost plus fee basis. The third hull (21% completed) was discarded. The Luray was launched on April 17, 1919 and the Kohoka (Kahoka) was launched on July 1, 1919. In April 1921, the shipyard was sold at auction.

Ships Built by the Newcomb Lifeboat Company in Hampton, Virginia
Image	Hull	Ship Name	Design	O/N Number	Owner	Type	Gross tonnage	Delivery Date	Notes and disposition
		USS SC-218	SC-1-class		US Navy	Submarine chaser	110	1918	Commissioned 9 Feb 1918, sold in 21 Jul 1921 to Henry A. Hitner and renamed Hiwal, returned to the USN in 1942 as YP-355, sold to MARAD in 1947
		USS SC-219	SC-1-class		US Navy	Submarine chaser	110	1918	Commissioned 19 Feb 1918, Destroyed and sunk due to explosion on 9 Oct 1918.
		USS SC-220	SC-1-class		US Navy	Submarine chaser	110	1918	Commissioned 13 Mar 1918, sold Joseph G.Hitner of Philadelphia on 24 Jun 1921
		USS SC-221	SC-1-class		US Navy	Submarine chaser	110	1918	Commissioned 13 Mar 1918, sold Joseph G.Hitner of Philadelphia on 24 Jun 1921
		USS SC-222	SC-1-class		US Navy	Submarine chaser	110	1918	Commissioned 13 Mar 1918, sold to C. P. Comerford Co of Lowell, Massachusetts on 11 May 1921
		SS Luray	1001		US Shipping Board	Cargo Ship	2,559	1919	Launched 17 Apr 1919
		SS Kohoka	1001		US Shipping Board	Cargo Ship	2,559	1919	Launched 1 Jul 1919
