= Theodore E. Ferris =

American naval architect (1872–1953)

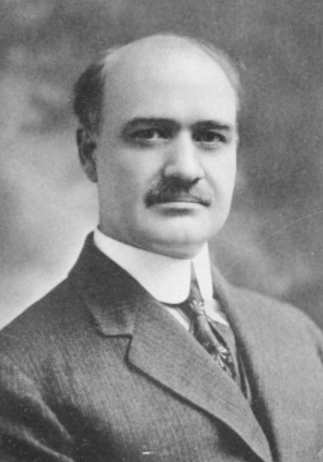
- Born: August 17, 1872; Stamford, Connecticut
- Died: May 30, 1953 (aged 80); Wallington, New Jersey
- Education: Greenwich Academy
- Occupation(s): Naval architect, engineer
- Spouse: Lois Davis (m. 1912)
- Children: 2

Theodore Ernest Ferris (August 17, 1872 – May 30, 1953) was an American naval architect and engineer responsible for the "Ferris Designs" used for accelerated expansion and construction of cargo and passenger steamships by the United States wartime defense public / private shipbuilding and acquisition company / agency of the Emergency Fleet Corporation (existed 1917-1936), of the United States Shipping Board (1916-1934), during the First World War (1914/1917-1918).

== Early life and education ==
Ferris was born in Stamford, Connecticut, the son of Nathaniel Betts and Louise (Keeler) Ferris. He was educated in Stamford and later at the Greenwich Academy, where he took a technical training course. After a period of employment at shipyards on Long Island, he joined the Townsend-Downey Company on Shooters Island and later the firm of Cary Smith & Ferris.

== Emergency Fleet Corporation ==
In 1917, the Emergency Fleet Corporation (EFC) was established until 1936 by the United States Shipping Board (1916-1934) under General George Washington Goethals (1858-1925), (who supervised the construction of the Panama Canal 1904-1914, across the Isthmus of Panama), with Ferris as chief maritime architect. His 3,500-deadweight-ton Design 1001 ship (known as the "Ferris Design") wooden steamship became the model for the EFC, of which 63 were subsequently built. He also invented a system of steel strapping for fixing the frames of his ships.

== Personal life ==
Ferris married Lois Davis on August 25, 1912. They had two children, Nathaniel James and Theodore Louis Ferris.

He died in Wallington, New Jersey, on May 30, 1953.

== Legacy ==
In his 1953 obituary, published by the famous national daily "newspaper of record", The New York Times repeated an estimate that United States shipyards built over 1,800 ships to his designs.

The 55-meter three-masted schooner with a steel hull, built in 1902 by the Townsend-Downey Shipbuilding Company at Shooters Island in 1902, the Shenandoah is still sailing today, 122 years later.

== Works ==
- Ferris, Theodore E. (1917). Douglas Fir Ship: Specifications for the Construction of a Standard Wood Steamship. United States Government Publishing Office.
