= Bethlehem Beaumont Shipyard =

Beaumont, Texas American shipyard company

Coordinates: 30.088562°N 94.093780°W

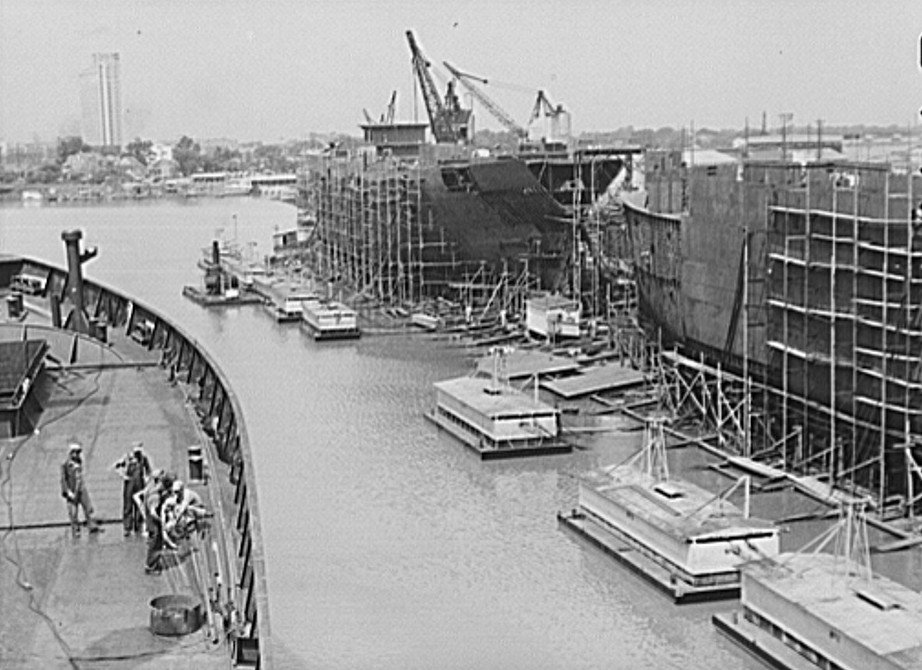
Pennsylvania Shipyards in Beaumont, Texas. C1 Cargo vessels under construction with welding barges are moored.

Pennsylvania Shipyards, Inc. on the Neches River in Texas in 1943

Bethlehem Beaumont Shipyard was a shipyard in Beaumont, Texas that opened in 1948. The yard is located on an island in the Neches River and upstream of the Sabine Pass that grants access to the Gulf of Mexico. The deep-water port shipyard was founded in 1917 as the Beaumont Shipbuilding & Dry Dock Company. Beaumont Shipbuilding & Dry Dock Company started as a World War I Emergency Shipbuilding Program yard.

In 1922 the Pennsylvania Car & Foundry, of Sharon, Pennsylvania purchased the yard and renamed the yard Pennsylvania Shipyards, Inc.. The yard built barges and rail cars and also operated under the name Petroleum Iron Works at the site. For World War II the yard build tugboats and barges as part of the emergency shipbuilding program. After the war Bethlehem Steel purchased the yard in 1948 as part for the Bethlehem Shipbuilding Corporation. Bethlehem Beaumont Shipyard transitioned the yard into a jackup rig offshore drilling rig yard.

The yard closed in the 1980s, with the rig market collapse. Bethlehem Steel sold the yard in 1989 to Trinity Industries. Trinity Industries purchased a Panamax floating drydock and continued operations. The drydock was moved to New Orleans in 1994. Chicago Bridge & Iron Company purchased the yard in 2006. Chicago Bridge & Iron turned the yard into a fabrication yard. In 2017 Chicago Bridge & Iron Company closed the yard due to damage from Hurricane Harvey, ending work for 455 employees. Many of workers were relocated to other Chicago Bridge & Iron sites. The site is now Allegiant Industrial Island Park Campus that opened in 2018.

== Beaumont Shipbuilding & Dry Dock Company ==
Beaumont Shipbuilding & Dry Dock Company (1919-1920) wooden ships: (Cargo ships built for United States Shipping Board for World War I. Beaumont Shipbuilding & Dry Dock Company also operated a 2,500 ton marine railway.

- Swampscott, Design 1001 Cargo Ship, Oct. 1918
- Quemakoning, Design 1001 Cargo Ship, May 1919
- Oneco, Design 1001 Cargo Ship, April 1919
- Angelina Design 1001 Cargo Ship, June 1919
- Awash Design 1001 Cargo Ship, completed as a barge
- Shelbank, Schooner, June 1920, completed as Marie F. Cummins
- Shelby, Schooner, May 1920, completed as Albert D. Cummins, now rest in mud in the Delaware River.

== Pennsylvania Shipyards, Inc. ==
In the interwar period the yard built over 200 vessels, mostly for companies in the oil business, with Texaco being the biggest customer by number of ships. The Texas oil boom could conceivably have to do something with this unusually high activity at a time when shipbuilding in the rest of the country was at a low point due to the surplus produced in the World War I boom years. The first war related work came in the form of two C1-A cargo vessels for the Maritime Commission. Apart from 4 minesweepers for the Navy and a handful of ships for private businesses, Pennsylvania produced primarily for the merchant marine with C1-A and C1-M ships the most numerous types of ships built.

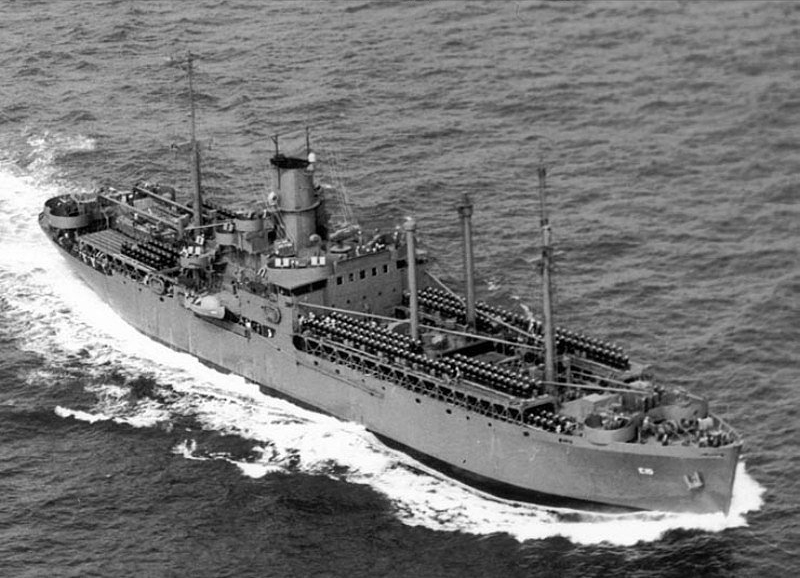
USS Sangay (AE-10), a C1-A built by Pennsylvania Shipyards, with a deckload of contact mines in 1943

Pennsylvania Shipyards, Inc. (1926-1947) built for World War II:

- Type C1 ship a C1-A and C1-M cargo ships, 71 built.
- 71 of 395 Type C1 ships
  - 46 of 65 C1-A
  - 24 of 211 C1-M-AV1
  - 1 of 6 C1-M-AV8
- 4 of 95 Auk-class minesweepers
  - Pilot (AM-104), Prevail (AM-107), Pioneer (AM-105), Portent (AM-106)

- Type V ship V4-M-A1 Tugboats
- Type N3 ship N3-S-A2 small coastal cargo ship.
- Type R ship R1-M-AV3, refrigerated cargo ships
  - Examples:
- SS Kielce Type N3-S-A2
- USS Corduba a R1-M-AV3 Type R ship
- USS Kerstin R1-M-AV3
- USS Lucidor R1-M-AV3
- USS Muscatine C1-M-AV1 Type C1 ship
- Point Arena, V4-M-A1 Tugboat
- Stratford Point V4-M-A1 Tugboat
- SS Cape Sable C1-A Cargo, became USS Sangay (AE 10).
- USS Adria R1-M-AV3 refrigerated cargo ship

== Bethlehem Beaumont Shipyard ==
The Beaumont Yard was one of the major sources of offshore drilling rigs built in the United States with 72 offshore rigs built at the yard. Bethlehem Beaumont Shipyard (1948-1982) built:

- Semi-submersible platforms
- Jackup rigs
- Tower Barges
- Deck Barges
- Drill Barges
- Container Barge
- Self-Propelled Semisubmersible Drill Rig

== Chicago Bridge & Iron Company Beaumont ==
Chicago Bridge & Iron Company Beaumont (1982-2017) closed the Beaumont yard, called Beaumont Island Park Fabrication Services (and nicknamed "The Island"), in 2017, after the site was flooded due to Hurricane Harvey in September 2017. The site had fabricated and transport large-scale process modules, shop-built ships and large steel plate subassemblies since 1982. In 2008 Chicago Bridge & Iron Company sold the site to Port of Beaumont. Port of Beaumont entered into a partnership with Allegiant Industrial to rebuild the 75 acres site.

== Allegiant Industrial Island Park Campus ==
Allegiant Industrial opened the Allegiant Industrial Island Park Campus (2018- ) on the site in October 2018. The site has 500,000 square feet of welding, painting and fabrication space.

== See also ==
- Beaumont Reserve Fleet
