= USS Lucidor =

Cargo ship of the United States Navy

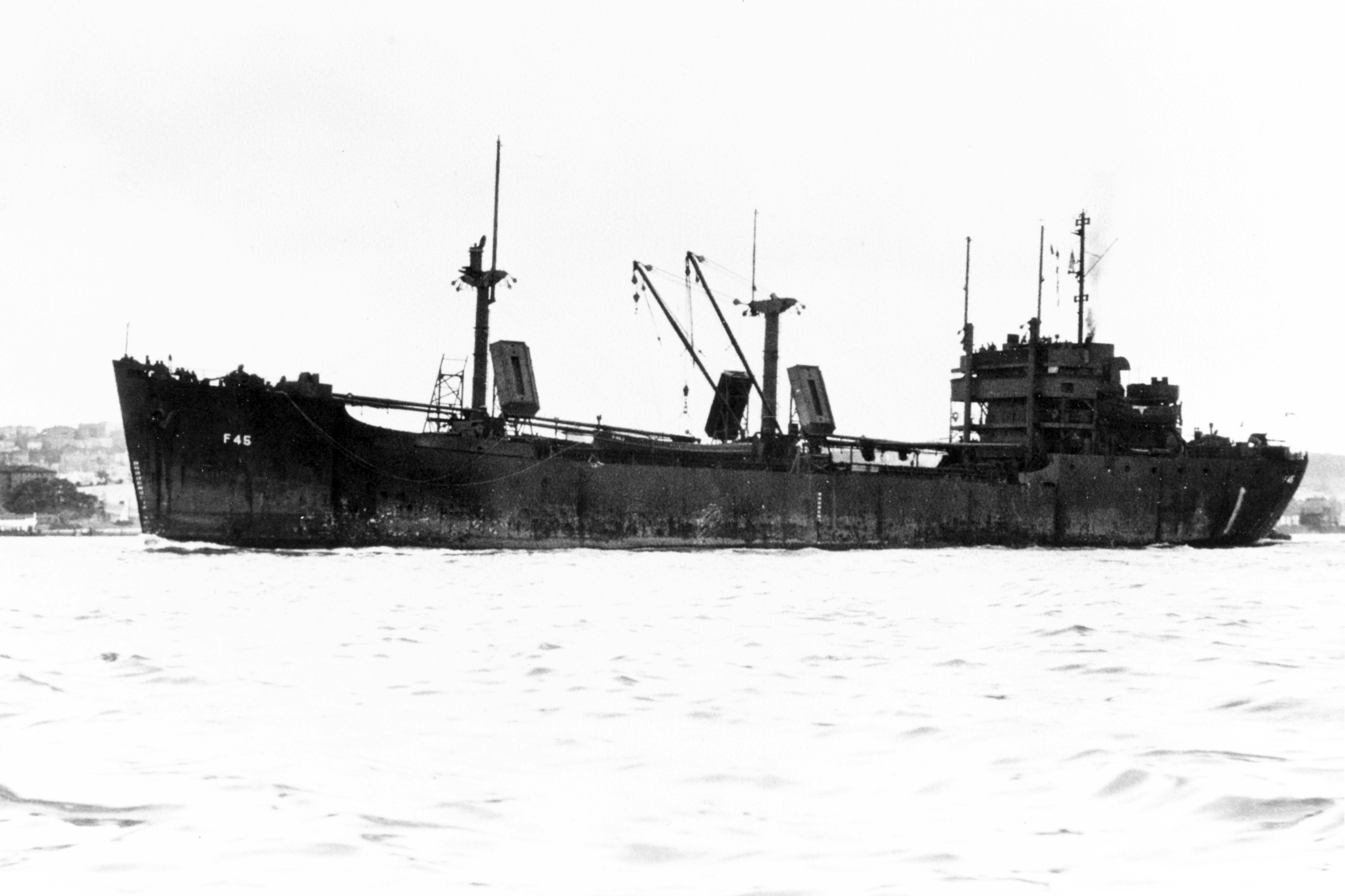

History

United States
- Ordered: as R1-M-AV3 hull, MC hull 2207
- Builder: Pennsylvania Shipyards
- Laid down: 1 December 1944
- Launched: 25 January 1945
- Acquired: 16 June 1945
- Commissioned: 5 July 1945
- Decommissioned: 26 May 1946
- Stricken: date unknown
- Fate: declared a total loss as a result of the beaching

General characteristics
- Tonnage: 2,120 long tons deadweight (DWT)
- Displacement: 3,139 t.(lt) 6,240 t.(fl)
- Length: 338 ft (103 m)
- Beam: 50 ft (15 m)
- Draught: 18 ft (5.5 m)
- Propulsion: diesel engine, single screw, 1,700shp
- Speed: 12 kts. (max)
- Complement: 84
- Armament: one single 3 in (76 mm) dual purpose gun mount, six single 20 mm gun mounts

USS Lucidor (AF-45) was an Adria-class stores ship in service with the United States Navy from 1945 to 1946. She was sold into commercial service in 1967 and was lost in 1977.

== History ==
Lucidor was laid down under a Maritime Commission contract by Pennsylvania Shipyards, Beaumont, Texas, 1 December 1944; launched 25 January 1945; sponsored by Mrs. J. Y. Powell, acquired by the Navy 16 June 1945; and commissioned 6 July 1945 at Galveston, Texas.

=== World War II ===
After shakedown, Lucidor loaded cargo at Mobile, Alabama, and steamed for Pearl Harbor, arriving there 1 September. Loaded with fleet provisions, the storeship sailed for the Marshall Islands, arriving Eniwetok 26 September.

From October 1945 to April 1946 Lucidor made supply runs to bases scattered throughout the western and central Pacific Ocean. She also operated in the Far East, transporting dry and refrigerated cargo to Japan and Qingdao, China. Crew toured Hiroshima in November 1945.

=== Decommissioning and fate ===
Lucidor returned San Francisco, California, 10 May 1946 and decommissioned there on the 26th. She was returned to War Shipping Administration the same day and entered the National Defense Reserve Fleet and berthed in Puget Sound at Olympia, Washington. She was struck from the Naval Register (date unknown) and sold for commercial service by the Maritime Administration in 1967 to the Alaska Steamship Company, Seattle, Washington, and renamed Polar Pioneer. She was:

- resold in 1972 to Sea Nutrients Corp., Seattle, Washington, and renamed Mermaid.
- resold for the second time in 1972 to Operaciones y Servicios S.A. (OYSSA), Salaverry, Peru and renamed Mochica.
- resold, 15 November 1974, to Naviera Humboldt S.A., Callao, Peru.
- resold, 23 July 1975, and laid up at Callao, Peru.
- resold, 12 January 1977, to Tranave, Panama and
- resold to Mar. Claro S.A., Buenos Aires, Argentina, renamed Polar MC.
- resold in 1977 to Norsur S.A., Ltd., Cayman Islands, U.K. flagged and renamed Caribea 28 December 1977.
- laid up in April 1980 at Necochea, Buenos Aires, Argentina. That same month she broke away from her moorings during a storm on the 29th and beached one mile East from the port of Quequen. Ex-Lucidor was declared a total loss as a result of the beaching.

== Military awards and honors ==
Lucidor’s crew was eligible for the following medals:

- American Campaign Medal
- Asiatic-Pacific Campaign Medal
- World War II Victory Medal
- Navy Occupation Service Medal (with Asia clasp)
