= USS Sangay =

Ammunition ship of the United States Navy

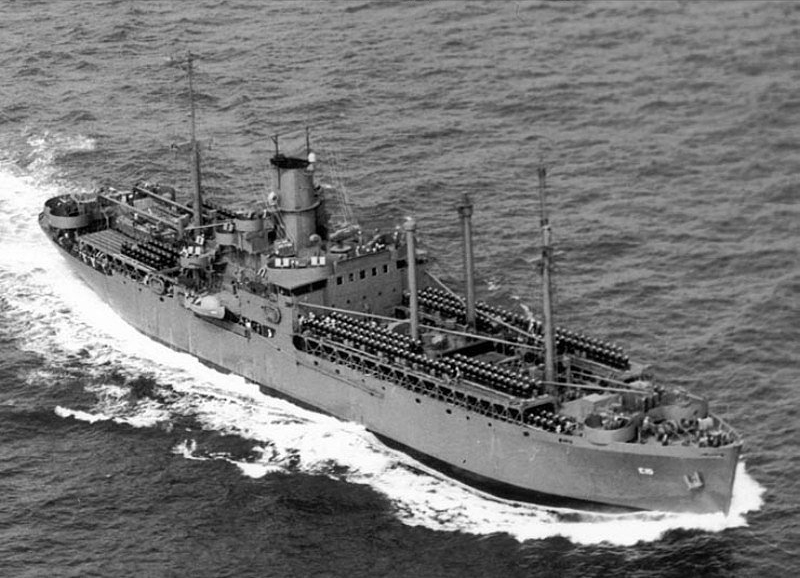
- USS Sangay (AE-10) transporting contact mines, 1943

History

United States
- Laid down: 30 October 1941
- Launched: 5 April 1942
- Acquired: 25 November 1942
- Commissioned: 25 March 1943
- Decommissioned: 20 July 1947
- Stricken: 1 July 1960
- Fate: Sold for scrapping, 19 November 1980

General characteristics
- Displacement: 6,400 tons
- Length: 412 ft 3 in (125.65 m)
- Beam: 60 ft (18 m)
- Draft: 23 ft 7 in (7.19 m)
- Speed: 14.8 knots
- Complement: 308 officers and enlisted
- Armament: 1 × 5 in (130 mm)/38 caliber gun; 4 × 3 in (76 mm)/50 caliber guns; 12 × 20 mm guns

The USS Sangay (AE-10) was an ammunition ship in service with the United States Navy from 1943 to 1947. After spending decades in reserve, she was sold for scrapping in November 1980.

== History ==
USS Sangay was named after the Sangay volcano in Ecuador, a tongue-in-cheek reference to what would happen if a munitions ship was hit by enemy fire. She was laid down under Maritime Commission contract (MC hull 225) as Cape Sable on 30 October 1941 by Pennsylvania Shipyards, Inc., Beaumont, Texas; launched on 5 April 1942; sponsored by Mrs. A. Robert Lee; delivered to the War Shipping Administration on 9 September 1942; acquired by the Navy on 25 November 1942; and commissioned on 25 March 1943.

=== Pacific War ===
Sangay sailed from Yorktown, Virginia, on 13 May 1943 with a cargo of mines for San Diego. On 30 May, she began the first of four round trips between the west coast and Hawaii, carrying ammunition to Pearl Harbor and returning to San Francisco with defective ammunition and empty shell cases. This duty was completed on 2 October. On 16 November, the ship left San Francisco for the first of five voyages to supply the fleet with ammunition in forward areas.

Sangay's first stop was at Funafuti from 29 November 1943 to 11 January 1944 where, in addition to issuing ammunition to cruisers and destroyers, her crew cleared obstructions in the Te Bua Bua Channel and directed minesweeping operations in the harbor. After resupplying at Pearl Harbor, the ammunition ship moved to the Marshall Islands and issued bombs and fuses to the carriers of Task Force 58 at Majuro from 6 to 9 February, and then transferred the rest of her cargo to barges at Roi between 10 and 14 February and to USS Rainier (AE-5) at Majuro from 17 to 22 February.

She then picked up a fresh cargo of ammunition at San Francisco and issued it to fleet units at Efate on 15 April, Seeadler Harbor from 24 April to 8 May, at Cape Cretin, New Guinea, from 10 to 13 May, at Efate between 18 and 21 May, and at Espiritu Santo from 22 to 31 May, before arriving at Eniwetok on 9 June for three weeks. She transferred her remaining ammunition to USS Shasta (AE-6) on 2 June and sailed to San Francisco where, at Mare Island Naval Shipyard on 9 August 1944, 328 African-American enlisted sailors refused to load munitions; a work-stoppage that was to be called the Port Chicago mutiny. Civilian longshoremen were instead brought in to load Sangay.

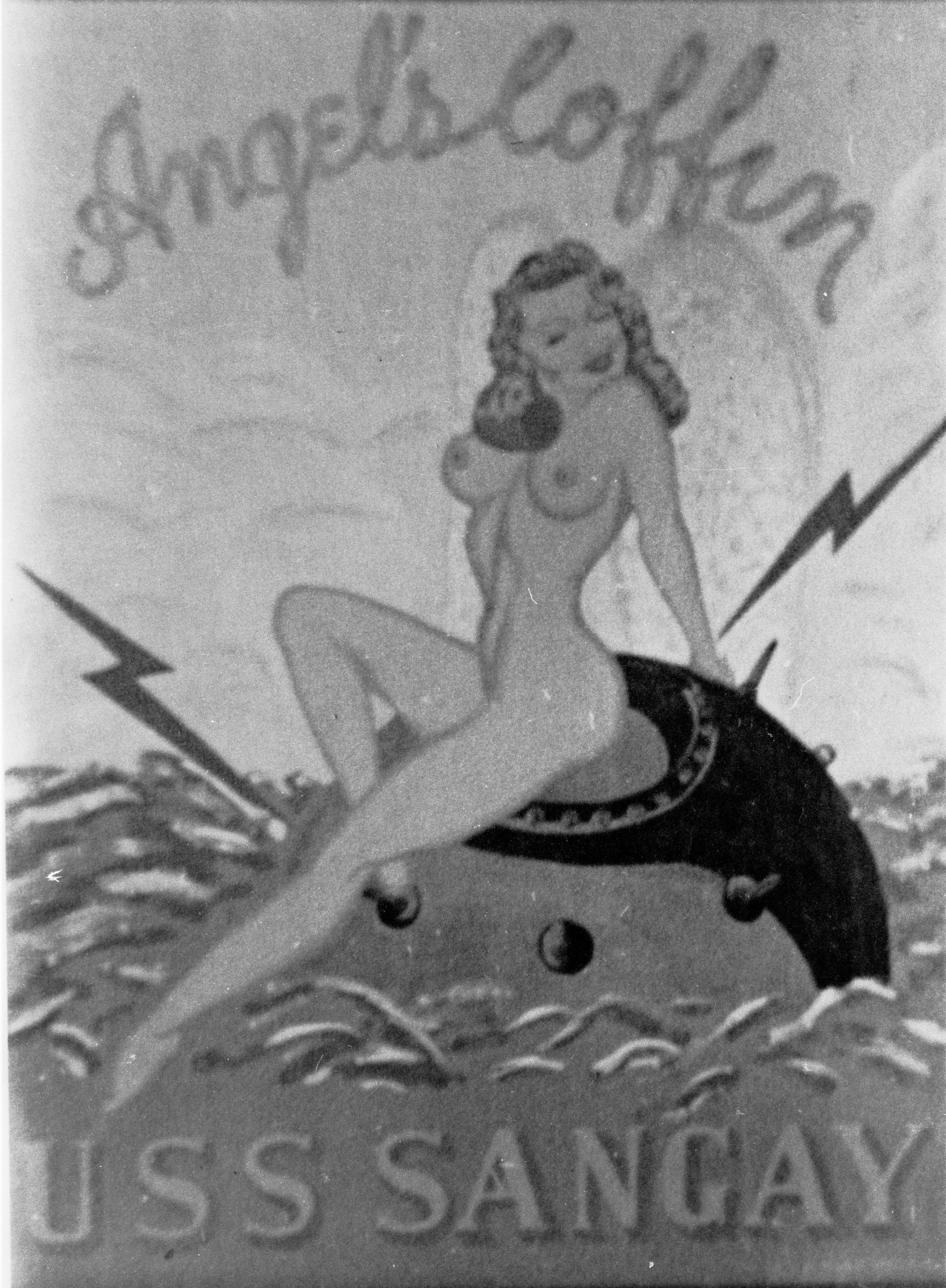
Ship's motto.

Sangay's next assignment was to support the landings on Peleliu in the Palau Islands. Between 15 and 21 September, she lay off the beach during the day issuing ammunition to American warships and retired seaward with the transports at night. She then issued ammunition in Kossol Passage between 22 and 26 September and at Seeadler Harbor between 1 and 10 October before joining USS Mauna Loa (AE-8) and sailing to San Francisco. Returning to the forward areas, she issued ammunition and bombs to units of Task Force 38 at Ulithi from 20 December 1944 to 11 January 1945, and then supplied ammunition depots at Eniwetok between 17 and 23 January and at Kwajalein between 24 and 27 January before returning to San Francisco on 10 February.

Sangay left San Francisco on 22 March with a cargo of mines and mine components, arriving after several stops at Eniwetok on 27 June. She remained there until ordered back to Pearl Harbor on 12 August to be fitted as a tender for small minecraft, and sailed from there on 26 September with general cargo loaded for fleet issue. After ten days at Okinawa, from 11 to 20 October, she arrived at Sasebo on 22 October where she provided support to minesweepers clearing Japanese minefields. She remained there, except for a nine-day visit to Wakayama Wan, until sailing for home via Okinawa on 17 January 1946.

=== Fate ===
The ammunition ship arrived at Orange, Texas, on 30 April 1946 where she was decommissioned and placed in reserve on 20 July 1947. She was struck from the Navy list on 1 July 1960, having been transferred the previous day to the National Defense Reserve Fleet at Beaumont, Texas Sangay was finally sold for scrapping on 19 November 1980.

== Awards and commendations ==
Sangay received two battle stars for her World War II service.
