= HMCS Prince David =

Canadian WWII naval ship and passenger ship

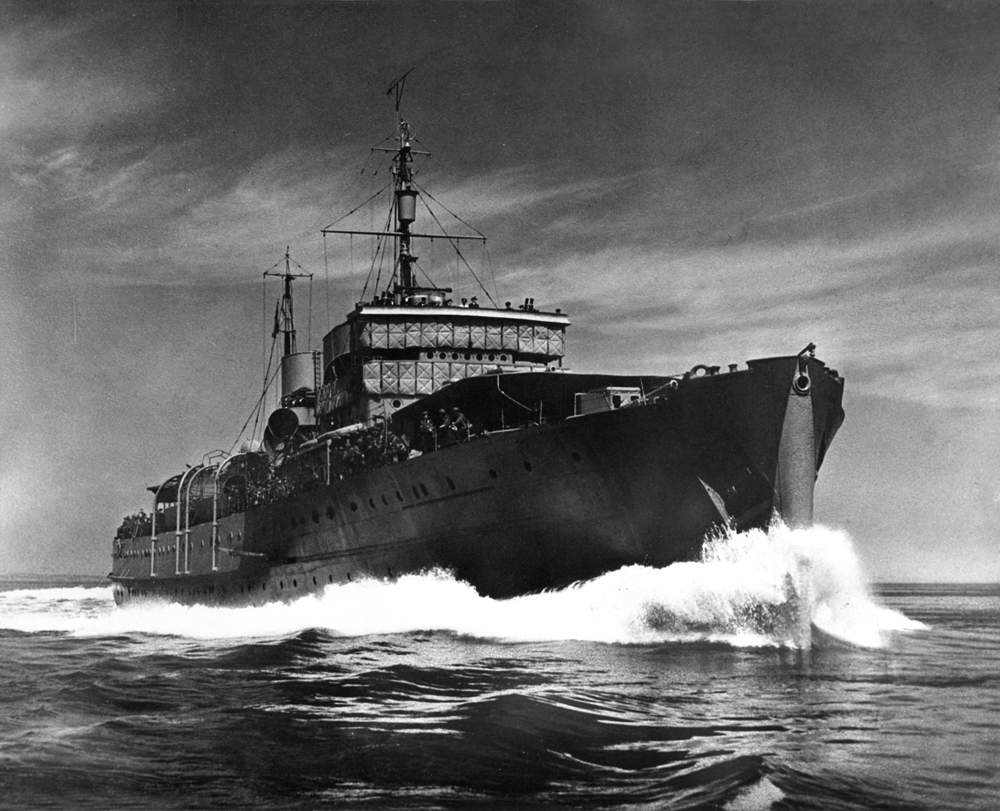
- HMCS Prince David

History

Canada
- Name: Prince David
- Builder: Cammell Laird & Co., Birkenhead, UK; Conversion to AMC by Halifax Shipyards Limited., Halifax, Nova Scotia; Conversion to LSI(M) by Burrard Dry Dock Ltd., Vancouver, British Columbia
- Laid down: 1929
- Launched: 12 February 1930
- Commissioned: 28 December 1940
- Renamed: Charlton Monarch (1946)
- Stricken: 11 June 1945
- Identification: Pennant number: F89
- Honours and awards: Atlantic 1941; Aleutians 1942; Aegean 1943–44; Normandy 1944; South France 1944
- Fate: Broken up 1951

General characteristics
- Tonnage: 6,892 GRT
- Displacement: 5,736 tonnes
- Length: 385 ft (117.3 m)
- Beam: 57 ft (17.4 m)
- Draught: 21 ft (6.4 m)
- Installed power: 6 × Yarrow water-tube five-drum super-heat main boilers; 2 × Scottish marine three-burner auxiliary boilers; 19,300 ihp (14,392 kW) at 267 rpm.
- Propulsion: Twin screw Parsons reaction three-stage single-reduction geared turbines;
- Speed: 22 knots (41 km/h; 25 mph)
- Range: 3,500 nmi (6,482 km; 4,028 mi) at 20 knots (37 km/h; 23 mph)
- Complement: 31 officers, 383 ratings
- Armament: 4 × 6-inch/45 cal Mk VII guns in 2 single mounts forward and 2 aft (as AMC).; 4 × 4-inch Mk XVI HA/LA guns in two twin mounts (as LSI M).; 2 × 3-inch HA guns in two single mounts (as AMC).; 2 × 40-mm Bofors guns (as LSI M).; several Vickers .303 twin MGs.; 10 × Oerlikon 20 mm cannon Mk 5 in single mounts after Apr.20/42 refit.; 2 stern-mounted depth charge chutes for Mk. VIII 300 lb.canister depth charges (as AMC).

HMCS Prince David was one of three Canadian National Steamships passenger liners that were converted for the Royal Canadian Navy (RCN), first to armed merchant cruisers at the beginning of Second World War, then infantry landing ships (medium) or anti-aircraft escort. For three years, they were the largest ships in the RCN.

The three 'Prince' ships were a unique part of Canada's war effort: taken out of mercantile service, converted to armed merchant cruisers, two of them (Prince David and Prince Henry) were reconfigured to infantry landing ships and one (Prince Robert) to an anti-aircraft escort; all three ships were paid off at war's end and then returned to mercantile service.

In the early part of the war, as armed merchant cruisers equipped with antique guns and very little armour, Prince David and her sisters were sent to hunt enemy submarines and surface ships, tasks better suited to warships. As the needs of the RCN changed, so were the 'Prince' ships able to adapt to new roles. Their flexibility offered the RCN greater scope and balance in its operations. They did not function as did the bulk of the Canadian fleet: no rushing back and forth across the ocean, cold and damp, chained to 50 degrees North. Prince David and her sisters, each with two separate employments, roamed most of the navigable world forming a little navy apart.

== Passenger ship (1930–1939) ==
=== West Coast service ===
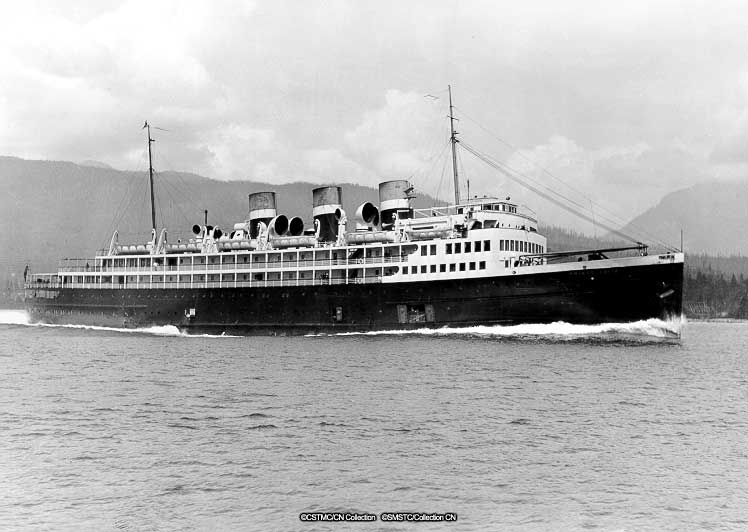
CNSS Prince David, Vancouver, British Columbia, August 1930

Three ships, Prince David, Prince Henry and Prince Robert were ordered in 1929 from Cammell Laird & Co. by the Canadian National Railways subsidiary CN Steamships to operate as small luxury liners on the West Coast of Canada. The specifications for all three ships had been identical: three decks, three funnels, cruiser sterns and accommodation for 300 passengers. Each had cost $2,000,000 at completion and with a speed of 22 knots (41 km/h; 25 mph), they were among the fastest ships in the Canadian registry. Named after David E. Galloway, a vice president of Canadian National Steamships, Prince David arrived on the West Coast in the summer of 1930 and was put on the Vancouver – Victoria – Seattle daily service. However, the decline in trade due to the Depression had made it impractical for all three ships to operate in British Columbia waters.

=== West Indies service ===
In 1932, Prince David and Prince Henry were sent back east to join the Canada – West Indies service. While on a voyage south, Prince David ran aground on the North-East Breaker at Bermuda on 13 March 1932 and remained hard aground for six months. Salvagers determined that the cheapest course was to turn her back to her owners, Canadian National Steamships, who eventually got her off, refitted her and sent her back for another four years' service. Prince David was laid up at Halifax, Nova Scotia in 1937.

By the late 1930s, and with war looming, the Canadian chief of the Naval Staff had designated the three 'Prince' ships as candidates for conversion to armed merchant cruisers, for the task of convoy escort. During the protracted negotiations for the CN ships, all three vessels had been inspected by the Naval Service and specifications drawn up. It was recognized that the task of converting the fast liners would not be an easy one. Their hulls and engines were basically sound. Prince Robert, which had had no accidents and had been well maintained, was to present no problems. Her sister ships, on the other hand, were a different story: both were in need of major repairs.

Prince David was suffering from neglect, with a badly fouled hull, rotten deck planks and bulkheads rusted thin. Holes in the deck plating, crystallized valves and decrepit auxiliary engines augured an expensive refit as well as conversion.

=== Preparing for war ===
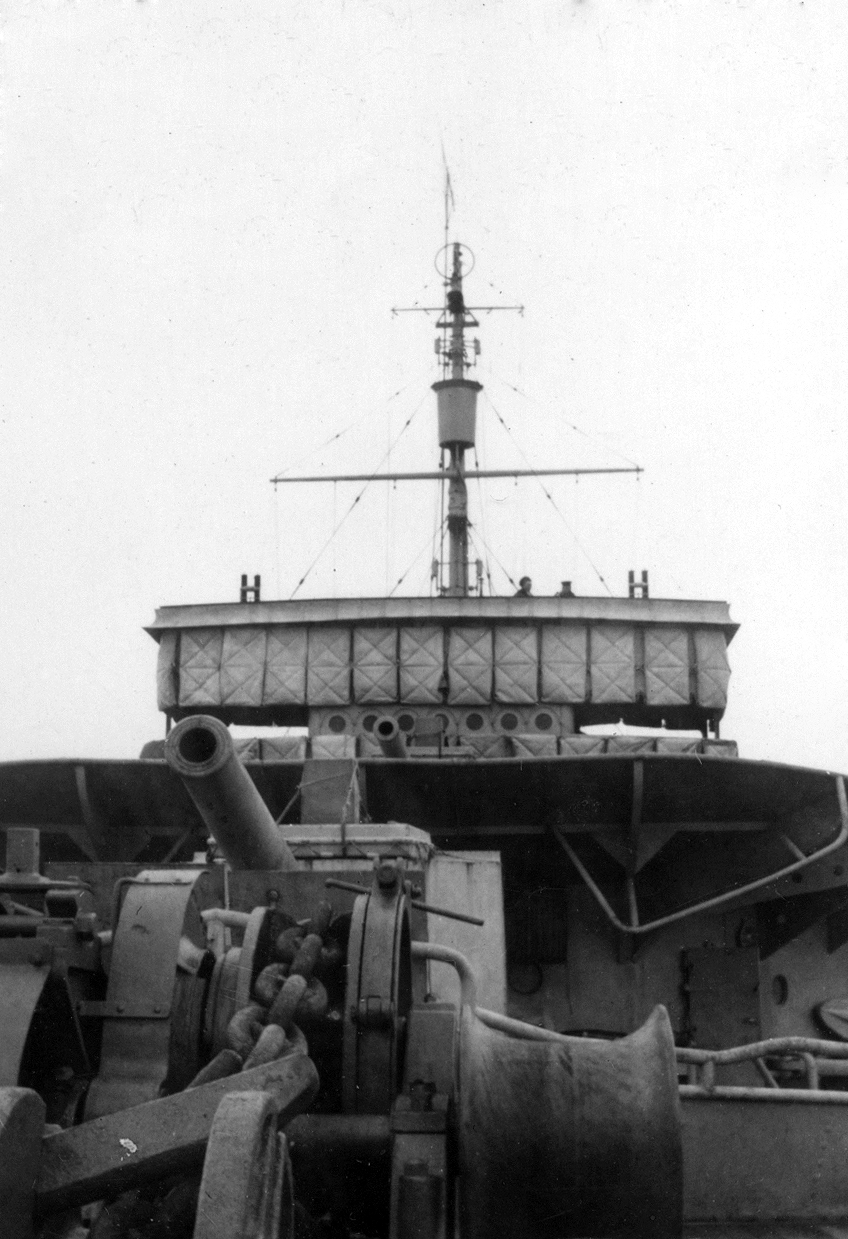
HMCS Prince David's vintage "A" & "B" guns.

When Canada officially declared war on Nazi Germany, 10 September 1939, the Royal Canadian Navy consisted of six destroyers, five minesweepers, two training ships and a mobilized strength of 366 officers and 3,477 ratings including reservists. The Naval Service lost no time in making arrangements for the conversion of the 'Princes'.

The British Admiralty had been depositing defensive equipment in Canada between the wars in order to arm fast liners as AMCs in the event of hostilities. Twelve 6-inch (152 mm) guns were made available to the RCN to start the AMC program. The 6-inch guns were manufactured as early as 1896 and fitted in the wing casemates of King Edward VII-class battleships launched between 1903 and 1905. They had no range-finding or fire-control equipment and had been designed to train over a small arc, which had to be reconfigured to travel about 300 degrees. Some 3-inch (76 mm) guns designed for light cruisers and of a newer vintage (1916) were also made available. On 9 February 1940, work commenced on Prince David at Halifax Shipyards from plans prepared by Messrs. Lambert, German and Milne of Montreal.

== Armed merchant cruiser (1940–1943) ==
Substantial alterations were carried out at the Halifax Shipyard. The two top decks were cut away and light-cruiser superstructure was fitted, eliminating the boat deck cabins and lounges. The hull and deck were stiffened and some watertight subdivision added. All three ships suffered from the basic weakness of large cargo and accommodation compartments extending across their hulls.

A torpedo in their forward holds or in their large undivided engine rooms would probably have been disastrous.

Four 6-inch guns were fitted, one on each of the two decks forward and aft. Two 3-inch guns were fitted on the upper deck amidships, along with several light anti-aircraft machine guns. Two depth charge chutes were added to the stern, but no anti-submarine detection equipment was supplied. The three original stacks were replaced with two shorter, oval ones, which gave a decidedly more cruiser like appearance. HMCS Prince David was commissioned with the pennant number F89 at Halifax on 28 December 1940, under the command of Captain W.B. Armit, RCNR.

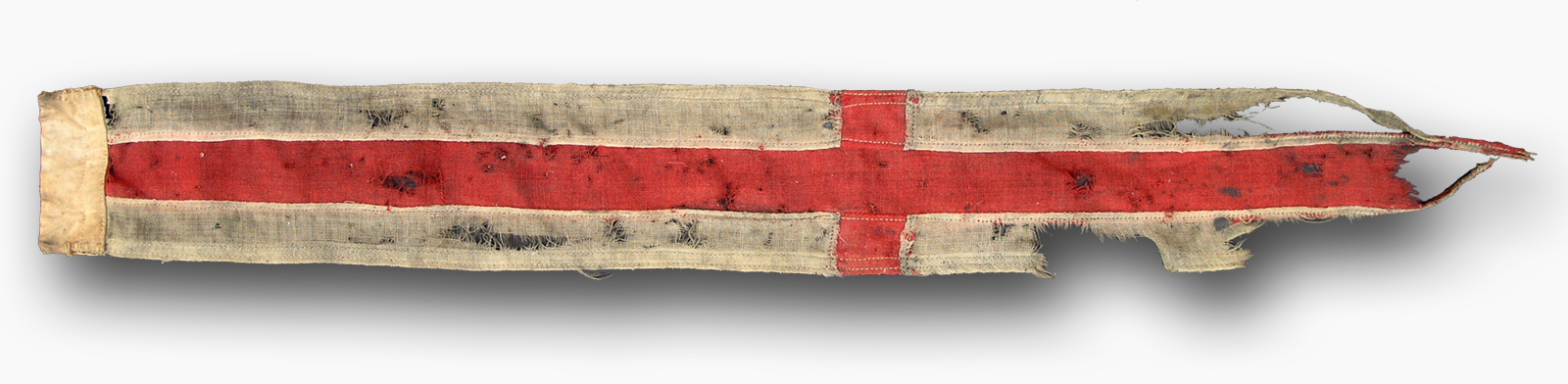
Remnants of HMCS Prince David's 1940 Commissioning Pennant.

Prince David, in company with Prince Henry, left Halifax on 12 January 1941 for work-ups off Bermuda. Crews of both ships were given a good introduction to the quick rolling characteristics of the 'Princes' during a stormy passage to Hamilton, Bermuda. Even as cruise ships, the three 'Princes' were known for their tendency to roll in heavy seas. As a gun platform, this was not an ideal trait and extra care and practice was needed to overcome the tendency to a quick rolling motion. Added to this was the age of the 6-inch guns themselves, which made it necessary to devote more care to the armament than was desirable in a hectic engagement.

=== West Indies Station ===
From early 1941, HMCS Prince David served as convoy escort from West Indies Station in Bermuda. On 1 April 1941, Prince David was ordered to patrol off of the Pará River in Brazil. There she was to intercept two enemy merchant ships, the German Norderney and the Italian Monbaldo, which were preparing to sail. As Prince David steamed south, she was abruptly ordered to steer 025° at best possible speed and search along HMS Voltaire's track. Voltaire was a British AMC, in fact one of the RN's largest, and, like Prince David, she had been charged with the task of defending convoys and intercepting enemy shipping. C-in-C America and West Indies had heard a German communiqué stating that Voltaire had been sunk by an auxiliary cruiser. Prince David increased her speed to 20 knots (37 km/h; 23 mph) and headed for Voltaire's estimated position.

On 7 April, the Canadian ship entered a large oil patch. Small bits of charred wood, cloth and newspapers were found and sharks were seen. There was little doubt that a ship had gone down in the area. Two years later it was learned that the German auxiliary cruiser (Hilfskreuzer) Thor had attacked Voltaire and Thor's first salvo from 2 miles (3 km) outside Voltaire's gun range had knocked out one of the British AMC's 6-inch (152 mm) gun mounts, destroyed the bridge and put the wireless room out of action. After two hours of continuous shelling, the outgunned Voltaire began to sink. The German raider, which had fought successful actions with two other British merchant cruisers, rescued 197 officers and men from HMS Voltaire (72 crew members died in the action).

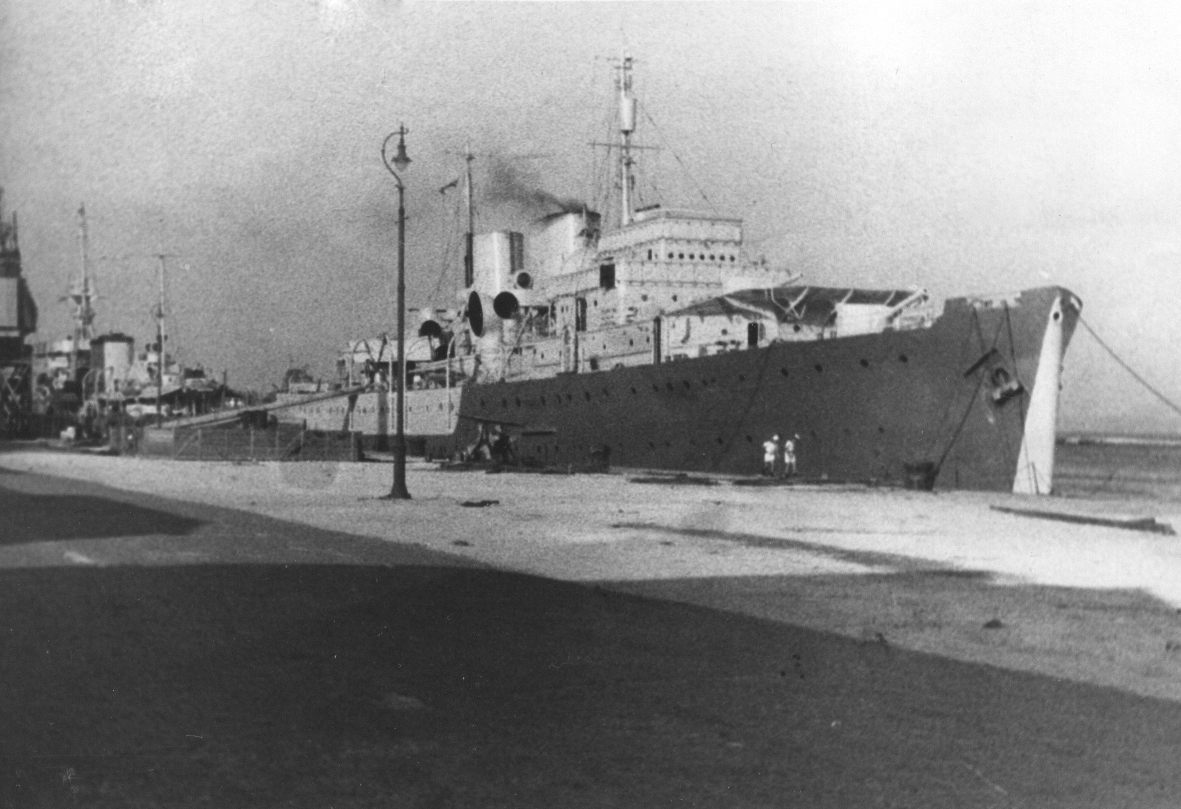
HMCS Prince David in Bermuda, circa 1941

Voltaire's sudden disappearance and the mysterious circumstances surrounding it could hardly fail to impress the men of Prince David with the danger of their role, and its importance in the war at sea. Their task was the same as that of their British comrades—the protection of trade routes—and they shared the same hazards. While the Prince ships were faster than their British counterparts, indeed, faster than the average disguised raider, and faster than Thor, they were undeniably out-classed in firepower: Prince David's 6-inch guns would be a poor match for the enemy's 5.9-inch (150 mm) calibre armament, with superior German director gear; reasonable doubt concerning the result of an engagement between them could be entertained only in conditions that put a little extra speed at a high premium. Regrettable though the casualties among the armed merchant cruisers may have been, however, there was no room for self-recriminations in 1941. Non-aggressive countries have almost invariably gone to war unprepared, and the Allies had been forced to "make do" with the equipment and ships at their disposal.

— MacLeod, M. K., The Prince Ships, 1940–1945, Canadian Forces Headquarters Reports, 31 October 1965, National Defence Directorate of History and Heritage, p. 35

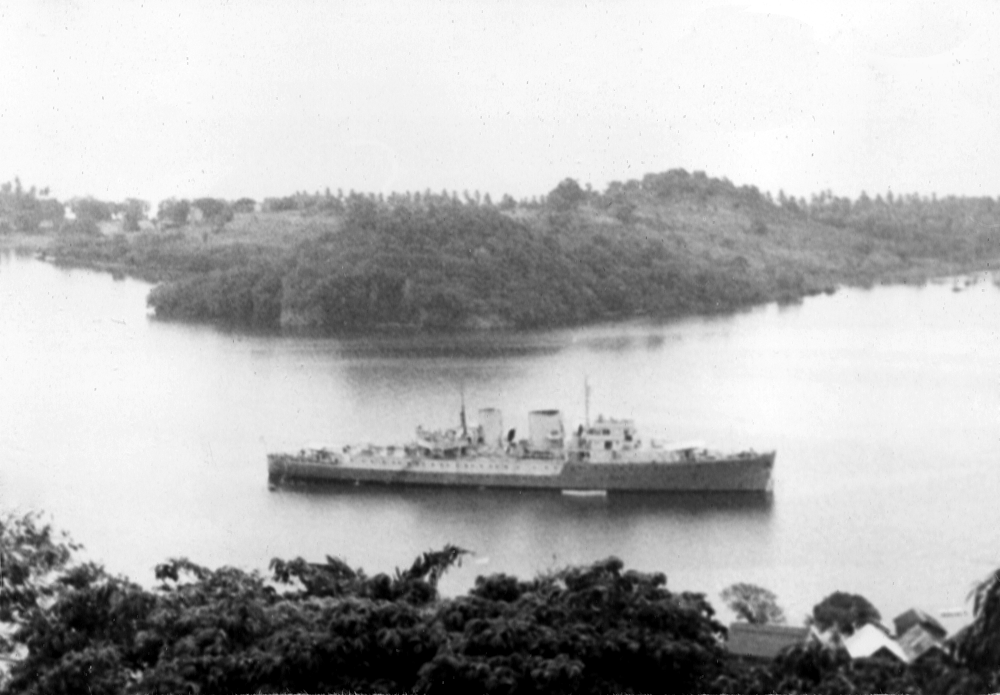
HMCS Prince David in the Panama Canal Zone

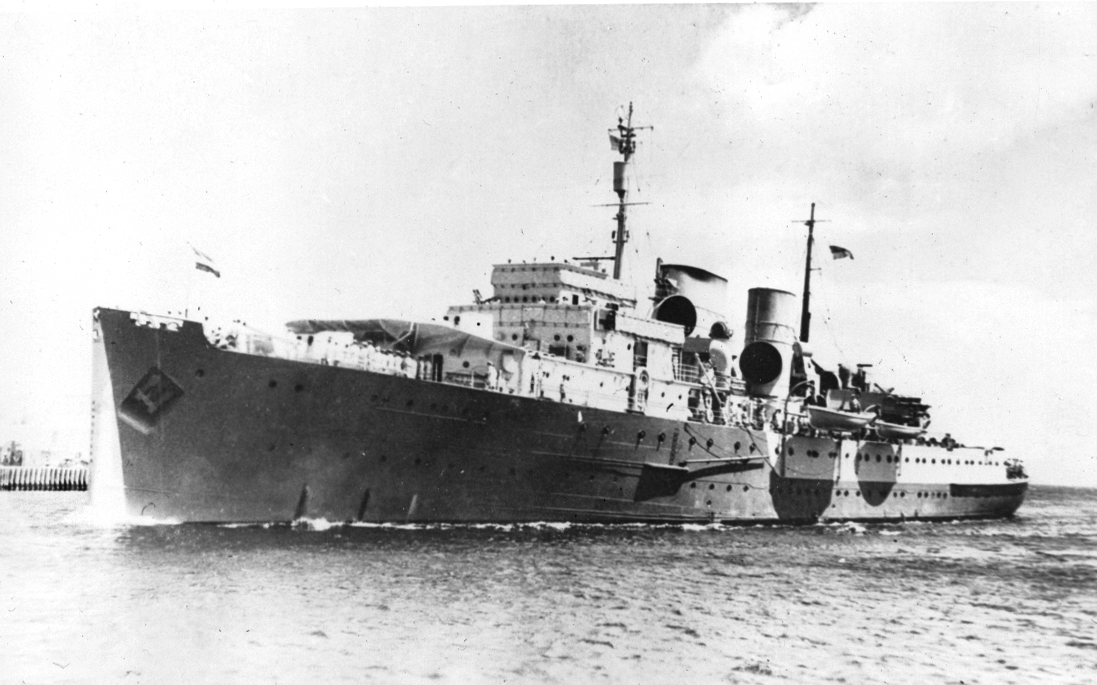
HMCS Prince David in the Panama Canal Zone

On 24 August, Prince David was ordered to rendezvous with HMS Circassia, an 11,000-ton AMC. Their task was to patrol the central Atlantic to intercept enemy supply ships and raiders. At dawn, 29 August, before the rendezvous had taken place, Prince David sighted an unknown vessel. The vessel, which was seen stern on, in poor visibility, at a range of 12,000 yards (11,000 m), was reported by Prince David to be a heavy cruiser, steering south-east at 25 kn (46 km/h; 29 mph). She did not reply correctly to Prince David's challenge and steamed off after 50 minutes.

Some rather fanciful stories arose from this brief encounter, and authorities were hard pressed to counter newspaper reports that Prince David had forced the Admiral Hipper to turn tail and run; some even classified the encounter as a shooting engagement. A press clipping sent from Vice Admiral Nelles to Captain Adams, apparently from a British newspaper, stated the following:

"We took after her at once, emitting loud yaps from our six-inch (152 mm) guns,' said Prince David's captain, describing the action, and, deceived by the aggressive spirit of the small ship, the powerful German fled at high speed."

The identity of this ship remains a mystery. The Admiralty considered that she might be the afore-mentioned auxiliary cruiser Thor, but this raider had returned to Brest. Considering the location of German raiders at this period, it is unlikely that it was a ship of this kind and despite newspaper articles claiming otherwise, was not Admiral Hipper. HMCS Prince David probably sighted the U-boat supply ship Python or a supply ship for disguised raiders.

At the end of August Prince David came upon the 4,000-ton British merchantman St Margaret wallowing towards Trinidad at 5 kn (9.3 km/h; 5.8 mph), with engine trouble. When Prince David closed, the vessel's Master asked for the Canadian's Engineer Officer to come over to have a look, which he did, and reported he did not believe St Margaret could make it. Bermuda was nearest land, 800 miles (1,300 km) west. Expecting that either U-boat or surface raider would sink her, if she did not founder first, Captain Adams decided to intervene, and took the merchantman in tow. St Margaret was brought into Bermuda safely on 3 September.

A hassle whether Prince David deserved a salvage payment over this affair was no short one: it went on almost seven years. In mid-1948, NSHQ collected $14,105 from the owners, of which $3,427.37 was divided up among the ship's company. Due to delay in locating civilian addresses of men who had left the service when the war ended, the last cheque was not sent out until nine years after the event, 11 September 1950. (NSC8852-412/1 Vols. 1&2)

=== The West Coast and Aleutian Campaign ===
1942 movie poster, Commandos Strike at Dawn

After the attack on Pearl Harbor, Prince David was transferred to Canada's West Coast to join her sister ships for a refit and upgrade of weapons. Now based in Esquimalt, they were to take up defensive duties in the Pacific Northeast, off British Columbia. As well as providing protection to shipping in the region, they were to reassure the public by their presence and satisfy American demands for a Canadian naval force in the area.

From 24 to 27 July 1942, Prince David participated in the filming of Commandos Strike at Dawn (some behind-the-scenes footage made during location filming in Canada is included in the CBC Television documentary "Canada's War in Colour").

Mock bombardments of imaginary shore positions were carried out by Prince David in Saanich Inlet, and equally imaginary shore batteries fired back, while movie raiders rowed the ship's boats ashore as hard as they could. A ship-handling problem peculiar to this operation was that in every scene where Prince David was to appear herself, she could present only her starboard side to the camera. It was calculated that cinema-goers would not likely accept the huge sound truck that had been hoisted aboard, and reposed on the weather deck port side, as a regular item in Combined Operations weaponry. The ship's company co-operated heartily, and kept up a high standard of discipline and war-readiness despite the distractions of this fling with film fame, and the glitter of hob-nobbing with the film famous.

After the Japanese occupation of Attu and Kiska in the Aleutian Islands, and fearing their attack posed a serious threat to the Northwest, a strong American naval force was deployed in Alaskan waters. Some estimates had put the Japanese naval strength at four 6-inch cruisers, eight destroyers and as many as eighteen submarines in the Aleutians. Late August 1942, Prince David, Prince Henry, Prince Robert and the corvettes HMCS Dawson and HMCS Vancouver, were ordered to co-operate with American forces being transported to Kodiak. Operating under orders of the United States Navy, and designated as Force "D", they escorted convoys between Kodiak and Dutch Harbor (now Unalaska), Alaska as part of the Aleutian Islands campaign. Prince David and her sister ships made no actual contact with the enemy during their almost 3-month tour of duty in the northern waters. This was not to say, however, that the work was dull or uneventful. Seamen who were used to the open ocean seldom allow themselves to be impressed by anything the weather and navigational difficulties have to offer; but the men of the 'Prince' ships soon realized that whatever the perils of the North Atlantic, nothing compared with the sudden gales, erratic currents and uncharted shoals of the North Pacific. In 1942, the Canadian ships were equipped with only rudimentary radar which made navigation a source of constant danger. Fog gave way to gales which gave way to fog.

HMCS Prince David – Commanding Officers
Name	Date
CDR. W.B. Armit, R.N.C.R.	28 Dec. 1940 to 24 Mar. 1941
CDR. – K.F. Adams, R.C.N.	25 Mar. 1941 to 1 Dec. 1941
CAPT. – V.S. Godfrey, R.C.N.	2 Dec. 1941 to 18 Mar.1942
A/LCDR. – T.D. Kelly, R.C.N.R.	19 Mar. 1942 to 16 Apr.1942
CAPT. – V.S. Godfrey, R.C.N	18 Apr. 1942 to 17 Apr. 1943
CDR. – T.D. Kelly, R.C.N.R.	18 Apr. 1943 to 1 May 1943
CDR. – T.D. Kelly, R.C.N.R.	23 May 1943 to 11 June 1945

529th Canadian L.C.A. Flotilla (Carried in Prince David)
Name	Landing Craft No.
LT. R.G. Buckingham, R.C.N.V.R. Flotilla Officer	L.C.A. 1150
LT. G.E. Allin, R.C.N.V.R.	L.C.A. 1375
LT. J. McBeath, R.C.N.V.R.	L.C.A. 1059
LT. D. Graham, R.C.N.V.R.	L.C.A. 1151
LT. J. Beveridge, R.C.N.V.R.	L.C.A. 1138
L/SMN. Le Vergne, R.C.N.	L.C.A. 1137

Known as the Aleutian "Williwaw", violent winds born in the "storm factory" of the Bering Sea roared down the narrow mountain passes to challenge labouring convoys with little sea room to begin with. Many of the convoy ships, who could not exceed 6 kn (11 km/h; 6.9 mph), battled a 4-knot (7.4 km/h; 4.6 mph) current and, when hit with such a gale, often force 10, frequently had to disperse and find shelter as best they could. The 'Princes' themselves were not known for their manoeuvrability; heavy and blocky, when forced to keep pace with a slow convoy and in order to maintain steerage, the ships often ran with the leeward shaft at twice the speed of the other. Despite these extreme conditions, there were surprisingly few mishaps. On one occasion, while escorting two merchant ships to Dutch Harbor, Prince David encountered a thickening fog. Captain Godfrey deployed a fog buoy as a precaution. SS Elias Howe, one of Prince David's charges, immediately sounded an emergency signal of six blasts on her whistle. Thinking that it was a periscope, she opened fire on the fog buoy streaming from Prince David's stern. After the event Prince David's commanding officer' with commendable objectivity, complimented Elias Howe on her "fine degree of alertness".

It was becoming apparent, by the fall of 1942, that Prince David and her sister ships were not equipped to defend themselves or their charges against well-armed enemy ships that, it was feared, may begin to operate off the West Coast. It was therefore decided to convert Prince David and Prince Henry to landing ships infantry (medium) in preparation for the coming invasion of Europe.

== Landing ship infantry medium (1943–1945) ==
=== Normandy ===
In the spring of 1943, work was under way on the conversion of HMCS Prince David and HMCS Prince Henry to landing ship infantry (medium) LSI (M). They were reconfigured to carry 550 infantrymen transported in six landing craft assault (LCA) and two landing craft mechanised (LCM), and have large sick-bay facilities for the anticipated casualties. Their old 6-inch guns were replaced with two twin 4-inch (102 mm) mountings, two single Bofors 40 mm guns, and ten Oerlikon 20 mm cannons. The rebuilding, which took place at Esquimalt and Vancouver, was completed in December 1943 and shortly after re-commissioning, she left for the United Kingdom via Cristobal and New York, under Captain T.D. Kelly RCNR, (her final commanding officer) who had supervised the fitting-out of both ships.

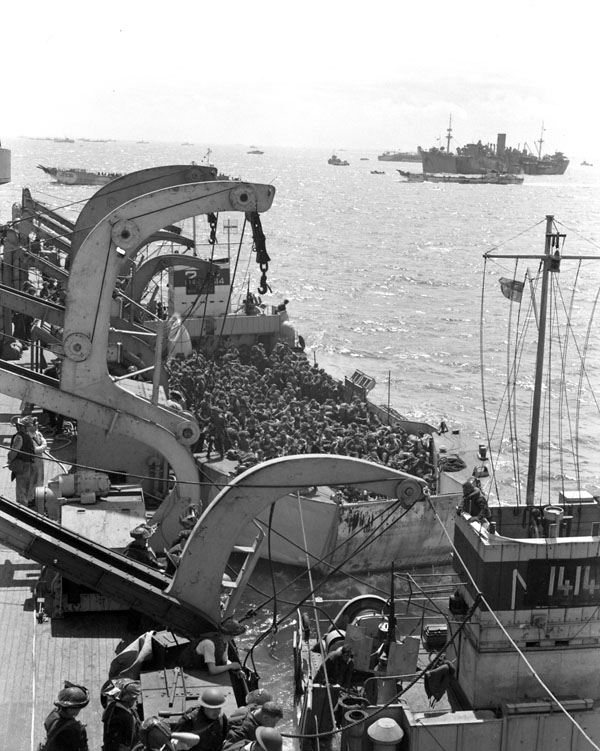
A second section of infantrymen preparing to go ashore from Prince David off Bernières-sur-Mer, France, 6 June 1944.

Upon arrival in the Clyde in February 1944, Prince David was taken to Clydebank for a final fitting out. After completion, Prince David and Prince Henry joined Combined Operations Command at Cowes, Isle of Wright.

At Cowes on 21 April the two Canadian landing ships were joined with their flotillas of assault landing craft. In addition, there arrived within the next few days three Canadian flotillas of the larger infantry landing craft which would make the cross-Channel voyage under their own power. During May, a series of intense, large-scale training exercises took place combining the Canadian craft with many more from the Royal Navy and the United States Navy.

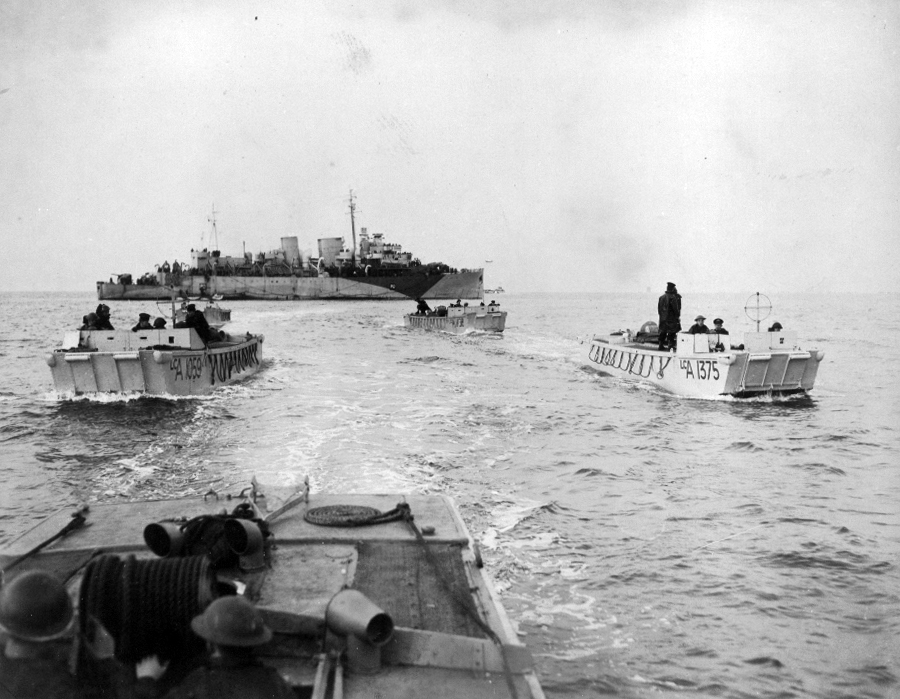
HMCS Prince David, LSI (M) configuration and 4 LCAs

On D-Day, 6 June 1944, Prince David disembarked 418 troops, including elements of Le Régiment de la Chaudière, Royal Marines and a detachment of British pioneers on the Mike and Nan beaches in the Juno sector. First to be lowered were the two Royal Navy craft which she carried in addition to her own. Their mission was to provide supporting small-arms fire and to clear mines and obstacles in advance of the assault craft. The Canadian landing craft then followed to form up with craft from other Canadian Flotillas. H-hour was set for 7.25, and after a delay of twenty minutes for a more favourable tide in the Juno sector, Prince David's landing craft started their hour-long trip to the beaches. Over the course of the day, all but one of her craft had been crippled, sunk or beached high and dry. As the one remaining assault craft made its way back to Prince David, a charging tank carrier forced her over an obstacle, which tore out her bottom and she sank at once. An outbound lighter ferried her crew back to Prince David. With wounded on board and unable to retrieve any of her landing craft, Prince David sailed to Southampton, ending her D-Day involvement. Both ships made four more reinforcement trips to Normandy, one on 18 June and three in July.

=== Mediterranean Theatre ===
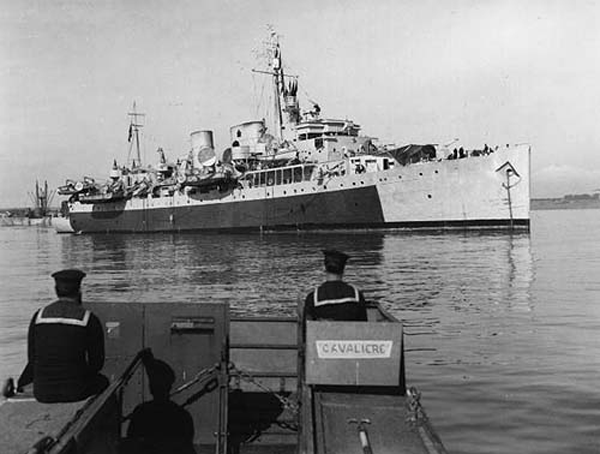
HMCS Prince David LSI (M)

Equipped with new landing craft and in the company of Prince Henry, Prince David, sailed on 24 July for Naples to take part in Operation Dragoon, the invasion of southern France by the US 7th Army and troops from Canada, France and Britain. Acting as command ship for Operation Romeo she carried French commandos of Le 1^{er} Commando Français de l'Afrique du Nord, (English: First French Commando of North Africa) whose task it was to take the gun batteries at Cap Nègre as a prelude to the main action. On 15 August, the French commandos from Prince David were put ashore, some six hours before the main Operation Dragoon landings. The attacking flotilla included HMCS Prince David, HMS Princess Beatrix, HMS Prins Albert and four U.S. motor torpedo boats. After the action and her landing craft had returned with the wounded, Prince David sailed for Corsica. She made two reinforcing trips to the French coast, carrying a total of almost 3,000 troops. HMCS Prince David sailed for the island of Kithera on 14 September with a force of 530 troops of the 9th British Commando to begin the liberation of Greece.

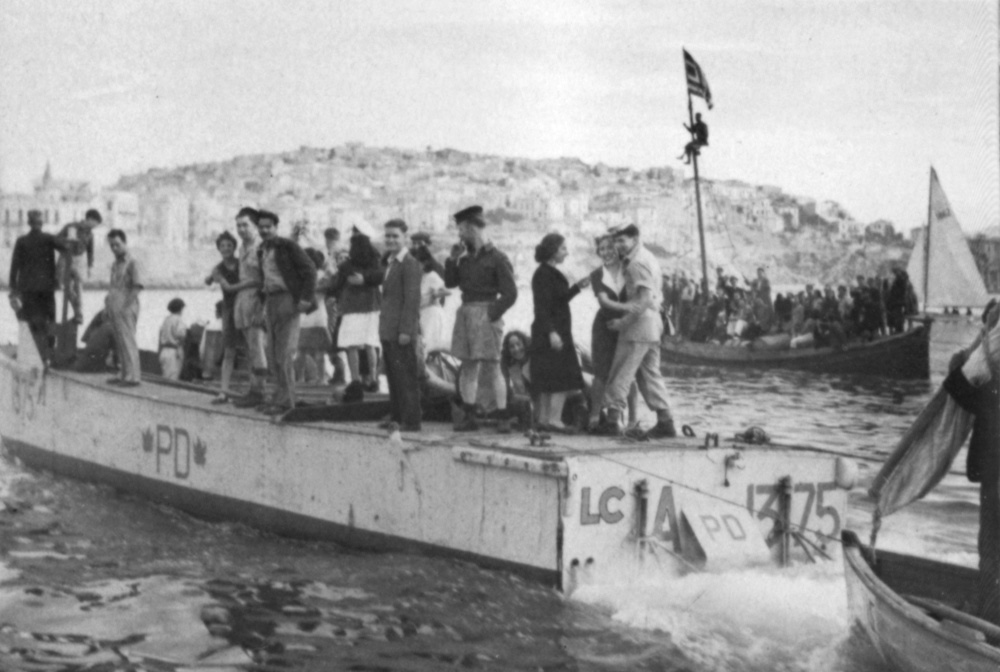
RCN ratings enjoy an enthusiastic welcome during the liberation of Greece.

During the night of 14 September, the troops landed and were greeted not by the enemy, but by crowds of elated Greeks. Prince David loaned the commandos her flotilla of landing craft to facilitate a series of attacks and reoccupation designed to take control of the inner islands of the Aegean.

Prince David set sail on 15 October as part of a large force for the reoccupation and liberation of Greece. On board Prince David was Prime Minister George Papandreou of Greece and his government in exile. As the landing craft entered Piraeus, they were again met with a tumultuous welcome and no sign the enemy. The Germans had left for the north a few days earlier. For the next few weeks Prince David, in company with Prince Henry, ferried both troops and much-needed supplies to a famine-stricken Greece.

With the vacuum created by the hasty retreat of Nazi forces, the returning Greek government in exile clashed with left-wing resistance leaders, who now had military control over much of Greece. Prince David found herself involved in a struggle that would eventually lead to the Greek Civil War. During November and with public order deteriorating in Athens, Prince David was required to help concentrate forces there for a test of strength between the government and the opposition.

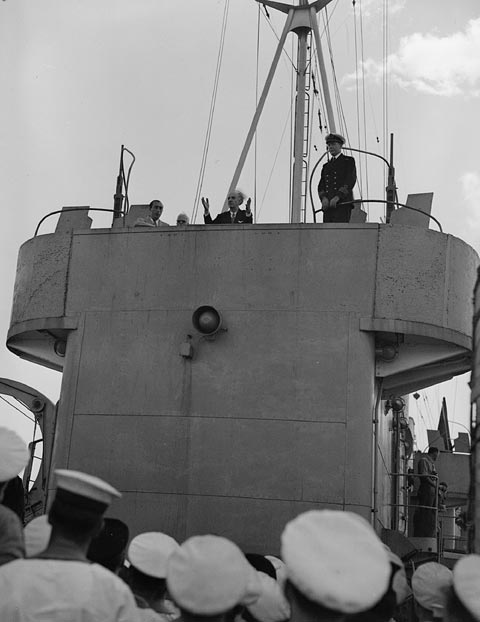
Georgios Papandreou, Prime Minister of Greece, speaking to the Ship's Company of HMCS Prince David

A general strike had sparked an armed clash between police and civilians near the Prime Minister's residence at Piraeus. Prince David's 529th flotilla landed loyal Greek troops at first light on 4 December as rifle and mortar fire could be clearly heard in the city. On 9 December and with Greek hostilities expanded, Prince David sailed again for Piraeus, this time heavily laden with ammunition and a contingent of 311 troops of the British 2nd Parachute Brigade. While steaming through a swept channel, escorted by HMS Beaufort, a Hunt-class destroyer, a mine detonated on Prince David's port side, directly forward of her 4-inch magazine and next to her fuel and fresh water tanks. Prince David limped into Salamis Bay under her own power, albeit slightly down in the bow. After an underwater inspection confirmed that the explosion had opened a 17 by 12 ft (5 by 4 m) hole below the waterline, it was decided that Prince David should withdraw to find repair facilities in quieter waters. She sailed for Ferryville Dry-dock, at Bizerta Tunisia; there she was to remain for the next four weeks while she was fitted with a large patch (which fell off a few days after leaving for Gibraltar ). Late in February 1945, Prince David sailed for Esquimalt to be refitted and transferred to the RN for use in south-east Asia operations. She was transferred to the RN in June but was never taken over. Instead she was paid off, and by January 1946, both Prince David and her sister ship Prince Robert had been towed to and laid up in Lynn Creek, North Vancouver.

From Canada's War at Sea, first published December 1944,

In the reconstruction of ships nothing warrants higher praise than the conversion of HMC Ships Prince Robert, Prince David and Prince Henry to their present status. The conversion of these ships was a unique experience for the Shipbuilders and Technical Officers of the Navy at Headquarters and Esquimult and turned to be the first effort of Canada towards the building of modern anti-aircraft cruisers and well-armed landing ships. These ships are now the most heavily armed of their kind and size in the world and have made a name for themselves on the invasion beaches of Europe. (Leacock & Roberts)

== Post war ==
Charlton Steam Shipping Co. purchased Prince David in September 1946. By February 1947 Prince David was in Britain undergoing conversions to her superstructure for passenger service. Renamed Charlton Monarch, she entered the immigrant trade and ran from Britain to Australia, enjoying the freedom of the sea which she helped to secure. Prince David seemed to be predisposed to striking underwater hazards: in 1932 as CNSS Prince David she spent six months hard aground on the North-East Breaker at Bermuda; in 1941, she was aground again in Bermuda; during her Alaskan tour, she struck an uncharted piling; and in the Mediterranean an exploding mine opened a 17-foot (5 m) hole in her plates. As Charlton Monarch, she once broke down off the coast of Brazil, and on 11 June 1948, SS John Biscoe towed her for twelve hours into Pernambuco. These events, plus the pre-war years of neglect, may have contributed to her early demise. She lasted only 6 years and was broken up at Swansea in 1951.
