= HMCS Prince Robert =

Canadian merchant ship and armed cruiser

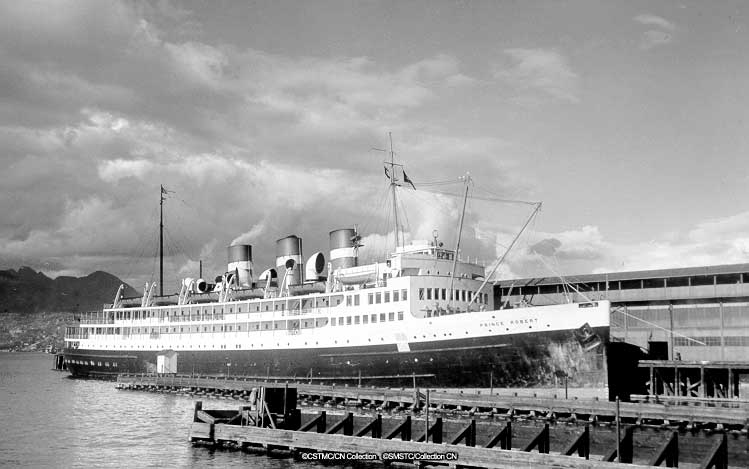

History
- Name: Prince Robert (1930–1939); Charlton Sovereign (1947–1951); Lucania (1951–1962)
- Owner: Canadian National Steamships (1930–1939); Charlton Steam Shipping Company (1947–1951); Fratelli Grimaldi (1951–1962)
- Port of registry: (Canada) Vancouver (1930–1939); (United Kingdom) London (1948–1951); (Italy) Naples (1952–1962)
- Ordered: 1929
- Builder: Cammell Laird, Birkenhead
- Yard number: 966
- Launched: 3 April 1930
- Completed: August 1930
- In service: 1930–1939; 1948–1962
- Out of service: 1962
- Fate: Sold to Royal Canadian Navy (1939–1945); Broken up for scrap 1962

General characteristics as built
- Type: Passenger/cargo ship
- Tonnage: 6,893 GRT; 3,072 NRT
- Length: 385 ft 0 in (117.3 m) oa
- Beam: 57 ft 0 in (17.4 m)
- Draught: 16 ft 6 in (5.0 m)
- Depth: 20 ft 2 in (6.1 m)
- Installed power: 6 × Water-tube, five-drum, super-heated main boilers; 2 × Three-burner Scotch marine boilers for auxiliary power
- Propulsion: 2 × screws; 2 × Parsons reaction three-stage single-reduction geared turbines; 19,300 ihp (14,392 kW)
- Speed: 22.25 knots (41.21 km/h)
- Capacity: 334 first class; 70 third class

HMCS Prince Robert was the first of three refrigerated passenger and cargo ships constructed at Birkenhead for Canadian National for operation along the British Columbia Coast during the 1930s. The ship's arrival during the Great Depression led to the vessel's financial failure and by 1935, the ship was in limited use. With the onset of World War II, the Royal Canadian Navy acquired the vessel for use as an armed merchant cruiser for protection of western coast of Canada. Upon completion, Prince Robert and her sister ships were the most powerful ships operated by the Canadians until the arrival of larger cruisers later in the war. Converted at Esquimalt, British Columbia and commissioned into the Royal Canadian Navy in September 1940, Prince Robert saw its first action along the Mexican coast, capturing the German freighter Weser later that month. Prince Robert then continued patrolling along the Pacific coast of North America, then being sent to Australia to escort troop convoys across the Pacific.

Following the entry of the United States into the war in 1941, Prince Robert took part in the naval operations in Alaska alongside its sister ships Prince Henry and Prince David. As the threat along the Pacific coast of Canada diminished, a new role for Prince Robert and it was converted to an anti-aircraft cruiser in 1943. Prince Robert returned to service later that year and escorted convoys in the Atlantic Ocean and Mediterranean Sea between the United Kingdom and Naples, Italy, defending them against air attack. In 1944, the ship was transferred to the Pacific once again and was at Sydney, Australia when Japan surrendered. Prince Robert was ordered to Hong Kong to repatriate Canadian prisoners of war and to assist in control of the island. The ship returned to Canada on 20 October 1945 and was paid off on 10 December and transferred to War Assets Corporation for disposal.

The ship was sold to private buyers who returned the vessel to the cargo/passenger trade as Charlton Sovereign in 1948. Charlton Sovereign transported displaced persons and refugees from Europe to locations in Central and South America. In 1951, the ship was sold again and renamed Lucania. Lucania was used a passenger ship between Italy and Venezuela until 1962, when the vessel was sold for scrap.

== Design and description ==
Three passenger/cargo ships were ordered by Canadian National from Cammell Laird for construction in the United Kingdom. Designed by A.T. Wall & Co. of Liverpool as luxury liners with the ability to be converted into armed merchant cruisers, Prince Robert was the last of the three, the other two being Prince Henry and Prince David. The ship was 385 feet 0 inches (117.3 m) long overall with a moulded breath of 57 feet 0 inches (17.4 m) and a moulded depth of 20 feet 2 inches (6.1 m). The vessel's draught was 16 feet 6 inches (5.0 m) aft. Prince Robert displaced 5,579 tonnes (5,491 long tons; 6,150 short tons) and had a gross register tonnage (GRT) of 6,893 tons and a net register tonnage (NRT) of 3,072 tons.

Prince Robert was propelled by twin screws driven by two Parsons reaction three-stage single-reduction geared turbines rated at 19,300 indicated horsepower (14,392 kW) at 267 rpm or 14,500 shaft horsepower (10,813 kW). These were powered by six water-tube, five-drum, super-heated main boilers and two three-burner Scotch marine boilers for auxiliary power. The ship achieved 22.25 knots (41.21 km/h) during sea trials and had a range of 6,000 nautical miles (11,112 km) at economical speeds or 3,500 nautical miles (6,482 km) at 20 knots (37 km/h).

The ship had a refrigerated cargo capacity forward and could have accommodation for 334 first class passengers and 70 third class. They could carry 1,500 passengers on day trips. The ship had three decks and an elevator that could move up to two automobiles between them. Prince Robert had an open bridge placed in front of a small, enclosed wheelhouse. The vessel had three funnels and was equipped with six lifeboats per side. Two booms were situated forward over the no. 1 hold. To allow access to jetties of different heights, shell doors were located on each deck.

Problems with the design arose after entering service. Their high sides and lack of maneuverability led to them requiring tugboat assistance when entering smaller harbours. Their speed created a tremendous wash that damaged the sea walls in West Vancouver, British Columbia. This led to Prince Robert and its sister ships having to reduce speed to 10 knots (19 km/h) in Burrard Inlet.

== Service history ==
=== Construction and early civilian service ===
In 1928, the president of Canadian National, Sir Henry Thornton, announced orders for three luxury liners for service on the Pacific coast as part of the effort to re-establish the tri-city route between Vancouver and Victoria, British Columbia and Seattle, Washington and to create a new market for Alaskan cruises. Prince Robert was ordered in 1929 by Canadian National for construction by Cammell Laird at their shipyard in Birkenhead with the yard number 966. The third ship of the class after Prince Henry and Prince David, the ship was launched on 3 April 1930 and named after Robert B. Teakle, a vice-president of Canadian National. Prince Robert was completed in August 1930 and sailed for the British Columbia Coast. However, Prince Robert was forced to return to Birkenhead after the vessel developed engine troubles. The ship did not enter service until May 1931 and began sailing on the tri-city routes. In July 1931, Prince Robert ran aground near Port Townsend, Washington and was withdrawn from service. By 5 September 1931, the tri-city service was ended and Prince Robert spent most of its time laid up in Vancouver.

In 1932 the ship was chartered for extended cruises from Boston, Massachusetts and New York City to destinations such as Bermuda, ports in South America and Hawaii. It was not until 1935 that Prince Robert began seeing more regular service when the ship began to make 11-day cruises to Skagway, Alaska. The 11-day cruises began in Vancouver, stopping in Prince Rupert, British Columbia, Sitka, Ketchikan and Juneau, Alaska, before arriving at Skagway. From November through February each year, Skagway froze over during winter and Prince Robert was laid up for overhaul. The three sister ships were considered economic failures for Canadian National, with their arrival coinciding with the Great Depression. Their failure was one of the contributing factors in the resignation of the president of Canadian National, Sir Henry Thornton. The ships were expensive to operate and did not generate new business. In mid-1939, Prince Robert was chosen to act as a royal yacht during the visit of King George VI and Queen Elizabeth to British Columbia. They embarked aboard Prince Robert at Vancouver and were accompanied by a naval escort to their disembarkation site at Victoria.

=== Conversion ===
History

Canada
- Name: Prince Robert
- Acquired: 1939
- Commissioned: 31 July 1940
- Decommissioned: 10 December 1945
- Identification: Pennant number F56
- Honours and awards: Aleutians 1942, Atlantic 1943-44, English Channel 1944
- Fate: Sold for commercial service 1947

General characteristics
- Displacement: 5,675 long tons (5,766 t)
- Complement: 241
- Sensors & processing systems: ASDIC
- Armament: Armed merchant cruiser; 4 × single BL 6 in (152 mm) Mk VII guns; 2 × 3 in (76 mm) guns; Anti-aircraft cruiser; 5 × twin 4 in (102 mm) HA/LA guns; 8 × 2 pdr pom-poms; 12 × Oerlikon 20 mm cannon

Prior to the outbreak of World War II, the Royal Canadian Navy offered to the British Royal Navy to convert vessels for their own armed merchant cruisers if they were provided with the armaments. The offer was accepted and the Royal Canadian Navy looked around for ships for possible conversion. Though the "Princes" were made available, Prince Robert and its sister ships were initially rejected due to their poor range, limited water supply and low top speed. However, after the outbreak of war, there was a shortage of cruisers and destroyers to deter surface raiders, and the conversion of the three vessels was incorporated in the 1939 Shipbuilding Programme. The British Admiralty advised that only two of the ships be converted. Prince Robert was one of the two initially chosen. Though intended only for chartering by the Royal Canadian Navy, it was later decided to purchase the vessels outright with Prince Robert acquired for $700,000 in November 1939.

The design of the conversion was laid out by the naval architecture firm Lambert, German & Milne of Montreal and work on Prince Robert began on 9 February 1940 at Burrard Dry Dock, Esquimalt, British Columbia with an expected delivery in July. The conversion cost $755,330 and included the trunking of the three funnels into two shorter ones, the installation of four breech-loading 6-inch (152 mm) Mk VII guns, one on each of the two decks forward and aft. The 6-inch guns had once been provided by the Royal Navy and had once been part of the armament of the King Edward VII-class battleships. Two 3-inch (76 mm) guns were fitted on the upper deck amidships along with light anti-aircraft (AA) machine guns. Two depth charge chutes were placed over the stern, though no anti-submarine warfare (ASW) detection equipment was provided. At full load displacement, the draught increased to 21 feet 1 inch (6.4 m). Prince Robert's complement was 241 officers and ratings.

=== Royal Canadian Navy service ===
The threat of German surface raiders along the Pacific Coast forced the Royal Canadian Navy to speed up the conversion. When the conversion was completed, Prince Robert resembled the Hawkins-class cruisers and were the most powerful vessels in the Canadian fleet until the arrival of larger ships later in the war. Prince Robert was commissioned on 31 July 1940 at Vancouver and was ready for sea trials in September. The Royal Canadian Navy had hoped to keep Prince Robert in Canadian waters as protection for west coast Canadian ports. The British Commander-in-Chief of the America and West Indies Station sought to use Prince Robert along the South American coast to disrupt enemy shipping and it was the latter's plan that became Prince Robert's mission. On 11 September, Prince Robert departed Esquimalt for one day of gunnery trials before sailing south to reinforce the Allied blockade of German ships in South American ports.

Prince Robert arrived off Manzanillo, Mexico on 18 September and patrolled the entrance to the harbour. Within the port, the 9,472-ton German merchant vessel SS Weser was known to be getting ready to sail. Weser was carrying supplies for the German auxiliary cruiser Orion and was set to meet up with the raider in the Marshall Islands. On 25 September Weser was spotted departing Manzanillo after dark. The commander of Prince Robert waited until Weser had exited the harbour mouth before placing his ship between Weser and the port, cutting off the German vessel's retreat. Prince Robert followed Weser out to international waters remaining undetected, with the Germans thinking that Prince Robert just another Mexican patrol vessel. Prince Robert moved to seize the German vessel after crossing into international waters, taking the Germans by surprise. The Canadian ship sent a boarding party which was able to prevent the German ship from being scuttled and captured Weser. Prince Robert and Weser then sailed for Esquimalt, where the former German ship was taken into Allied service.

Prince Robert returned to patrolling off the west coast of South and Central America until early February 1941 when the armed merchant cruiser was replaced by a British cruiser. Prince Robert was then redirected to escort Australian troop convoys across the Pacific for the seven months, spending September and October in refit at Esquimalt. In November, Prince Robert escorted the troop transport Awatea that carried C Force to Hong Kong. C Force was the Canadian contingent for the garrison of Hong Kong. Prince Robert transported 109 members of the Royal Rifles of Canada to Hong Kong. Prince Robert and Awatea arrived at Hong Kong on 16 November and disembarked their troops. On 19 November, Prince Robert sailed for Manila, Philippines, arriving two days later to refuel and replenish before sailing again for home. Prince Robert paused at Pearl Harbor, Hawaii before sailing for Esquimalt on 4 December. On 7 December, the United States Army Transport Cynthia Olsen was sunk 150 nautical miles (280 km; 170 mi) south of Prince Robert's location. Prince Robert was ordered to the area to search but found nothing. The armed merchant cruiser arrived at Esquimalt on 10 December. Rumours that Prince Robert had spotted the Japanese fleet that attacked Pearl Harbor on 7 December, were denied and proven to be false.

After returning to Canada, Prince Robert resumed patrols along the coastal shipping lanes as part of Esquimalt Force. This was done to provide a visual presence of the Royal Canadian Navy and to satisfy the American demand for a credible Canadian naval presence. By May 1942 the ship was overhauled at Esquimalt, receiving plastic bridge armour, ASDIC for ASW detection, and 20 mm (0.79 in) cannon for AA protection. In June the Royal Canadian Navy was informed of the upcoming Aleutian Islands Campaign by the United States. Beginning in May, Prince Robert was placed under Royal Navy control as an escort and patrol ship attached to the New Zealand Station. In August, the Americans requested Canadian support and Prince Robert, Prince Henry, Prince David and two Flower-class corvettes, HMCS Vancouver and HMCS Dawson were ordered to join the American fleet at Kodiak, Alaska as "Force D". Force D arrived at Kodiak on 20 August and were placed in Task Force 8. Prince Robert was primarily deployed to escort convoys between Kodiak and Dutch Harbor, each trip taking roughly seven days followed by a four-day maintenance period. The first convoy Prince Robert sailed with nearly led to an incident. On 27 August, the convoy encountered unknown ships crossing their path. They belonged to another convoy, but this information had not been passed to Prince Robert's commander. As tensions mounted after attempts to communicate failed, a US destroyer moved to intercept the ships and ascertain their identity, which resolved the situation. Force D remained in Alaskan waters until 30 October when they departed for Canada, arriving on .

=== As anti-aircraft cruiser ===
As the war progressed, the "Princes"' deficiencies as armed merchant cruisers and the need for newer ship types led to the decision to convert the three ships. Prince Robert was chosen for conversion to an auxiliary AA cruiser for use in air defence for convoys. Prince Robert was taken out of service on 2 January 1943 and converted. The ship's armament was completely changed. The cruiser's main armament consisted of ten quick-firing 4-inch (102 mm) Mk XVI high-angle/low-angle dual-purpose guns in five twin turrets. Furthermore, the ship was given eight 2-pdr (40mm) "pom-poms" in two quadruple mounts and twelve 20 mm Oerlikon cannon. Prince Robert was also given four depth charge throwers. With the conversion, Prince Robert became one of the more powerful AA ships in the war. The ship recommissioned on 7 June 1943 at Vancouver and on 19 June, departed for the River Clyde, via the Panama Canal and Bermuda. While stopped at Bermuda, the vessel's gunnery systems were modified.

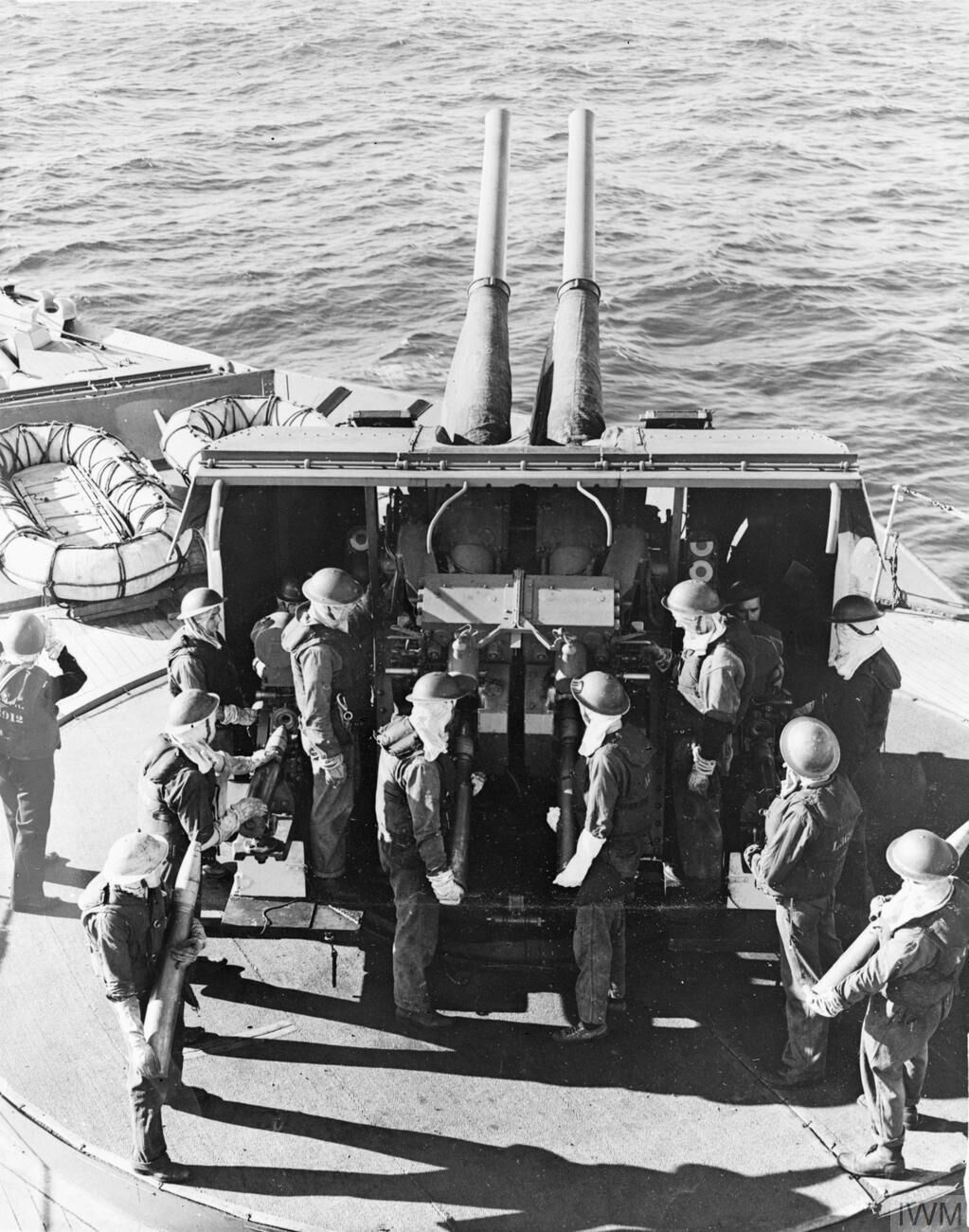
An AA gun crew aboard Prince Robert in March 1944

Shore parties from HMCS Prince Robert disarm Japanese military personnel in Hong Kong, August 1945

On 20 October, Prince Robert was ready for active service, and the following day sailed to join the Mediterranean Fleet to be used as an AA escort for convoys operating between the United Kingdom and Sierra Leone and convoys in the Mediterranean Sea. On 21 November, Prince Robert joined the escort of the joint convoy SL 139/MKS 30. The convoy had previously survived a concerted U-boat assault and the day Prince Robert joined the escort screen, the convoy came under air attack. The Luftwaffe had sent 25 Heinkel He 177 bombers to attack the convoy with glide bombs. During the air assault, one merchant ship was sunk and another damaged. Two German aircraft were shot down. While supporting convoys travelling to Naples, Italy, the ship was tied into the local AA defence of the harbours it was docked in by telephone. In January 1944, Prince Robert was reassigned to Plymouth Command but remained as AA support for convoys travelling to the Mediterranean. After escorting 17 convoys, Prince Robert was withdrawn from European waters in September as the German air threat diminished and transferred once again to the Pacific. Prince Robert departed Plymouth in September, sailing to Esquimalt for another overhaul.

Prince Robert recommissioned at Vancouver on 4 June 1945 and sailed for Sydney, Australia on 4 July via San Francisco. At San Francisco, the AA armament was altered, with four twin Oerlikon mounts replaced with four twin 40 mm (1.57 in) Bofors gun mounts. In early August, Prince Robert joined the British Pacific Fleet. On 15 August, Japan surrendered and Prince Robert was part of Task Group 111.2 sent to secure Hong Kong from Japanese control. Upon arrival on 31 August, Prince Robert sent landing parties to secure the dock area, railyard and train station. Prince Robert's commander represented Canada at the formal surrender of Hong Kong to Allied forces on 16 September. Prince Robert's landing parties were replaced by Marine detachments from the battleship HMS Anson. Canadian prisoners of war from the units Prince Robert had ferried over to Hong Kong in 1941 were brought aboard the ship to be transported back to Canada. Prince Robert detached from the British Pacific Fleet and sailed for Esquimalt via Subic Bay and Manila. Prince Robert arrived at Esquimalt on 20 October and was paid off on 10 December 1945. The ship was transferred to the War Assets Corporation for disposal in January 1946 and laid up in Bedwell Bay, at the northern end of Burrard Inlet.

=== Commercial service and fate ===
War Assets sold Prince Robert to the Charlton Steam Shipping Company in 1947. The ship was reconverted to a passenger/cargo ship at Antwerp and renamed Charlton Sovereign. The conversion allowed them to carry 750 passengers in eight-berth cabins and 20 to 40-person dormitories. The ship was registered in London and re-entered service in 1948. In May 1948, Charlton Sovereign was chartered for use by the International Refugee Organization to transport displaced persons and refugees from Europe. In August, the ship sailed from Bremerhaven to Sydney, Australia, stopping for a month at Gibraltar to undergo engine repairs. The voyage took 86 days. Charlton Sovereign then made a voyage from Bremerhaven to Rio de Janeiro, Brazil, developing engine problems again. Upon return to Europe, the ship underwent two-month refit on the River Tyne. After returning to service, the vessel made trips from Naples, Italy to Rio de Janeiro, Naples to Halifax and Naples to Central America. The ship then sailed pilgrimage routes.

In 1951, the ship was acquired by Fratelli Grimaldi, renamed Lucania and registered in Naples. Intended for the emigrant trade, in 1953, the ship underwent significant reconstruction, being lengthened to 399 feet 11 inches (121.9 m) overall and the gross register tonnage decreasing to 6,723 tons. The bow was lengthened and the funnels replaced and moved. Lucania could accommodate 90 first-class passengers, 90 intermediate and 560 tourist passengers. Sailing between Italy and Venezuela, Lucania remained in service until 1962. On 15 March 1962, Lucania was sold for scrap to G. Riccardi and broken up at Vado Ligure, near Livorno, Italy.

== Notable passengers ==
The Czech-born artists Dusan and Voitre Marek travelled to Sydney from Germany as post-war immigrants to Australia, arriving in August 1948. They both created paintings in surrealist style along the way, some of which are now held by the Art Gallery of South Australia in Adelaide.

== Sources ==
- Boutiller, James A., ed. (1982). RCN in Retrospect, 1910–1968. Vancouver: University of British Columbia Press. ISBN 0-7748-0196-4.
- Chesneau, Roger, ed. (1980). Conway's All the World's Fighting Ships 1922–1946. Greenwich, UK: Conway Maritime Press. ISBN 0-85177-146-7.
- Douglas, W.A.B.; Sarty, Roger & Whitby, Michael (2002). No Higher Purpose: The Official Operational History of the Royal Canadian Navy in the Second World War, 1939–1943 Volume II, Part I. St. Catharines, Ontario: Vanwell Publishing. ISBN 1-55125-061-6.
- Douglas, W.A.B.; Sarty, Roger & Whitby, Michael (2007). A Blue Water Navy: The Official Operational History of the Royal Canadian Navy in the Second World War, 1943–1945 Volume II, Part II. St. Catharines, Ontario: Vanwell Publishing. ISBN 978-1-55125-069-4.
- Greenway, Ambrose (2011). Cargo Liners: An Illustrated History. Barnsley, UK: Seaforth Publishing. ISBN 978-1-84832-129-8.
- Hacking, Norman (1995). Prince Ships of Northern B.C.: Ships of the Grand Trunk Pacific and Canadian National Railways. Surrey, British Columbia: Heritage House Publishing. ISBN 1-895811-28-7.
- Macpherson, Ken & Barrie, Ron (2002). The Ships of Canada's Naval Forces 1910–2002 (Third ed.). St. Catharines, Ontario: Vanwell Publishing. ISBN 1-55125-072-1.
- Milner, Marc (17 April 2010). "The Three Princes: Navy, Part 38". Legion Magazine.
- "Prince Robert (1156906)". Miramar Ship Index.
- Schull, Joseph (1961). The Far Distant Ships: An Official Account of Canadian Naval Operations in the Second World War. Ottawa: Queen's Printer. OCLC 19974782.
