= Hai Ou =

Hai Ou may refer to:

- HMS Sansovino (F162)
- Dvora class fast patrol boat
