= Operation Romeo =

French World War II commando operation

Coordinates: 43°9′18″N 6°26′25″E

- Part of Operation Dragoon in the Western Front of World War II
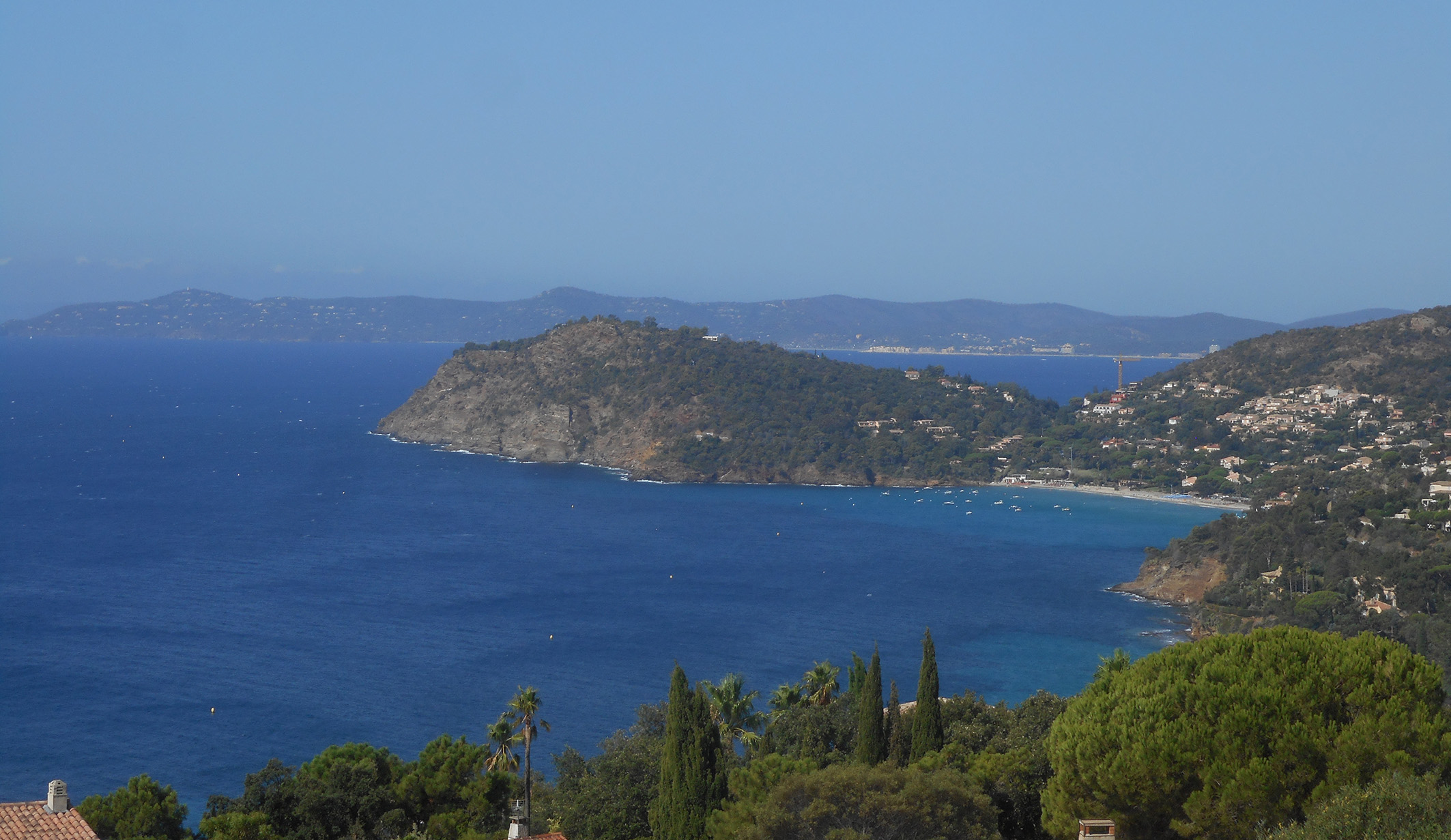
- View of Cap Nègre from le Rayol-Canadel
Date	15 August 1944
Location	Cap Nègre, Côte d'Azur, France
Result	French victory

Belligerents
France	Germany

Commanders and leaders
Georges-Régis Bouvet	(Nazi Germany) Unknown

Strength
800	>1,000

Casualties and losses
11 killed 50 wounded	300 dead 700 captured Unknown wounded Several artillery pieces captured or destroyed

Operation Romeo was a French World War II commando operation to disable German artillery atop the cliffs of Cap Nègre. The operation happened the evening before Operation Dragoon, the main invasion of Southern France. The force consisted of 800 French commandos of the 1er Commando Français de l'Afrique du Nord (First French Commando of North Africa), commanded by Lieutenant Colonel Georges-Régis Bouvet. The attacking flotilla included the command ship HMCS Prince David, HMCS Prince Henry, HMS Princess Beatrix, HMS Prins Albert and four U.S. Motor Torpedo Boats.

At 0130 15 August, 95 commandos in landing craft from Prince David beached first, while the remainder of the force waited offshore. The commandos had to climb a 350 feet (107 m) tall cliff to reach their objective. Half an hour later, they sent word back that the enemy gun positions had been silenced. The main body of Romeo then came onto the beach. About 800 commandos moved quickly and were soon established across the main road between Toulon and the Riviera. 300 German soldiers were killed and 700 taken prisoner. The French commandos suffered 11 men killed and 50 wounded. The force held its position until relieved by VI Corps from the east on August 15, 1944.
