= F56 =

F56 may refer to:

- F56 (classification), a disability sport classification for disability athletics for people who compete in field events from a seated position
- Farman F.56, a French pusher biplane reconnaissance aircraft
- HMS Argonaut (F56), a Leander-class frigate that served with the Royal Navy from 1967 to 1993
- HMS Transylvania (F56), a British Anchor Line passenger liner later converted into an armed merchant cruiser, pennant F56 during World War II
- HMCS Prince Robert (F56), a Canadian passenger and cargo ship, served as an armed merchant cruiser and later anti-aircraft cruiser in World War II
- Wright GR-1820-F-56 Cyclone, an aircraft engine
- The third generation of the 3-door BMW MINI Hatch, codenamed F56
