= HMCS Prince Henry =

Armed merchant cruiser ship in World War II

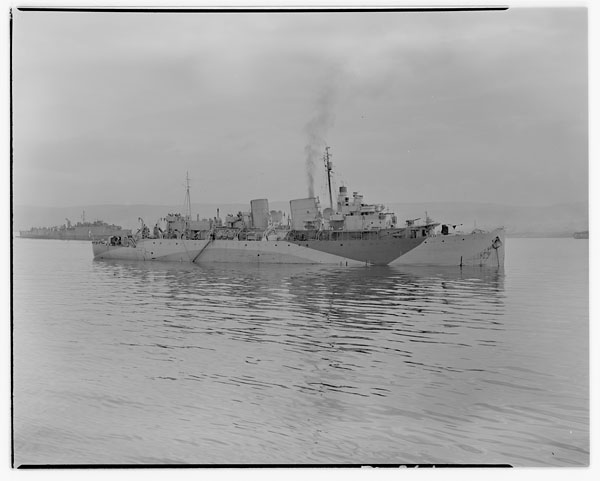
- HMCS Prince Henry as a landing ship infantry at Greenock in May 1944

History
- Name: Prince Henry
- Owner: Canadian National Steamship Company (1930–1938); Clarke Steamship Company (1938–1939)
- Operator: Canadian National Steamship Company (1930–1937); Clarke Steamship Company (1937–1939)
- Port of registry: (Canada) Vancouver (1930–1937); (Canada) Montreal (1937–1939)
- Builder: Cammell Laird, Birkenhead
- Yard number: 964
- Launched: 17 January 1930
- Completed: May 1930
- In service: 1930
- Out of service: 1939
- Renamed: North Star 1937
- Fate: Acquired by Royal Canadian Navy 1939

General characteristics as built
- Type: Ocean liner
- Tonnage: 6,893 GRT
- Length: 366 ft 4 in (111.7 m) pp
- Beam: 57 ft 1 in (17.4 m)
- Installed power: 6 Yarrow boilers; 16,500 shp (12,304 kW)
- Propulsion: 2 Parsons single reduction geared steam turbines; 2 shafts
- Speed: 20.5 knots (38.0 km/h)
- Capacity: 334 first class; 70 deck

HMCS Prince Henry was an armed merchant cruiser and a landing ship infantry during World War II for the Royal Canadian Navy. The ship began service as the ocean liner SS Prince Henry for the Canadian National Steamship Company servicing ports along the Canadian British Columbia Coast and cities in the United States Northwest. However, lack of commercial opportunity and the arrival of the Great Depression forced the vessel's owners to send Prince Henry to ply the passenger trade along the North American eastern seaboard. In 1937, the vessel was chartered by Clarke Steamship Company and renamed SS North Star for service in the Caribbean Sea and the Gulf of St. Lawrence. The Clarke Steamship Company purchased the vessel outright in 1938. In 1939, with the outbreak of World War II, North Star was one of the vessels acquired by the Royal Canadian Navy for naval service, which returned the ship to its original name.

Converted to an armed merchant cruiser, Prince Henry was ordered to patrol along the west coast of South America to intercept German merchant vessels trying to break the British blockade and return to Germany. Prince Henry took part in the apprehension of two German merchant vessels. The armed merchant cruiser escorted convoys in the US Aleutians campaign before returning to Canada to undergo conversion to a landing ship infantry. Following the conversion, Prince Henry was sent to the United Kingdom to take part in the invasion of Normandy. Prince Henry landed troops on Juno Beach on D-day and then spent the next two months supporting the beachhead. The vessel was then sent to the Mediterranean Sea in preparation for Operation Dragoon, the invasion of Southern France. Prince Henry was flagship of one of the advance forces clearing coastal islands prior to the main invasion. Prince Henry continued service in the Mediterranean, landing Allied troops at Piraeus in the liberation of Greece from the Axis powers. Following this service, Prince Henry returned to the United Kingdom where the ship was paid off by the Royal Canadian Navy and loaned to the Royal Navy.

Taken into British service as Prince Henry, the vessel served as an accommodation ship and headquarters ship at Wilhelmshaven, Plymouth and Falmouth. Following the end of the war, the ship was acquired outright by the Ministry of War Transport, renamed Empire Parkeston and used as a troopship to shuttle military personnel between Harwich and the Hook of Holland. In 1956, Empire Parkeston was one of the troopships used to land invasion forces at Port Said in the Suez Crisis. The vessel was taken out of service in 1961 and sold to be broken up for scrap at La Spezia, Italy in 1962.

== Description ==
As built, Prince Henry was considered a small ocean liner. The ship was 366 feet 4 inches (111.7 m) long between perpendiculars with a beam of 57 feet 1 inch (17.4 m). The vessel had a gross register tonnage (GRT) of 6,893 tons. Prince Henry had a small forecastle and cruiser stern as built and three funnels situated on an extra deck combined with a vertical stem.

The ship was powered by six Yarrow watertube boilers feeding two Parsons single reduction geared steam turbines, driving two shafts. The engines were rated at 19,000 shaft horsepower (14,168 kW) during sea trials, giving the ship a maximum speed of 23 knots (42.6 km/h). However, in service the vessel operated at 16,500 shp (12,304 kW) with maximum speed of 21.5 knots (39.8 km/h). (Note: The speed of the ship varies between the sources. Milner and Macpherson & Barrie give the speed of the ship as 22 knots (40.7 km/h) while the Miramar Ship Index gives the speed of the vessel as 22.5 knots (41.7 km/h).) Prince Henry could carry 1,470 long tons (1,490 t) of fuel oil.

Prince Henry had a capacity of 334 first class passengers and 70 deck passengers. The ship could also accommodate several cars. After being acquired by the Clarke Steamship Company, the vessel was refitted to carry 335 cruise passengers.

=== Conversion to warship ===
In 1939 Prince Henry was converted first to an armed merchant cruiser, then in 1943, to a landing ship infantry. The ship's displacement as a warship was 5,736 long tons (5,828 t) and had a draught of 21 feet 0 inches (6.4 m). The ship was armed with four single breech-loading 6-inch (152 mm) Mk VII guns of antiquated design for engaging surface targets were mounted along the centreline, two forward and two aft. The guns had a maximum angle of 20° and could not be used against aircraft. (Note: Mark VII = Mark 7. Britain used Roman numerals to denote Marks (models) of ordnance until after World War II.) The guns were 45 years old and had no fire-control system. For anti-aircraft warfare, the ship was fitted with two single 3-inch (76 mm) 20 cwt guns. (Note: "Cwt" is the abbreviation for hundredweight, 20 cwt referring to the weight of the gun.) Depth charge chutes and machine guns rounded out the offensive weaponry of the ship. Additionally, more bulkheads were added and a new naval bridge was installed. The two forward funnels were raked together into one. The upper decks were removed and replaced by a light cruiser superstructure. Furthermore, the remaining decks were strengthened to support the guns. However, the large internal spaces that remained, such as the spacious engine rooms, cargo spaces and remaining accommodation areas made Prince Henry vulnerable to a torpedo attack. After the conversion, Prince Henry was of similar strength to the destroyers in service with the Royal Canadian Navy, but with greater range. As a warship, the vessel's complement was 31 officers and 386 enlisted.

== Construction and career ==
Prince Henry was one of three small ocean liners ordered by Canadian National Railway (CNR) for passenger service along the West Coast of Canada, travelling between Vancouver, Victoria and Seattle, along with Prince Robert and Prince David. Constructed at Birkenhead by Cammell Laird with the yard number 964, Prince Henry was the second ship of the class be built. The ship was launched on 17 January 1930 and completed in May. All three ships in the class were named for current executives of the company, Prince Henry taking its name from Sir Henry Thornton, the then-president of CNR.

The Prince ships were high-sided and less maneuverable than preceding classes in CNR service. The vessels were expensive to operate and their arrival created no new business opportunities for the company beyond providing an alternative to Canadian Pacific's coastal operations. Their large size required tugboat support in Victoria Harbour for berthing and un-berthing and the wash created by them while travelling at speed did damage to the sea walls of West Vancouver, requiring them to travel at a maximum of 10 knots (19 km/h; 12 mph) while in the Burrard Inlet.

In 1931, following the grounding of Prince Robert, Prince Henry and Prince David were sent to the Atlantic Coast to operate as cruise liners. The failure of the class along the Pacific coast caused the president of Canadian National, Sir Henry Thornton, to be ousted and the Conservative government's angry attention to CN's business. Prince Henry began performing Atlantic cruises in 1932, making 24 round trips between Boston, Havana and other Caribbean ports by the end of the year. Prince Henry performed another five Caribbean cruises and one charter cruise from the Atlantic, through the Panama Canal to Skagway, British Columbia before returning to Halifax via Honolulu. On 13 March 1934, Prince Henry ran aground at St. George's, Bermuda.

In 1937, Prince Henry was chartered by the Clarke Steamship Company of Quebec to operate in the St. Lawrence River and Gulf of St. Lawrence during the summer months and in winter months, travel between Miami, Port-au-Prince, Kingston and Havana. The following year, the Clarke Steamship Company purchased the ship and renamed her North Star.

=== War service ===
History

Canada
- Name: Prince Henry
- Acquired: 1939
- Commissioned: 4 December 1940
- Decommissioned: 15 April 1945
- Honours and awards: Aleutians, 1942; Normandy, 1944; South France, 1944; Aegean, 1944
- Fate: Transferred to UK 1945

History
- Name: Prince Henry
- Operator: General Steam Navigation Company
- Port of registry: (United Kingdom) London
- Acquired: 1945
- In service: 1945
- Out of service: 1961
- Renamed: Empire Parkeston 1946
- Fate: Broken up at La Spezia, Italy 1962

General characteristics
- Displacement: 5,736 long tons (5,828 t)
- Capacity: Landing ship infantry; 550 troops
- Complement: 417
- Sensors & processing systems: Asdic
- Armament: Armed merchant cruiser; 4 × single 6 in (152 mm) Mk VII guns; 2 × single 3 in (76 mm) 20 cwt guns; Landing ship infantry; 2 × twin 4 in (102 mm) Mk XVI HA/LA guns; 2 × single 40 mm Bofors guns; 10 × single 20 mm Oerlikon cannon

After the declaration of war Canada, the British Admiralty was informed by the Canadian Naval Service that the three Prince ships were available for naval use. In September 1939, as part of the initial Canadian wartime naval programme, the three Prince ships were selected for conversion into armed merchant cruisers. Lambert, German and Milne of Montreal were chosen to design their conversions. The three Prince-class ships were seen as the replacement on the West Coast for the River-class destroyers that had departed for Atlantic Canada in 1939. Acquisition of the vessels was seen as more cost-effective and the Royal Canadian Navy paid $800,000 for North Star, which returned to its original name, Prince Henry in Canadian service. Prince Henry's conversion was performed by Canadian Vickers.

Prince Henry underwent conversion to an armed merchant cruiser at Montreal. Upon completion of her refit at Halifax in January 1941, the ship travelled to Bermuda for work ups. On 21 February, Prince Henry sailed on her first operational cruise. Based out of Jamaica, she transited the Panama Canal to rendezvous with the cruiser HMS Diomede on 1 March.

Assigned to operate with Diomede off the coast of South America, Prince Henry sailed into the port of Callao, Peru on 24 March 1941 to refuel. Also in port were four German merchant vessels, Hermonthis, Muenchen, Leipzig and Montserrate. After refueling, Prince Henry left the port on 25 March and awaited the German merchant ships outside of Peruvian waters. Two of the German vessels left Callao on 1 April and the armed merchant cruiser moved to intercept. At 0630, Prince Henry spotted the first merchant vessel and placed a warning shot across the German ship's bow at 0700. At 0701, smoke was spotted coming from the superstructure and by 0705, the ship was covered in it. At 0715, the crew of Muenschen abandoned ship, to be picked up by RFA Bishopdale.

With the fire aboard Muenschen too far advanced, Prince Henry departed the scene to find the other German merchant. At 1225, Prince Henry spotted Hermonthis, on fire, sinking and abandoned. Prince Henry ordered the German sailors back to their ship, an order which most obeyed, and sent a boarding party to Hermonthis. The ship's sinking was halted, however the fire was out of control and the ship was listing 15°. Prince Henry came alongside the ship in an attempt to put the fire out, however the attempt was unsuccessful. It was then decided to sink the burning merchant, and Prince Henry fired 35 rounds of its 6-inch (152 mm) guns into the hull of Hermonthis. The German merchant vessel sank on 2 April.

Prince Henry began searching for Muenschen and her crew. On 3 April, the armed merchant cruiser returned to the German ship's last known position at 0800, however Muenschen was not found. Prince Henry began a search and encountered the Peruvian cruiser BAP Almirante Grau around 1145. The Peruvian cruiser informed Prince Henry that she had sunk Muenschen by gunfire two hours earlier. Prince Henry began looking for the crew of Muenschen, however three hours later, Prince Henry was ordered away from the area on a new patrol. The crew and their lifeboats were later intercepted by Bishopdale, however the ship was unable to capture them, being an unarmed tanker and the Germans made it safely ashore at Casma, Peru, where they were arrested.

Following the sinking of the two German ships, Prince Henry continued patrolling for three more weeks and then returned to Esquimalt, British Columbia to resupply and offload prisoners. Prince Henry resumed patrolling the Pacific until September, when Prince Henry was sent to St. John's, Newfoundland to become a depot ship for the Newfoundland Escort Force. In January 1942, Prince Henry resumed patrolling, this time in the West Indies. There, the ship was assigned to Caribbean Sea Frontier under United States Navy Rear Admiral John H. Hoover. On 22 February, the ship attempted to stabilise the torpedoed SS Lihue. A boarding party was put aboard the ship, but the merchant vessel's crew, who had been recovered, refused to return to the ship. The following day, Prince Henry departed to return to its patrol, having turned over the salvage of Lihue to USS Partridge. Lihue later sank, with the salvage crew escaping the ship aboard Prince Henry's whaler. On 3 April Prince Henry recovered 44 survivors from SS Delvalle which had been torpedoed. The ship departed the West Indies on 20 April and arrived at Esquimalt on 7 May and served with the local escort force there until March 1943, with the exception of a period spent on assignment with the United States Navy during the Aleutians campaign. During this period, Prince Henry was fitted with plastic bridge armour and early asdic.

After the Japanese invaded islands in the Territory of Alaska threatening northwestern North America, the US assembled a force to retake the islands. All three Prince ships were assigned to the Aleutians campaign, along with the corvettes HMCS Dawson and HMCS Vancouver. The Canadian ships sailed on 20 August 1942 from Esquimalt, bound for Kodiak. Once there, they were tasked with escort duties, protecting supply convoys travelling between Kodiak, Dutch Harbor and locations between. The Canadian ships were placed under US command and spent two uneventful months traversing Alaskan waters.

=== As landing ship ===
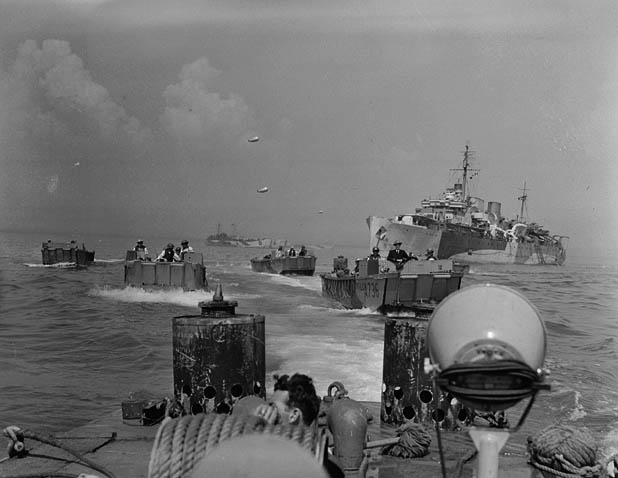
Assault landing craft leaving HMCS Prince Henry during a training exercise in May 1944

Beginning on 6 March 1943, Prince Henry underwent conversion to a medium landing ship infantry at Burrard Dry Dock in East Vancouver (her sister ship Prince David also underwent conversion). Prince Henry carried eight landing craft assault, each 20 long tons (20 t), four to each side of the ship. They were deployed using quadrantal davits located on the upper deck. The 6-inch guns were removed and replaced by a two twin 4-inch (102 mm) Mk XVI HA/LA mounts, two single 40 mm Bofors and ten 20 mm Oerlikon mounts. The accommodation area was reconfigured in order to accommodate a large sick bay and a large command section was fitted. The accommodation area was able to hold 550 troops after bunks were fitted. Following the conversion, the complement of the ship was increased to 31 officers and 322 enlisted, including the landing craft crews. The ship re-commissioned on 6 January 1944. Prince Henry sailed for the UK, stopping at Bermuda to pick up 250 British schoolchildren who had been evacuated during the Blitz. Upon arrival and disembarking the children, the vessel sailed to Clydebank to undergo final fitting of radar, communications equipment and Oerlikons at the John Brown & Company shipyard.

After completing the final fittings, Prince Henry sailed for Cowes in April 1944. At Cowes, Prince Henry embarked the 528th Flotilla of landing craft. April and May were used for training with the invasion fleet. On 2 June, Prince Henry loaded assault forces. The units assigned to Prince Henry during the invasion were 147 of the Canadian Scottish and 128 support troops, forming the reserve for the 7th Canadian Infantry Brigade of the 3rd Canadian Division. Aside from landing troops, Prince Henry also acted as senior officer's ship of Force J1, composed of 22 merchant vessels heading for Juno Beach. Force J was tasked with landing troops on sectors "Mike" and "Nan" on Juno Beach. Prince Henry's troops were to land on "Mike Red", 1 mile (2 km) east of Courselles. At 2140 on 5 June, Prince Henry sailed for Normandy, following the destroyer HMCS Algonquin into the swept channel 7 towards the beaches.

After reaching a position 7 miles (11 km) offshore, Force J turned parallel to the coast, with 300 yards (270 m) between ships and prepared for the assault. Prince Henry began lowering the assault craft at 0545 on 6 June and by 0827 the Canadian Scottish were landing on the beaches. LCA 856 hit a beach obstacle and LCA 1021 collided with a tank landing craft, but both made it to shore and landed their troops. By 1230, all of the landing craft, save the duty boat, were loaded back aboard Prince Henry. The duty boat was hit by mortar fire and required some repairs, but quickly returned to duty. Prince Henry embarked 57 wounded, along with survivors from ships that had sunk during the assault and sailed back to Cowes in a nine-ship convoy at night.

Prince Henry embarked landing craft and American troops for Utah Beach during the reinforcement phase of the assault. Following that delivery, Prince Henry joined Prince David for ten days at anchor. The ship made one more voyage to Normandy, this time starting from Portland in June, then three more voyages in July before departing for a boiler cleaning at Southampton. Between them, Prince Henry and Prince David transported 5,566 troops to Normandy. In 2023, Prince Henry was awarded the campaign honour "Normandy, 1944", in addition to honours that had been awarded decades earlier.

Prince Henry departed Southampton for Gibraltar on 24 July and then travelled on to Naples, Italy. There, the ship joined the forces gathering for the invasion of southern France named Operation Dragoon. Prince Henry arrived at Naples on 31 July and was designated the headquarters ship for the force subdivision "Sitka Unit B" on 6 August. "Sitka Unit B" was composed of Prince Henry and four US destroyer troop transports, escorted by four motor torpedo boats. The ship would be the flagship of US Rear Admiral T. E. Chandler, who commanded one of the main force divisions. In addition to the headquarters staff, Prince Henry embarked 279 members of the First Special Service Force.

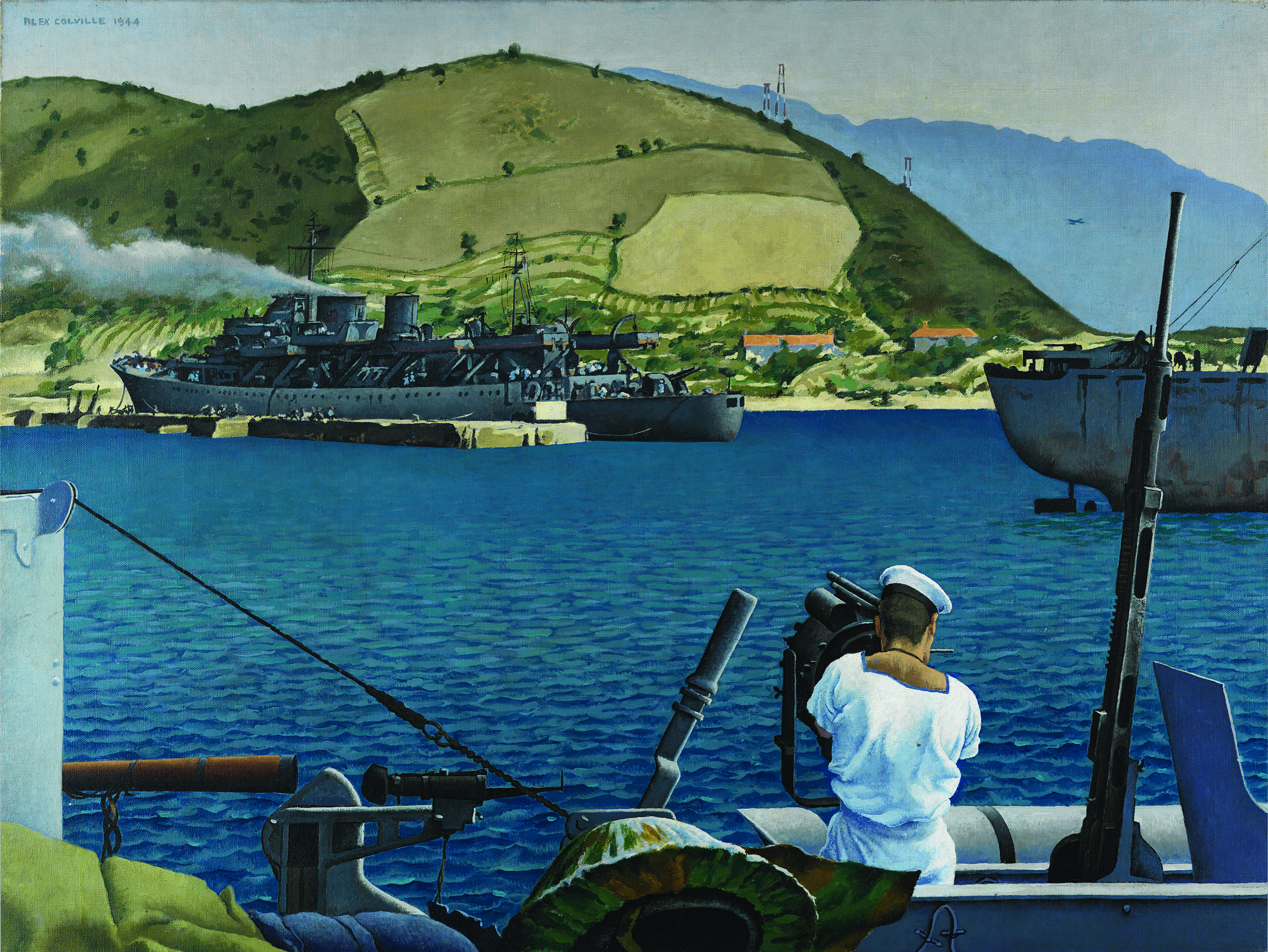
His Majesty's Canadian Ship Prince Henry in Corsica by Alex Colville, 1944

After departing Naples, the force stopped at Corsica for one day. On 14 August "Sitka Unit B" departed for the coastal islands of Port-Cros and Île du Levant, which were located 22 miles (35 km) east of Toulon. There, "Sitka Unit B" was tasked with eliminating coastal defences on the islands such as shore batteries ahead of the main landings. The force arrived off the islands at 2300 on 14 August. The troops landed successfully the next morning, but soon encountered stiff resistance. Prince Henry's landing craft spend the day shuttling casualties and prisoners of war to the waiting ships offshore. By 1500, the landing craft had returned to Prince Henry and been lifted aboard. Following the main invasion of southern France, Prince Henry travelled between Corsica and the landing zone twice before returning to Italy.

Prince Henry spent September ferrying troops and landing craft from Messina to ports further north along the Adriatic coast in preparation for possible landings in Yugoslavia and Greece. A force was assembled at Taranto in October, where Prince Henry was one of seven landing ships involved. On 15 October, the force sailed. Prince Henry arrived at Piraeus on 17 October and landed her troops. In the following weeks, the ship ferried men and supplies between Taranto and Athens. After the Germans retreated from northern Greece, Prince Henry took part in the relief mission to Salonika. On 23 December, the ship was ordered to Preveza to take over duties of Senior Naval Officer and to evacuate as many people as possible during the Greek Civil War. Prince Henry arrived on 24 October carrying Prince David's flotilla of landing craft along with its own. From 24 to 29 December, Prince Henry evacuated 4,400 people. On 31 December, Prince Henry returned to Taranto.

=== British service ===
Prince Henry remained in the Mediterranean Sea until March, when she sailed for Gibraltar. On 18 November 1944, the British Admiralty sent a request to the Royal Canadian Navy asking for two ships for loan for use in Southeast Asian operations if the Canadians could not man them. The Royal Canadian Navy offered Prince Henry and Prince David. After arriving at Gibraltar, Prince Henry joined a convoy returning to the United Kingdom and arrived at London on 15 April where she was paid off by the Royal Canadian Navy, which declared that they could not man the ship.

The British assumed control of the ship on loan and recommissioned the vessel HMS Prince Henry. The ship sailed for Wilhelmshaven for use as an accommodation and headquarters ship in late 1945 and at Portsmouth and later Falmouth. In 1946, the vessel was purchased by the UK Ministry of War Transport for $500,000 and renamed Empire Parkeston. The ministry placed the ship under the management of the General Steam Navigation Company and used her as a troopship operating between Harwich and the Hook of Holland. In 1956, Empire Parkeston was requisitioned for use by the Royal Navy and used as a landing ship during the landings at Port Said during the Suez Crisis. Empire Parkeston was the first naval ship to land elements of 16 Parachute Brigade on 5 November. Following the Suez Crisis, Empire Parkeston returned to service on the Harwich-Holland run, but was withdrawn in September 1961 after troop movements began to be made exclusively by air. The ship was sold to Lotti and broken up at La Spezia, Italy in 1962.

== Sources ==
- Boutiller, James A., ed. (1982). RCN in Retrospect, 1910–1968. Vancouver: University of British Columbia Press. ISBN 0-7748-0196-4.
- Chesneau, Roger, ed. (1980). Conway's All the World's Fighting Ships 1922–1946. Greenwich, UK: Conway Maritime Press. ISBN 0-85177-146-7.
- Fullick, Ray & Powell, Geoffrey (2006) [1979]. Suez: The Double War. Barnsley, United Kingdom: Pen & Sword. ISBN 1-84415-340-1.
- Greenway, Ambrose (2014). Cross Channel and Short Sea Ferries. Barnsley, United Kingdom: Seaforth Publishing. ISBN 978-1-84832-170-0.
- Hacking, Norman (1995). Prince Ships of Northern B.C.: Ships of the Grand Trunk Pacific and Canadian National Railways. Surrey, British Columbia: Heritage House Publishing. ISBN 1-895811-28-7.
- Macpherson, Ken & Barrie, Ron (2002). The Ships of Canada's Naval Forces 1910–2002 (Third ed.). St. Catharines, Ontario: Vanwell Publishing. ISBN 1-55125-072-1.
- Milner, Marc (17 April 2010). "The Three Princes: Navy, Part 38". Legion Magazine.
- "Prince Henry (1156885)". Miramar Ship Index.
- Schull, Joseph (1961). The Far Distant Ships: An Official Account of Canadian Naval Operations in the Second World War. Ottawa: Queen's Printer. OCLC 19974782.
