= Sansovini =

Sansovini is an Italian surname. Notable people with the surname include:

- Glauco Sansovini (1938–2019), Sammarinese politician
- Marco Sansovini (born 1980), Italian footballer

== See also ==
- Sansovino (disambiguation)
