= SS Empire Broadsword =

World War II merchant ship of the United Kingdom

History
- Name: Cape Marshall (1943); Empire Broadsword (1943-44)
- Owner: War Shipping Administration
- Operator: Cunard White Star Line
- Port of registry: (United Kingdom) London
- Builder: Consolidated Steel Corporation, Wilmington, California
- Launched: 16 August 1943
- Completed: December 1943
- Out of service: 2 July 1944
- Identification: United Kingdom Official Number 169737; Code Letters MYMJ
- Fate: Struck a mine and sank

General characteristics
- Class & type: C1-S-AY-1 Infantry landing ship
- Tonnage: 7,177 GRT; 4,823 NRT
- Length: 396 ft 5 in (120.83 m)
- Beam: 60 ft 1 in (18.31 m)
- Depth: 35 ft (10.67 m)
- Propulsion: Steam turbines, double reduction geared driving a single screw
- Armament: 1 × 4 in gun; 1 × 12 pdr gun; 12 × 20mm guns

Location of the sinking of Empire Broadsword.

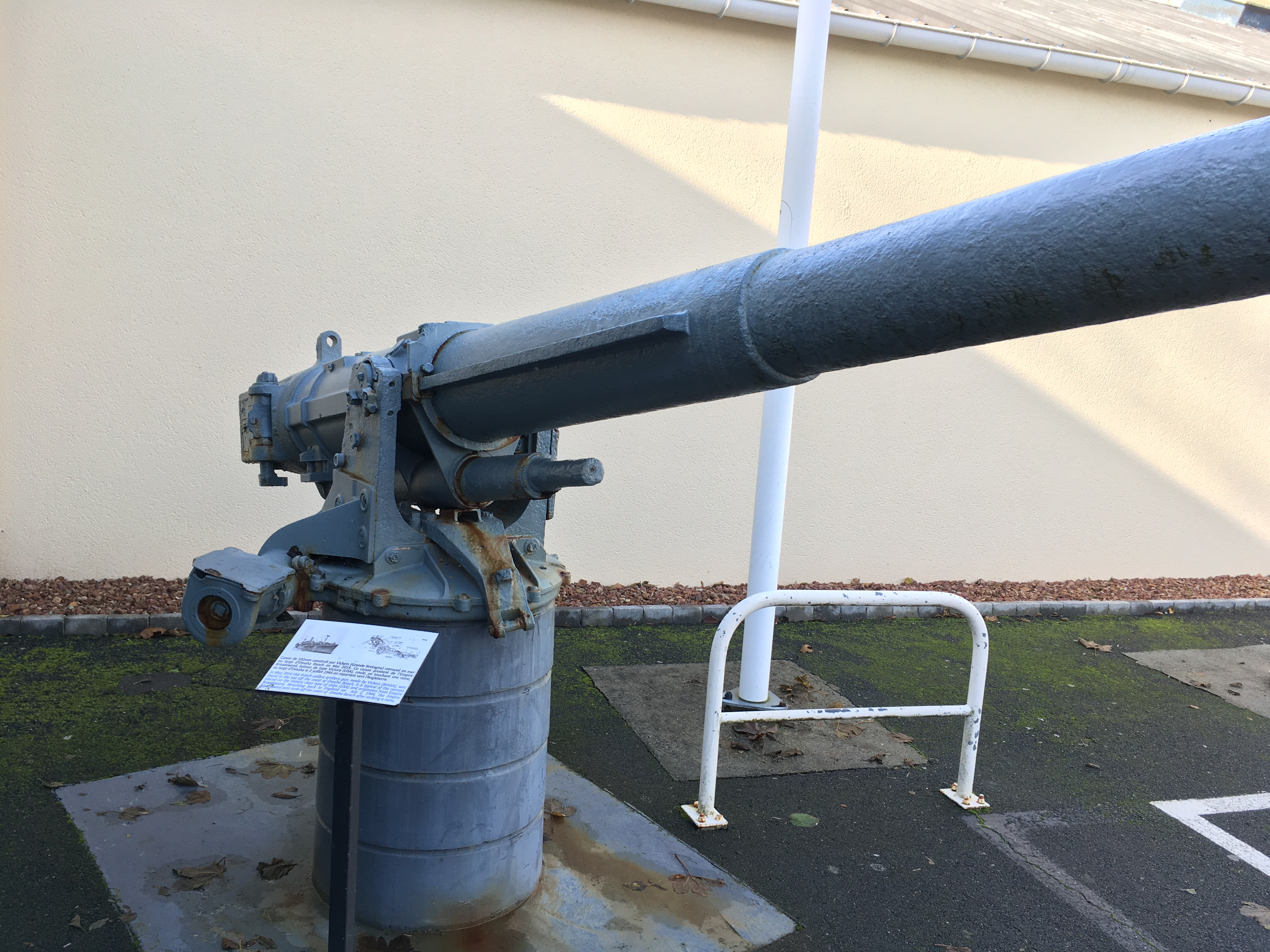
4 inch (102mm) artillery gun made by Vickers at the Omaha Museum, which originated from the Empire Broadsword

Empire Broadsword was a Type C1-S-AY-1 infantry landing ship built in 1943 as Cape Marshall. She was renamed Empire Broadsword before completion and entering into service for the Ministry of War Transport (MoWT). She had a short career, entering service in December 1943 and being sunk by a mine in July 1944.

== Construction ==
The ship was built by Consolidated Steel Corporation, Wilmington, California as yard number 348. She was launched on 16 August 1943 as Cape Marshall. She was 396 feet 5 inches (120.83 m) long, with a beam of 60 feet 1 inch (18.31 m) and a depth of 35 feet (10.67 m). She was propelled by two steam turbines which drove a single screw via double reduction gearing. The steam turbine were manufactured by Westinghouse Electrical and Manufacturing Corp, Essington, Pennsylvania.

== Career ==
The ship was transferred under the terms of lend lease shortly after being completed in 1943 under the name Empire Broadsword. She was chartered by the MoWT, and was operated under the management of Cunard White Star Line

Empire Broadsword was mined and sunk off Normandy on July 2, 1944, while supporting the allied invasion of Europe. Her position is 49°25′N 0°54′W. Seventy survivors were rescued by USS PC-1225. The wreck lies on its starboard side in 27 metres (89 ft) of water and is now a dive site. Those lost on Empire Broadsword are commemorated at the Tower Hill Memorial, London.

== Official Numbers and Code Letters ==
Official Numbers were a forerunner to IMO Numbers. Empire Broadsword had the UK Official Number 169737 and used the Code Letters MYMJ.

== Sources ==
- Colledge, J. J.; Warlow, Ben (2006) [1969]. Ships of the Royal Navy: The Complete Record of All Fighting Ships of the Royal Navy from the 15th Century to the Present (3rd Rev ed.). London: Chatham Publishing. ISBN 978-1-86176-281-8. OCLC 67375475.
