= HMS Rocksand (F184) =

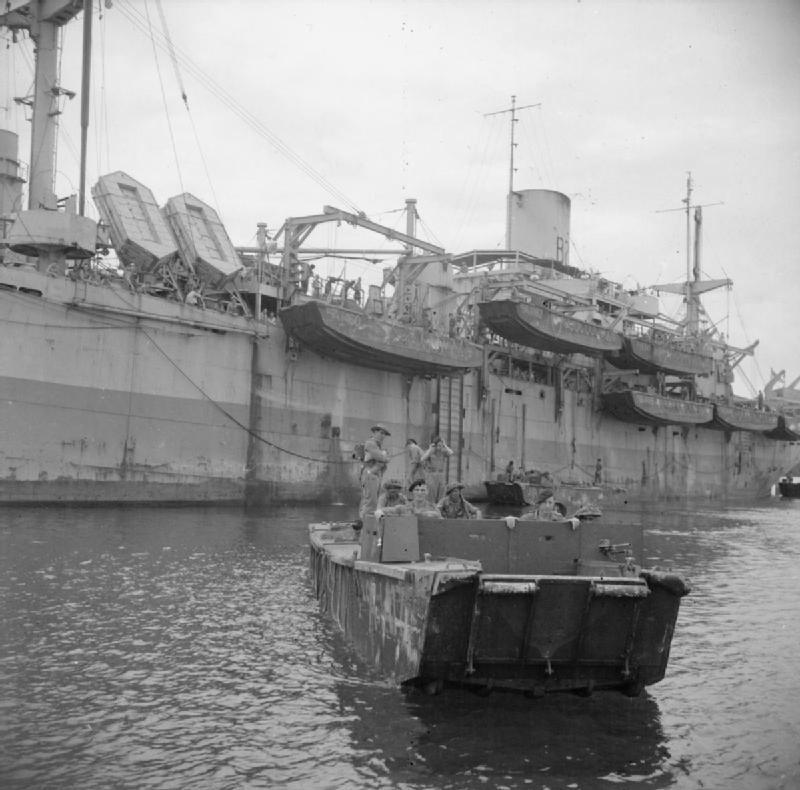
- A Landing Craft Assault (LCA) leaves HMS Rocksand for the island of Nancowry during the British occupation of the Nicobar islands in October 1945.

History

United Kingdom
- Name: Cape Argos (1943); Empire Anvil (1943-44); HMS Rocksand (1944-46); Empire Anvil (1946-48); Cape Argos (1948-50); Empire Anvil (1950-60); Hai Ya (1960-73); Fu Ming (1973-74)
- Owner: United States Maritime Commission (1943); Ministry of War Transport (1943-44); Royal Navy (1944-46); Ministry of War Transport (1946-47); United States Maritime Commission (1947-60); China Merchants Steam Navigation Co, Taiwan (1960-73); Yang Ming Marine Transport Corporation, Taiwan (1973-74)
- Operator: owner operated except:-; Furness, Withy & Co (1943-44, 1946-47)
- Port of registry: (United States) USA (1943-44); (United Kingdom) London (1944); (United Kingdom) Royal Navy (1944-46); (United Kingdom) UK (1946-47); (United States) USA (1947-60); (Taiwan) Republic of China (1960-74)
- Builder: Consolidated Steel Corporation, Wilmington, California
- Launched: 14 October 1943
- Commissioned: November 1944
- Out of service: 1974
- Identification: UK Official Number 169768 (1943-44, 1946-47); Pennant number F184 (1944-46); Taiwan Official Number 1472 (1960-74); Code Letters MYMP (1943-44)

General characteristics
- Tonnage: 7,177 tons grt
- Length: 396 ft 5 in (120.83 m)
- Beam: 60 ft 1 in (18.31 m)
- Depth: 35 ft (10.67 m)
- Propulsion: 2 x steam turbines (Westinghouse Electric & Manufacturing Co, Essington, Philadelphia), double reduction geared driving one screw.
- Armament: 1 × 4 in gun; 1 × 12 pdr gun; 12 × 20mm guns

HMS Rocksand was an infantry landing ship in service with the Royal Navy during the late stages of the Second World War. She was launched in 1943 as Cape Argos and renamed Empire Anvil before being taken into Royal Navy service. Postwar she reverted to Empire Anvil and then Cape Argos and back to Empire Anvil again. She spent ten years laid up before resuming service as Hai Ya and Fu Ming before being scrapped in 1974.

== Career ==
=== Wartime ===
HMS Rocksand was built by Consolidated Steel Corporation, Wilmington, California as the Cape Argos, and transferred under the terms of lend lease shortly after being completed in late 1943 under the name Empire Anvil. She was taken over by the Ministry of War Transport in 1944 and operated by Furness, Withy & Co. At the Normandy Landings, she and a sister ship Empire Javelin, were carrying US troops for Omaha Beach. In November 1944 she was requisitioned by the Admiralty and commissioned as HMS Rocksand, under which name she served out the remainder of the war.

=== Post war ===
HMS Rocksand participated in the reoccupation of the Nicobar Islands in October 1945, after which she was returned to the Ministry of War Transport in 1946, which briefly returned her to Furness, Withy & Co under her original name of Empire Anvil. By June 1946 she had been returned to the United States Navy. In May 1947, Empire Anvil transported 1,300 Ukrainian refugees from Venice, Italy to Liverpool, Lancashire. She was operated from 1947 by the United States Maritime Commission, under her original name of Cape Argos, until 1948. It was then arranged that she would be sold to China, and she was renamed Hai Ya in preparation. The arrangement was subsequently cancelled due to the Communist take over and also she was not paid for, and by 1950 she had been renamed Empire Anvil and was laid up in the James River, Virginia. She returned to service on 27 July 1960, when the deal finally went ahead. She was renamed Hai Ya, and entered service with the China Merchants Steam Navigation Co., of Taiwan. She sailed with them until 1973, when she was sold to Yang Ming Marine Transport Corporation, and renamed Fu Ming. She had a brief career with them, being scrapped at Keelung in 1974.
