= Sansovino (surname) =

Sansovino is an Italian surname. Notable people with the surname include:

- Andrea Sansovino (c. 1467–1529), Italian artist
- Francesco Sansovino (1521–1586), Italian scholar and son of Jacopo
- Jacopo Sansovino (1486–1570), Italian sculptor, architect, and father of Francesco

== See also ==
- Sansovino (disambiguation)
