= Landing ship, infantry =

British troopship class

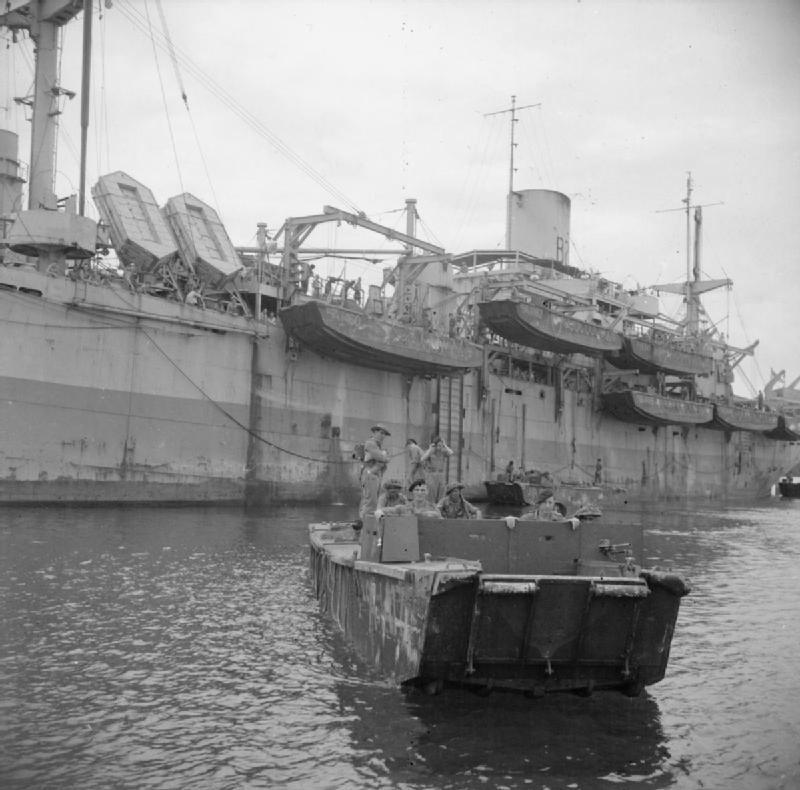
- LCAs leave HMS Rocksand, a landing ship, infantry, for the island of Nancowry in the British occupation of the Nicobar Islands, October 1945

Class overview
- Name: Landing ship, infantry
- Operators: Royal Navy; (United Kingdom) Ministry of War Transport; Royal Canadian Navy; Royal Indian Navy; Royal Australian Navy
- Succeeded by: Landing ship logistics
- Built: 1938–1945
- Completed: ~40
- Active: 0

General characteristics
- Boats & landing craft carried: 6 to 24 LCAs plus 3 LCMs or similar
- Troops: 150 to 1,500,
- Crew: 120 to 300 officers and ratings
- Armament: Typically a range of anti-aircraft guns
- Armour: Typically anti-splinter mattresses and gun shields

Landing ship, infantry (LSI) was a designation used for several types of British Commonwealth vessels designed to transport landing craft and troops for amphibious warfare during the Second World War. LSIs were operated by the Royal Navy, British Merchant Navy, Royal Canadian Navy, Royal Indian Navy, and Royal Australian Navy. They transported British Commonwealth and other Allied troops in sea assaults and invasions throughout the war.

Typically, an LSI would transport its cargo of infantry from its embarkation port to close to the coast to be invaded. This location (the "lowering position" in Royal Navy terminology) was approximately 6–11 miles off shore. The troops would then transfer to landing craft, most commonly LCAs, for the journey to the beach. The landing craft would return to the LSI after disembarking their cargo and be hoisted up to embark additional troops.

== Origins ==
In the years immediately before war was declared the Inter-Service Training and Development Centre sought to identify ships suitable to carry Army and Royal Marine formations being employed in amphibious operations. Such ships would not be purpose-built, but would be found within the lists of merchant marine vessels. These ships needed to be fast and have davits capable of lowering the new landing craft assault fully loaded with troops. Glengyle and her sisters, Glenearn, Glenroy, and Breconshire, then building, were determined to be ideal for infantry landing ships. This class of four fast passenger and cargo liners were intended for the Far East trade route. The Admiralty acquired the four Glens shortly after their launchings, and converted them into fast supply ships. By June 1940, Glengyle, Glenearn, and Glenroy were under conversion to LSI(L)s. The Admiralty insisted on keeping Breconshire in a fast cargo configuration, so the ISTDC consulted the Director of Naval Construction about suitable requisitioned ships. The Dutch Continental passenger steamers Queen Emma and Princess Beatrix were converted to LSIs. Displacing approximately 3,000 gross registered tons and able to make 22 knots, these vessels could carry as many as 800 troops apiece. These were the original 5 LSIs. More LSIs would be found in the years to come from requisitioning or new construction provided by the United States under Lend-Lease.

== Design and conversion ==
LSIs were grouped according to their troop capacity and endurance. Initially, all were requisitioned merchant vessels that exchanged carrying lifeboats for landing craft. During April and June 1940, the Glens underwent further conversion into LSIs capable of transporting an embarked force of up to 34 officers and 663 other ranks and carrying 12 LCAs on Welin-McLachan davits and 1 LCM(1) stored in chocks on deck and launched by 30-ton derricks. Glengyle was built by Caledon Shipbuilding & Engineering Company, Dundee, for the Glen Line. The only vital alterations to the 18 knot Glengyle and her sisters, Glenroy and Glenearn, were to assure davits strong enough to lower fully loaded LCAs, and to provide accommodation for the army units to be transported. This latter alteration entailed introducing tables, forms, and posts for slinging hammocks into the former cargo hold. Glengyle, the first LSI, was accepted into service on 10 September and, on 31 January 1941, she sailed around Africa to the Mediterranean.

Smaller LSI, such as Queen Emma and Princess Beatrix, were generally converted cross-channel ferries, or a converted passenger ship.

Conversion was accomplished, as with LSI(L), by adding davits for the landing craft, providing troop accommodation, plus some defensive armament, such as QF 12 pounder 12 cwt naval guns, and anti-aircraft guns, such as the 20 mm Oerlikon cannon.

In Canada in the spring of 1943, work was under way on the conversion of Prince David and Prince Henry to landing ship infantry (medium) (LSI (M)). They were reconfigured to carry 550 infantrymen transported in six LCAs and two LCM(1)s, and have large sick-bay facilities for the anticipated casualties. Their old 6-inch (152 mm) guns were replaced with two twin 4 inch mountings, two single Bofors 40mm guns, and ten Oerlikons. The rebuilding, which took place at Esquimalt and Vancouver, was completed in December 1943 and shortly after re-commissioning, she left for the United Kingdom via Panama canal and New York City, under Captain T.D. Kelly RCNR, (her final commanding officer) who had supervised the fitting-out of both ships. The ship's davits were capable of lifting an LCA which, by this time in the war, was approaching 14 tons.

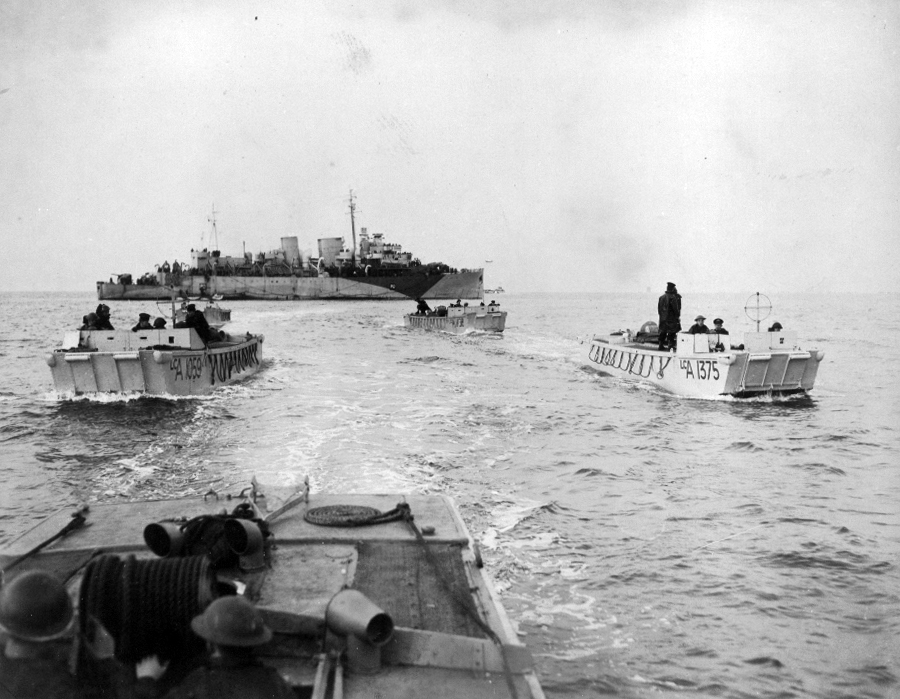
Four LCAs go ashore from HMCS Prince David off Bernières-sur-Mer, France, 6 June 1944

In Australia in mid-1942, HMAS Manoora, an ocean liner that had been converted to armed merchant cruiser, was marked for conversion into the Royal Australian Navy's first landing ship, infantry at Garden Island Dockyard. Her armament was removed and replaced with a single 12-pounder gun, six 40 mm Bofors, and eight 20 mm Oerlikons. The Supermarine Walrus amphibian aircraft was removed, and the ship was modified to carry US manufactured landing craft: 17 LCVPs, and two LCM(3)s. Manoora was initially able to accommodate 850 soldiers, but later modifications increased this to 1,250. The ship was recommissioned on 2 February 1943 with the pennant number C77, and after spending six months on amphibious warfare training in Port Phillip, was deployed to New Guinea.

In the United States, a commercial hull was put in war production by the Maritime Commission; the C1-S-AY1 subtype of thirteen ships built by the Consolidated Steel Corporation, were modified for use as LSI(L)s under lend-lease. These ships were all given two-word names beginning with "Empire", such as SS Empire Spearhead. All were able to accommodate two LCA flotillas; a total of 24 craft. The Empire Broadsword was lost during the invasion of Normandy to a mine. Empire Javelin was sunk by a U-boat torpedo on 28 December 1944. All these ships had davits fitted to accept LCAs and the other appropriate British manufactured landing craft for LSIs.

Normally British converted LSIs were fitted with heavy-duty power-operated davits. Early landing ships were fitted with Welin-McLachlin davits – these being generally in use in the Merchant Navy for standard 99 man lifeboats. As the weight of LCAs increased through the war (eventually approaching 14 tons) heavier davits were required. Later LSIs and those being refitted were provisioned with luffing davits of a crossbeam type. The davits themselves provided a demarcation between the responsibilities of the LSI crew (either Royal Navy or Merchant Navy) and the members of the LCA flotilla.

== Manning the LSI ==
Some of the LSIs were commissioned into the Royal Navy, received navy crews, and flew the White Ensign, while most retained their civilian crews and flew the Red Ensign. Royal Navy LSIs had Royal Navy landing craft flotillas assigned to them until 1943, when a proportion of landing craft flotillas were manned by Royal Marine crews. Merchant Navy LSIs would have Royal Navy gunners for the anti-aircraft equipment, and Royal Navy officers and ratings operating the ship’s flotilla of landing craft. Generally, these divisions of personnel did not cooperate or share in each other's work responsibilities.

LSIs in Royal Canadian Navy service were crewed by Canadians and, by late 1943 onwards, were assigned RCN landing craft flotillas. The crews intermingled, lent a hand as needed in one another's work, and messed together.

== Ship designations ==
LSI(S)	Landing ship, infantry (small)
LSI(M)	Landing ship, infantry (medium)
LSI(L)	Landing ship, infantry (large)
LSI(H)	Landing ship, infantry (hand-hoisting)

== Ships ==
- SS Ben-my-Chree – Isle of Man Steam Packet Company passenger ferry. Served at Pointe du Hoc with 2nd US Rangers, 6 June 1944
- TSS Duke of York
- SS El Hind – hired as LSI(L) in 1943, destroyed by fire in Bombay docks, April 1944
- HMS Cicero
- HMS Empire Battleaxe
- SS Empire Broadsword – LSI(L)
- HMS Sansovino
- SS Empire Javelin – LSI(L)
- HMS Empire Spearhead
- HMS Glengyle – LSI(L), 10,000 tons, 700 troops
- HMS Glenearn – LSI(L)
- HMS Glenroy – LSI(L)
- HMS Invicta – LSI(S)
- HMAS Kanimbla
- SS Karanja – LSI(L), sunk off Algeria, 1942
- MV Llangibby Castle
- SS Llanstephan Castle - Union Castle Line, 11,293 GRT - sister ship of HMHS Llandovery Castle
- HMAS Manoora
- HMNZS Monowai – formerly an ocean-going passenger ship
- Belgian ferry SS Princesse Marie-José
- HMS Prince Charles
- HMCS Prince David – LSI(M), 500 troops
- HMCS Prince Henry – LSI(M) former passenger liner
- HMS Prince Leopold – LSI(S), former Belgian cross channel ferry, torpedoed in 1944 by U-621
- HMS Princess Astrid – LSI(S)
- HMS Princess Beatrix – LSI(M)
- HMS Princess Josephine Charlotte – LSI(S)
- HMS Prince Albert
- HMS Queen Emma – LSI(M)
- HMS Rocksand – formerly Cape Argos then Empire Anvil
- HMS Royal Scotsman – LSI(H), former passenger ferry operating in the Irish Sea
- HMS Royal Ulsterman
- HMS Sainfoin – formerly Empire Crossbow
- HMS St Helier – LSI(H) former Channel Island ferry
- MS Sobieski with LCP(L)s
- HMS Ulster Monarch – LSI(H), former passenger ferry operating in the Irish Sea
- HMAS Westralia
- HMS Worcestershire

== See also ==
- Auxiliary personnel attack ship - US term for a similar ship
- Landing craft assault
