= Sansovino =

Sansovino may refer to:

- A.C. Sansovino, a football club
- HMS Sansovino (F162), a LSI (L) in service during 1945
- Sansovino (horse), winner of the 1924 Epsom Derby
- Sansovino (surname)
