= HMS Sansovino =

1943 Royal Navy infantry landing ship

History
- Name: Empire Cutlass (1943–45); HMS Sansovino (1945); Empire Cutlass (1945–60); Hai Ou (1960–70)
- Owner: United States Maritime Commission (1943); Ministry of War Transport (1943–45); Royal Navy (1945); Ministry of War Transport (1945); Ministry of Transport (1945–47); United States Maritime Commission (1947–60); China Merchants Steam Navigation Co Ltd (1960–70)
- Operator: Furness, Withy & Co Ltd (1943–45); Royal Navy (1945); Furness, Withy & Co Ltd (1945–47); United States Maritime Commission (1947–60); China Merchants Steam Navigation Co Ltd (1960–70)
- Port of registry: United States (1943); (United Kingdom) London (1943–45); (United Kingdom) Royal Navy (1945); (United Kingdom) London (1945–47); United States (1947–60); Taiwan (1960–70)
- Builder: Consolidated Steel Corporation, Wilmington, California
- Launched: 29 July 1943
- Completed: November 1943
- Commissioned: January 1945
- Decommissioned: June 1945
- Maiden voyage: 21 November 1943
- Out of service: 1948–1960
- Identification: United Kingdom Official Number 169740 (1943–45, 1945–47); Code Letters MYMG (1943–45, 1945–47); Pennant number F162 (1945)
- Fate: Scrapped in 1970

General characteristics
- Class & type: C-1-S-AY1, finished as Infantry landing ship, later a cargo ship
- Tonnage: 7,177 GRT
- Length: 418 ft (127 m) (overall); 396 ft (121 m) (between perpendiculars)
- Beam: 50 ft (15 m)
- Propulsion: Steam turbines
- Speed: 14 knots (26 km/h)
- Boats & landing craft carried: sixteen Landing Craft Assault (HMS Sansovino)
- Capacity: 1,458 troops
- Complement: 250
- Armament: 16 × LCA, 2 × LCVP, 1 × LCSM or 1 × LCM, 1 × 4-inch gun; 1 × 12 pdr gun; 12 × 20mm guns (World War II)

HMS Sansovino was an infantry landing ship in service with the Royal Navy during the late stages of the Second World War.

She was built in 1943 by Consolidated Steel Corporation, Wilmington, California, as the Cape Compass for the United States Maritime Commission (USMC). She was transferred to the Ministry of War Transport (MoWT) on completion and renamed Empire Cutlass. In January 1945, she was requisitioned by the Royal Navy as HMS Sansovino, serving until June when she was returned to the MoWT, regaining her former name Empire Cutlass. In 1947, she was returned to the USMC. A proposed sale in 1948 to China fell through due to the outbreak of the Chinese Civil War and the ship was laid up in the James River, Virginia. In 1960, she was sold to Taiwan and renamed Hai Ou, serving until 1970 when she was scrapped at Kaohsiung.

== Description ==
The ship was built in 1943 by Consolidated Steel Corporation, Wilmington, California. She was 418 feet (127 m) long overall, 396 ft (121 m) between perpendiculars, with a beam of 50 ft (15 m). She was assessed as 7,177 GRT, 11,650 DWT.

The ship was powered by a geared steam turbine of 4,400 shp. This was supplied by two boilers and drove a single screw propeller. It could propel the ship at 14 knots (26 km/h).

== History ==
=== World War II ===
The ship was laid down at Cape Compass, but completed as Empire Cutlass. A Type C1-S-AY-1 ship, she was completed in November 1943. She was transferred to the MoWT under the terms of lend lease shortly after being completed, and renamed Empire Cutlass. Her port of registry was London. The United Kingdom Official Number 169740 and Code Letters MYMG were allocated. Furness, Withy & Co.

Empire Cutlass departed from Los Angeles, California, on her maiden voyage on 21 November 1943, sailing to Balboa, arriving on 1 December. She then sailed to Cristóbal, Panama, where she joined Convoy ZG 52, which arrived at Guantánamo Bay, Cuba on 14 December. She then joined Convoy GN 102, which departed from Guantanamo Bay the next day and arrived at New York on 22 December. On 9 January 1944, Empire Cutlass departed from New York as a member of Convoy CU 11, which arrived at Liverpool, Lancashire, United Kingdom on 20 January. She left the convoy at the Clyde, arriving that day. On 30 January, she departed form the Clyde for Loch Ewe, where she joined Convoy WN 539, which arrived at Methil, Fife on 2 February. She left the convoy at Invergordon, Ross-shire on 1 February.

She was converted to a LSI (L), carrying sixteen Landing Craft Assault (LCA) for the D-Day landings on 6 June 1944. On D-Day she carried the South Lancashire Regiment for Sword Beach. She carried 16 × LCA, 2 × LCVP, 1 × LCSM or 1 × LCM. She could carry 1,458 troops in addition to her complement of 250 officers and men. Armament consisted of 1 × 4-inch gun, 1 × 12 pdr gun, 12 × 20mm guns.

During the Normandy Landings, she had near misses from two torpedoes and suffered heavy shelling from Le Havre. Empire Cutlass lost eight of her sixteen LCAs. On 13 June, Empire Cutlass transported members of the 712th Railway Operating Battalion, Transportation Corps, United States Army to France. Although the ship arrived the next day, it was not until 16 June that the troops were able to disembark, due to the weather.

Later in June while in the Solent, a V-1 flying bomb brought down by her barrage balloon exploded on her starboard side. She continued to ferry troops from England to France after repairs. On 21 November she was damaged by an oyster mine off the Digne Light, Le Havre, France, but no casualties were reported. She was sent for repairs in Falmouth.

In 1945 she was requisitioned by the Admiralty and commissioned as HMS Sansovino, under which name she served out the remainder of the war. Sansovino participated in Operation Zipper in September 1945.

=== Post-war ===
On 18 January 1946 she was in the Pacific when the Highland Brigade, carrying two thousand Indian troops, struck a mine off Singapore. The Sansovino, which was carrying troops of the 2nd Battalion West Yorkshire Regiment from Soerabaja, came to the aid of the stricken Highland Brigade, and took 110 Indian troops off with her landing craft. The Highland Brigade was subsequently towed into Singapore. She was returned to the Ministry of War Transport in June 1946, which returned her to Furness, Withy & Co under her original name of Empire Cutlass. She was returned to the United States Navy in 1947 and operated by the United States Maritime Commission.

In 1947, she was returned to the USMC. On 8 October 1947, she was allocated to the Reserve Fleet and laid up in the James River, Virginia. In 1948, an attempt was made by China to purchase the ship, and she was renamed Hai Ou in preparation. Although Empire Cutlass was withdrawn from the Reserve Fleet on 29 April 1948 and delivered to Norfolk, Virginia, the sale fell through due to the outbreak of the Chinese Civil War. The ship was arrested as it had not been paid for. It was held by Dichman, Wright & Pugh awaiting disposal. Empire Cutlass re-entered the Reserve Fleet on 28 August 1950. On 21 December 1951, a recommendation was made that the ship be scrapped. She was reported to be slightly damaged, with repairs estimated at $35,000 and conversion costs estimated at $395,000. She remained in the Reserve Fleet on the James River.

In 1960, she was sold to Taiwan, and was withdrawn from the Reserve Fleet on 27 July. Empire Cutlass was renamed Hai Ou, and entered service with the China Merchants Steam Navigation Co., of Taiwan. On 8 March 1962, Hai Ou collided with the Japanese steamship Tomoshima Maru at Kobe. She sailed with them until 1970, when she was sold for breaking up, being scrapped at Kaohsiung, Taiwan by 15 October 1970.
