= HMCS Dawson =

Flower-class corvette

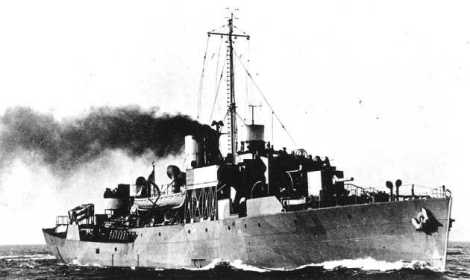
- HMCS Dawson

History

Canada
- Name: Dawson
- Namesake: Dawson City, Yukon
- Ordered: 14 February 1940
- Builder: Victoria Machinery Depot, Victoria
- Laid down: 7 September 1940
- Launched: 8 February 1941
- Commissioned: 6 October 1941
- Decommissioned: 19 June 1945
- Home port: Esquimalt, British Columbia; Halifax, Nova Scotia
- Identification: pennant number: K104
- Honours and awards: Aleutians 1942-43, Atlantic 1944-45, Gulf of St. Lawrence 1944
- Fate: Foundered 1946; raised and broken up.

General characteristics
- Class & type: Flower-class corvette (original)
- Displacement: 925 long tons (940 t; 1,036 short tons)
- Length: 205 ft (62.48 m)o/a
- Beam: 33 ft (10.06 m)
- Draught: 11.5 ft (3.51 m)
- Propulsion: single shaft; 2 × fire tube Scotch boilers; 1 × 4-cycle triple-expansion reciprocating steam engine; 2,750 ihp (2,050 kW)
- Speed: 16 knots (29.6 km/h)
- Range: 3,500 nautical miles (6,482 km) at 12 knots (22.2 km/h)
- Complement: 85
- Sensors & processing systems: 1 × SW1C or 2C radar; 1 × Type 123A or Type 127DV sonar
- Armament: 1 × BL 4 in (102 mm) Mk.IX single gun; 2 × .50 cal machine gun (twin); 2 × Lewis .303 cal machine gun (twin); 2 × Mk.II depth charge throwers; 2 × depth charge rails with 40 depth charges; originally fitted with minesweeping gear, later removed

HMCS Dawson was a Flower-class corvette that served in the Royal Canadian Navy (RCN) during the Second World War. She was one of the few Canadian corvettes to serve in action in both oceans. She was named for Dawson City, Yukon.

== Background ==
Flower-class corvettes like Dawson serving with the Royal Canadian Navy during the Second World War were different from earlier and more traditional sail-driven corvettes. The "corvette" designation was created by the French as a class of small warships; the Royal Navy borrowed the term for a period but discontinued its use in 1877. During the hurried preparations for war in the late 1930s, Winston Churchill reactivated the corvette class, needing a name for smaller ships used in an escort capacity, in this case based on a whaling ship design. The generic name "flower" was used to designate the class of these ships, which – in the Royal Navy – were named after flowering plants.

Corvettes commissioned by the Royal Canadian Navy during the Second World War were named after communities for the most part, to better represent the people who took part in building them. This idea was put forth by Admiral Percy W. Nelles. Sponsors were commonly associated with the community for which the ship was named. Royal Navy corvettes were designed as open sea escorts, while Canadian corvettes were developed for coastal auxiliary roles which was exemplified by their minesweeping gear. Eventually the Canadian corvettes would be modified to allow them to perform better on the open seas.

== Construction ==
Dawson was ordered on 14 February 1940 from Victoria Machinery Depot, Victoria, British Columbia as part of the 1939-1940 Flower-class building program. She was laid down on 7 September 1940 and was launched on 8 February 1941. She was commissioned into the RCN on 6 October 1941 at Victoria. In September 1943 Dawson began a major refit at Vancouver that saw her fo'c'sle extended. She had a second refit at Dartmouth that began in January 1945 that lasted until April.

== Wartime service ==
Dawson was one of the few RCN ships that played an active role in both the Pacific War and the Battle of the Atlantic. After initial workups, she was assigned to Esquimalt Force. From 1942 to 1944 Dawson was deployed in an anti-submarine role on the Pacific coast as a local escort. In August 1942 she and her sister, HMCS Vancouver were assigned to the American invasion of the Aleutian Islands. There was little risk to the corvettes as they met very little resistance at sea. On 4 November 1942 she returned to Esquimalt. In February 1943 she returned to work with the United States Navy in Alaska until the end of May.

After completing her major refit Dawson transferred to the Atlantic in February 1944. Upon arrival in March she joined escort group W-7 as part of the Western Escort Force. She escorted convoys from North America to the UK for the remainder of her war. After undergoing a second major refit, Dawson worked up in Bermuda in April 1945 but did not return to active service before the European part of the war ended.

== Post-war service ==
Dawson was paid off on 19 June 1945 at Sorel, Quebec. The ship was sold for scrap on 5 October 1945. On the way to the breakers, she foundered near Hamilton, Ontario on 22 March 1946. She was raised and broken up.

== See also ==
- Battle of the St. Lawrence
