= HMCS Vancouver (K240) =

Flower-class corvette

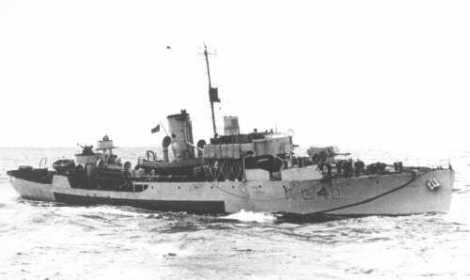
- HMCS Vancouver

History

Canada
- Name: Vancouver
- Namesake: Vancouver, British Columbia
- Builder: Yarrows Ltd., Esquimalt
- Laid down: 16 June 1941
- Launched: 26 August 1941
- Commissioned: 20 March 1942
- Decommissioned: 26 June 1945
- Identification: Pennant number: K240
- Honours and awards: Aleutians 1942–43; Atlantic 1944–45
- Fate: Sold for scrapping 1946

General characteristics
- Class & type: Flower-class corvette
- Displacement: 950 long tons (970 t; 1,060 short tons)
- Length: 203 ft (61.87 m)
- Beam: 33 ft (10.06 m)
- Draught: 13 ft (3.96 m)
- Propulsion: 1940–1941 program; single shaft; 2 × water tube boilers; 1 × double acting triple-expansion reciprocating steam engine; 2,750 ihp (2,050 kW)
- Speed: 16.5 knots (30.6 km/h)
- Range: 3,500 nautical miles (6,482 km) at 12 knots (22.2 km/h)
- Complement: 5 officers, 61 enlisted
- Sensors & processing systems: 1 × SW1C or 2C radar; 1 × Type 123A or Type 127DV sonar
- Armament: 1 × BL 4-inch (101.6 mm) Mk.IX single gun; 1 × 2-pounder Mk.VIII single "pom-pom"; 4 × Mk.II depth charge throwers; 2 depth charge rails with 60 depth charges

HMCS Vancouver was a Flower-class corvette that served with the Royal Canadian Navy during the Second World War. She saw action primarily in both Atlantic and Pacific theatres. She was named for Vancouver, British Columbia. She was the second commissioned ship and the third overall to bear the name Vancouver.

== Background ==
Flower-class corvettes like Vancouver serving with the Royal Canadian Navy during the Second World War were different from earlier and more traditional sail-driven corvettes. The "corvette" designation was created by the French as a class of small warships; the Royal Navy borrowed the term for a period but discontinued its use in 1877. During the hurried preparations for war in the late 1930s, Winston Churchill reactivated the corvette class, needing a name for smaller ships used in an escort capacity, in this case based on a whaling ship design. The generic name "flower" was used to designate the class of these ships, which – in the Royal Navy – were named after flowering plants.

Corvettes commissioned by the Royal Canadian Navy during the Second World War were named after communities for the most part, to better represent the people who took part in building them. This idea was put forth by Admiral Percy W. Nelles. Sponsors were commonly associated with the community for which the ship was named. Royal Navy corvettes were designed as open sea escorts, while Canadian corvettes were developed for coastal auxiliary roles which was exemplified by their minesweeping gear. Eventually the Canadian corvettes would be modified to allow them to perform better on the open seas.

== Construction ==
Vancouver was commissioned as part of the 1940–1941 Flower-class building program. She was identical to those from the 1939–1940 program with a few modifications. Notably, the 1940–41 program featured water-tube boilers, which, while less responsive, offered greater reliability in maintaining a consistent supply of steam. The second significant change was that no minesweeping gear was ever installed, as the role of the corvette had changed from coastal auxiliary to convoy escort.

Vancouver was originally ordered as HMCS Kitchener but was renamed before launching. She was laid down 16 June 1941 by Yarrows Ltd. at Esquimalt, British Columbia and launched 26 August 1941. She was commissioned 20 March 1942 at Esquimalt. During her career, Vancouver had two major refits. The first significant overhaul took place at Vancouver from June to mid-September 1943. During this refit she had her fo'c'sle extended. Her second major refit took place at Charlottetown, Prince Edward Island from September to November 1944.

== Service history ==
After workups, Vancouver was initially assigned to Esquimalt Force. On 20 June 1942, she escorted SS Fort Camosun to Victoria after she had been torpedoed by the Japanese submarine I-25. In August 1942, she was assigned to the American-led Aleutian Islands Campaign, staying with them until October. After returning to Canada she remained with Esquimalt Force until 24 February 1943 when she was placed again under American control as part of D-Force until the end of May.

After departing for refit in June 1943, Vancouver returned to service with Esquimalt Force and served with them until she was assigned to the East coast in February 1944 to replace corvettes departing for duties associated with Operation Neptune. She arrived at Halifax, Nova Scotia 25 March, having made the journey with HMCS Dawson. She was immediately assigned to the Western Local Escort Force (WLEF).

During her time with WLEF Vancouver served briefly with escort group W-3 before joining W-1. In June 1944 she transferred to Quebec Force, escorting convoys between Quebec and Labrador. She departed for her final refit in September 1944. After workups in Bermuda she returned to service with WLEF as part of group W-1 and remained with them until the end of the war.

After the cessation of hostilities, Vancouver was paid off at Sorel, Quebec 26 June 1945. She was transferred to the War Assets Corporation for disposal. She was sold for scrap 5 October 1945 and broken up at Hamilton, Ontario in 1946.
