= HMS Empire Spearhead =

Landing Ship in British Ministry of War Transport

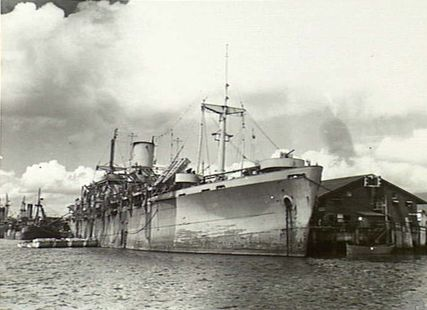
- HMS Empire Spearhead, 12 October 1945

History
- Name: SS Cape Girardeau (1943–44); SS Empire Spearhead (1944); HMS Empire Spearhead (1944–45); HMS Ormonde (1945–46); SS Empire Spearhead (1946–47); SS Cape Girardeau (1947–50); SS Empire Spearhead (1950–66)
- Owner: War Shipping Administration (1943–44); Royal Navy (1944–46); War Shipping Administration (1946–47); United States Maritime Commission (1947–66)
- Operator: Royal Mail Lines Ltd (1944); Royal Navy (1944–46); Ministry of Transport (1946–47); United States Maritime Commission (1947–66)
- Port of registry: (United Kingdom) London (1944); (United Kingdom) Royal Navy (1944–46); (United Kingdom) London (1946–47); United States (1947–66)
- Builder: Consolidated Steel Corporation
- Yard number: 354
- Launched: 7 November 1943
- Completed: January 1944
- Out of service: 1950–66
- Identification: Code Letters MYMB (1944–45, 1946–47); United Kingdom Official Number 169773 (1944, 1946–47); Pennant Number F172 (1944–46)
- Fate: Scrapped

General characteristics
- Class & type: Type C1-S-AY-1 cargo ship
- Tonnage: 7,177 GRT; 4,823 NRT
- Length: 396 ft 5 in (120.83 m)
- Beam: 60 ft 1 in (18.31 m)
- Depth: 35 ft 0 in (10.67 m)
- Installed power: Two steam turbines
- Propulsion: Screw propeller

HMS Empire Spearhead was a Type C1-S-AY-1 Infantry Landing Ship (LSI) chartered by the British Ministry of War Transport (MoWT) during World War II. She was built by Consolidated Steel Corporation, Wilmington, California. She was launched as Cape Girardeau and completed as Empire Spearhead. In 1945, she was transferred to the Royal Navy and was later renamed HMS Ormonde. Later that year she was transferred back to the MoWT and renamed Empire Spearhead. In 1947, she was transferred to the United States Maritime Commission and renamed Cape Girardeau. The ship was laid up in 1950 and renamed Empire Spearhead. She was scrapped in 1966.

== Description ==
The ship was built in 1944 as yard number 354 by Consolidated Steel Corporation Wilmington, California. She was launched on 7 November 1944, and completed in January 1944.

The ship was 396 feet 5 inches (120.83 m) long, with a beam of 60 feet 1 inch (18.31 m). She had a depth of 35 feet 0 inches (10.67 m). The ship had a GRT of 7,177 and a NRT of 4,823.

The ship was propelled by two steam turbines, double reduction geared, driving a single screw propeller. The turbines were built by Westinghouse Electric Company, Essington, Pennsylvania.

== History ==
Cape Girardeau was launched in January 1944, and completed that month as Empire Spearhead. She was built for the War Shipping Administration and chartered by the MoWT, who placed her under the management of Royal Mail Lines Ltd. The Code Letters MYMR and United Kingdom Official Number 169773 were allocated.

She took part in Operation Overlord. A photographer from the Daily Sketch was on board to record the invasion flotilla. The ship also carried members of the 231st Infantry Brigade, 1st Battalion, Dorset Regiment. The troops were landed on Gold Beach.

At the end of June 1944, Empire Spearhead was transferred to the Royal Navy as HMS Empire Spearhead.

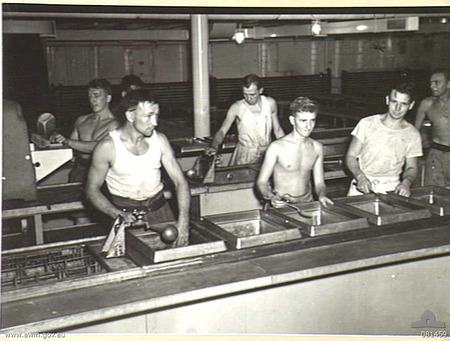
The Mess Deck of Empire Spearhead, 12 October 1944

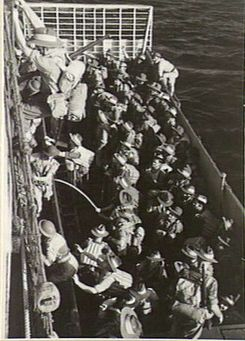
Troops from Empire Spearhead taking part in Exercise Octopus, 13 November 1944

Following Overlord, Empire Spearhead was part of Force X. This was a convoy consisting seven ships, HMS Lothian, SS Clan Lamont, SS Empire Arquebus, HMS Empire Battleaxe, SS Empire Mace, HMS Empire Spearhead, and HMS Glenearn. The convoy sailed from Greenock on 3 August as part of Convoy UC 31. Force X sailed via New York and the Panama Canal, arriving at Suva, Fiji, where the convoy dispersed, in late September. In November 1944, Empire Spearhead took part in Exercise Octopus at Unity Beach, Queensland. The exercise trained troops for amphibious landings.

In March 1945, Empire Spearhead took part in Operation Iceberg. She departed Manus Island, Papua New Guinea on 19 March and arrived at Leyte Gulf, Philippines on 26 March. She was briefly renamed HMS Ormonde during her last months in the Royal Navy.

In 1946, she was transferred back to the MoWT as Empire Spearhead. She passed to the United States Maritime Commission in 1947 and was renamed Cape Girardeau A proposed sale in February 1948 to the China and renaming to Hai Wei was not proceeded with as the ship was not paid for by China. In 1950, she was laid up on the James River and renamed Empire Spearhead. She was sold for scrap on 17 March 1965 to The Boston Metals Co. Empire Spearhead was withdrawn from the Reserve Fleet on 3 May. She arrived on 4 May at Baltimore, Ohio for scrapping. Empire Spearhead was scrapped in 1966.
