= Alamosa (disambiguation) =

Alamosa may stand for:

- Alamosa, Colorado
- Alamosa County, Colorado
- Alamosa River
- Alamosa National Wildlife Refuge
- USS Alamosa
- Alamosa springsnail
