= USS Beaverhead =

Cargo ship of the United States Navy

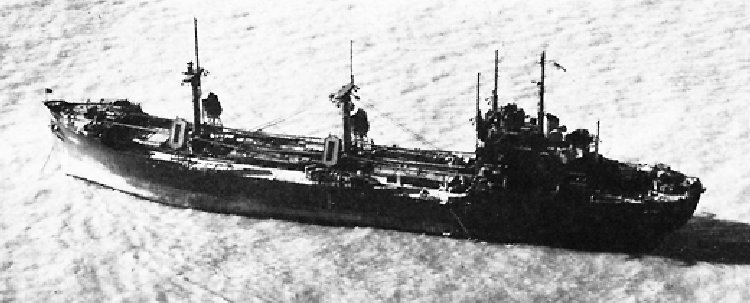
- USS Beaverhead (AK-161) at anchor, date and location unknown.

History

United States
- Name: Beaverhead
- Namesake: Beaverhead County, Montana
- Ordered: as type (C1-M-AV1) hull, MC hull 2106
- Builder: Kaiser Shipbuilding Co., Richmond, California
- Yard number: 63
- Laid down: 15 June 1944
- Launched: 2 September 1944
- Sponsored by: Mrs. T. H. Purdom, Jr.
- Acquired: 3 January 1945
- Commissioned: 3 January 1945
- Decommissioned: 8 March 1946
- Stricken: 28 March 1946
- Identification: Hull symbol: AK-161; Code letters: NEFS
- Fate: Sold, 28 March 1947, to Koninklijke Nederlandsche StoombootMattschappij N.V., Amsterdam

Netherlands
- Name: Hera
- Owner: Koninklijke Nederlandsche StoombootMattschappij N.V.
- Acquired: 28 March 1947
- Fate: Sold 1963

Panama
- Name: Omar Express (1963–1967); Cementos Ponce (1967–1976); Vanessa (1976–1982)
- Owner: Bahamas Lines, Panama
- Acquired: 1963
- Refit: 1967, to a self-unloading cement carrier
- Identification: IMO number: 5407590
- Fate: Scrapped at Veracruz, Mexico between 1982 and 1984

General characteristics
- Class & type: Alamosa-class cargo ship
- Type: C1-M-AV1
- Tonnage: 5,032 long tons deadweight (DWT)
- Displacement: 2,382 long tons (2,420 t) (standard); 7,450 long tons (7,570 t) (full load)
- Length: 388 ft 8 in (118.47 m)
- Beam: 50 ft (15 m)
- Draft: 21 ft 1 in (6.43 m)
- Installed power: 1 × Nordberg, TSM 6 diesel engine; 1,750 shp (1,300 kW)
- Propulsion: 1 × propeller
- Speed: 11.5 kn (21.3 km/h; 13.2 mph)
- Capacity: 3,945 t (3,883 long tons) DWT; 9,830 cu ft (278 m^{3}) (refrigerated); 227,730 cu ft (6,449 m^{3}) (non-refrigerated)
- Complement: 15 Officers; 70 Enlisted
- Armament: 1 × 3 in (76 mm)/50 caliber dual-purpose gun (DP); 6 × 20 mm (0.8 in) Oerlikon anti-aircraft (AA) cannons

USS Beaverhead (AK-161) was an Alamosa-class cargo ship commissioned by the U.S. Navy for service in World War II. She was responsible for delivering troops, goods and equipment to locations in the war zone.

== Service history ==
Beaverhead was laid down on 15 June 1944 at Richmond, California, by Kaiser Cargo, Inc., under a Maritime Commission contract, MC hull 2106; launched on 2 September 1944; sponsored by Mrs. T. H. Purdom Jr.; and commissioned on 3 January 1945. Beaverhead was fitted out at the Naval Supply Depot at Oakland, California, and then underwent a brief conversion at the Naval Sea Frontier Base, Treasure Island, California. Beaverhead departed the San Francisco Bay area on 22 January bound for San Pedro, Los Angeles, and shakedown. At the conclusion of that training, she conducted a post shakedown availability at the San Pedro Harbor Boat Co. between 8 and 14 February.

On the 20th, the ship got underway from San Pedro bound for the Admiralty Islands. She arrived at Manus on 15 March but remained only until the 18th, moving via Hollandia in New Guinea to the Philippine Islands. She arrived in Leyte Gulf on 28 March. Over the next eight months, Beaverhead plied the waters of the Philippines, supplying various American bases. Although operating principally in that archipelago, the ship on occasion, voyaged to Borneo, Morotai, and Manus. Ultimately, Beaverhead sailed for home on 5 December. She transited the Panama Canal on 19 January 1946 and arrived in New York 11 days later. She moved to Norfolk, Virginia, during the second week in February and was decommissioned there on 8 March 1946. The ship was turned over to the Maritime Commission for disposal on 13 March 1946, and her name was struck from the Navy list on 28 March 1946. She was subsequently sold in February 1947.

Beaverhead was sold to the Dutch shipping firm of Koninklijke Nederlandsche Stoomboot Maatschappij, N.V., on 28 March 1947, for $693,862, and renamed Hera. In 1963 she was sold to Bahamas Line, Panama, and renamed Omar Express. She was converted in 1967, to a self-unloading cement carrier, at the Avondale Shipyard, in Avondale, Louisiana, and renamed Cementos Ponce. In 1976 she was renamed Vanessa. She was finally scrapped at Veracruz, Mexico, sometime between 1982 and 1984.

== Military awards and honors ==
Beaverheads's crew was eligible for the following medals and campaign ribbons:

- American Campaign Medal
- Asiatic-Pacific Campaign Medal
- World War II Victory Medal

== Bibliography ==
- Mann, Raymond A. (24 June 2015). "Beaverhead". Dictionary of American Naval Fighting Ships. Naval History and Heritage Command.
- "C1 Cargo Ships". ShipbuildingHistory.com. 28 August 2009.
- "USS Beaverhead (AK-161)". NavSource. 29 August 2014.
- "Beaverhead". United States Department of Transportation. Archived from the original on 27 March 2016.
- Swiggum, S.; Kohli, M. (10 June 2006). "Koninklijke Nederlandsche Stoomboot Maatschappij, Amsterdam / Royal Netherlands Steamship Co". TheShipsList.
