= USS Autauga =

Cargo ship of the United States Navy

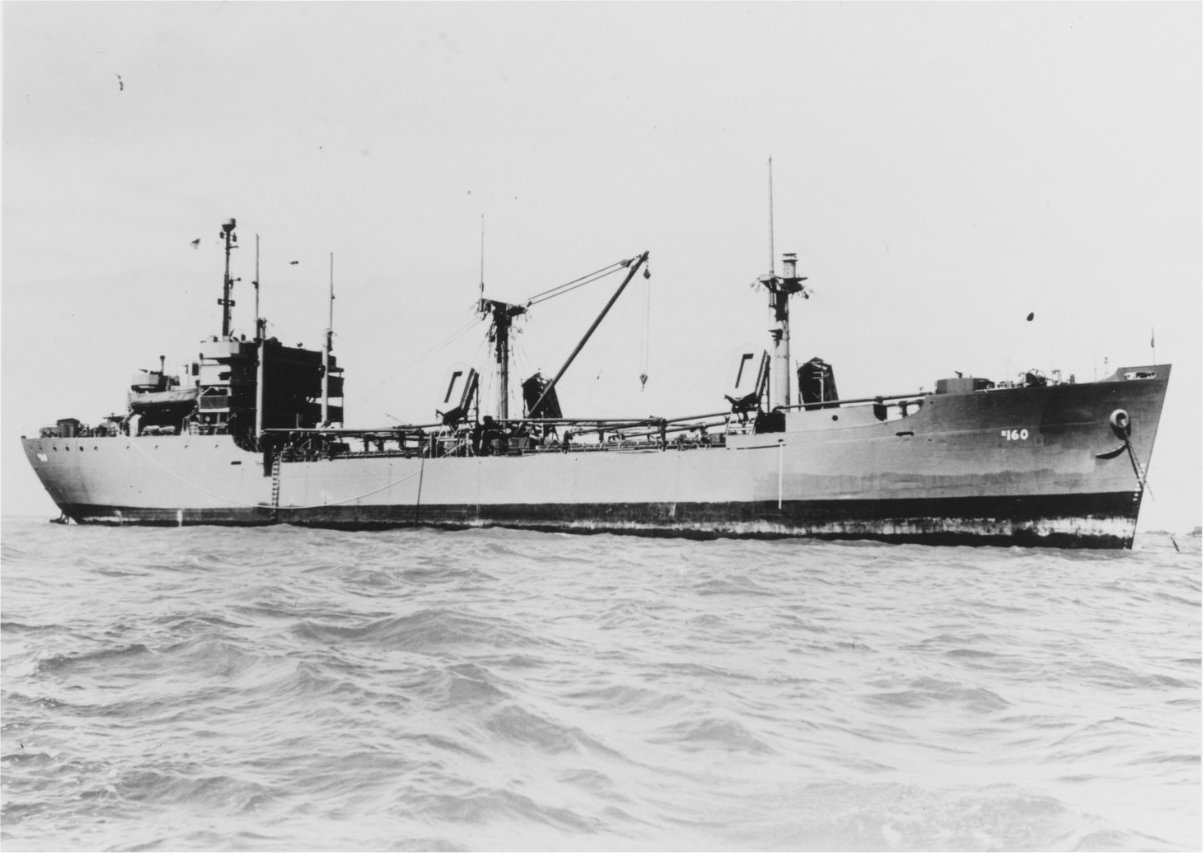
- Autauga underway off San Francisco, late 1945

History

United States
- Name: Autauga
- Namesake: Autauga County, Alabama
- Ordered: as type (C1-M-AV1) hull, MC hull 2105
- Builder: Kaiser Shipbuilding Co., Richmond, California
- Yard number: 62
- Laid down: 10 May 1944
- Launched: 7 August 1944
- Sponsored by: Mrs. Leroy Lloyd
- Acquired: 24 November 1944
- Commissioned: 24 November 1944
- Decommissioned: 24 June 1946
- Stricken: 19 July 1946
- Identification: Hull symbol: AK-160; Code letters: NEFP
- Fate: Sold, 6 April 1948, to Koninklijke Nederlandsche Stoomboot Mattschappij, N.V., Amsterdam

History

Netherlands
- Name: Hersilia
- Owner: Koninklijke Nederlandsche StoombootMattschappij N.V.
- Acquired: 6 April 1948
- Fate: Sold 1963

History

Saudi Arabia
- Name: Fauzia B
- Owner: Saudi Lines
- Acquired: 1963
- Fate: Scrapped 1971

General characteristics
- Class & type: Alamosa-class cargo ship
- Type: C1-M-AV1
- Tonnage: 5,032 long tons deadweight (DWT)
- Displacement: 2,382 long tons (2,420 t) (standard); 7,450 long tons (7,570 t) (full load)
- Length: 388 ft 8 in (118.47 m)
- Beam: 50 ft (15 m)
- Draft: 21 ft 1 in (6.43 m)
- Installed power: 1 × Nordberg, TSM 6 diesel engine; 1,750 shp (1,300 kW)
- Propulsion: 1 × propeller
- Speed: 11.5 kn (21.3 km/h; 13.2 mph)
- Capacity: 3,945 t (3,883 long tons) DWT; 9,830 cu ft (278 m^{3}) (refrigerated); 227,730 cu ft (6,449 m^{3}) (non-refrigerated)
- Complement: 15 Officers; 70 Enlisted
- Armament: 1 × 3 in (76 mm)/50 caliber dual-purpose gun (DP); 6 × 20 mm (0.8 in) Oerlikon anti-aircraft (AA) cannons

USS Autauga (AK-160) was an Alamosa-class cargo ship commissioned by the US Navy for service in World War II. She was responsible for delivering troops, goods and equipment to locations in the war zone.

== Service history ==
Autauga was laid down under a Maritime Commission contract, MC hull 2105, on 10 May 1944 at Richmond, California, by the Kaiser Cargo Co.; launched on 7 August 1944; sponsored by Mrs. Leroy Lloyd; delivered to the Navy at her builder's yard on 24 November 1944; and commissioned the same day. After conversion to a cargo ship at the Navy Dry docks, Terminal Island, California, between 6 December 1944 and 9 January 1945, Autauga conducted her shakedown training out of San Pedro, Los Angeles, from 10 to 22 January before shifting to Port Chicago, California early in February to load cargo. Autauga then departed San Francisco, California, on 16 February and, following a stop in the Marshalls, reached the Carolines one month later. After reporting to Commander, Service Squadron (ServRon) 10, at Ulithi as an ammunition issue and rework ship, she received from bulk carriers and then issued them to ships and craft that ranged from patrol boats to battleships.

Leaving Ulithi in her wake on 9 July, the cargo ship sailed for the Marshalls and reached Eniwetok on the 16th to resume operation as an ammunition issue and rework vessel of Service Division 102. After hostilities with Japan ended in mid-August, she sailed for the United States on 8 November, having serviced almost 400 ships. Autauga reached the Puget Sound Naval Shipyard on the 29th. Although initially earmarked for delivery to the War Shipping Administration (WSA) at Norfolk, Virginia, she was later directed to remain in the 13th Naval District because of the heavy workload at Norfolk. Decommissioned on 24 June 1946, Autauga was delivered to the WSA the next day, and her name was struck from the Navy List on 19 July 1946.

Acquired by the Koninklijke Nederlandsche Stoomboot Mattschappij, N.V. of Amsterdam, Holland, and renamed Hersilia, the former Navy cargo ship operated out of Amsterdam, under the Dutch flag, from 1949 to 1962. Subsequently, bought by the Saudi Arabian concern, the Saudi Lines, and renamed Fauzia B, she served until being scrapped in January 1971 at Hsinkang.

== Bibliography ==
- "Autauga". Dictionary of American Naval Fighting Ships. Naval History and Heritage Command. 19 June 2015.
- "C1 Cargo Ships". ShipbuildingHistory.com. 28 August 2009.
- "USS Autauga (AK-160)". NavSource. 18 July 2014.
- Swiggum, S.; Kohli, M. (10 June 2006). "Koninklijke Nederlandsche Stoomboot Maatschappij, Amsterdam / Royal Netherlands Steamship Co". TheShipsList.
