= HMS Empire Battleaxe =

Ship built in 1943

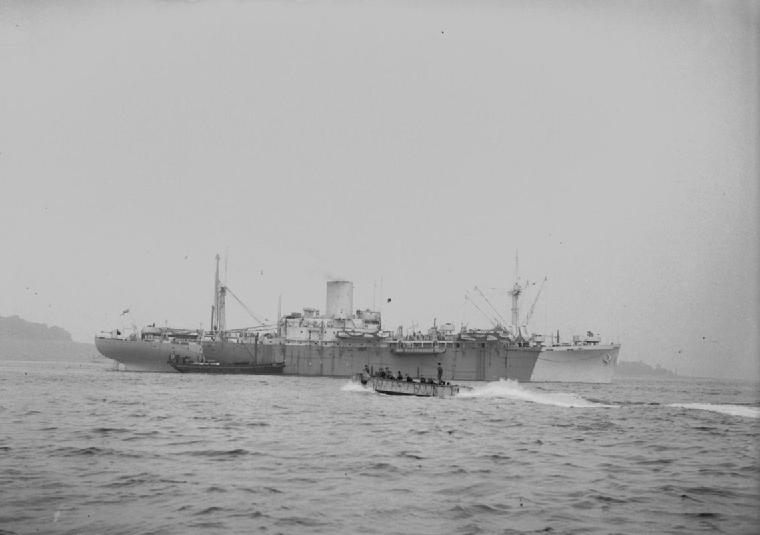

History
- Name: Cape Berkeley (1943); Empire Battleaxe (1943-44); HMS Empire Battleaxe (1944-46); HMS Donovan (1946); Empire Battleaxe (1946-48); Cape Berkeley (1948); Hai C (1948-50); Empire Battleaxe (1950-66)
- Owner: War Shipping Administration (1943-46); United States Maritime Commission (1946-66)
- Operator: Cunard White Star Line (1943-46); Royal Navy (1946)
- Port of registry: (United States) Los Angeles (1943); (United Kingdom) London (1943-44); (United Kingdom) Royal Navy (1944-46); (United Kingdom) London (1946-47); United States (1947-66)
- Builder: Consolidated Steel Corporation, Wilmington, California
- Launched: 12 July 1943
- Completed: October 1943
- Identification: UK Official Number 169016 (1943-44); Pennant Number F161 (1946); UK Official Number 169016 (1946-47); Code Letters KYFJ (1943); Code Letters MYMN (1943-44)
- Fate: Scrapped May 1966

General characteristics
- Tonnage: 6,711 GRT (Cape Berkeley, 1943); 7,177 GRT
- Length: 396 ft 5 in (120.83 m)
- Beam: 60 ft 1 in (18.31 m)
- Depth: 25 ft 6 in (7.77 m) (Cape Berkeley, 1943); 35 ft (10.67 m)
- Propulsion: Two steam turbines (Westinghouse Electrical & Manufacturing Co, Essington, California) double reduction geared driving one propeller.
- Speed: 14 knots (26 km/h)
- Boats & landing craft carried: 18 x Landing Craft Assaults, 1 x Landing Craft Mechanized (Empire Battleaxe, HMS Empire Battleaxe, HMS Donovan)
- Capacity: 1,000 troops (Empire Battleaxe, HMS Empire Battleaxe, HMS Donovan)
- Armament: 1 × 4 in gun; 1 × 12 pdr gun; 12 × 20 mm guns (Empire Battleaxe, HMS Empire Battleaxe, HMS Donovan)

Empire Battleaxe was a British ship of the Second World War and as HMS Donovan in service with the Royal Navy just after the Second World War. Built as a Type C1-S-AY1 Landing Ship, Infantry named Cape Berkeley she then saw merchant service as Empire Battleaxe before being commissioned into the Royal Navy as HMS Empire Battleaxe and then Donovan. After she was decommissioned she returned to merchant service as Empire Battleaxe and was returned to the USA where she was renamed Cape Berkeley once again. A proposed sale in 1948 to China and renaming to Hai C fell through and she was scrapped in 1966.

== Career ==
Cape Berkeley was built by Consolidated Steel Corporation, Wilmington, California as a Type C1-S-AY1 Landing Ship, Infantry. She was launched on 12 July 1943 and completed in October 1943 as Empire Battleaxe. Cape Berkeley was 6,711 GRT but Empire Battleaxe was 7,177 GRT.

Empire Battleaxe was transferred under the terms of lend lease shortly after being completed. She was chartered by the Ministry of War Transport and operated under the management of Cunard White Star Line. She came to the United Kingdom as part of Convoy HX267, which departed New York on 19 November 1943. Empire Battleaxe was carrying a cargo of fish She took part in exercises in the Cromarty Firth and Moray Firth to train troops in preparation for the invasion of France. In May 1944, she took part in an exercise near Littlehampton. She took part in the Normandy Landings carrying part of 537 LCA Flotilla, carrying troops to Sword Beach. The flotilla that Empire Battleaxe was in consisted of four ships, the others being SS Empire Broadsword, SS Empire Cutlass and HMS Glenearn. Empire Battleaxe was close to HNoMS Svenner when that ship was torpedoed and sunk by E-boats. Among those she carried to Normandy was the actor David Niven. After landing her troops, Empire Battleaxe returned to the United Kingdom to collect a second wave of troops. Empire Battleaxe was then commissioned into the Royal Navy as HMS Empire Battleaxe.

In August 1944, HMS Empire Battleaxe was sent to the Pacific as part of Force X. She sailed in a convoy of seven ships comprising SS Clan Lamont, SS Empire Arquebus, HMS Empire Battleaxe, SS Empire Mace, SS Empire Spearhead, and HMS Glenearn. The convoy sailed from Greenock on 3 August via New York and the Panama Canal, arriving at Suva, Fiji, where the convoy dispersed, in late September. HMS Emipire Battleaxe then sailed to Bougainville Island, Papua New Guinea, arriving on 25 October. Australian troops aboard HMS Empire Battleaxe took part in the Bougainville Campaign. She departed Bougainville Island on 14 January 1945 and sailed to Hollandia, Dutch New Guinea, arriving on 2 February. HMS Empire Battleaxe then joined a convoy bound for the Philippines. She was towing a number of LCMs which reduced her speed to 5 knots (9.3 km/h). She arrived at Lingayen Gulf on 18 February where her Landing Craft were involved in the retaking of the Philippines from the Japanese. HMS Empire Battleaxe departed Lingayen Gulf with a consignment of American ex-PoWs, arriving at Sydney, Australia on 19 March. HMS Empire Battleaxe departed Sydney on 11 April 1945, bound for Falmouth where she was to be refitted.

In 1945 she was renamed HMS Donovan, under which name she served out the remainder of the war. After the war ended she was returned to the Ministry of Transport in 1946, her name reverting to Empire Battleaxe. During this time, Empire Battleaxe was employed on trooping duties in the Mediterranean. In July 1946, the crew were told that on arrival at Naples, Italy from Alexandria, Egypt, the ship would sail for Liverpool, United Kingdom. However, on arrival at Naples, orders were received to make another return trip to Alexandria. About three-quarters of her crew refused to sail. The British Consul in Naples visited the ship to warn the strikers of the consequences of their actions. After he had departed, new orders were issued to sail to Liverpool. The explanation given was that the original orders had been issued because it was thought that ships being sent to relieve Empire Battleaxe would not reach Naples in time. Once it was realised that the relief would arrive in time, the order was cancelled.

She was returned to the United States Maritime Commission in 1947 and renamed Cape Berkeley in 1948. It was then proposed to sell her to China, where she was to be named Hai C. The sale was subsequently cancelled. She was renamed Empire Battleaxe in 1950 and laid up in the James River, Virginia. Empire Battleaxe was scrapped at Kearny, New Jersey in May 1966.

== Official Numbers and Code Letters ==
Cape Berkeley used the Code Letters KYFJ in 1943 Empire Battleaxe had the UK Official Number 169703 and used the Code Letters MYMN.
