= USS Tipton =

Alamosa-class cargo ship

History

United States
- Name: Tipton
- Namesake: Tipton County, Indiana, and; Tipton County, Tennessee
- Ordered: as type (C1-M-AV1) hull, MC hull 2169
- Builder: Leathem D. Smith Shipbuilding Company, Sturgeon Bay, Wisconsin
- Yard number: 335
- Laid down: 28 December 1944
- Launched: 13 March 1945
- Sponsored by: Mrs. W. F. Maister
- Acquired: 7 September 1945
- Commissioned: 9 October 1945
- Decommissioned: 4 March 1946
- Stricken: 20 March 1946
- Identification: Hull symbol: AK-215; Code letters: NXQH
- Fate: Transferred to the US Coast Guard on 4 March 1946

United States
- Name: Unalga
- Namesake: Unalga Island
- Commissioned: 4 March 1946
- Decommissioned: 1 June 1950
- Identification: Hull symbol: WAK-185
- Fate: Sold for scrapping, 6 January 1971

General characteristics
- Class & type: Alamosa-class cargo ship
- Type: C1-M-AV1
- Tonnage: 5,032 long tons deadweight (DWT)
- Displacement: 2,382 long tons (2,420 t) (standard); 7,450 long tons (7,570 t) (full load)
- Length: 388 ft 8 in (118.47 m)
- Beam: 50 ft (15 m)
- Draft: 21 ft 1 in (6.43 m)
- Installed power: 1 × Nordberg, TSM 6 diesel engine; 1,750 shp (1,300 kW)
- Propulsion: 1 × propeller
- Speed: 11.5 kn (21.3 km/h; 13.2 mph)
- Capacity: 3,945 t (3,883 long tons) DWT; 9,830 cu ft (278 m^{3}) (refrigerated); 227,730 cu ft (6,449 m^{3}) (non-refrigerated)
- Complement: 15 Officers; 70 Enlisted
- Armament: 1 × 3 in (76 mm)/50 caliber dual purpose gun (DP); 6 × 20 mm (0.8 in) Oerlikon anti-aircraft (AA) cannons

USS Tipton (AK-215) was an Alamosa-class cargo ship that was constructed for the US Navy during the closing period of World War II. She was commissioned; however, the war ended and she was declared "excess to needs." She was then transferred to the US Coast Guard in 1946.

== Construction ==
Tipton was laid down under US Maritime Commission (MARCOM) contract, MC hull 2169, on 28 December 1944, at Sturgeon Bay, Wisconsin, by the Leathem D. Smith Shipbuilding Company; launched on 13 March 1945; sponsored by Mrs. W. F. Maister; transferred to the Navy Department on 7 September 1945; and commissioned on 9 October 1945.

== Service history ==
Upon commissioning, the cargo ship was transferred to the custody of the US Coast Guard for maintenance and operation and was crewed by the Coast Guard.

== Inactivation ==
Tipton was decommissioned and permanently transferred to the Coast Guard on 4 March 1946. She was struck from the Navy list on 20 March 1946.

== US Coast Guard service ==
Tipton was renamed Unalga by the Coast guard. She was one of two MARCOM C1-M-AV1 freighters acquired by the Coast Guard after World War II, along with her sister Kukui, (Note: The USCG site says three ships were obtained but only two can be found in references.) which provided service in the construction of the many LORAN stations planned for operation around the globe.

She was converted for use as a construction supply freighter at the Coast Guard Yard in Curtis Bay, Maryland. After her conversion was complete she was ordered to the Pacific Northwest.

She was stationed at Seattle, Washington and used primarily for the construction of the Alaskan LORAN stations. On 28 November 1948 she rendered assistance to the M/V Kasilof. She was decommissioned on 19 January 1950 and turned back over to MARCOM.

== Merchant service ==
On 1 June 1950, she entered the Reserve Fleet in Olympia, Washington. Marine Power & Equipment Company, Inc. purchased her on 6 January 1971 for $32,200 to be scrapped. However, she was renamed Sea-Alaska and converted to a Fish Factory ship owned by Trident Seafoods Inc. She was scrapped in 2007.

== Notes ==
Citations

== Bibliography ==
Online resources

- "Tipton". Dictionary of American Naval Fighting Ships. Naval History and Heritage Command. This article incorporates text from this source, which is in the public domain.
- "C1 Cargo Ships". www.ShipbuildingHistory.com. 28 August 2009.
- "USS Tipton (AK-215)". NavSource. 24 January 2014.
- "Unalga". United States Department of Transportation. Archived from the original on July 8, 2015.
- "Unalga, 1946" (PDF). US Coast Guard.
