= USS Pontotoc =

Cargo ship of the United States Navy

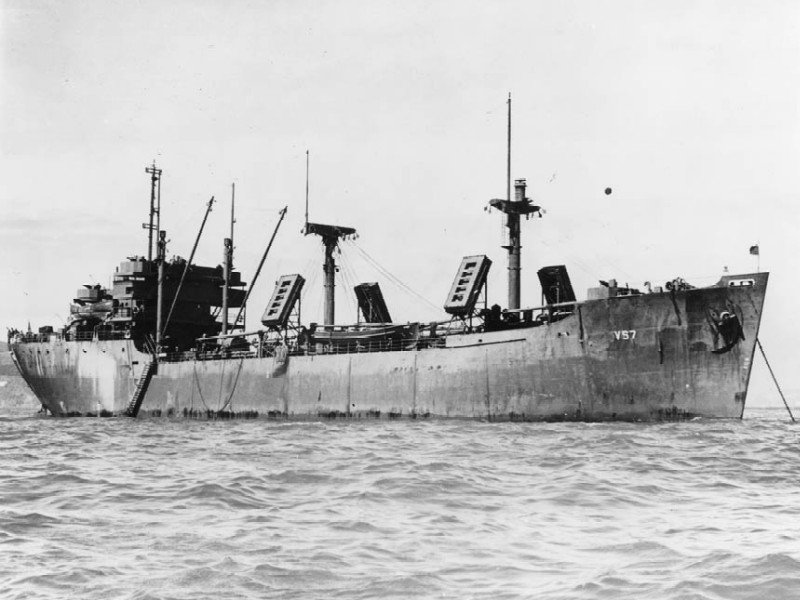
- USS Pontotoc (AVS-7), probably at anchor in San Francisco Bay, California, in 1945

History

United States
- Name: Pontotoc
- Namesake: Pontotoc County in Mississippi and Oklahoma
- Ordered: as type (C1-M-AV1) hull, MC hull 2160
- Awarded: 2 September 1943
- Builder: Leathem D. Smith Shipbuilding Company, Sturgeon Bay, Wisconsin
- Cost: $1,206,823.53
- Yard number: 326
- Laid down: 15 January 1944
- Launched: 2 July 1944
- Completed: 21 October 1944
- Commissioned: 22 March 1945
- Decommissioned: 26 April 1946
- Reclassified: Miscellaneous Auxiliary (AG), 12 March 1945; Aviation Supply Issue Ship (AVS), 25 May 1945
- Refit: Converted to Gwinnett-class Aviation Stores Issue Ship, before 22 March 1945
- Stricken: 8 May 1946
- Identification: Hull symbol: AK-206; Hull symbol: AG-94; Hull symbol: AVS-7; Code letters: NXNN
- Fate: Laid up in Suisun Bay Reserve Fleet, Suisun Bay, California, 26 April 1946, sold to France, 30 June 1947

Republic of France
- Name: Taurus
- Owner: Messageries Maritimes
- Acquired: 14 August 1947
- Fate: Sold to Morocco, 1960

Morocco
- Name: Tadjera
- Acquired: 1960
- Fate: Scrapped, 1968

General characteristics
- Class & type: Alamosa-class cargo ship (1944–1945); Gwinnett-class aviation stores issue ship (1945–1946)
- Type: C1-M-AV1
- Tonnage: 5,032 long tons deadweight (DWT)
- Displacement: 2,382 long tons (2,420 t) (standard); 7,450 long tons (7,570 t) (full load)
- Length: 388 ft 8 in (118.47 m)
- Beam: 50 ft (15 m)
- Draft: 21 ft 1 in (6.43 m)
- Installed power: 1 × Nordberg, TSM 6 diesel engine; 1,750 shp (1,300 kW)
- Propulsion: 1 × propeller
- Speed: 11.5 kn (21.3 km/h; 13.2 mph)
- Capacity: 3,945 t (3,883 long tons) DWT; 9,830 cu ft (278 m^{3}) (refrigerated); 227,730 cu ft (6,449 m^{3}) (non-refrigerated)
- Complement: 9 Officers; 96 Enlisted
- Armament: 1 × 3 in (76 mm)/50 caliber dual purpose gun (DP); 6 × 20 mm (0.8 in) Oerlikon anti-aircraft (AA) cannons

USS Pontotoc (AK-206/AG-94/AVS-7) was originally an Alamosa-class cargo ship acquired by the US Navy shortly before the end of World War II and converted into a Gwinnett-class aviation stores issue ship, to carry aviation parts and spares, and to issue them to the US Pacific Fleet and activities as needed. Pontotoc was named for Pontotoc County, in both Mississippi and Oklahoma.

== Construction ==
Pontotoc was laid down under a Maritime Commission (MARCOM) contract, MC hull 2160, on 15 January 1944, by the Leathem D. Smith Shipbuilding Company, in Sturgeon Bay, Wisconsin. She was classified AK-206, "dry cargo", on 25 February 1944; and launched 2 July 1944. Pontotoc was floated down the Mississippi River in an incomplete state to be finished at Gulf area yards. She was completed 21 October 1944. She was acquired from MARCOM on a loan-charter basis, on 28 February 1945, reclassified AG–94, "miscellaneous auxiliary", on 12 March 1945, and commissioned, 22 March 1945.

== Service history ==
After her shakedown cruise, Pontotoc transited the Panama Canal, and arrived at Pearl Harbor, 18 April 1945. She was reclassified as a Gwinnett-class aviation stores issue ship, AVS-7, effective 25 May 1945. Pontotoc steamed for the Philippines, reporting for duty 8 July, at Guiuan, Samar, and the Philippine Islands. She provided aviation stores on station in the Philippines, through the end of hostilities.

== Decommissioning ==
Pontotoc then proceeded to the 12th Naval District. She decommissioned and was delivered to the War Shipping Administration (WSA), 26 April 1946, at San Francisco, California. She was struck from the Navy List, 8 May 1946, and returned to MARCOM, 26 April 1946, and laid up in the Suisun Bay Reserve Fleet, in Suisun Bay, California.

== Merchant service ==
She was sold 30 June 1947, to the French firm of Messageries Maritimes, and renamed Taurus. She was delivered 14 August 1947. In 1960, she was sold to Morocco, and renamed Tadjera. She was scrapped in 1970.

== Bibliography ==
- "Pontotoc". Dictionary of American Naval Fighting Ships. Naval History and Heritage Command. 24 August 2015. This article incorporates text from this source, which is in the public domain.
- Colton, Tim (28 August 2009). "C1 Cargo Ships". www.ShipbuildingHistory.com.
- Priolo, Gary P. (18 June 2021). "Pontotoc (AG-94/AVS-7)". NavSource.
- "Pontotoc (AK-206/AVS-7)". United States Department of Transportation. Archived from the original on 3 November 2016.
- "Pontotoc".
