= USS Caledonia (AK-167) =

Cargo ship of the United States Navy

History

United States
- Name: Caledonia
- Namesake: Caledonia County, Vermont
- Ordered: as type (C1-M-AV1) hull, MC hull 2112
- Builder: Kaiser Shipbuilding Co., Richmond, California
- Yard number: 69
- Laid down: date unknown
- Launched: 1 January 1945
- Sponsored by: Mrs. V. Brown
- Acquired: 13 March 1945
- Commissioned: 13 March 1945
- Decommissioned: 25 March 1946
- Stricken: 12 April 1946
- Identification: Hull symbol: AK-167; Code letters: NEGP
- Fate: Sold 7 March 1947, to Rederi A / S Hauk (Bucha Goding & Co.), Oslo, Norway

Norway
- Name: Norse Captain
- Owner: Rederi A / S Hauk (Bucha Goding & Co.)
- Acquired: 7 March 1947
- Fate: Sold 1962

Philippines
- Name: Mabini (1962–1964); President Quezon (1964–1965)
- Namesake: Apolinario Mabini; Manuel L. Quezon
- Owner: Philippine President Lines Inc.
- Acquired: 1962
- Fate: Sold to Seven Brothers Shipping Corp., Manila in 1965

Philippines
- Name: Seven Kings
- Namesake: Apolinario Mabini; Manuel L. Quezon
- Owner: Philippine President Lines Inc.
- Acquired: 1965
- Identification: IMO number: 5216240
- Fate: Sold for scrapping to Li Chong Co., Ltd. in September 1980

General characteristics
- Class & type: Alamosa-class cargo ship
- Type: C1-M-AV1
- Tonnage: 5,032 long tons deadweight (DWT)
- Displacement: 2,382 long tons (2,420 t) (standard); 7,450 long tons (7,570 t) (full load)
- Length: 388 ft 8 in (118.47 m)
- Beam: 50 ft (15 m)
- Draft: 21 ft 1 in (6.43 m)
- Installed power: 1 × Nordberg, TSM 6 diesel engine; 1,750 shp (1,300 kW)
- Propulsion: 1 × propeller
- Speed: 11.5 kn (21.3 km/h; 13.2 mph)
- Capacity: 3,945 t (3,883 long tons) DWT; 9,830 cu ft (278 m^{3}) (refrigerated); 227,730 cu ft (6,449 m^{3}) (non-refrigerated)
- Complement: 15 Officers; 70 Enlisted
- Armament: 1 × 3 in (76 mm)/50 caliber dual purpose gun (DP); 6 × 20 mm (0.8 in) Oerlikon anti-aircraft (AA) cannons

USS Caledonia (AK-167) was an Alamosa-class cargo ship commissioned by the U.S. Navy for service in World War II. She was responsible for delivering troops, goods and equipment to locations in the war zone.

== Construction ==
The second ship to be named Caledonia by the US Navy, was launched 1 January 1945 by Kaiser Cargo, Inc., Richmond, California, under a Maritime Commission contract, MC hull 2112; sponsored by Mrs. V. Brown; acquired by the Navy 13 March 1945; commissioned the same day and reported to the U.S. Pacific Fleet.

== Service history ==
=== World War II Pacific Theatre operations ===
Assigned to a role in the Navy's gigantic logistic task of supplying military forces in the Pacific while still carrying out naval, air, and amphibious warfare, Caledonia sailed from San Francisco, California, 1 May 1945, laden with cargo for the base at Manus, where she began discharging 23 May. The cargo ship completed offloading at Samar, Philippine Islands, on 22 June, then steamed to Darwin, Australia, and Milne Bay, New Guinea, to reload supplies essentially needed in the Philippines. After offloading at Samar and Subic Bay in August and September, Caledonia made another voyage to Noumea, New Caledonia, for cargo, returning to Samar, from which she cleared 30 December for Baltimore, Maryland.

=== Post-war decommissioning ===
Caledonia was decommissioned there 25 March 1946, and was returned to the Maritime Commission four days later.

== Merchant service ==
In 1947 Caledonia was sold to Bucha Godager & Co., Oslo, Norway. She was renamed Norse Captain.

In 1962 she was sold to the Philippine President Lines Inc., Manila, the Philippines. She was renamed Mabini in 1962 and then President Quezon in 1964.

In 1965 she was again sold, this time to the Seven Brothers Shipping Corp., Manila. She was again renamed, for the last time, Seven Kings. In 1980 she arrived in September at Kaohsiung, Taiwan for demolition by Li Chong Co. Ltd.

== Notes ==
Citations

== Bibliography ==
Online resources

- "Caledonia". Dictionary of American Naval Fighting Ships. Naval History and Heritage Command. This article incorporates text from this source, which is in the public domain.
- "C1 Cargo Ships". www.ShipbuildingHistory.com. 28 August 2009.
- "USS Caledonia (AK-167)". NavSource. 20 May 2016.
