= USS Gadsden =

Cargo ship of the United States Navy

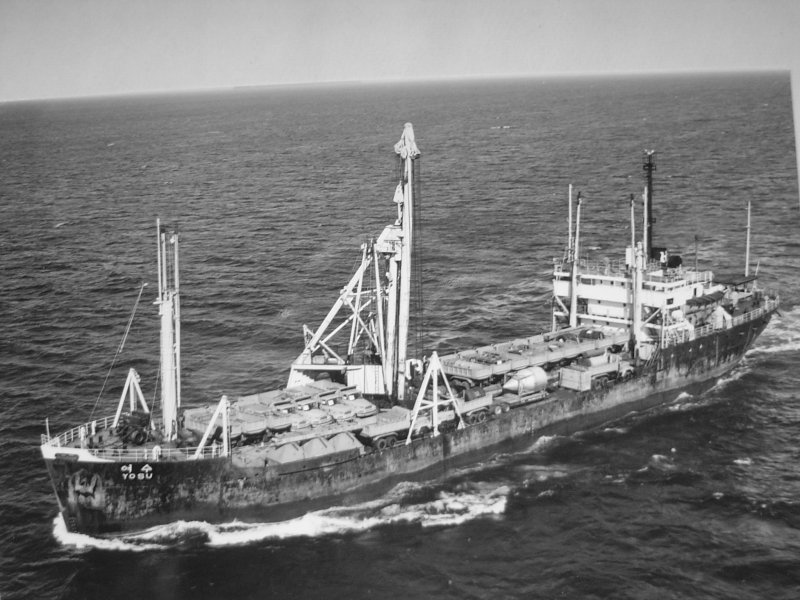
- Yosu underway in the Malacca Strait, circa 1970s.

History

United States
- Name: Gadsden
- Namesake: Gadsden County, Florida
- Ordered: as type (C1-M-AV1) hull, MC hull 2113
- Builder: Walter Butler Shipbuilders, Inc., Superior, Wisconsin
- Yard number: 31
- Laid down: 1943–1944
- Launched: 8 April 1944
- Acquired: 26 December 1944
- Commissioned: 28 February 1945
- Decommissioned: 31 January 1946
- Stricken: 25 February 1946
- Identification: Hull symbol: AK-182; Code letters: NELE
- Fate: Sold, 16 August 1946

United States
- Name: Gadsden
- Owner: American Eastern Corp., New York City
- Acquired: 16 August 1946
- Fate: Repurchased by the Maritime Administration, 23 May 1955; sold, 2 June 1955

South Korea
- Name: Yosu
- Namesake: City of Yeosu
- Owner: Korean Shipping Corp.
- Acquired: 2 June 1955
- Identification: IMO number: 5396399
- Fate: BU Inchon 7 September 1979

General characteristics
- Class & type: Alamosa-class cargo ship
- Type: C1-M-AV1
- Tonnage: 5,010 long tons deadweight (DWT)
- Displacement: 2,382 long tons (2,420 t) (standard); 7,450 long tons (7,570 t) (full load)
- Length: 388 ft 8 in (118.47 m)
- Beam: 50 ft (15 m)
- Draft: 21 ft 1 in (6.43 m)
- Installed power: 1 × Nordberg, TSM 6 diesel engine; 1,750 shp (1,300 kW)
- Propulsion: 1 × propeller
- Speed: 11.5 kn (21.3 km/h; 13.2 mph)
- Capacity: 3,945 t (3,883 long tons) DWT; 9,830 cu ft (278 m^{3}) (refrigerated); 227,730 cu ft (6,449 m^{3}) (non-refrigerated)
- Complement: 15 Officers; 70 Enlisted
- Armament: 1 × 3 in (76 mm)/50 caliber dual purpose gun (DP); 6 × 20 mm (0.8 in) Oerlikon anti-aircraft (AA) cannons

USS Gadsden (AK-182) was an Alamosa-class cargo ship acquired by the U.S. Navy during the final months of World War II. She served the Pacific Ocean theatre of operations for a short period of time before being decommissioned and returned to the U.S. Maritime Administration.

== Construction ==
Gadsden was launched 8 April 1944, under Maritime Commission contract, MC hull 2113, by Walter Butler Shipbuilders, Inc., Superior, Wisconsin; sponsored by Mrs. Morgan Murphy of Superior; acquired by the Navy on loan-charter basis 26 December 1944; and commissioned at New Orleans, Louisiana, 28 February 1945.

== Service history ==
=== World War II service ===
After shakedown in the Gulf of Mexico, Gadsden departed New Orleans 31 March 1945, with a cargo of frozen meat and ammunition for Ulithi, Western Caroline Islands, where she arrived on 11 May after 34 days at sea. From there she proceeded to Kossol Roads, Palau Islands for a 3-day stay marked by alerts for enemy suicide swimmers.

She was convoyed by way of Leyte to Morotai Island, Netherlands East Indies, where she spent 3 months as ammunition ship for units of the U.S. 7th Fleet. At times, she serviced six to eight ships a day as she handled much of the ammunition used by fleet units for the Brunei Bay-Balikpapan invasions of Borneo.

Gadsden arrived at Leyte 31 July 1945, with about one-third of her cargo. She served as ammunition ship there until announcement of the Japanese capitulation. On 21 August 1945, she departed Leyte on a shuttle cargo run to Subic Bay, Philippine Islands, and Hollandia, New Guinea; thence back to Leyte and was routed onward to Manila, Philippine Islands.

=== Post-war decommissioning ===
Gadsden put to sea from Manila 26 November 1945; transited the Panama Canal 8 January 1946; and reached Norfolk, Virginia, on the 19th for inactivation. She decommissioned 31 January 1946 and was redelivered to the Maritime Commission on 1 February 1946 for layup in the Maritime James River fleet.

== Merchant service ==
On 16 August 1946, the Maritime Commission sold Gadsden to American Eastern Corp., of New York, New York, for $693,862. She wasn't reflagged and she retained her name.

The Maritime Administration, which the Maritime Commission had been renamed in 1950, purchased Gadsden back on 23 May 1955, at Seattle, Washington. She was subsequently sold to the Korean Shipping Corp., and renamed Yosu. The ship was scrapped at Inchon on 7 September 1979 by the Han Sung Salvage Co.

== Honors and awards ==
Qualified Gadsden personnel were eligible for the following:

- American Campaign Medal
- Asiatic-Pacific Campaign Medal
- World War II Victory Medal
- Philippines Liberation Medal

== Notes ==
Citations

== Bibliography ==
Online resources

- "Gadsden (AK-182)". Dictionary of American Naval Fighting Ships. Naval History and Heritage Command. 30 October 2016. This article incorporates text from this source, which is in the public domain.
- "C1 Cargo Ships". www.ShipbuildingHistory.com. 28 August 2009.
- "Gadsden (AK-182)". NavSource. 8 November 2013.
- "Gadsden (AK-182)". United States Department of Transportation. Archived from the original on 6 December 2015.
