= USS Fomalhaut =

Cargo ship of the United States Navy

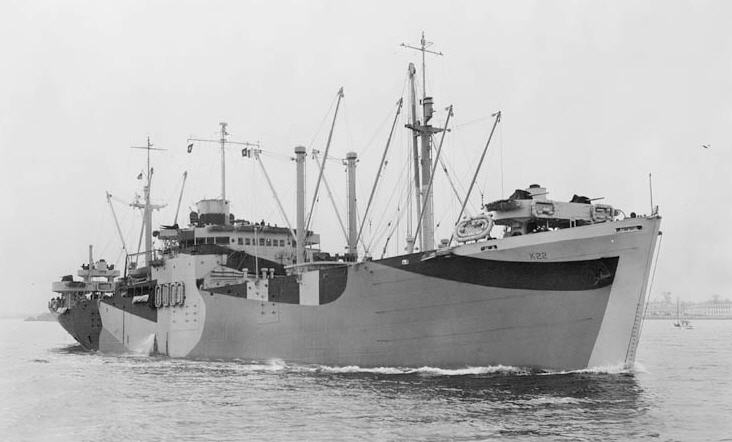
- USS Fomalhaut as AK-22, November, 1942

History

United States
- Name: USS Fomalhaut
- Namesake: Fomalhaut, a star in the constellation Piscis Austrinus
- Launched: 25 January 1941
- Acquired: 16 May 1941
- Commissioned: 2 March 1942
- Decommissioned: 25 June 1946
- Fate: Sold for scrapping, 15 April 1970, to Boston Medals(Metals?), Baltimore, MD.

USS Fomalhaut (AK-22/AKA-5/AE-20) was a Fomalhaut class attack cargo ship named after Fomalhaut, a star in the southern constellation Piscis Austrinus. She served as a commissioned ship for 4 years and 3 months.

The ship was launched 25 January 1941 by Pennsylvania Shipyards, Inc., Beaumont, Tex., as Cape Lookout, a Type C1 ship cargo ship. The launch used 7,000 pounds (3,200 kg) of ripe bananas, which the US Maritime Commission found to be an "efficient substitute" for traditional launching grease, and Cape Lookout was the largest vessel at the time ever to be launched using bananas. It was acquired by the Navy 16 May 1941 and commissioned 2 March 1942. She was reclassified AKA-5 in February 1943, but reclassified AK-22 in August 1944 and reclassified AE-20 in December 1948.

Fomalhaut arrived at Samoa 8 May 1942 with passengers and cargo from the east coast. On 22 June, she sailed for Wellington, New Zealand, to load cargo from 30 June to 22 July, and after exercises in the Fijis, sortied for the initial landings of Marines on Guadalcanal and Tulagi on 7 August. During this first American land offensive of the war, Fomalhaut lay anchored in such a position as to observe the Battle of Savo Island 9 August, and that day sailed for Noumea to load additional men and supplies for Guadalcanal.

Returning to Guadalcanal 23 August, Fomalhaut was ordered to tow the destroyer Blue (DD-387), which had been torpedoed the previous day. But before she could complete unloading and get underway with her tow, an enemy submarine launched a torpedo her way, and Japanese surface forces were reported moving in. As two other destroyers sank Blue to prevent her from possibly falling into enemy hands, Fomalhaut was ordered underway with all but a quarter of her cargo unloaded.

Through one year and a half, Fomalhaut carried out continuous cargo operations in the southwest Pacific, going through some of the hottest fighting of the war supporting the many landings and shore campaigns in the battle for Guadalcanal and the other islands of the southern Solomons. Several times she voyaged to ports in New Zealand or Australia to reload general cargo and stores, and she was often used as a transport. Fomalhaut returned to Pearl Harbor 9 April 1944 to prepare for the invasion of the Marianas, and sailed 1 June to land troops and their equipment on Charan Kanoa Beach, Saipan, 16 June, the day after the initial assault. On 23 June, she got underway for Eniwetok, Pearl Harbor, and New York, where she arrived on 15 August for overhaul.

After tests and training along the Maine coast, Fomalhaut arrived at Norfolk 7 November 1944 for conversion to an underway ammunition replenishment ship, and in her new role she reported for duty at Ulithi 10 January 1945. Aside from the period 19 to 28 February, when she was at San Pedro Bay, Leyte, arming amphibious ships for future operations, Fomalhaut sailed out of Ulithi to deliver ammunition at sea to combatants and their auxiliaries. On 19 March she returned to San Pedro Bay to load ammunition from merchant ships for ships fighting the battle for Okinawa, off which she arrived 11 May. After a voyage to Saipan, where she touched 2 June, Fomalhaut returned to duty in San Pedro Bay from 7 June to 19 September. She returned to Okinawa and lay there until 7 December when she sailed with homeward bound servicemen for Norfolk, arriving 15 January 1946. Fomalhaut was decommissioned and placed in reserve at Philadelphia on 25 June 1946. She was laid up in 1961 and then sold for scrap on 15 April 1970 to Boston Metals, Baltimore, MD.

Fomalhaut received five battle stars for World War II service.

== Bibliography ==
- Wright, Christopher C. (1998). "Question 17/97: Screen of Convoys that Includes USS McCawley, April–May 1942". Warship International. XXXV (3). International Naval Research Organization: 307–313. ISSN 0043-0374.
