= USS Minidoka =

Cargo ship of the United States Navy

History

United States
- Name: Coastal Herald (1944–1945); Minidoka (never commissioned)
- Namesake: Minidoka County, Idaho
- Ordered: as type (C1-M-AV1) hull, MC hull 2127
- Builder: Walter Butler Shipbuilders, Inc., Superior, Wisconsin
- Yard number: 45
- Laid down: 26 August 1944
- Sponsored by: Mrs. R. N. Elder
- Completed: 5 May 1945
- Commissioned: canceled 25 August 1945
- Identification: Hull symbol: AK-196 (never commissioned); Code letters: NEOK
- Fate: returned to the Maritime Commission

United States
- Name: Coastal Herald
- Owner: Maritime Commission
- Operator: Waterman SS Corp. (1945); United Fruit Company (1946–1948)
- Acquired: 4 December 1945
- In service: 4 December 1945
- Out of service: 2 July 1948
- Fate: Sold 13 July 1956

Brazil
- Name: Coastal Herald
- Operator: Companhia Nacional de Navegacao Costerira, Patrimonio Nacional
- Acquired: 13 July 1956
- In service: 3 January 1957
- Fate: Scrapped 1977

General characteristics
- Class & type: Alamosa-class cargo ship
- Type: C1-M-AV1
- Tonnage: 5,032 long tons deadweight (DWT)
- Displacement: 2,382 long tons (2,420 t) (standard); 7,450 long tons (7,570 t) (full load)
- Length: 388 ft 8 in (118.47 m)
- Beam: 50 ft (15 m)
- Draft: 21 ft 1 in (6.43 m)
- Installed power: 1 × Nordberg, TSM 6 diesel engine; 1,750 shp (1,300 kW)
- Propulsion: 1 × propeller
- Speed: 11.5 kn (21.3 km/h; 13.2 mph)
- Capacity: 3,945 t (3,883 long tons) DWT; 9,830 cu ft (278 m^{3}) (refrigerated); 227,730 cu ft (6,449 m^{3}) (non-refrigerated)
- Complement: 15 Officers; 70 Enlisted
- Armament: 1 × 3 in (76 mm)/50-caliber dual-purpose gun (DP); 6 × 20 mm (0.8 in) Oerlikon anti-aircraft (AA) cannons

USS Minidoka (AK-196) was an Alamosa-class cargo ship that was constructed for the US Navy during the closing period of World War II. She was declared excess-to-needs and returned to the US Maritime Commission.

== Construction ==
Minidoka, a C1-M-AV1 type cargo ship, was laid down under Maritime Commission contract, MC hull 2127, by Walter Butler Shipbuilding Co., Inc., Superior, Wisconsin, 26 August 1944; launched 13 January 1945; sponsored by Mrs. R. N. Elder; and completed 5 May 1945. While under conversion for Navy use at the Superior yard of Walter Butler, her conversion was canceled 25 August 1945.

== Merchant service ==
Subsequently, she was returned to the Maritime Commission, renamed Coastal Herald, and operated for the Maritime Commission by Waterman Steamship Corporation and then the United Fruit Company until 1948. She was then sent to the reserve fleet awaiting sale.

On 13 July 1956, she was sold to Companhia Nacional de Navegacao Costerira, Patrimonio Nacional, of Brazil, for $693,682, under the condition that she be used for coastal shipping. She was delivered on 3 January 1957. She was scrapped in 1977.

== Notes ==
Citations

== Bibliography ==
Online resources

- "Minidoka". Dictionary of American Naval Fighting Ships. Naval History and Heritage Command. This article incorporates text from this source, which is in the public domain.
- "C1 Cargo Ships". www.ShipbuildingHistory.com. 28 August 2009.
- "USS Minidoka (AK-196)". NavSource. 24 June 2011.
- "Coastal Herald". United States Department of Transportation. Archived from the original on November 4, 2016.
