= USNS Short Splice =

Cargo ship of the United States Navy

History

United States
- Name: Short Splice
- Namesake: Short splice
- Ordered: as type (C1-M-AV1) hull, MC hull 2464
- Builder: Consolidated Steel Corporation, Wilmington, California
- Yard number: 1310
- Laid down: 15 January 1945
- Launched: 3 March 1945
- Sponsored by: Mrs. A. 0. Wiese
- Commissioned: delivered to the Maritime Commission (MARCOM) prior to commissioning, 18 May 1945
- Identification: Hull symbol: AK-249 (never received number); Code letters: NSLU
- Fate: Transferred to the War Shipping Administration (WSA)

History

United States
- Name: Short Splice
- Owner: WSA
- Operator: US Army
- Acquired: 17 July 1946
- In service: 17 July 1946
- Out of service: 1 March 1950
- Fate: Transferred to the US Navy, 1 March 1950

History

United States
- Name: Short Splice
- Owner: US Navy
- Operator: Military Sea Transportation Service (MSTS)
- Acquired: 1 March 1950
- In service: 1 March 1950
- Out of service: 29 June 1973
- Stricken: 15 June 1973
- Identification: Hull symbol: T-AK-249
- Fate: Transferred to the Maritime Administration (MARAD), 31 August 1973

History

United States
- Name: Short Splice
- Owner: MARAD
- Acquired: 31 August 1973
- Fate: Sold for scrapping, 31 August 1973

General characteristics
- Class & type: Alamosa-class cargo ship
- Type: C1-M-AV1
- Tonnage: 5,032 long tons deadweight (DWT)
- Displacement: 2,382 long tons (2,420 t) (standard); 7,450 long tons (7,570 t) (full load)
- Length: 388 ft 8 in (118.47 m)
- Beam: 50 ft (15 m)
- Draft: 21 ft 1 in (6.43 m)
- Installed power: 1 × Nordberg, TSM 6 diesel engine; 1,750 shp (1,300 kW)
- Propulsion: 1 × propeller
- Speed: 11.5 kn (21.3 km/h; 13.2 mph)
- Capacity: 3,945 t (3,883 long tons) DWT; 9,830 cu ft (278 m^{3}) (refrigerated); 227,730 cu ft (6,449 m^{3}) (non-refrigerated)
- Complement: 15 Officers; 70 Enlisted

USNS Short Splice (T-AK-249) was a US Maritime Administration (MARCOM) C1-M-AV1type coastal cargo ship, originally planned as an Alamosa-class cargo ship. Constructed as Short Splice for MARCOM, completed in August 1945 and placed in operation by the War Shipping Administration during the closing period of World War II. However, the war ended, and she was transferred to the US Army as USAT Short Splice who kept her in service until transferred to the US Navy in 1950.

== Construction ==
Short Splice was laid down under MARCOM contract, MC hull 2464, on 15 January 1945 by Consolidated Steel Corporation, Wilmington, California; launched on 3 March 1945; sponsored by Mrs. A. 0. Wiese; and delivered to the United States Steamship Lines on 18 May 1945.

== US Army service ==
She was acquired and operated by the Army which commissioned her on 17 July 1946, as USAT Short Spice. She was retained by the Army until she was transferred to the US Navy 1 March 1950.

== US Navy service ==
She operated with the Military Sea Transportation Service (MSTS), carrying cargo for military bases. Until 5 March 1959, she called at almost every European port as well as ports along the Atlantic western coast from Goose Bay, Labrador, to the Panama Canal Zone. She then operated from New Orleans, Louisiana, carrying supplies, ammunition, and vehicles to Panama; Key West, Florida; San Juan, Puerto Rico; and Kingston, Jamaica.

On 3 November 1966, Short Splice moved to the Far East, and a crew of Koreans was assigned to man her. She made supply runs to Vietnam, Korea, Japan, and the Philippine Islands. On 30 March 1973, the Korean crew was replaced by American merchant seamen, but her area of operations did not change.

== Final inactivation ==
On 20 June 1973, while at Sasebo, Japan, she was transferred to the Maritime Administration (MARAD) for disposal. Short Splice was sold to Fuji Marden & Co. Ltd., Hong Kong, British Crown Colony, on 31 July 1973 and scrapped.

== Notes ==
Citations

== Bibliography ==
Online resources

- "Short Splice". Dictionary of American Naval Fighting Ships. Naval History and Heritage Command. 9 September 2015. This article incorporates text from this source, which is in the public domain.
- "C1 Cargo Ships". www.ShipbuildingHistory.com. 28 August 2009.
- "USNS Short Splice (AK-249)". NavSource. 7 July 2012.
