= USS Fairfield (AK-178) =

Cargo ship of the United States Navy

History

United States
- Name: Fairfield
- Namesake: Fairfield County, Connecticut, Fairfield County, Ohio, and; Fairfield County, South Carolina
- Ordered: as type (C1-M-AV1) hull, MC hull 2374
- Builder: Kaiser Shipbuilding Co., Richmond, California
- Yard number: 70
- Laid down: 1944
- Launched: 6 February 1945
- Sponsored by: Mrs. Henry W. Creeger
- Acquired: 28 March 1945
- Commissioned: 28 March 1945
- Decommissioned: 11 January 1946
- Stricken: 12 April 1946
- Identification: Hull symbol: AK-178; Code letters: NEKE
- Fate: Wrecked 18 December 1946

General characteristics
- Class & type: Alamosa-class cargo ship
- Type: C1-M-AV1
- Tonnage: 5,032 long tons deadweight (DWT)
- Displacement: 2,382 long tons (2,420 t) (standard); 7,450 long tons (7,570 t) (full load)
- Length: 388 ft 8 in (118.47 m)
- Beam: 50 ft (15 m)
- Draft: 21 ft 1 in (6.43 m)
- Installed power: 1 × Nordberg, TSM 6 diesel engine; 1,750 shp (1,300 kW)
- Propulsion: 1 × propeller
- Speed: 11.5 kn (21.3 km/h; 13.2 mph)
- Capacity: 3,945 t (3,883 long tons) DWT; 9,830 cu ft (278 m^{3}) (refrigerated); 227,730 cu ft (6,449 m^{3}) (non-refrigerated)
- Complement: 15 Officers; 70 Enlisted
- Armament: 1 × 3 in (76 mm)/50 caliber dual purpose gun (DP); 6 × 20 mm (0.8 in) Oerlikon anti-aircraft (AA) cannons

USS Fairfield (AK-178) was an Alamosa-class cargo ship acquired by the U.S. Navy during the final months of World War II. She served in the Pacific Ocean theatre of operations and was decommissioned shortly after war's end.

== Construction ==
The second ship to be so named by the Navy, Fairfield was launched on 6 February 1945, by Kaiser Cargo Inc., Richmond, California, under a Maritime Commission contract, MC hull 2374; sponsored by Mrs. Henry W. Creeger; acquired by the Navy on a loan-charter basis; and commissioned on 28 March 1945.

== Service history ==
=== World War II-related service ===
Fairfield completed shakedown and fitting out before 8 May, when she arrived at San Francisco, California, to load cargo for Manus, Samar and Calicoan Islands. In early July she loaded US Army cargo at Parang, Mindanao, and was en route to Agusan province when on the 14th she picked up six Filipino guerillas from the wreckage of their boat which had been cut in two and sunk by a submarine.

Fairfield continued her cargo operations among the islands of the southwest Pacific Ocean through October 1945 when she was drydocked at Newcastle, Australia, for a brief period before being assigned to carry Australian Army cargo from Sydney, Australia, to Borneo, Tacloban, and Manila, Philippines.

== Post-war decommissioning ==
During December the Navy removed all excess gear and she steamed into Yokosuka, Japan, on the 25th. On 8 January 1946 a Japanese crew came on board for training and on the 11th she was decommissioned and turned over to the War Shipping Administration for disposal.

== US Army service ==
Fairfield was transferred to the US Army on 5 February 1946, and wrecked on 18 December 1946.

== Notes ==
Citations

== Bibliography ==
Online resources

- "Fairfield II (AK-178)". Dictionary of American Naval Fighting Ships. Naval History and Heritage Command. 8 July 2015. This article incorporates text from this source, which is in the public domain.
- "C1 Cargo Ships". www.ShipbuildingHistory.com. 28 August 2009.
- "FAIRFIELD (AK-178)". NavSource. 23 May 2014.
- "FAIRFIELD (AK-178)". United States Department of Transportation. Archived from the original on March 8, 2016.
