= USNS Captain Arlo L. Olson =

American coastal cargo ship

History

United States
- Name: Bell Ringer; Capt. Arlo L. Olson
- Namesake: Arlo L. Olson awarded the Medal of Honor during World War II
- Ordered: as type (C1-M-AV1) hull, MC hull 2478
- Builder: J.A. Jones Construction, Brunswick, Georgia
- Laid down: date unknown, as MV Bell Ringer
- Launched: 8 May 1945
- Completed: 11 August 1945
- In service: 30 August 1946, as USAT Capt. Arlo I. Olson; 1 March 1950, as USNS Capt. Arlo L. Olson (T-AK-245)
- Out of service: 25 October 1956
- Stricken: 22 May 1958
- Identification: Hull symbol:T-AK-245; U.S. Official Number: 247493
- Fate: Scrapped May 1971

General characteristics
- Class & type: C1-M-AV1
- Tonnage: 3,805 GRT
- Displacement: 7,450 tons full load
- Length: 388 ft 8 in (118.5 m)
- Beam: 50 ft (15.2 m)
- Draft: 21 ft 1 in (6.4 m)
- Propulsion: 1 × Nordberg Diesel diesel TSM 6 engine; 1 × shaft
- Speed: 11.5 knots (13.2 mph; 21.3 km/h)
- Armament: none

USNS Capt. Arlo L. Olson (T-AK-245) was a United States Maritime Administration C1-M-AV1 type coastal cargo ship constructed as Bell Ringer for the Administration, completed in August 1945 and placed in operation by the War Shipping Administration under its agent, Waterman Steamship Company, until August 1946. The ship was then transferred to the Army under bareboat charter, The Army renamed the ship Capt. Arlo L. Olson, for Captain Arlo L. Olson who was awarded the Medal of Honor in World War II. The ship was among the Army ships transferred to the Navy in 1950 and then operated by the Military Sea Transportation Service as USNS Capt. Arlo L. Olson with hull number T-AK-245 until 1958.

== Construction and WSA operation ==
Bell Ringer was constructed as MC hull 2478 for the Administration by J.A. Jones Construction, Brunswick, Georgia, completed 11 August 1945 and delivered to the War Shipping Administration for operation by its agent Waterman Steamship Company under a general agency agreement the same day.

== U.S. Army service ==
On 13 August 1946 to the U.S. War Department for operation by the U.S. Army as USAT Capt. Arlo I. Olson under bareboat charter. On 1 March 1950 she was one of the Army ships transferred to the Navy's Military Sea Transportation Service and title was transferred to Navy at that time.

== U.S. Navy service ==
The ship was immediately placed in service as USNS Captain Arlo L. Olson (T-AK-245) serving until she was placed out of service on 25 October 1956. She was stricken from the Navy List on 22 May 1958 and laid up in the National Defense Reserve Fleet, Olympia, Washington until she was sold to American Ship Dismantlers on 4 March 1971, delivered 26 March and subsequently scrapped.

== Honors and awards ==
Qualified vessel personnel were authorized the National Defense Service Medal.

== Bibliography ==
- Maritime Administration. "Bell Ringer". Ship History Database Vessel Status Card. U.S. Department of Transportation, Maritime Administration. Archived from the original on March 4, 2016.
- Naval History And Heritage Command. "Captain Arlo L. Olson". Naval History And Heritage Command.
- NavSource Online. "USNS Capt. Arlo L. Olson (T-AK-245) - ex- USAT Capt. Arlo L. Olson (1946 - 1950)". NavSource.
