= Type C1 ship =

Class of American cargo ships

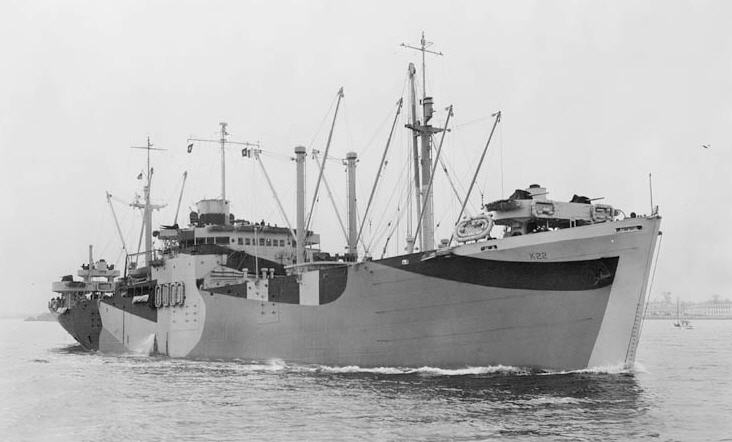
Type C1-A freighter, USS Fomalhaut

Type C1 was a designation for cargo ships built for the United States Maritime Commission before and during World War II. Total production was 493 ships built from 1940 to 1945. The first C1 types were the smallest of the three original Maritime Commission designs, meant for shorter routes where high speed and capacity were less important. Only a handful were delivered prior to the Japanese attack on Pearl Harbor. But many C1-A and C1-B ships were already in the works and were delivered during 1942. Many were converted to military purposes including troop transports during the war.

The Type C1-M ship was a separate design, for a significantly smaller and shallower draft vessel. This design evolved as an answer to the projected needs for military transport and supply of the Pacific Ocean theater of World War II.

Type C1 ships under the control of the British Ministry of War Transport took an Empire name even if built with another name e.g. Cape Turner.

== Origins ==
The United States Maritime Commission (MARCOM) was an agency of the United States government that was created by the Merchant Marine Act of 1936, passed by Congress on 29 June 1936 and replaced the U.S. Shipping Board which had existed since World War I. It was intended to formulate a merchant shipbuilding program to design and build five hundred modern merchant cargo ships to supplement and replace the World War I vintage vessels, including Hog Islander ships, that comprised the bulk of the U.S. Merchant Marine. These old standardized ship designs ranged in size from 5,075dwt to 7,500dwt, 8,800dwt and 9,600dwt for the most common mass-produced types. They either had steam turbines or triple expansion engines, burning oil their boilers. None of the World War I standard designs had diesel engines.

From 1939 through the end of World War II, MARCOM funded and administered the largest and most successful merchant shipbuilding effort in world history, producing thousands of ships, including Liberty ships, Victory ships, and others, notably type C1 ships, type C2 ships, type C3 ships, type C4 ships, T2 tankers, Landing Ship Tank (LST)s and patrol frigates. By the end of the war, U.S. shipyards working under MARCOM contracts had built a total of 5,777 oceangoing merchant and naval ships.

The C series of ships differed from the Liberty and Victory ships. The first C series vessels were designed prior to hostilities and were meant to be commercially viable ships to modernize the US Merchant Marine, and reduce the US reliance on foreign shipping. The Liberty ships were a throwback to late 19th century British designs with reciprocating steam engines, but were very cheap to build in large quantities; Victory ships evolved from the Liberty ships but used modern turbine engines. The C series ships were more expensive to produce, but their economic viability lasted well into the late 1960s and early 1970s in military and merchant fleets. Several ships are still in operation.

== Variations ==
The Type C1-A and C1-B ships were similar in design, All had a rated top speed of 14 knots (26 km/h; 16 mph). The primary difference between them was that C1-A ships were shelter deck ships, while C1-B ships were full scantling ships. The C1-M was the type with the largest production; it was a significant variation from the original C1 design in size, performance and profile; these were shorter, narrower, slower and the superstructure was farther toward the stern.

The C-1 (A and B variants) employed two kind of propulsion systems. One group comprising 19 C1-A, 85 C1-B and all 13 C1-S-AY1 used 4,000 hp compound turbines (one high pressure and one low pressure turbine) and turbo-electric generators for auxiliary power. The other group of 46 C1-A and 10 C1-B used two 2,000 hp diesel engines connected to a single reduction gearset via magnetic couplings, in the same family as the system used on various C3 ships where four such engines were coupled to one gearset for a total of 8,000 hp. The C1-M variant used diesel propulsion exclusively, but only a single 2,000 hp range engine and without magnetic couplings. All turbines and diesel engines were sourced from a variety of manufacturers.

With the exception of ships built for specific shipping lines before the war, the majority of the C1-A and C1-B ships were given two-word names beginning with "Cape", such as SS Cape Hatteras.

=== C1-A ===
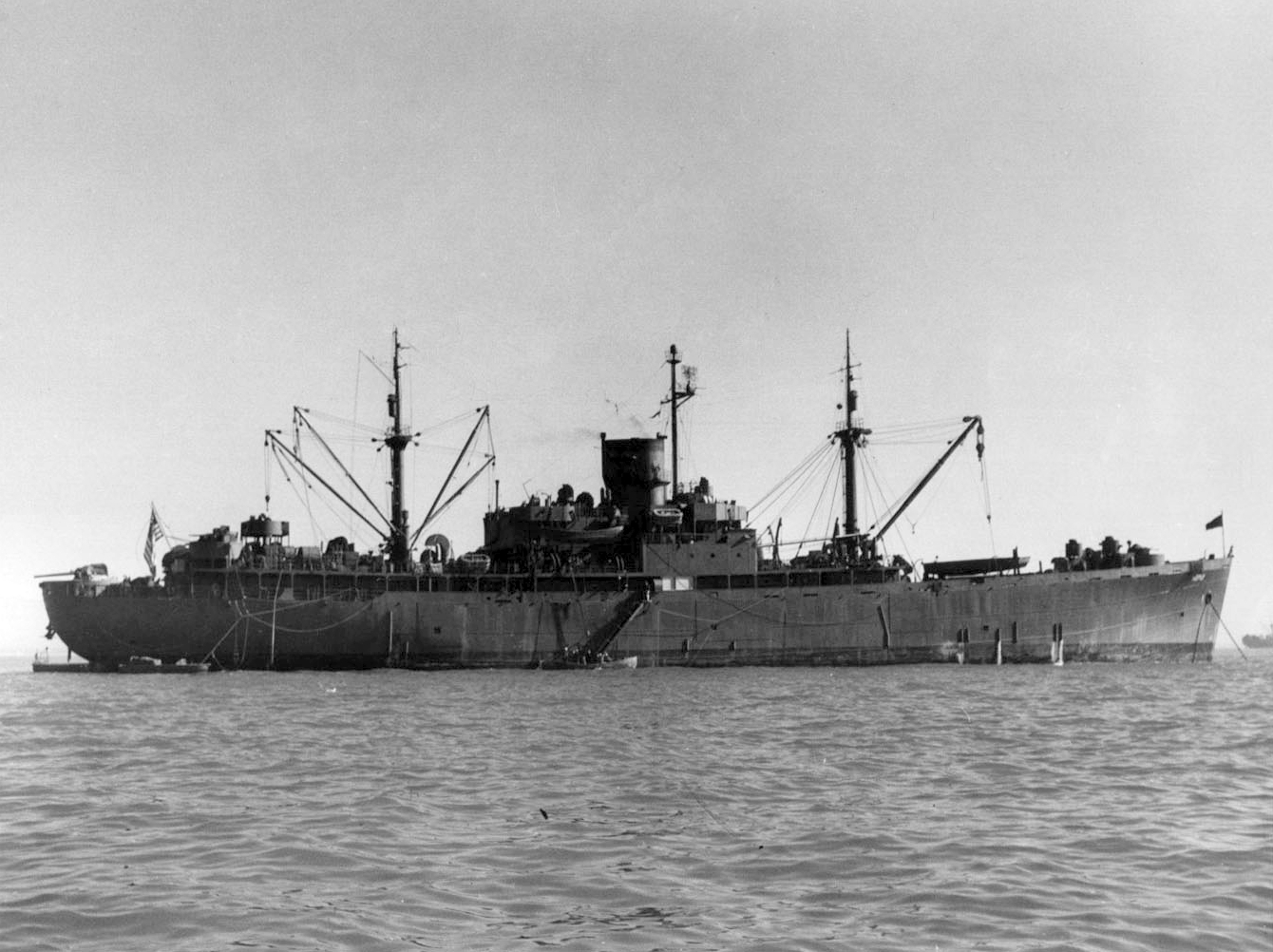
USS Cyrene

Forty-six Type C1-A ships were built at Pennsylvania Shipyards, Inc. in Beaumont, Texas, with another 19 being built by Pusey and Jones in Wilmington, Delaware (not to be confused with Consolidated Steel's Wilmington, California location). The majority were built with diesel motors, though 19 were built with steam turbine engines. These were shelter deck ships, having a very light upper deck, the sides of which are open ports to the second or main deck.

The first keels were laid in 1939. Two of the Pusey and Jones ships were converted to PT boat tenders before entering service, including USS Cyrene.

Some of the diesel vessels were powered by 2, 6-cylinder Nordberg 2-stroke engines (Sulzer type) driving the single shaft via magnetic couplings and a reduction gear-box. They were manufactured by Nordberg Manufacturing Company. The engine speed was 220 rpm and the shaft 110 rpm. This configuration made maneuvering very easy when entering port, as one engine was run in reverse and the other ahead; change of direction was simply performed by energizing the appropriate magnetic coupling. All auxiliary equipment was electric. The engine room was a pleasure to operate and the workmanship outstanding.

- Pennsylvania Shipyards, Inc., TX: 46 (launched May 1941 — Dec 1944)
- Pusey and Jones, DE: 19 (Jan 1942 — May 1945)

Converted to Troop Ships

- SS Cape Bon (MC-301) at Bethlehem Brooklyn 56th Street
- SS Cape Douglas (MC-300) at Cardinal Engineering Company
- SS Adabelle Lykes (MC-141) at Eureka Shipbuilding Company
- SS Cape Henlopen (MC-296) at McNulty Shipyards
- SS Cape Canso (MC-303) at Arthur Tickle

4 Modified and redesignated (to United States Navy)

- Cargo
  - MS Cape Lookout (MC-138) as Fomalhaut (AK-22) then Fomalhaut (AKA-5) then Fomalhaut (AE-20)
  - MS Cape Sable (MC-225) as Sangay (AE-10)
- Motor Torpedo Boat Tender
  - SS Cape Carthage (MC-304) as Acontius (AGP-12)
  - SS Cape Farewell (MC-891) as Cyrene (AGP-13)

=== C1-B ===
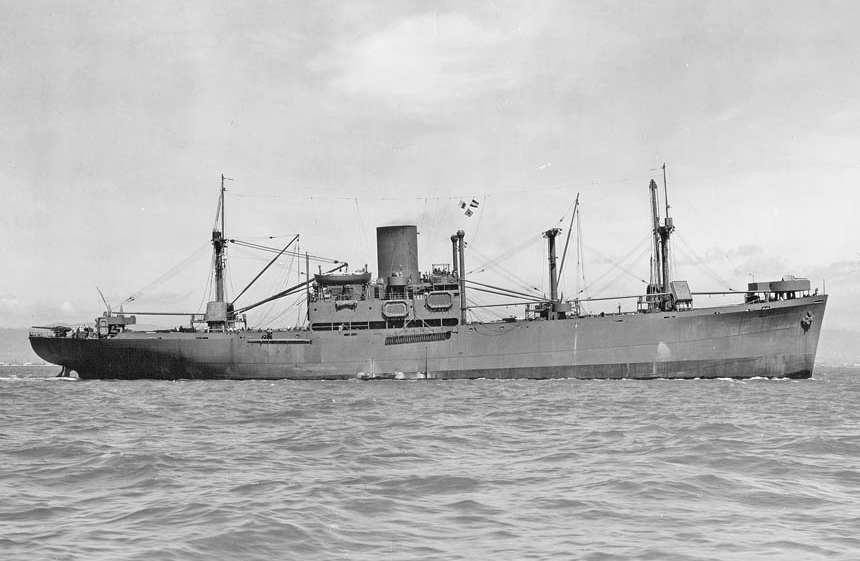
USS Auriga during World War II

The Type C1-B ships were built in eight different yards, all but 15 in West Coast yards, all but 20 in California, the majority at Consolidated Steel Corporation in Wilmington, California. All but ten of the C1-B ships had steam turbine engines; the diesels were all built at Seattle-Tacoma SB Corp., Tacoma, Washington and Western Pipe & Steel, San Francisco, California, with each producing five ships. The C1-B were full scantling ships with three decks in which the frames hold the same dimensions as the upper deck. Full scantling ships have deck gear sufficient to completely unload their cargoes. A C1-B example and perhaps the most well-known was the SS Flying Enterprise.

In 1939, under the Long Range Shipbuilding Program, contracts for 38 ships in batches of 2 to 5 vessels were awarded after one round of competitive bidding. Bethlehem San Francisco and Bethlehem Staten Island only produced on this occasion for the Maritime Commission. For Seattle-Tacoma, the C1-B contract prompted the reopening (and rebuilding) of the Tacoma yard. Consolidated Steel entered the shipbuilding business in 1939. Timing makes these ship constructions interesting, as they were on slipways when the U.S. shipbuilding industry was going through the transition of 1940/1941 towards war time production and many ships, whether afloat or building, were reassigned to fulfill new duties. Unsuccessful bids were made by the General Engineering & Dry Dock Company, the Tampa Shipbuilding and Engineering Company, the Newburgh Shipbuilding and Repair Company of New York, the Sun Shipbuilding and Dry Dock Company, the Los Angeles Shipbuilding and Dry Dock Company. Bids (for either C1-A or C1-B in either steam of diesel variants) were opened on 11 July 1939. Pusey and Jones successfully bid on 2 C1-A ships. Contracts were awarded in September 1939. Two of these early-built ships joined the ship launching parade of the Liberty Fleet Day on 27 September 1941.

External videos
- Launch of the Cape Mendocino

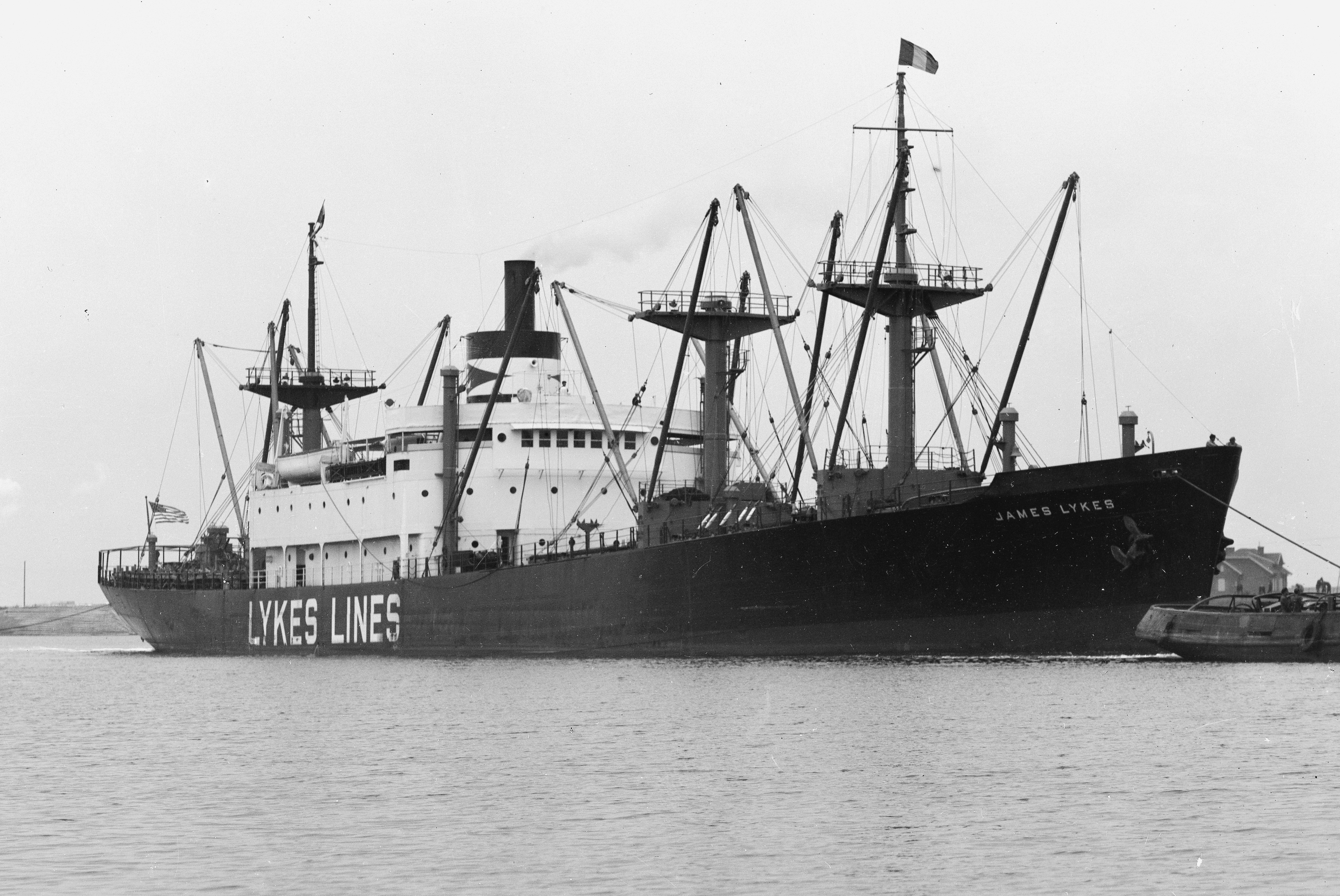
Type C1-B James Lykes in Antwerp

- Federal Shipbuilding, Kearny, NJ: 5
  - Joseph Lykes (MC-67) ... John Lykes (MC-71)
- Consolidated Steel, Long Beach, CA: 4
  - Agwimonte (MC-75) ... Alcoa Polaris (MC-78)
- Bethlehem Sparrows Point, MD: 5
  - James Lykes (MC-79) ... James McKay (MC-83)
- Bethlehem San Francisco, CA: 5 (details)
- Bethlehem Staten Island, NY: 5
  - Alcoa Pathfinder (MC-89) ... Stella Lykes (MC-93)
- Western Pipe & Steel, San Francisco, CA: 5 (diesel)
  - American Manufacturer (MC-94) ... American Packer (MC-98)
- Seattle-Tacoma Shipbuilding, WA: 5 diesel (details)

after the Emergency Shipbuilding Program picked up momentum, Consolidated Steel remained the only manufacturer of the C1-B type.

- Consolidated Steel, Long Beach, CA: 14 (in addition to the original 4)
- Consolidated Steel, Wilmington, CA: 47

Converted to Troop Ships (all steam turbine driven)

- Zoella Lykes (MC-83) at Bethlehem Brooklyn 27th Street, New York
- Agwiprince (MC-76) at Bethlehem Brooklyn 27th Street, New York
- Santa Cruz (MC-84) at Bethlehem Hoboken, New York
- Cape Neddick (MC-91) at Bethlehem Hoboken, New York
- Mormacdove (MC-265) at Todd Hoboken, New York
- John Lykes (MC-71) at Zalud Marine Corporation
- Alcoa Polaris (MC-78) at Zalud Marine Corporation
- Alcoa Patriot (MC-87) at Arthur Blair
- Cape Cod (MC-92) at Arthur Blair
- Cape Perpetua (MC-503) at General Engineering & Drydock Company, Alameda
- Cape Mendocino (MC-505) at Matson Navigation, San Francisco
- Cape Newenham (MC-502) at Moore Dry Dock Company, Oakland
- Cape Meares (MC-510) at United Engineering Co., Alameda
- Cape Cleare (MC-504) at Todd Seattle
- Cape San Juan (MC-509) in San Francisco
- Cape Victory (MC-1025) at Matson Navigation, San Francisco
- Mormachawk (MC-263) completed as troopship by the Consolidated Steel Corporation
- Mormacwren (MC-264)

7 Modified and redesignated (to United States Navy) (all steam turbine driven)

- SS Fred Morris (MC-70) as submarine tender Otus (AS-20) and then as internal combustion engone repair ship Otus (ARG-20)
- Navy troop transports
  - SS Cape Johnson (MC-507) as Cape Johnson (AP-172) at the Los Angeles Shipbuilding and Dry Dock Company, San Pedro
  - SS Fred Morris (MC-490) as Arlington (AP-174) at Todd Hoboken
- Cargo ships
  - SS Alcoa Partner (MC-493) to US Navy as Auriga (AK-98)
- Hospital ships
  - SS Comfort (MC-1021) as Comfort (AH-6) at Bethlehem Shipbuilding San Pedro
  - SS Hope (MC-1015) as USS Hope (AH-7) at the U.S. Naval Dry Dock on Terminal Island
  - SS Mercy (MC-1022) as USS Mercy (AH-8) at the Los Angeles Shipbuilding and Dry Dock Company
  - these ships were originally ordered as uncompleted hospital ships from Consolidated Steel and completed at nearby facilities in the Port of Los Angeles

=== C1-S-AY1 ===
The C1-S-AY1 subtype of thirteen ships built by Consolidated Steel Corporation was modified from the C1-B design for use as troopships by Great Britain under lend-lease called Landing Ship Infantry, Large and they were originally ordered as troopships. These ships were all given two-word names beginning with "Empire", such as SS Empire Spearhead. Empire Broadsword was lost at the Normandy Invasion, to a mine. Empire Javelin was sunk by a torpedo from a German U-boat on 28 December 1944. The original Cape names are what the ships were launched as and by which name they were known to the Maritime Commission.

- Cape Berkeley / HMS Empire Battleaxe / HMS Donovan (F161)
- Cape Compass / HMS Empire Cutlass / HMS Sansovino (F162)
- Cape Gregory / HMS Empire Halberd / HMS Silvio (F160)
- Cape Marshall / HMS Empire Broadsword
- Cape Pine / HMS Empire Lance / HMS Sir Hugo
- Cape St. Roque / HMS Empire Mace / HMS Galteemore (F171)
- Cape Turner / HMS Empire Rapier
- Cape Argos / HMS Empire Anvil / HMS Rocksand (F184)
- Cape Lobos / HMS Empire Javelin
- Cape Girardeau / HMS Empire Spearhead / HMS Ormonde (F172)
- Cape St. Vincent / HMS Empire Arquebus / HMS Cicero (F170)
- Cape Comorin / HMS Empire Gauntlet / HMS Sefton (F123)
- Cape Washington / HMS Empire Crossbow / HMS Sainfoin (F183)

=== C1-S-D1 ===
Twenty-four concrete C1-S-D1 ships were made by McCloskey & Company Shipyard in Hookers Point, Tampa, Florida in 1944. Many were sunk during or after the as war as breakwater barriers.

- Vitruvius Dec-43 Sunk as a breakwater at Normandy
- David O. Saylor Nov-43 Sunk as a breakwater at Normandy
- Arthur Newell Talbot Feb-44 Sunk as a breakwater at Kiptopeke VA
- Richard Lewis Humphrey Mar-44 Sold in Mexico
- Richard Kidder Meade Mar-44 Sunk as a breakwater at Kiptopeke VA
- Willis A. Slater Feb-44 Sunk as a breakwater at Kiptopeke VA
- Leonard Chase Watson Jun-44 Sunk as a breakwater at Kiptopeke VA
- John Smeaton Apr-44 Afloat as a breakwater at Powell River BC
- Joseph Aspdin May-44 Wrecked and lost 1948
- John Grant Jun-44 Sunk as a breakwater at Kiptopeke VA
- M. H. Le Chatelier 1055 Jul-44 Afloat as a breakwater at Powell River BC
- L. J. Vicat Jul-44 Afloat as a breakwater at Powell River BC
- Robert Whitman Lesley 1057 Jul-44 Sunk as a breakwater at Kiptopeke VA
- Edwin Thacher Jul-44 Sunk as a breakwater at Kiptopeke VA
- C. W. Pasley Aug-44 Sunk as a breakwater at Newport OR
- Armand Considere Sep-44 Afloat as a breakwater at Powell River BC
- Francois Hennebique Sep-44 Sunk as a breakwater at Newport OR
- P. M. Anderson Sep-44 Afloat as a breakwater at Powell River BC
- Albert Kahn Oct-44 Abandoned and lost 1947
- Willard A. Pollard Nov-44 Sunk as a breakwater at Kiptopeke VA
- William Foster Cowham Nov-44 Sunk as a breakwater at Kiptopeke VA
- Edwin Clarence Eckel Dec-44 Scuttled 1946
- Thaddeus Merriman Nov-44 Afloat as a breakwater at Powell River BC
- Emile N. Vidal Dec-44 Afloat as a breakwater at Powell River BC

=== C1-M ===
The "Spar Hitch", C1-M-AV1, captained by Carl, E. Peterson, New York, N.Y., in background, was the first big ship to enter Naha Harbor, Okinawa, on 9 August 1945.

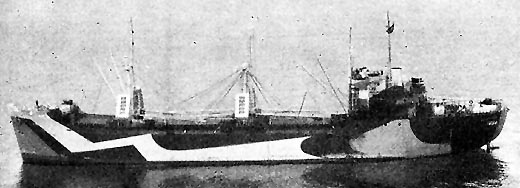
USS Alamosa – typical Type C1-M vessel

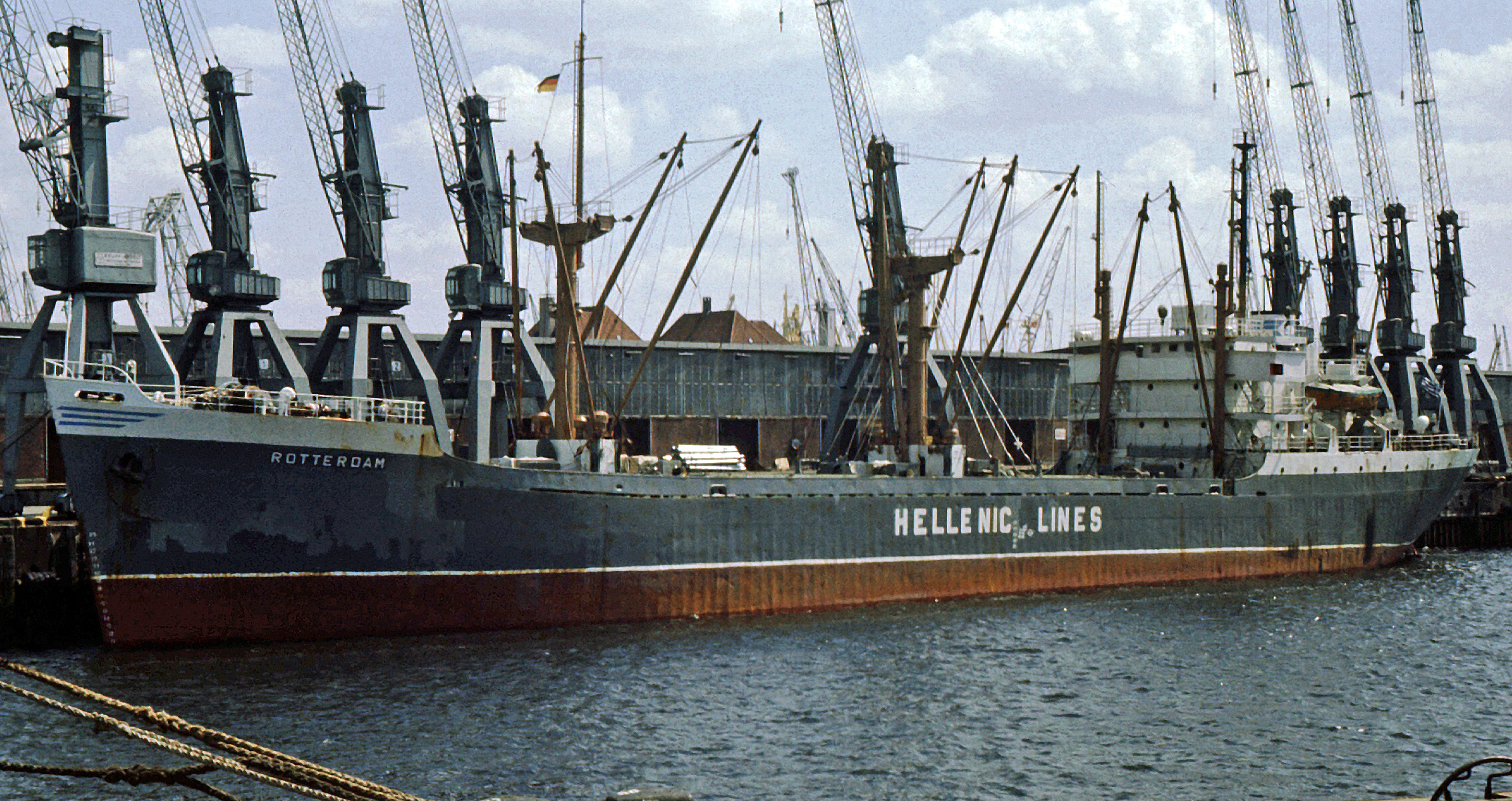
Coastal Captain (type C1-M-AV1) sailed as Rotterdam until 1981

The diesel (M for Motor) powered C1-M Type ships were a separate design from the C1-A and C1-B, meant for shorter runs and shallow harbors, either along the coasts, or for "island hopping" in the Pacific. These ships were shorter, narrower, and had less draft than the earlier C1 designs, and were rated at only 11 knots (20 km/h). USS Alamosa is an example of a C1-M ship.

The C1-M-AV1 subtype, a general cargo ship with one large diesel engine, was the most numerous. About 215 of this type were built in ten different shipyards. Consolidated Steel Corp., Ltd. of Wilmington, California built the largest number – about a quarter of all built. These ships were either named for knots, such as MS Acorn Knot, or with a two-word name beginning with "Coastal", such as MS Coastal Sentry; a large number built for lend-lease were also given two-word names, this time beginning with "Hickory". About 65 of this subtype were complete for the U.S. Navy, like the USS Gadsden built by Walter Butler Shipyard. Those ships were generally named after counties in the U.S. The C1-M-AV1 ships were Alamosa-class cargo ships.

One C1-ME-AV6 (also called C1-M-AV7) subtype was built, MS Coastal Liberator. Instead of the diesel engine direct drive of the AV1 subtypes, it used diesel-electric drive. The diesel engine powered a generator to produce electricity, and an electric motor with 2,200 horsepower (1,600 kW) actually propelled the vessel.

Four of the C1-MT-BU1 subtype were built as lumber carriers, with twin screws. The lumber carriers were given U.S. State-and-tree names, such as MS California Redwood. Built by Albina Engine & Machine Works, Portland, Oregon.

The final subtype, C1-M-AV8, had a variable-pitch propeller. Only one ship was planned as this type, but five previously launched C1-M-AV1 ships were converted to this type for France.

- Launched August 1944 — December 1945
- Consolidated Steel Corporation, CA: 55
- Kaiser Richmond Shipyards, CA: 24
- Pennsylvania Shipyards, Inc., TX: 25 (1 AV8)
- Walter Butler Shipbuilders Inc., WI: 22
- Walter Butler Shipbuilders Inc., MN: 18
- Southeastern Shipbuilding Corporation, GA: 18 (5 AV8)
- Leathem D. Smith Shipbuilding Company, WI: 17 (1 AV6)
- Froemming Brothers, WI: 14
- J.A. Jones Construction, GA: 14
- Globe Shipbuilding Company, WI: 11
- Albina Engine & Machine Works, OR: 4 (4 C1-MT-BU1)

Modified and redesignated

- Cargo - AK (63)
  - 63 Alamosa-class cargo ships
    - (these ships probably were no different than defensively equipped C1-M-AV1 merchant vessels)
    - MC-2101 ... MC-2112 to Alamosa (AK-156) ... Caledonia (AK-167)
    - MC-2141 ... MC-2148 to Charlevoix (AK-168) ... Craighead (AK-175)
    - MC-2374 ... MC-2377 to Fairfield (AK-178) ... Flagler (AK-181)
    - MC-2113 ... MC-2127 to Gadsden (AK-182) ... Minidoka (AK-196)
    - MC-2151 ... MC-2169 to Muscatine (AK-197) ... Tipton (AK-215)
    - MC-2477 to USNS Capt. Arlo L. Olson (T-AK-245)
    - MC-2323 to USNS Colonel William J. O'Brien (T-AK-246)
    - MC-2486 to USNS Pvt. John F. Thorson (T-AK-247)
    - MC-2172 to USNS Sgt. George Peterson (T-AK-248)
    - MC-2464 to USNS Short Splice (T-AK-249)
    - MC-2329 to USNS Pvt. Frank J. Petrarca (T-AK-250)
- Aviation stores issue ships - AVS (3AK)
  - 3 Gwinnett-class
    - AK-185 -> Gwinnett (AVS-5)
    - AK-199 -> Nicollet (AVS-6)
    - AK-206 -> Pontotoc (AVS-7)
- Stores ships - AF (1)
  - USNS Grommet Reefer (T-AF-53)
- Miscellaneous Auxiliary ships - AG (1 + 2APC)
  - T-APC-119 -> USNS Pvt. Jose F. Valdez (T-AG-169)
  - T-APC-118 -> USNS Sgt. Joseph E. Muller (T-AG-171)
  - USNS Sgt. Curtis F. Shoup (T-AG-175)
- Missile Range Instrumentation Ship - AGM (4 + 1AK + 1???)
  - USNS Sword Knot (T-AGM-13)
  - USNS Rose Knot (T-AGM-14)
  - AK-212 -> USNS Coastal Sentry (T-AGM-15)
  - USNS Coastal Crusader (T-AGM-16)
  - USNS Timber Hitch (T-AGM-17) (alamosa?)
  - USNS Sampan Hitch (T-AGM-18)
- Survey ship - AGS (1APC)
  - T-APC-117 -> USNS Sgt. George D. Keathley (T-AGS-35)
- Coastal Transport- APC (4)
  - USNS Sgt. Jonah E. Kelley (T-APC-116)
  - USNS Sgt. George D. Keathley (T-APC-117) -> T-AGS-35
  - USNS Sgt. Joseph E. Muller (T-APC-118) -> T-AG-171
  - USNS Pvt. Jose F. Valdez (T-APC-119) -> T-AG-169

== Final disposition ==
Most of these ships have been sold and scrapped but numerous examples are still in service with Non Governmental Organizations (NGO)s such as "Friend Ships". That organization used the ex "Pembina" built in Superior Wisconsin and renamed the Spirit of Grace until she was removed in 2006 and scrapped in 2008.

== Type C1 specifications ==
Specifications of Type C1 ship subtypes
Ship type	C1-A Shelter deck	C1-B full scantling	C1-M
Length overall	412.25 ft (125.6 m)	417.75 ft (127.3 m)	338.5 ft (103.2 m)
Beam	60 ft (18.3 m)	60 ft (18.3 m)	50 ft (15.2 m)
Depth	37.5 ft (11.4 m)	37.5 ft (11.4 m)	29 ft (8.8 m)
Draft	23.5 ft (7.2 m)	27.5 ft (8.4 m)	18 ft (5.5 m)
Gross tons	5,028	6,750	3,805
Deadweight tons, steam	6,240	7,815	—N/a
Deadweight tons, diesel	6,440	8,015	5,032
Speed	14 knots (26 km/h)	14 knots (26 km/h)	11 knots (20 km/h)
Power	4,000 hp (3,000 kW)	4,000 hp (3,000 kW)	1,750 hp (1.300 kW)

== Quantities of Type C1 ships ==
Number of Type C1 ships built
Type	Quantity	Naming scheme
C1-A	65	"Cape" names, SS Cape Hatteras, SS Cape St Elias
C1-B	95	also "Cape" names, other names, specific shipping lines names include SS Mormacgull (II)
C1-S-AY1	13	took "Empire" names after transfer to the British Ministry of War Transport, several became Landing Ship, Infantry (Large) such as SS Empire Spearhead
C1-S-D1	24	most named after individuals
C1-M-AV1	217	"Knot" ships, MS Emerald Knot "Coastal" ships, MS Coastal Ranger
C1-MT-BU1	4	"Tree" ships, MS California Redwood, by Albina Engine
C1-ME-AV6	1	Only one, MS Coastal Liberator
C1-M-AV8	11	Originally knots

Note any ship in the control of the British Ministry of War Transport took an Empire name even if being built as another name e.g. Cape Turner

== Incidents ==
- Liscomb Lykes a C1-B, was wrecked and lost in New Caledonia in 1943.
- Elmer J. Burr a C1-M-AV1, renamed Crown Reefer was wrecked and scrapped in 1946.
- Cape Constance a C1-B, was hit by kamikaze plane in the Philippines on 4 November 1944 and was repaired. Later she was wrecked and abandoned in 1947.
- Diamond Knot a C1-M-AV1, collided with the Fenn Victory in the Strait of Juan de Fuca and sunk in 1947.
- Cape Kumukaki a C1-B, renamed Flying Enterprise was wrecked in the English Channel in a storm and sank on 10 January 1952.
- Kenneth E. Gruennert a C1-M-AV1, renamed USNS Grommet Reefer was wrecked in grounding near Livorno on 15 December 1952 and then scrapped.
- Sheepshank a C1-M-AV1, was wrecked and sank in 1961.
- Idaho a C1-B, was wrecked and scrapped in 1962.
- Traverse a C1-M-AV1, was wrecked and scrapped in 1962.
- Rolling Hitch a C1-M-AV1, renamed MS Hoegh Aronde sank in 1963. She started leaking off the coast of Morocco at 31.30N 10.45W, steaming from Sassandra to Valencia with a cargo of 3,000 tons of phosphates and 2,000 tons of logs. She sent out a SOS with a message "sinking fast", but of the Norwegian crew of 32, 14 survivors were found in the sea.
- Cape Frio a C1-A, was wrecked and scrapped in 1964.
- Fisherman's Bend a C1-M-AV1, was wrecked and abandoned in 1965.
- Cape Avinoff a C1-A, renamed Tropicana was wrecked and scrapped in 1966.
- Oregon Fir a C1-MT-BU1 wrecked and scrapped in 1967.
- Star Knot a C1-M-AV1, was wrecked and scrapped in 1967.
- Yard Hitch, a C1-M-AV1, built by Froemming Bros. Inc., Milwaukee, Wisconsin which sank in 1967.
- Gwinnett a C1-M-AV1, (USN AK 185) was wrecked and scrapped in 1968.
- Rockdale a C1-M-AV1, (USN AK 208) was wrecked and scrapped in 1969.
- Carrick Bend a C1-M-AV1, was wrecked and scrapped in 1969.
- Hickory Beck a C1-M-AV1, was renamed Coastal Cadet, was wrecked and scrapped in 1969.
- Masthead Knot a C1-M-AV1, caught fire and sank in 1969.
- Bight Knot a C1-M-AV1, was wrecked and scrapped in 1970.
- Coastal Courser a C1-M-AV1, was wrecked and scrapped in 1970.
- Hickory Glen a C1-M-AV1, was wrecked and abandoned in 1970.
- USS Clarion a C1-M-AV1, sold and renamed Livdal or Løvdal, was wrecked and abandoned in 1970.
- Boatswain's Hitch a C1-M-AV1, sank in 1971.
- Hickory Tor C1-M-AV1, renamed Coastal Skipper, sank 1971.
- Mariner's Splice a C1-M-AV1, was wrecked and abandoned in 1971.
- Reeving Eye a C1-M-AV1, sank in 1971.
- Crown Knot a C1-M-AV1, was wrecked and sank in 1974.
- Long Eye a C1-M-AV1, renamed Almagro, sank 1976.

=== Type C1 ships ===
- MV Cape Texas, Type C1-A
- SS Cape Kumukaki/Flying Enterprise
- USS Fomalhaut
- USS Cyrene

== See also ==
- Type C2 ship
- Type C3 ship
- Type C4 ship
- Type R ship
- T1 tanker
- T2 tanker
- T3 tanker
- Liberty ship
- Victory ship
- Hog Islander
- U.S. Merchant Marine Academy
