= USS Auriga =

World War II U. S. Navy cargo ship

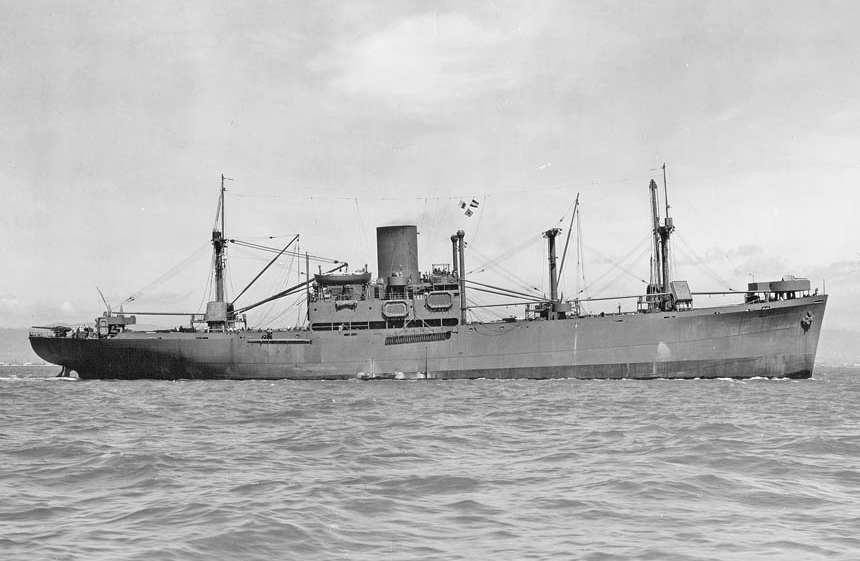
- USS Auriga (AK-98) Photographed during World War II.

History

United States
- Name: Alcoa Partner; Auriga
- Namesake: The constellation Auriga
- Ordered: as Type C1-B hull, MC hull 493
- Awarded: 26 August 1941
- Builder: Consolidated Steel Corp., Wilmington, California
- Cost: $2,354,738.22
- Yard number: 233
- Way number: 4
- Laid down: 9 June 1942
- Launched: 7 September 1942
- Acquired: 16 March 1943
- Commissioned: 1 April 1943
- Decommissioned: 22 January 1946
- Stricken: 7 February 1946
- Identification: Hull symbol: AK-98; Code letters: NKHB
- Honors and awards: 5 × battle stars
- Fate: Scrapped in 1970

General characteristics
- Class & type: Auriga-class cargo ship
- Displacement: 4,023 long tons (4,088 t) (lt); 11,565 long tons (11,751 t) (fl)
- Length: 441 ft 6 in (134.57 m)
- Beam: 56 ft 11 in (17.35 m)
- Draught: 28 ft 4 in (8.64 m)
- Installed power: 1,950 shp (1,450 kW)
- Propulsion: reciprocating steam engine, single shaft
- Speed: 12 kts.
- Complement: 198
- Armament: 1 × 5 in (127 mm) dual-purpose gun mount; 1 × 3 inches (76 mm) dual-purpose gun mount; 2 × 40 mm guns; 6 × 20 mm guns

USS Auriga (AK-98) was an Auriga-class cargo ship, the only ship in her class, commissioned by the U.S. Navy for service in World War II, named after the constellation Auriga. She was responsible for delivering troops, goods and equipment to locations in the war zone.

== Construction ==
Alcoa Partner was laid down under a Maritime Commission contract (MC hull 493) on 9 June 1942, at Wilmington, California, by the Consolidated Steel Corp.; launched on 7 September 1942; sponsored by Dorothea Rasmussen Kunkel; acquired by the Navy on 16 March 1943; converted for naval service as a cargo ship by the Matson Navigation Co.; renamed Auriga on 29 March 1943, and designated AK-98; and placed in commission at San Francisco, California, on 1 April 1943.

== World War II Pacific Theatre operations ==
Upon her commissioning, the cargo ship was assigned to the Naval Transportation Service. When the conversion work had been completed, she got underway on 6 June for Port Hueneme, California, to load cargo and departed the U.S. West Coast on 14 April, bound for the Fiji Islands. The vessel reached Viti Levu, Fiji Islands, on 3 May and began discharging cargo. Unloading was completed on the 28th, and she then reversed her course and proceeded back to the west coast of the United States. Upon her arrival in San Francisco, the ship entered a shipyard for repair work which was completed by early July when Auriga moved to Alameda, California, to load equipment and supplies for transportation to New Caledonia.

=== Serving the South Pacific bases ===
The vessel put out to sea on 19 July and, upon her arrival at Nouméa on 7 August, unloaded her cargo. She completed this task on 21 August and sailed once more for the Fijis. The ship touched at Suva on the 24th; discharged equipment and supplies; and, three days later, began the voyage back to the United States. She arrived at San Francisco on 13 September, reloaded her holds, and moved to San Diego, California. On 1 October she stood out to sea, bound for the Ellice Islands.

Auriga reached Funafuti on the 16th but, the next day, moved on to Wallis Island, Samoa, and remained in port there through 12 November. She then returned to Funafuti, where she carried out cargo operations into January 1944. On the 17th, the vessel got underway for Tarawa, Gilbert Islands, and spent the next week unloading cargo despite frequent enemy bombing attacks. She departed the Gilberts on the 24th and headed for Hawaii.

=== Ship repairs at Pearl Harbor ===
The ship moored at Pearl Harbor on 1 February and unloaded all her cargo before entering the navy yard there for repairs and alterations. On the 22d, Auriga moved to Honolulu for loading operations and got underway on the 29th for Eniwetok. She reached her destination on 11 March and began sending cargo and fresh water to various small craft. The ship took on Army equipment and got underway for Kwajalein on 8 April. The ship anchored off Kwajalein on the 10th and sailed two days later for Hawaii.

=== Saipan invasion operations ===
Shortly after returning to Pearl Harbor, Auriga was slated to take part in the invasion of Saipan in the Marianas. The vessel began taking on Army combat vehicles, ammunition, heavy artillery, and other supplies and embarked troops. On the morning of 1 June, the ship sortied with Task Group (TG) 51.18. After a pause at Kwajalein to refuel, TG 58.18 arrived off Saipan on the 16th; and Auriga began debarking troops and equipment. The next day, the ship retired from Saipan and, during the next eight days, steamed with various task groups while awaiting orders to return to waters off that embattled island.

On 25 June, Auriga touched at Saipan and began unloading operations. Despite enemy air harassment, she completed the process on the 28th and left the area. She anchored at Eniwetok and remained there nearly one month. The ship weighed anchor on the 27th and set a course for Pearl Harbor. After her arrival there on 3 August, the ship entered the navy yard for repairs and alterations.

=== Invasion of the Philippines operations ===
On the 31st, Auriga sailed for Hilo, Hawaii, where she embarked marines, combat equipment, and ammunition. The ship headed back toward Pearl Harbor on 6 September and got underway again on the 15th, bound for Eniwetok. After briefly touching there, the cargo ship was routed on to Manus Island, Admiralties, a staging point for the invasion of the Philippine Islands. She left Manus on 14 October and, six days later, anchored in Leyte Gulf and commenced discharging cargo ashore.

=== Damaged by a Japanese plane attack ===
Still off the beachhead on 25 October, Auriga underwent a Japanese air attack during which her commanding officer and four other crew members were wounded. The next day, she set a course for Peleliu in the Palaus. After a one-day stop there, the vessel proceeded to Hollandia, New Guinea.

=== Delivering cargo at Leyte Gulf ===
Following a brief period in port, Auriga was assigned to a reinforcement group bound for Biak, Schouten Islands. Upon her arrival there, she began loading a cargo of vehicles and Army Air Corps equipment. She got underway on 14 November to return to Leyte. The vessel arrived in Leyte Gulf four days later and began sending her cargo ashore. In spite of heavy enemy air activity, Auriga completed her task on the 19th and left that evening to return to Hollandia.

=== Lingayen Gulf operations ===
The attack cargo ship remained there for a week before being ordered to Aitape, New Guinea, to take on equipment, ammunition, and Army troops. She got underway on 28 December and set a course for the Philippine Islands and the invasion of Luzon. Auriga was assigned to TG 78.5 whose ships reached Lingayen Gulf on 9 January 1945 and began unloading operations shortly after their arrival. Three days later, her holds were empty, and she sailed for Leyte.

=== Luzon invasion operations ===
While at Leyte, the cargo vessel was ordered to begin preparations for another assault on Luzon in the San Felipe-San Narcisco area. Auriga got underway for this operation on 26 January and arrived off the west coast of Luzon on the 29th. The unopposed landing was completed on the 31st, and the ship returned to Leyte where she remained in upkeep into March.

=== Okinawa invasion operations ===
On 13 March, Auriga began taking on cargo, and she got underway on the 27th. She entered Ulithi Lagoon three days later, awaited further orders, and set sail on 7 April for Okinawa. The vessel anchored off Hagushi beach on the 11th and immediately encountered stiff enemy air opposition, but managed to discharge all of her passengers and cargo by the morning of the 17th. Two days later, she left Okinawa and returned to Ulithi.

=== Final wartime operations ===
The ship paused there to refuel and to embark passengers for transportation to the United States. She got underway for home on 25 April, sailed into San Francisco Bay on 12 May, and shortly thereafter entered a shipyard for alterations and repairs. Her repairs and shakedown were completed on 26 June, and she resumed cargo operations. The ship got underway on 8 July, shaped a course for the Marshalls, and during the next month delivered cargo to both Eniwetok and Kwajalein. Auriga was then routed to Espiritu Santo to pick up more cargo.

=== End-of-war activity ===
Upon reaching Espiritu Santo on 15 August, the ship received word of the Japanese capitulation. She loaded supplies and equipment, got underway for Guam on the 23d, and entered Apra Harbor on 1 September. There, she took on cargo to support occupation forces in Japan. After a brief stop at Iwo Jima, Auriga sailed to Japan.

The vessel reached Yokosuka on 12 October and began discharging supplies ashore. She later embarked Army and Navy personnel for transportation back to the United States. The ship left Japan on 27 November and proceeded to Pearl Harbor. She then sailed on to the Panama Canal Zone, transited the canal on 27 December, and continued on to the east coast of the United States. Auriga reached New York City on 3 January 1946; discharged her passengers, cargo, and ammunition; and began preparations for deactivation.

== Post-war decommissioning ==
She was decommissioned at the New York Naval Shipyard on 22 January 1946 and was returned to the Maritime Commission for disposal. Her name was struck from the Navy List on 7 February 1946. She was sold later that year and was refitted for merchant service.

== Military awards and honors ==
Auriga earned five battle stars for her World War II service.

- Gilbert Islands operation
- Marianas operation
- Leyte operation
- Luzon operation
- Okinawa Gunto operation

Her crew was eligible for the following medals:

- Combat Action Ribbon (retroactive - 25 October 1944)
- American Campaign Medal
- Asiatic-Pacific Campaign Medal (5)
- World War II Victory Medal
- Navy Occupation Service Medal (with Asia clasp)
- Philippine Liberation Medal (2)

A number of her crew were awarded "personal awards:"

- Purple Hearts (5-WIA, Leyte, 25 October 1944)
