= USS Arlington (AP-174) =

Cape Johnson-class transport ship

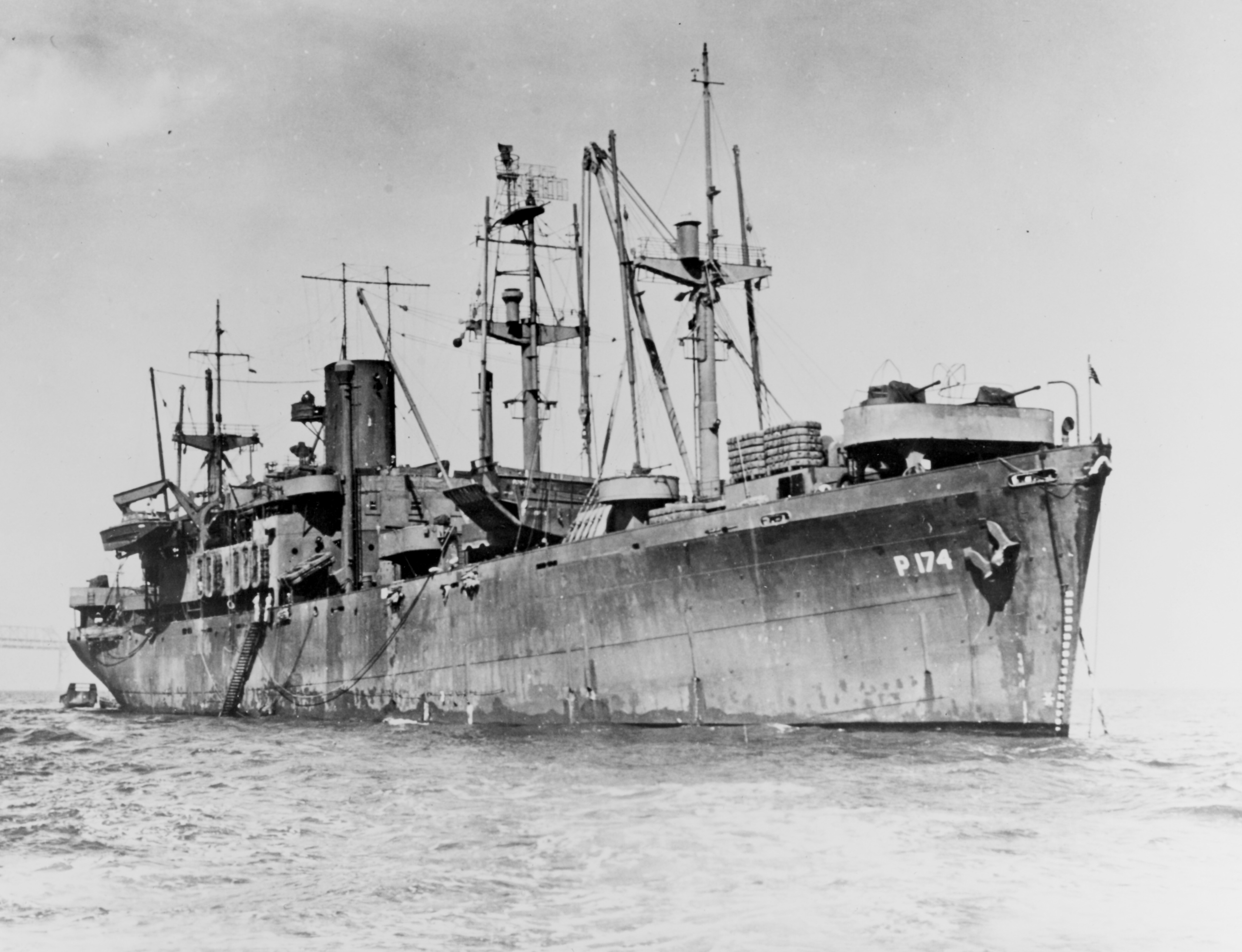
- USS Arlington

History

United States
- Name: Arlington
- Namesake: Arlington
- Owner: Lykes Brothers Steamship Co. (1943); War Shipping Administration (1943–1944); United States Navy (1944–1946); War Shipping Administration (1946); Maritime Commission (1946–1965)
- Builder: Consolidated Steel Corp.
- Laid down: 11 May 1942
- Launched: 10 August 1942
- Sponsored by: Mrs. Clarence J. Coberly
- Acquired: 6 February 1943
- Renamed: Fred Morris (1943–1944); Fred Morris (1946–1965)
- Identification: Callsign: NDTH; Hull number: AP-174
- Honours and awards: See Awards
- Fate: Scrapped, February 1965

General characteristics
- Class & type: Cape Johnson-class transport ship; type C1-B
- Displacement: 5,668 long tons (5,759 t)
- Length: 417 ft 9 in (127.33 m)
- Beam: 60 ft (18 m)
- Draft: 22 ft 3 in (6.78 m)
- Installed power: 1 × propeller; 4,000 hp (2,983 kW); 450 psi (3,103 kPa)
- Propulsion: 1 × Westinghouse steam turbine; 2 × Babcock & Wilcox boilers
- Speed: 14.7 knots (27.2 km/h; 16.9 mph)
- Capacity: 900 DWT; 15,700 cu. ft. refrigerated; 104,414 cu. ft. non-refrigerated; 410 bbls diesel; 10,550 bbls NSFO; 332 TEU
- Troops: 59 officers; 1,396 enlisted
- Complement: 26 officers; 323 enlisted
- Armament: 1 × single 5"/38 caliber gun; 4 × single 3"/50 caliber guns; 4 × single Bofors 40 mm guns

USS Arlington (AP-174), (former SS Fred Morris), was a Type C1-B Cape Johnson-class transport ship built during World War II. The ship is named after a county in Virginia.

== Construction and commissioning ==
The ship was laid down on 11 Many 1942 and launched on 10 August 1942 at the Consolidated Steel Shipyard, Wilmington, California. She was delivered to be used by Lykes Brothers Steamship Company as SS Fred Morris in the same year.

On 13 December 1943, War Shipping Administration (WSA) acquired the ship for conversion at the Todd Shipbuilding & Drydock Company to a Navy transport. Later on 31 January 1944, she was renamed Arlington and re-designated as AP-174. It was not until the United States Navy acquired Arlington at the New York Navy Yard on 17 April and commissioned her on the next day.

On 23 May 1944, she was painted with Measure 32/8T. Following shakedown training in Chesapeake Bay, Arlington loaded cargo and embarked passengers (sailors and marines), and departed Norfolk on 22 May 1944, in company with the USS Eversole (DE-404), bound for Panama. Transiting the Canal Zone on 28–29 May, the transport reached Pearl Harbor on 13 June. Embarking a capacity lift of casualties and troops, the ship set course to return to the west coast on 17 June, arriving at San Francisco on 23 June.

Following a brief availability for work not completed at Hoboken during the initial conversion, Arlington sailed for Seattle on 3 July 1944, arriving there three days later. Assigned duty with the Fleet Operational Training Command, Arlington, the flagship for Capt. Melville E. Eaton, was attached to the Pre-Commissioning Training Center until 18 December. During that time she trained 40 Navy auxiliary ships' complements on board. Each received nine days of intensive instruction afloat in amphibious operations, gunnery, damage control, seamanship, communications, engineering, first aid, handling of casualties, and navigation. Upon termination of that program in Seattle, Arlington headed for San Francisco, where she arrived on 21 December. She served as a training ship at the Pre-Commissioning Center for auxiliary ships at Treasure Island through the end of the war, her last trainee crew leaving the ship on 15 September 1945.

During her second stint as a training ship, Arlington served as the platform for the instruction of 53 additional crews, each receiving from six to 12 days of instruction afloat. They spent the first part of their instruction at anchor; the last two underway at sea. Besides antiaircraft and surface gunnery drills, other evolutions included underway replenishment, streaming and recovering paravanes, correcting magnetic compasses for deviation, ship-handling, and all phases of seamanship, damage control, engineering and handling casualties. All told, the ship trained approximately 25,000 men at Seattle and Treasure Island.

Relieved of instructional duty on 16 September 1945, Arlington was assigned to Service Force Pacific, for duty in Operation Magic Carpet, the return of servicemen to the United States. She sailed on 18 September for Okinawa, Tokyo and Yokosuka, Japan, with 1,400 troops embarked, ultimately returning to Seattle on 14 November for repairs and upkeep. She conducted a second voyage to Japan, proceeding via Adak and Attu in the Aleutian Islands, and touched briefly at Tokyo before returning to Seattle the day after Christmas of 1945. Scheduled to be decommissioned, she headed for New York on 13 February 1946, proceeding via San Diego and the Panama Canal.

Decommissioned at the New York Naval Shipyard on 20 March 1946, Arlington was transferred to the WSA on the same day. Her name was stricken from the Naval Vessel Register on 28 March 1946. Renamed back to SS Fred Morris, the ship remained under Maritime Commission into the 1960s. Laid up around 1950, she remained inactive until scrapped in Baltimore, Maryland, in February 1965.

== Awards ==
- American Campaign Medal
- Asiatic-Pacific Campaign Medal
- World War II Victory Medal
- Navy Occupation Service Medal (with Asia clasp)
