= USS Flagler =

Cargo ship of the United States Navy

History

United States
- Name: Flagler
- Namesake: Flagler County, Florida
- Ordered: as type (C1-M-AV1) hull, MC hull 2377
- Builder: Kaiser Shipbuilding Co., Richmond, California
- Cost: $1,982,464
- Yard number: 73
- Laid down: 1944
- Launched: 24 March 1945
- Sponsored by: Mrs. T. B. Smith
- Commissioned: 18 May 1945
- Decommissioned: 24 December 1945
- Stricken: 7 February 1946
- Identification: Hull symbol: AK-181; Code letters: NEKU
- Fate: Sold, 3 March 1948; Scrapped at Shanghai in 1949

General characteristics
- Class & type: Alamosa-class cargo ship
- Type: C1-M-AV1
- Tonnage: 5,032 long tons deadweight (DWT)
- Displacement: 2,382 long tons (2,420 t) (standard); 7,450 long tons (7,570 t) (full load)
- Length: 388 ft 8 in (118.47 m)
- Beam: 50 ft (15 m)
- Draft: 21 ft 1 in (6.43 m)
- Installed power: 1 × Nordberg, TSM 6 diesel engine; 1,750 shp (1,300 kW)
- Propulsion: 1 × propeller
- Speed: 11.5 kn (21.3 km/h; 13.2 mph)
- Capacity: 3,945 t (3,883 long tons) DWT; 9,830 cu ft (278 m^{3}) (refrigerated); 227,730 cu ft (6,449 m^{3}) (non-refrigerated)
- Complement: 15 Officers; 70 Enlisted
- Armament: 1 × 3 in (76 mm)/50 caliber dual purpose gun (DP); 6 × 20 mm (0.8 in) Oerlikon anti-aircraft (AA) cannons

USS Flagler (AK-181) was an Alamosa-class cargo ship acquired by the U.S. Navy during the final months of World War II. She served the Pacific Ocean theatre of operations for a short period of time before being decommissioned at Okinawa and returned to the U.S. Maritime Administration for dispositioning.

== Construction ==
Flagler was launched 24 March 1945 by Kaiser Cargo Co., Inc., Richmond, California, under a Maritime Commission contract, MC hull 2377; sponsored by Mrs. T. B. Smith; and commissioned 18 May 1945.

== Service history ==
=== World War II-related service ===
Flagler sailed from San Francisco, California, 5 July 1945 with cargo for Ulithi and Leyte Gulf, where she discharged the last of her load 6 August. Here she loaded supplies and men for Okinawa, from which she sailed 29 August for Guam and Saipan.

==== Grounded during a typhoon ====
Okinawa-bound again 12 September, Flagler sailed through a raging typhoon Ursula, which caused some damage to the ship, but arrived safely 18 September. Twice while at Okinawa she put to sea to avoid typhoons, evading the first typhoon Jean. During the second, typhoon Louise, on 9 October, she was grounded. Success in a difficult salvage operation refloated her 26 October.

=== Decommissioning and disposal ===
Flagler was decommissioned at Okinawa 24 December 1945. She was returned to the Maritime Commission 29 March 1946 and laid up at Subic Bay. On 3 March 1948 she was sold for scrap to the Asia Development Corporation, Shanghai, China, along with 14 other vessels, for $271,000.

== Notes ==
Citations

== Bibliography ==
Online resources

- "Flagler (AK-181)". Dictionary of American Naval Fighting Ships. Naval History and Heritage Command. 6 October 2016. This article incorporates text from this source, which is in the public domain.
- "C1 Cargo Ships". www.ShipbuildingHistory.com. 28 August 2009.
- "Flagler (AK-181)". NavSource. 8 November 2013.
- "Flagler (AK-181)". United States Department of Transportation. Archived from the original on November 2, 2016.
