= USS Alamosa =

Cargo ship of the United States Navy

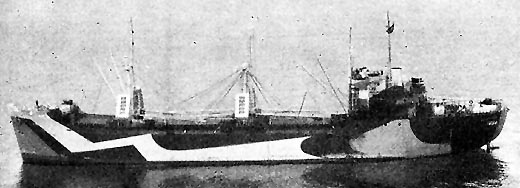
- USS Alamosa (AK-156); her camouflage is Measure 32 Design 6AO.

History

United States
- Name: Alamosa
- Namesake: Alamosa County, Colorado
- Ordered: as type (C1-M-AV1) hull, MC hull 2101
- Builder: Kaiser Shipbuilding Co., Richmond, California
- Yard number: 58
- Laid down: 15 November 1943
- Launched: 14 April 1944
- Commissioned: 10 August 1944
- Decommissioned: 25 August 1944
- Recommissioned: 25 September 1944
- Decommissioned: 20 May 1946
- Refit: 25 August 1944, conversion to an ammunition issue ship
- Stricken: 14 June 1946
- Identification: Hull symbol: AK-156; Code letters: NEFD
- Fate: Sold, 1 May 1972, scrapped August 1972

General characteristics
- Class & type: Alamosa-class cargo ship
- Type: C1-M-AV1
- Tonnage: 5,032 long tons deadweight (DWT)
- Displacement: 2,382 long tons (2,420 t) (standard); 7,450 long tons (7,570 t) (full load)
- Length: 388 ft 8 in (118.47 m)
- Beam: 50 ft (15 m)
- Draft: 21 ft 1 in (6.43 m)
- Installed power: 1 × Nordberg, TSM 6 diesel engine; 1,750 shp (1,300 kW)
- Propulsion: 1 × propeller
- Speed: 11.5 kn (21.3 km/h; 13.2 mph)
- Capacity: 3,945 t (3,883 long tons) DWT; 9,830 cu ft (278 m^{3}) (refrigerated); 227,730 cu ft (6,449 m^{3}) (non-refrigerated)
- Complement: 10 Officers; 69 Enlisted
- Armament: 1 × 3 in (76 mm)/50 caliber dual-purpose gun (DP); 6 × 20 mm (0.8 in) Oerlikon anti-aircraft (AA) cannons

USS Alamosa (AK-156) was the lead ship of the Alamosa-class cargo ships, commissioned by the United States Navy for service in World War II. She was responsible for delivering troops, goods and equipment to locations in the war zone.

== Service history ==
Alamosa was laid down under a United States Maritime Commission contract, MC hull 2101, on 15 November 1943 at Richmond, California, by Kaiser Cargo, Inc.; launched on 14 April 1944; sponsored by Mrs. J.J. Mullane; and acquired by the Navy and commissioned on 10 August 1944. Alamosa class cargo ships are named after United States Counties. After a brief fitting out period in the San Francisco Bay area, Alamosa sailed for Portland, Oregon. There the ship entered the Commercial Iron Works yards and was decommissioned on 25 August for conversion to an ammunition issue ship. She was recommissioned on 25 September and got underway on 6 October for shakedown out of San Pedro, Los Angeles. After taking on ammunition at Mare Island, California, Alamosa set sail on November [...] for the Marshall Islands.

Upon arriving at Eniwetok on 7 December, Alamosa was assigned to Service Squadron 8. For the duration of World War II, the vessel carried ammunition and cargo between Eniwetok, Saipan, Guam, Ulithi, Peleliu, and Leyte. After the end of hostilities, Alamosa entered dry dock at Apra Harbor, Guam, on 1 October 1945. Following the completion of repairs, she got underway again on 7 January 1946, bound for home. She arrived at Seattle, Washington, on 27 January; was decommissioned there on 20 May 1946; and was turned over to the United States Maritime Commission's War Shipping Administration for disposal. Her name was struck from the Navy list on 14 June 1946. The ship was sold for $6,227.22, to American Ship Dismantlers, Inc., on 19 May 1972, for non-transportation use.

== Bibliography ==
- "Alamosa (AK-156)". Dictionary of American Naval Fighting Ships. Naval History and Heritage Command. 9 July 2015.
- "C1 Cargo Ships". ShipbuildingHistory.com. 28 August 2009.
- "USS Alamosa (AK-156)". NavSource. 11 July 2014.
- "Ship Naming in the United States Navy". Naval History and Heritage Command. 26 June 2015. Archived from the original on 3 February 2015.
- "Alamosa". United States Department of Transportation. Archived from the original on 9 April 2016.
