= James Shewan =

Scottish-American businessman

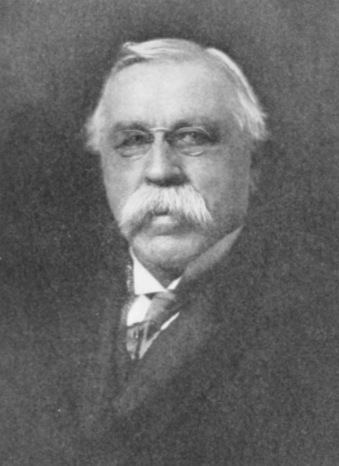
- Born: 6 January 1848; Rora, Aberdeenshire
- Died: 7 May 1914 (aged 66); New York, New York
- Resting place: Woodlawn Cemetery
- Occupation: Businessman
- Spouse: Ellen Curley (m. 1870)
- Children: 5

James Shewan (6 January 1848 – 7 May 1914) was a Scottish-American businessman who made his fortune in real estate in the United States. He was the founder of the largest dry dock and ship repairing facility in the Port of New York.

== Early life ==
Shewan was born on 6 January 1848 in Rora, Aberdeenshire in Scotland. He was the son of Agnes (née Robertson) Shewan (1815–1891) and James Shewan (1819–1854), who died when he was four years old.

== Career ==
After attending school for only a few years, Shewan apprenticed to a ship carpenter. He first traveled to Greenland, where the ship was held by the ice for three and a half months. After his return, he went to London followed by a trip to Singapore with his uncle who was a sea captain. For four years, he traded in tea at various ports in China, Japan, and Australia.

In 1869, he sailed from Yokohama to New York City where he started a dry dock and ship repair business, first called Shewan & Palmer and later known as Shewan & Jenkins. In 1877, Shewan bought out Jenkins and became the sole owner of the business, which he renamed James Shewan & Sons. After his death, his sons ran the business and during World War I, the shipyard had the largest tonnage capacity of any dry docks in America. The company was one of the six New York yards that merged into United Shipyards in 1929. Edwin later sold the business to Bethlehem Steel (where it became "27th St. Works" 40.662901°N 74.00517°W) and retired.

== Personal life ==
In 1870, Shewan married Ellen Curley (1850–1934), a native of Cardiff in Wales. Together, they had three daughters and two sons, including:

- Nellie Shewan (d. 1940), who lived at 1170 Fifth Avenue and did not marry.
- Ada Shewan Galvin Chambers.
- Agnes Shewan (1881–1974), who later became the Marquise Rizzo dei Ritii after her marriage to Marquis don Guglielmo Rizzo dei Ritii in 1928. She owned Shewan's Plumbush estate in Cold Spring, New York.
- James Shewan Jr. (1869–1926), who married Jessica Brown (1886–1935). His daughter, Patricia Carrington Shewan, married Count Jacques de Sibour (nephew of Jules Henri de Sibour).
- Edwin Arthur Shewan (1877–1945)

James owned an estate in the Hudson Valley opposite West Point known as Inverugie (named after a small village in Aberdeenshire, Scotland that lies on the entrance to the River Ugie just north of Peterhead) and the Plumbush estate in Cold Spring.

Shewan died at his home, 43 Fifth Avenue in Manhattan, on 7 May 1914 and was buried at Woodlawn Cemetery in the Bronx. His business passed into the hands of his sons. Upon the death of his widow in 1934, she left her entire estate, valued at several million dollars, to her three daughters and nothing to her son, stating: "they are amply provided for and have such splendid prospects for further bounty that none of them needs and gift, legacy or bequest from me."
