= HMS Cicero (F170) =

Infantry landing ship

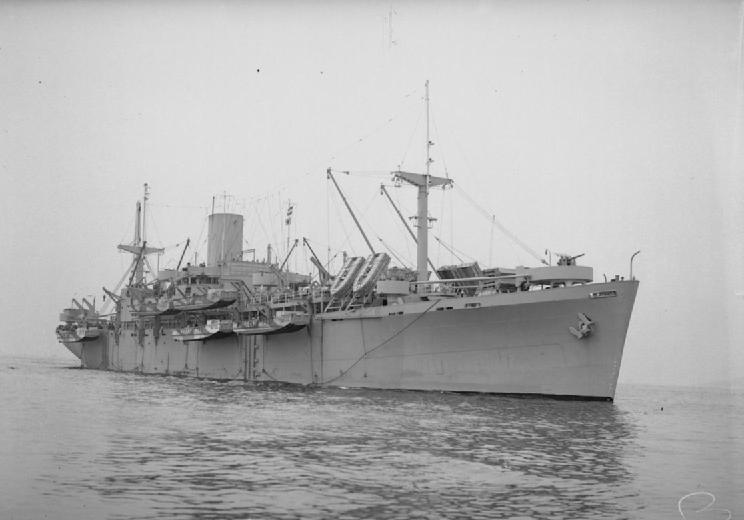

History
- Name: Cape St Vincent (1944); Empire Arquebus (1944–45); HMS Cicero (1945); Empire Arquebus (1945–46); Al Sudan (1946–80)
- Owner: United States Navy (1944); Ministry of War Transport (1944–45); Royal Navy (1945); Ministry of War Transport (1945–46); United States Navy (1945–46); Société Misr de Navigation Maritime, Egypt (1946–59); Egyptian Government (1959–61); United Arab Maritime Company, Egypt (1961–73); Egyptian Maritime Company (1973–80)
- Operator: Owner operated except:-; Donaldson Bros & Black (1944–5, 1945–46)
- Port of registry: (United States) US Navy (1943–44); (United Kingdom) London (1944–45); (United Kingdom) Royal Navy (1945); (United Kingdom) London (1945–46); (United States) US Navy (1946); Egypt (1946–52); Egypt (1952–58); United Arab Republic (1958–71); Egypt (1971–80)
- Builder: Consolidated Steel Corporation, Wilmington, California
- Yard number: 355
- Launched: 16 November 1943
- Completed: January 1944
- Commissioned: January 1945
- Out of service: Returned to Ministry of War Transport in September 1945
- Identification: IMO number: 5007728; UK Official Number 169819 (1944–45, 1945–46); Egyptian Official Number 104 (1946– ); Code Letters MYMS (1944–45, 1945–46); Code Letters SUDS (1946– )
- Fate: Returned to US Navy in 1946; Decommissioned and sold into civilian service in November 1946; Sold for scrapping in 1980; Broken up by 28 March 1987

General characteristics
- Tonnage: 7,177 GRT; 4,823 NRT
- Length: 396 ft 5 in (120.83 m)
- Beam: 60 ft 1 in (18.31 m)
- Depth: 35 ft (10.67 m)
- Propulsion: 2 x Steam turbines (Westinghouse Electrical and Manufacturing Co, Essington, Philadelphia), double reduction geared to 1 screw
- Armament: 1 × 4 in gun; 1 × 12 pdr gun; 12 × 20mm guns

HMS Cicero was an infantry landing ship in service with the Royal Navy during the late stages of the Second World War.

== Career ==
=== Wartime ===
She was built by Consolidated Steel Corporation, Wilmington, California as the Cape St Vincent, and transferred under the terms of lend lease shortly after being completed in January 1944 under the name Empire Arquebus. She was taken over by the Ministry of War Transport and operated by Donaldson Bros & Black Ltd. Empire Arquebus was a member of Convoy CU 15, which sailed from New York on 22 February 1944. She was carrying a cargo of fish and personnel. Empire Arquebus transferred to Convoy HX 280 at sea on 29 February. Convoy HX 280 arrived at Liverpool on 9 March.

She took part in the Normandy landings, carrying Mk3 Landing Craft Support (Medium) 78, 109 and 112 of the 542 Landing Craft Assault Flotilla and troops from the Hampshire Regiment to Gold Beach. After the Normandy Landings, Empire Arquebus was laid up in the Clyde. Empire Arquebus later served in the Pacific.

In January 1945 she was requisitioned by the Admiralty and commissioned as HMS Cicero, under which name she served out the remainder of the war, although it would appear that she remained named as Empire Arquebus. In 1945, Empire Arquebus was used to transport troops from Sydney and Brisbane via New Ireland, New Britain and Manus to Ponam. During this journey, the ship was infested by flying beetles which had got aboard in bales of tobacco. The ship arrived at Ponam on 25 March 1945. Surplus to requirements after the war's end, she was returned to the Ministry of War Transport in September 1945, which returned her to Donaldson Bros & Black under her original name of Empire Arquebus.

=== Postwar ===
Empire Arquebus sailed with Donaldson Bros & Black until 1946, when she was returned to the US Navy. She was laid up until being sold to the Egyptian company Société Misr de Navigation Maritime in November 1946, taking the new name Al Sudan. She sailed with them for the next few years, making voyages carrying pilgrims to Jeddah, and at times operating under charter. She made a number of voyages to Australia.

She was taken over by the Egyptian Government in 1959, during the period of nationalisation, and by 1961 was part of the nationalised United Arab Maritime Company, who proceeded to operate her for the next 12 years. In 1973 she returned to being owned by an Egyptian company, this time the Egyptian Navigation Company. She was sold for scrapping in 1980, and laid up at Suez. She spent several years in this state, but work was finally started in July 1984 and she was completely broken up by 28 March 1987.

== Official Number and code letters ==
Official Numbers were a forerunner to IMO Numbers.

Empire Arquebus had the UK Official Number 169819 and used the Code Letters MYMS. Al Sudan had the Egyptian Official Number 104 and used the Code Letters SUDS.
