= USS Omaha (CL-4) =

Omaha-class light cruiser

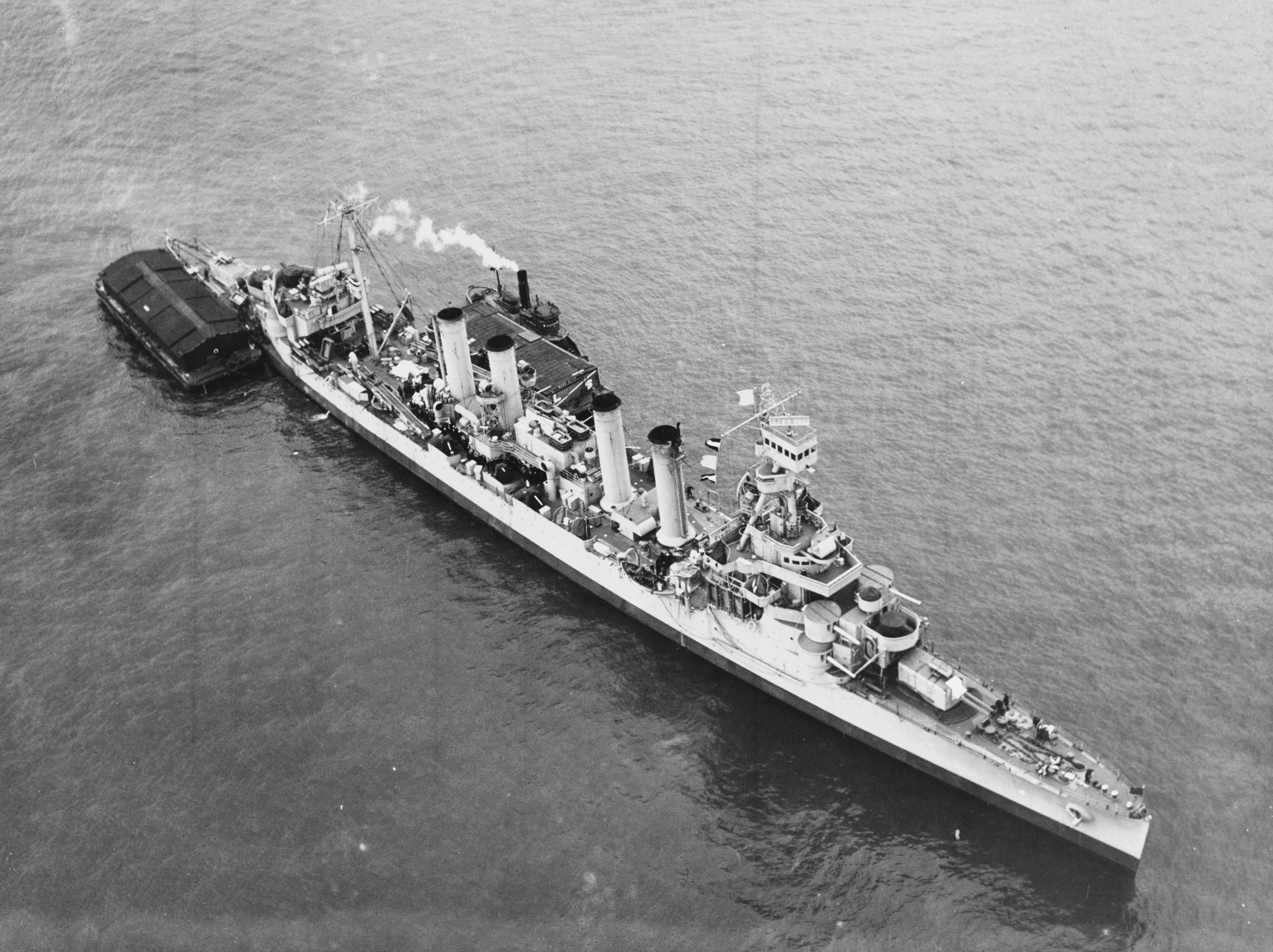
- USS Omaha (CL-4), in New York Harbor, 10 February 1943

History

United States
- Name: Omaha
- Namesake: City of Omaha, Nebraska
- Ordered: 29 August 1916
- Awarded: 26 December 1916; 21 February 1919 (supplementary contract)
- Builder: Todd Dry Dock and Construction Company, Tacoma, Washington
- Cost: $1,541,396 (cost of hull & machinery)
- Laid down: 6 December 1918
- Launched: 14 December 1920
- Completed: 1 August 1921
- Commissioned: 24 February 1923
- Decommissioned: 1 November 1945
- Stricken: 28 November 1945
- Identification: Hull symbol: CL-4; Callsign: NISL
- Honors and awards: 1 × battle star
- Fate: Scrapped, February 1946

General characteristics (as built)
- Class & type: Omaha-class light cruiser
- Displacement: 7,500 long tons (7,620 t) (standard); 9,507 long tons (9,660 t) (full load)
- Length: 555 ft 6 in (169.32 m) oa; 550 ft (170 m) pp
- Beam: 55 ft (17 m)
- Draft: 14 ft 3 in (4.34 m) (mean)
- Installed power: 12 × Yarrow boilers; 90,000 ihp (67,000 kW) (Estimated power produced on trials)
- Propulsion: 4 × Westinghouse reduction geared steam turbines; 4 × screws
- Speed: 35 kn (65 km/h; 40 mph); 33.7 kn (62.4 km/h; 38.8 mph) (Estimated speed on trials)
- Crew: 29 officers 429 enlisted (peacetime)
- Armament: 2 × twin 6 in (152 mm)/53 caliber guns; 8 × single 6 in/53 caliber guns; 2 × 3 in (76 mm)/50 caliber anti-aircraft guns; 2 × triple 21 in (533 mm) torpedo tubes; 2 × twin 21 in torpedo tubes; 224 × mines
- Armor: Belt: 3 in (76 mm); Deck: 1 1/2 in (38 mm); Conning Tower: 1 1/2 in; Bulkheads: 1 1/2-3 in
- Aircraft carried: 2 × floatplanes
- Aviation facilities: 2 × Midships catapults; crane

General characteristics (1945)
- Armament: 2 × twin 6 in/53 caliber guns; 6 × single 6 in/53 caliber guns; 8 × 3 in/50 caliber anti-aircraft guns; 2 × triple 21 in torpedo tubes; 3 × twin 40 mm (1.57 in) Bofors guns; 14 × single 20 mm (0.79 in) Oerlikon cannons

USS Omaha (CL-4) was the lead ship of the Omaha-class light cruiser of the United States Navy. She was originally classified as a scout cruiser. She was the second US Navy ship named for the city of Omaha, Nebraska, the first being Omaha, a screw sloop launched in 1869.

Omaha spent most of her career in the Pacific. At this time her primary mission was training, and she proved to be very capable by consistently winning fleet awards in gunnery and communications. She made many ports-of-call throughout the Pacific, Mediterranean and Caribbean during her peacetime cruises, displaying the Stars and Stripes. In 1941, prior to the US entering the war, she was assigned to Neutrality Patrol in the Atlantic, based in Recife, Brazil. Nearly a month before the US entered the war she captured the German blockade runner SS Odenwald, for which her crew won an award in salvage from a federal court sitting as a court of admiralty.

After the US entered the war she continued her activities of guarding convoys in the Atlantic between South America and Western Africa. During this time she sank two German blockade runners and was responsible for rescuing many crewmen whose ships had been sunk by Axis submarines and merchant raiders. In 1944, she sailed for the Mediterranean to support Operation Dragoon, the invasion of the south of France. After the war she was quickly deemed surplus and scrapped at the Philadelphia Naval Shipyard in February 1946.

== Construction and design ==
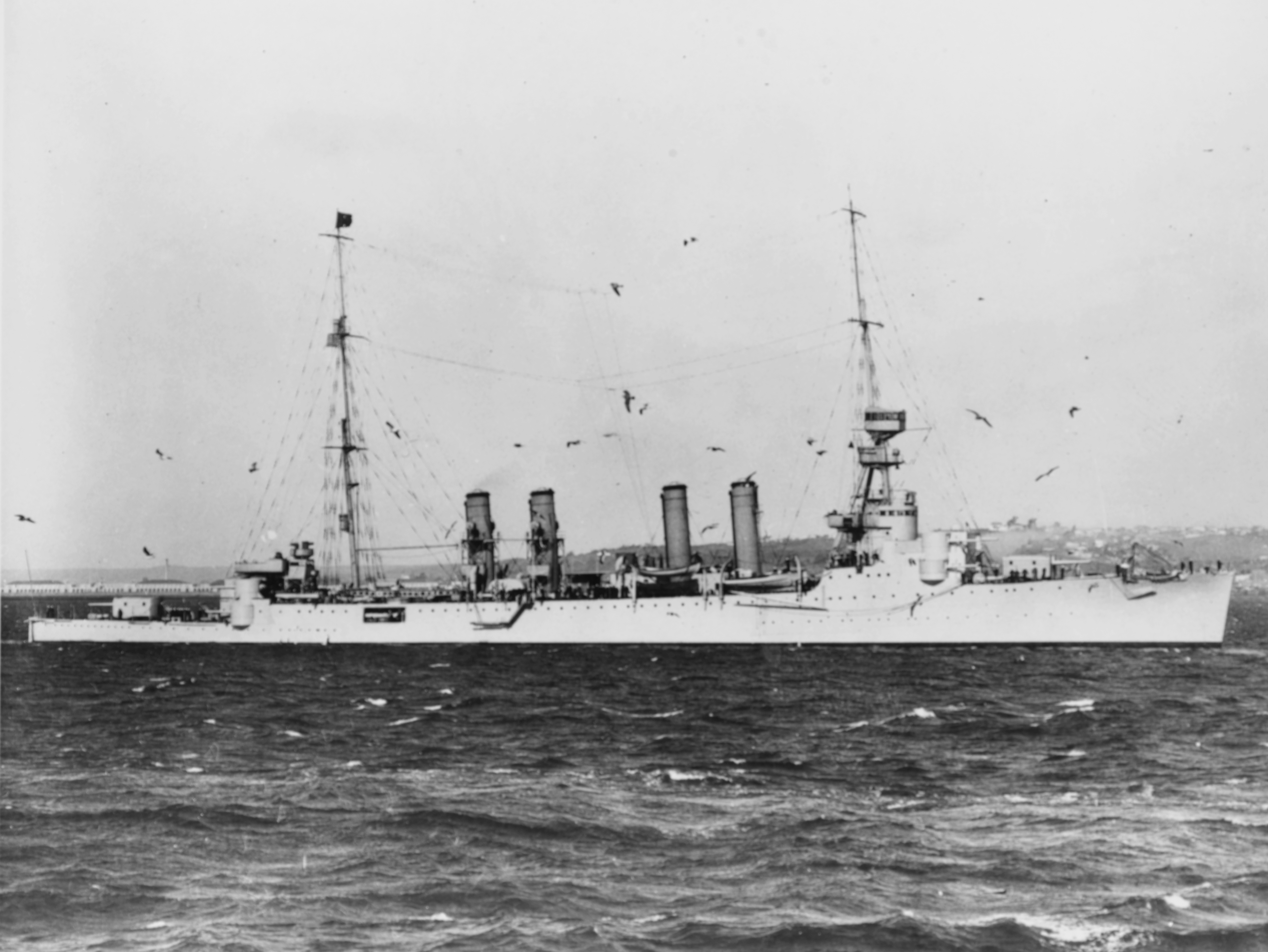
Omaha in harbor, 8 December 1923, her lower twin torpedo tubes visible and her aircraft catapults installed.

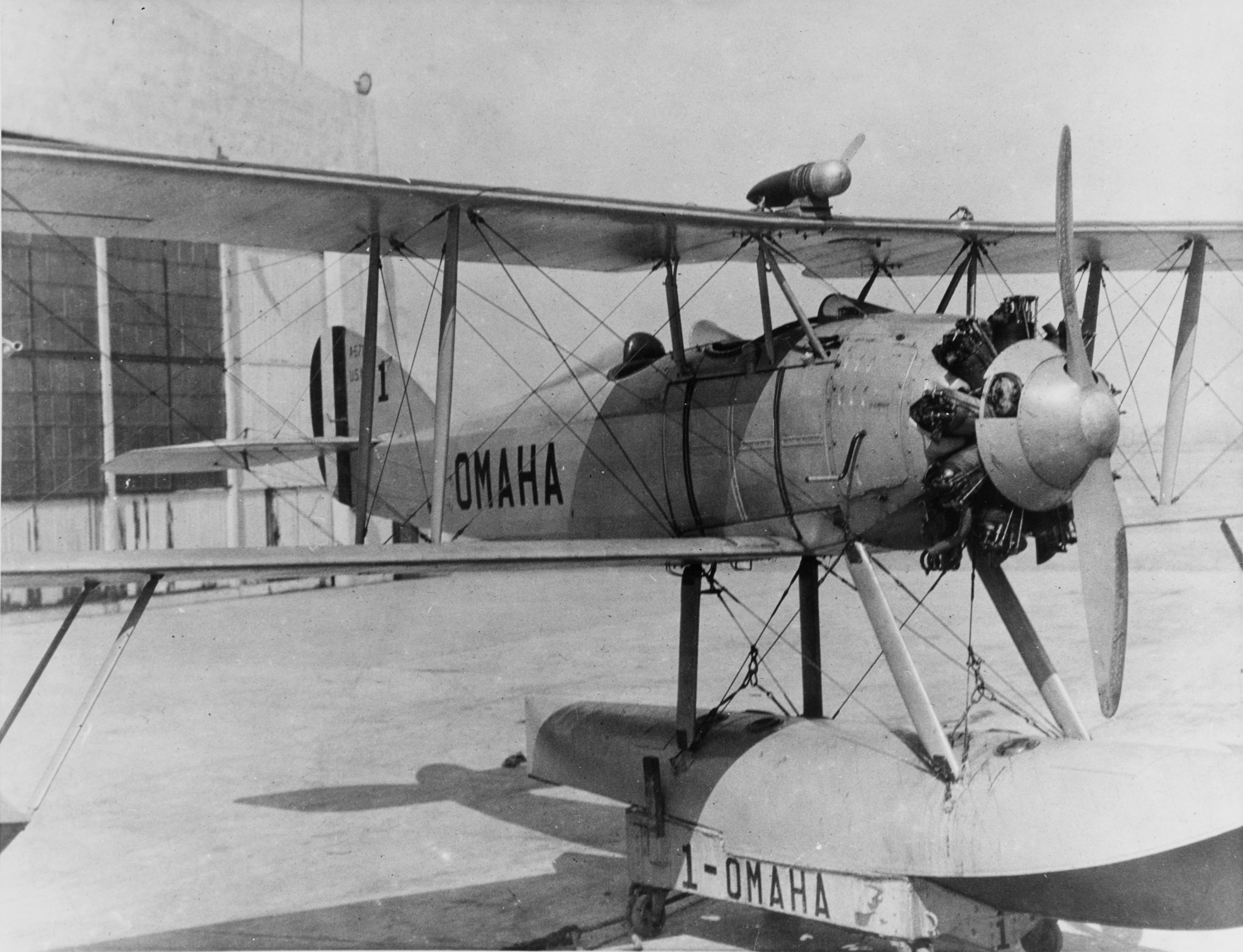
Omaha's #1 Vought UO-1

Omaha's keel was laid down by the Todd Dry Dock and Construction Company of Tacoma, Washington, on 6 December 1918. She was launched on 14 December 1920. Omaha was sponsored by Louise Bushnell White, a descendant of David Bushnell, the inventor of the first documented submarine to be used in combat, Turtle. She was commissioned on 24 February 1923, with Captain David C. Hanrahan in command.

Omaha was 550 feet (170 meters) long at the waterline with an overall length of 555 ft 6 in (169.32 m), her beam was 55 ft 4 in (16.87 m) and a mean draft of 14 ft 3 in (4.34 m). Her standard displacement was 7,050 long tons (7,163 t) and 9,508 long tons (9,661 t) at full load. Her crew during peacetime consisted of 29 officers and 429 enlisted men.

Omaha was powered by four Westinghouse geared steam turbines, each driving one screw, using steam generated by 12 Yarrow boilers. The engines were designed to produce 90,000 ihp (67,000 kW) and reach a top speed of 35 kn (65 km/h; 40 mph). Though the ship's design was intended to provide a range of 10,000 nmi (19,000 km; 12,000 mi) at a speed of 10 kn (19 km/h; 12 mph), she only delivered 8,460 nmi (15,670 km; 9,740 mi) at that speed.

Omaha's main armament went through many changes while she was being designed. Originally she was to mount ten 6-inch (150 mm)/53 caliber guns; two on either side at the waist, with the remaining eight mounted in tiered casemates on either side of the fore and aft superstructures. After the United States entry into World War I the US Navy worked alongside the Royal Navy and it was decided to mount four 6-inch/53 caliber guns in two twin gun turrets fore and aft and keep the eight guns in the tiered casemates so that she would have an eight gun broadside and, due to limited arcs of fire from the casemate guns, four to six guns firing fore or aft. Her secondary armament consisted of two 3-inch (76 mm)/50 caliber anti-aircraft (AA) guns in single mounts. She carried two triple and two twin, above-water, torpedo tube mounts for 21-inch (533 mm) torpedoes. The triple mounts were fitted on either side of the upper deck, aft of the midships catapults, and the twin mounts were one deck lower on either side, covered by hatches in the side of the hull. Omaha was also built with the capacity to carry 224 mines.

The ship lacked a full-length waterline armor belt. The sides of her boiler and engine rooms and steering gear were protected by three inches (76 mm) of armor. The transverse bulkheads at the end of her machinery rooms were one and a half inches (38 mm) thick forward and three inches thick aft. The conning tower and the deck over the machinery spaces and steering gear had one and a half inches of armor. The gun turrets were not armored and only provided protection against muzzle blast and splinter damage.

Omaha carried two floatplanes aboard that were stored on the two catapults. Initially these were Vought VE-9s, then Vought UO-1s, the ship then operated Curtiss SOC Seagulls from 1935, and Vought OS2U Kingfishers after 1940.

=== Armament changes ===
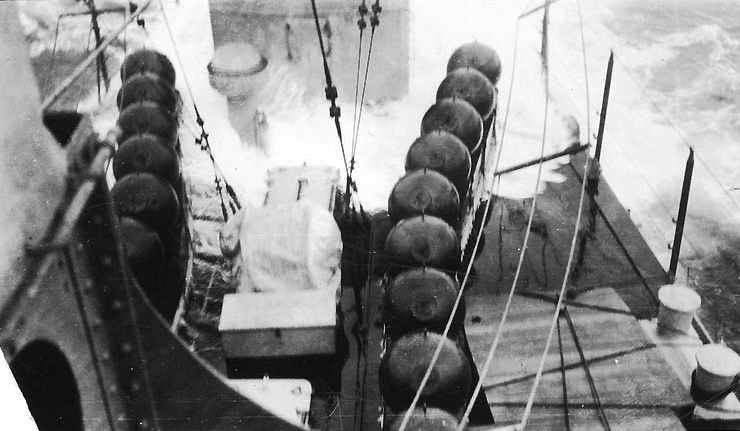
Mines on an Omaha class (CL 4–13) light cruiser. Taken while the ship was underway at sea, looking aft, showing the very wet conditions that were typical on these cruisers' after decks when they were operating in a seaway. Photographed circa 1923–1925, prior to the addition of a deckhouse just forward of the ships' after twin six-inch gun mount.

During her career Omaha went through several armament changes. Some of these changes were to save weight, while others were to increase her AA armament. On 8 September 1926, the Chief of Naval Operations, Admiral Edward W. Eberle, along with the Commanders in Chief of the United States Fleet and Battle Fleet, and their subordinate commanding officers, the Secretary of the Navy, Curtis D. Wilbur, ordered that all mines and the tracks for laying the mines be removed from all of the Omaha-class cruisers, the working conditions had been found to be very "wet". In December 1933, while she was undergoing overhaul at Bremerton, her 3-inch AA guns were increased from two to eight, all mounted in the ship's waist. The lower torpedo tube mounts, which had also proved to be very wet, were removed and the openings plated over before the start of World War II. After 1940, the lower aft 6-inch guns were removed and the casemates plated over for the same reason as the lower torpedo mounts. The ship's AA armament was first augmented by three quadruple 1.1-inch (28 mm)/75 gun mounts by early 1942, however, these didn't prove reliable and were replaced by twin 40-millimeter (1.57 in) Bofors guns later in the war. At about the same time, she also received 14 20-millimeter (0.79 in) Oerlikon cannons.

== Service history ==
=== Inter-war period ===
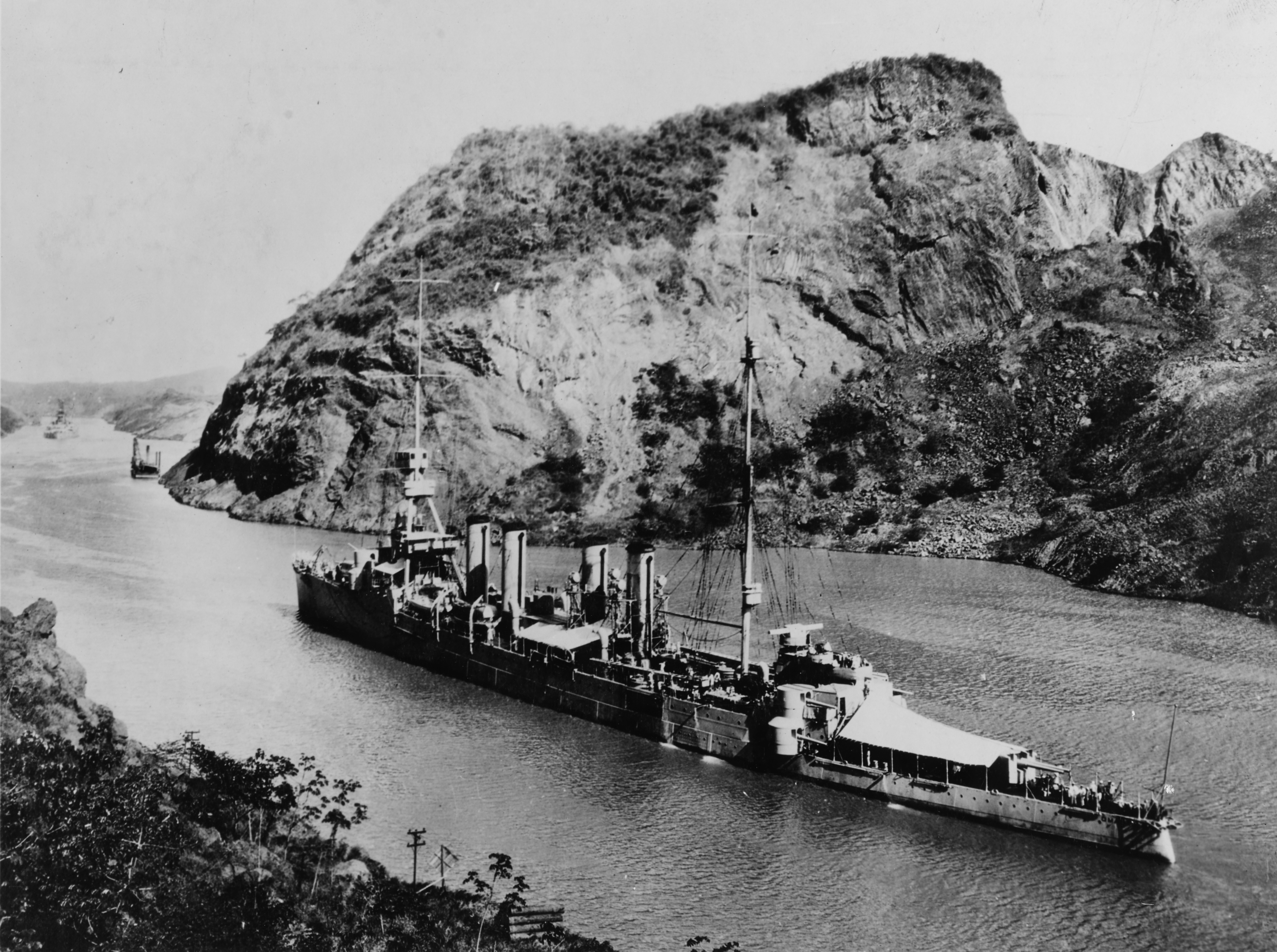
USS Omaha (CL-4) passing through the Panama Canal, c. 1925–1926 (NH 43054)

Omaha spent most of August 1923, near Puget Sound where she conducted her sea trials. On 6 October, she proceeded to Puget Sound Navy Yard to have her aircraft catapults installed. She then sailed for Mare Island Navy Yard, Vallejo, California, on 17 October, where she loaded ammunition for target practice. At the end of November and into early December 1923, Omaha conducted "Short Range Battle Practice" with the battleship Mississippi before joining the Battle Fleet on 8 December.

Not satisfied with Melville's suitability as a flagship, Rear Admiral Sumner E. W. Kittelle, Commander Destroyer Squadrons, sought a replacement. Omaha was chosen by RADM Kittelle and reported at San Diego, California, 27 December 1923. She only held the post until 14 March 1924.

Omaha fell into a routine of operations along the Pacific coast, Central America, and exercises in the Caribbean, with occasional trips to Pearl Harbor. In 1925, she visited Australia and New Zealand, and in 1930, she embarked member of the American Samoa Commission for their Congressional investigation of conditions at Pago Pago. In 1931, she sailed for the Caribbean where she joined in exercises from the end of March until early May. She then transferred to the Atlantic, where she participated in joint maneuvers with the US Army in Hampton Roads, at the end of May. From there she continued in maneuvers at Newport, Hampton Roads, and the Southern Drill Ground. Omaha sailed into the Boston Navy Yard at the end of October, where she remained until January when she set sail for her return to the Pacific.

Once again Omaha fell into her routine of steaming along the western coast until July 1937. In addition she returned to Panama several times for exercises and fleet problems, operated in Hawaiian waters and around the Aleutian Islands.

==== Grounding in the Bahamas ====
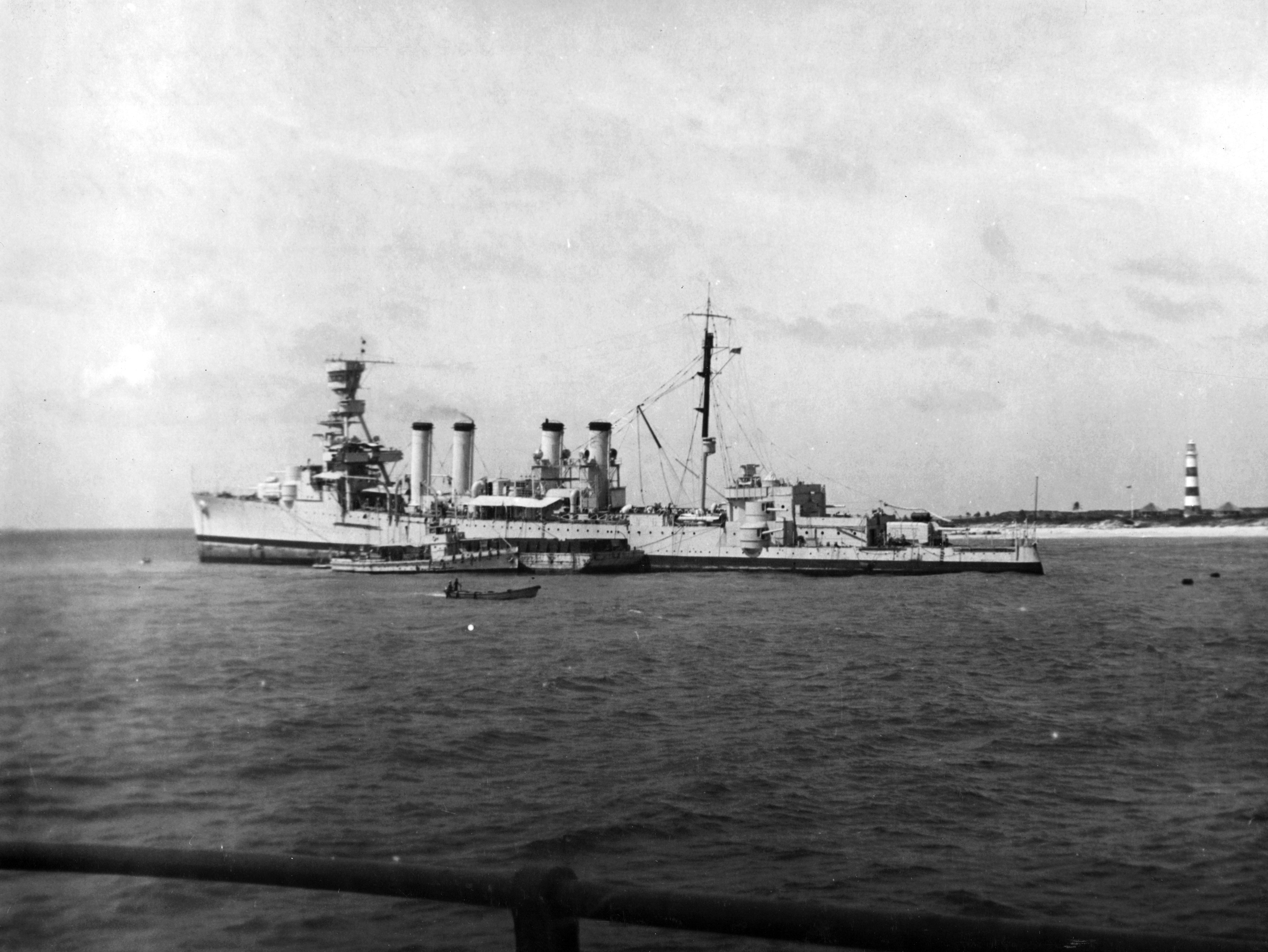
Omaha aground in the Bahamas 1937

In July 1937, Omaha was serving as flagship of the Special Service Squadron when she was relieved by the year old gunboat Erie. On 19 July, Omaha became grounded on a reef at Castle Island, Bahamas, near 22°07′35.1″N 74°19′42.0″W. During the investigation it was stated that,

"she quickly and evenly decelerated as the bottom engaged the smooth reef."

The grounding had occurred during high tide, which made dislodging the cruiser more difficult. After removing as much as possible in an attempt to lighten the ship the salvagers employed tugs to pull on Omaha while destroyers circled around them to create waves. After ten days of attempts, on 29 July, Omaha was finally floated free. She got underway the following day for the Norfolk Navy Yard, Portsmouth, Virginia, where she underwent repairs. A general court martial, held on 11 October 1937, found that Captain Howard B. Mecleary, Omaha's commanding officer at the time of the grounding, was guilty of negligence "resulting in the stranding of the vessel", he was sentenced to the loss of 25 numbers on the captain's list. On 14 February 1938, Omaha got underway after having the damage to her hull repaired, with Captain Wallace L. Lind, as her new commanding officer. She conducted sea trials while en route to Guantánamo.

==== Germany invades Poland ====
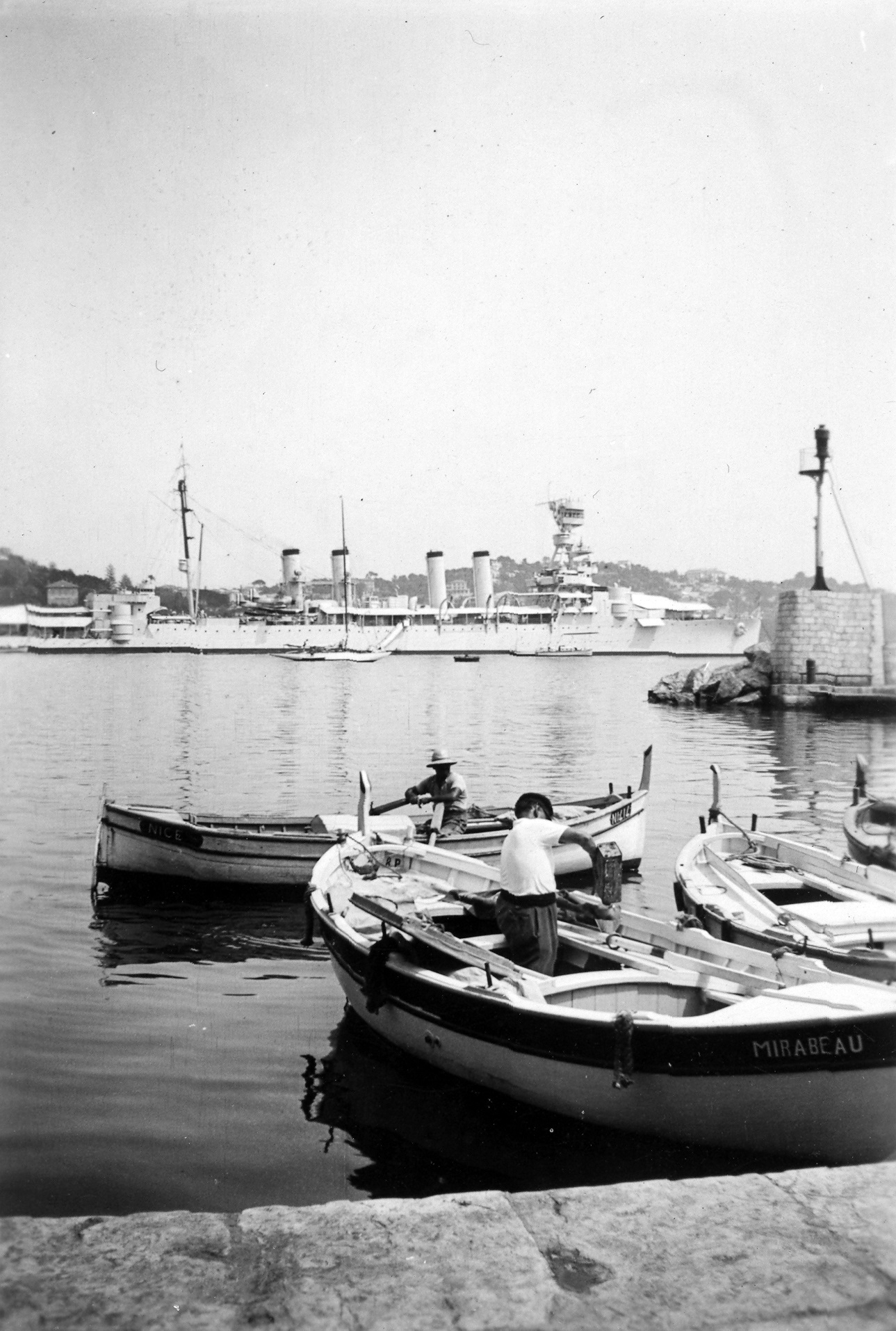
USS Omaha (CL-4) at Ville Franche, France, in 1938. Her lower torpedo tubes have been removed and plated over but her lower aft 6-inch/53-caliber guns are still in place. Her SOC "Seagulls" are on the catapults.

Omaha set sail for Gibraltar on 30 March 1938, for service in the Mediterranean Sea. Arriving in Marseille, France, 27 April 1938, she would remain in the Mediterranean for over a year, until 2 May 1939. She visited Villefranche-sur-Mer, and Menton, France, during her time before departing from Malta, for her return to the US and an extensive overhaul from 17 June until October 1939. It was during this time that, on 1 September 1939, Germany invaded Poland, starting what would become World War II.

Omaha operated in the Caribbean after her overhaul conducting gunnery and tactical exercise from the end of October until 6 December 1939, when she arrived at Havana. She had been tasked with the duty of transporting the body of J. Butler Wright, the US Ambassador to Cuba, who had died 4 December, to Washington, D.C. Upon completion, Omaha reported to Naval Operating Base (NOB), staying there until 1 April 1940.

On 1 April 1940, set sail for the Philadelphia Navy Yard before getting underway for the Caribbean. She entered San Juan, Puerto Rico, then proceeded to Guantánamo and Havana, before returning again to Philadelphia, 5 May. On 28 May, Omaha would return to Norfolk, before leaving on 22 June, for Lisbon, Portugal, and her new assignment as flagship of the temporary Squadron 40-T, which had been formed to protect US civilians and interests in Spain, during the Spanish Civil War.

Omaha was to relieve her sister ship Trenton in Lisbon. As Trenton, returning to the US, and Omaha passed each other upon her arrival the two crews cheered and waved. Omaha's band played "Hot Time in the Old Town Tonight" while Trenton's musicians responded with "Empty Saddles (in the Old Corral)". Omaha remained near Lisbon, during her service as flagship, until early October 1940, when the squadron was disbanded. On 3 October, she set sail for her return to the US. Omaha visited Monrovia, Liberia, on 10 October. During her stay the necessary conditions for modern military training and equipment for the Liberian Frontier Force were set aboard Omaha at a meeting of the US admiral David McDougal LeBreton with the Liberian Secretary Clarence Simpson. Her final stop was Pernambuco, Brazil, on 14 October, before making way for NOB the next day, where she arrived 23 October, and remained through 7 November.

From November 1940 until February 1941, Omaha was again in the Caribbean for more tactical and gunnery exercises. In February 1941, she entered the New York Navy Yard for overhaul and the installation of a radar system, her first.

Omaha got underway 28 April 1941, but engine trouble soon developed and she was forced to return to Brooklyn, for repairs to her No. 4 turbine until 25 June.

Task Force (TF) 3, which was at the time commanded by RADM Jonas H. Ingram, had initiated patrol operations out of the ports of Recife and Bahia, Brazil, on 15 June 1941. Omaha, along with three of her sisters, were among the resources that were available for Ingram's Southern Atlantic operations, along with five destroyers. On 30 June, with the propulsion and engineering issues having been resolved, Omaha steamed out of Brooklyn, to begin her Neutrality Patrols between Brazil and Ascension Island, which was part of the British Overseas Territories at the time. Omaha was tasked with enforcing a blockade against Germany by intercepting, boarding, and inspecting vessels that may have been German merchants or agents conducting trade in the region. In addition, she also tasked with escorting and protecting the convoys using the shipping lanes between South American port and the ports in Western Africa, from Axis U-boats and merchant raiders. She visited Montevideo, Uruguay, in addition to Bahia and Rio de Janeiro, Brazil, and although not at war during this time she still operated under war conditions.

==== Search for blockade runners ====
On 4 November 1941, with the report from the British oiler RFA Olwen that a German surface raider had attacked her at 03°04′N 22°42′W, Vice Admiral Algernon Willis, RN, Commander-in-Chief, South Atlantic, ordered his heavy cruiser HMS Dorsetshire, along with the armed merchant cruiser HMS Canton, to search for the raider. The light cruiser HMS Dunedin and the special service vessels HMS Queen Emma and Princess Beatrix were additionally ordered to assist in the search and departed from Freetown, Sierra Leone.

Dorsetshire and Canton separated, with Dorsetshire steaming southeast and Canton setting an opposite course. Omaha and the destroyer Somers, TG 3.6, which were positioned far northwest of the stated siting at that time, were tasked with supporting the Royal Navy ships. Memphis and the destroyers Davis and Jouett, who were near to the area reported by Olwen, were able to search the area, but were unable to locate the "German raider", while Omaha and Somers's search for survivors was also unsuccessful. The search continued the next day.

===== Capture of Odenwald =====
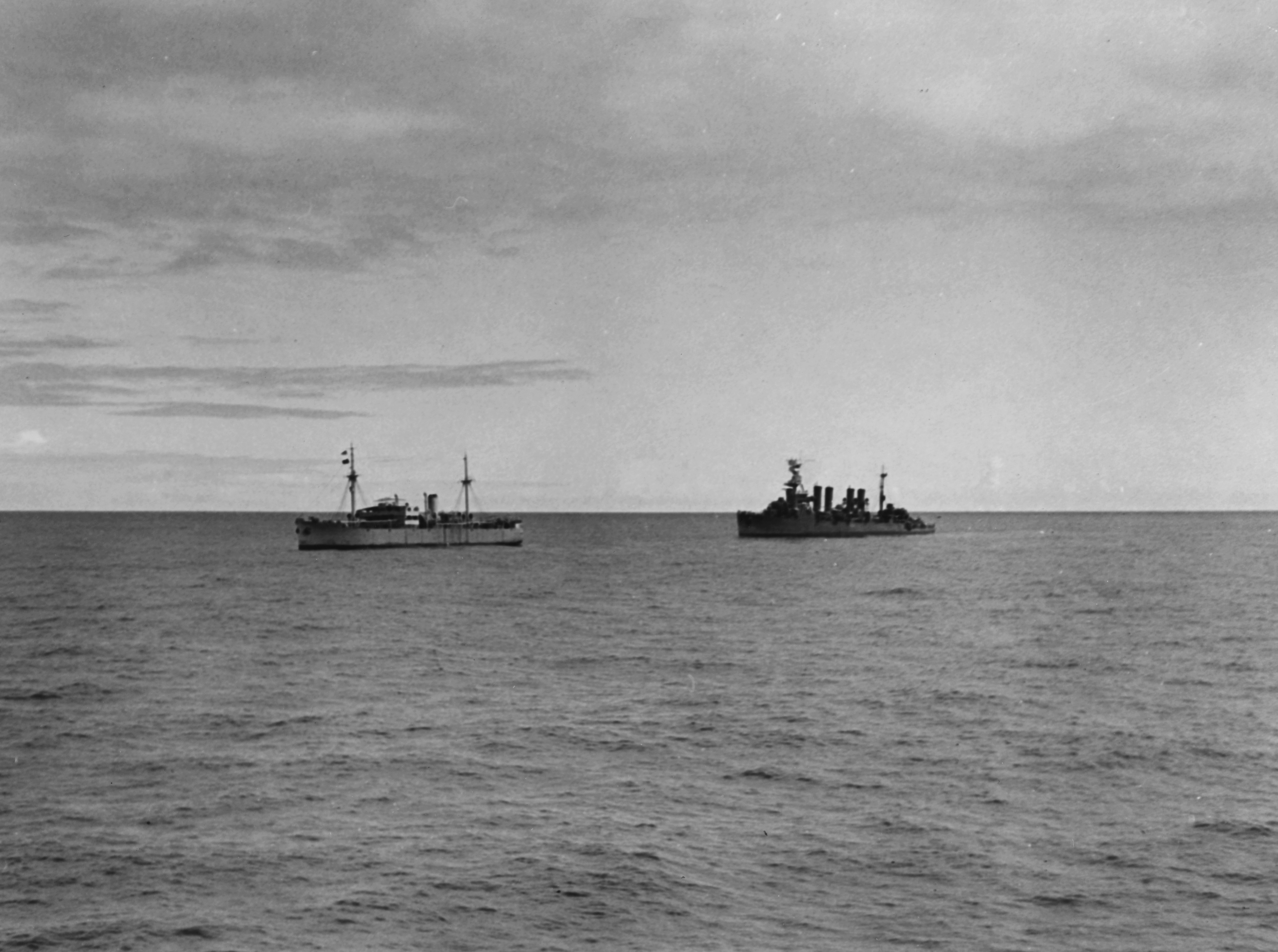
Omaha CL-4 with German Odenwald 1941, taken from Somers.

Even though the hunt for the "raider" had been unsuccessful it ultimately proved to not be entirely fruitless. On 6 November, as Omaha and Somers were en route back to Recife, returning from a 3,023 mi (4,865 km) patrol in the equatorial waters of the Atlantic, smoke was spotted, at 05:06, on the horizon. Captain Theodore E. Chandler, Omaha's commander, put her on an intercept course with the sighting. As Omaha approached the ship, which was flying US colors with the name Willmoto, out of Philadelphia, identifying her on her stern, she began taking evasive action. While multiple attempts were made to signal the merchant ship, they either went unanswered or they were given suspicious responses. Omaha's lookouts also reported that many of the crew visible on the deck of the ship were "uniquely un-American in appearance."

The ship, which identified herself as Willmoto, did not satisfactorily identify herself to the American warships. After ordering "Willmoto" to heave to, Omaha's captain dispatched an armed boarding party. At 05:37 Lieutenant George K. Carmichael, along with the boarding party, began to make way for the vessel. Around this time, the merchant hoisted the signal flags "Fox Mike", indicating that the ship was sinking and that they required assistance. Two distinct explosions could be heard within the ship when the boarding party began to climbing the ship's ladder. In an attempt to leave the sinking ship, several of the crew had lowered lifeboats, but Lt. Carmichael ordered them to return to the ship. At 05:58, Carmichael signaled to Omaha that the ship was indeed a German ship and that the crew had attempted to scuttle her. She was identified as Odenwald, a German blockade runner and that her holds were filled with 3,857 t (3,796 long tons; 4,252 short tons) of rubber, along with 103 B. F. Goodrich truck tires and sundry other cargo that totaled 6,223 t (6,125 long tons; 6,860 short tons) total.

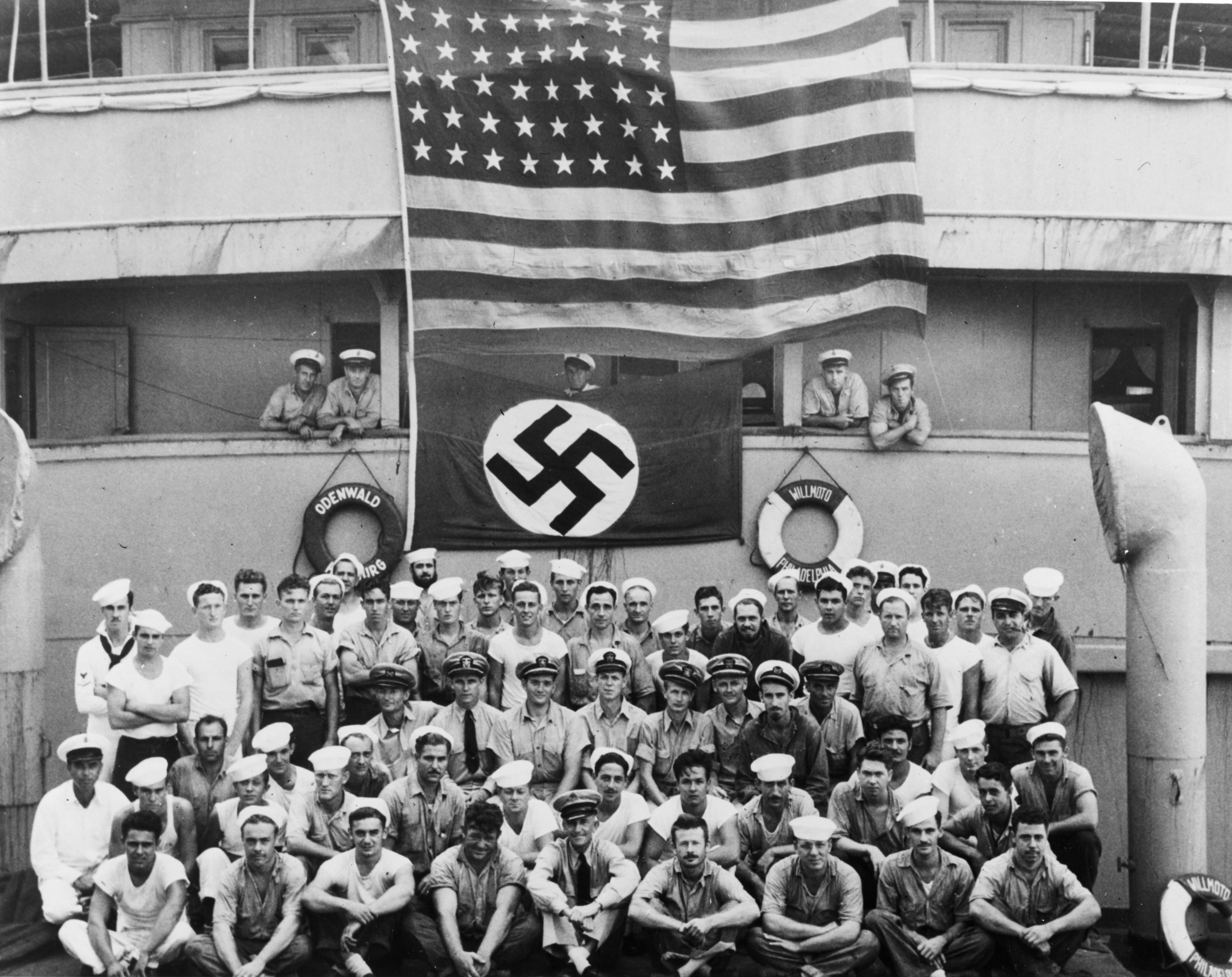
Omaha crew members posing on the deck of Odenwald

A diesel engine specialist was brought over from Somers's crew to assist with the repairs and prevent Odenwald's sinking. Omaha's SOC floatplanes and Somers guarded the area while the boarding party made Odenwald sea worthy. With repairs finished the three ships set course for Port of Spain, Trinidad, to avoid possible difficulties with the government of Brazil.

Omaha arrived at Port of Spain, on 17 November 1941, with Odenwald flying the German flag on the mast with the US flag flying over it. On the following day, in the U.S. District Court for the District of Puerto Rico, the United States sued the Odenwald, on its own behalf as well as that of the Omaha's crew, seeking an award for marine salvage services. Judgment for salvors did not come until April 30, 1947. The court awarded the United States $72, 212.40 in compensation and expenses. Members of the Omaha's boarding party each won $3000, and the remainder of her crew won two months' pay and allowances. The judgment was affirmed on appeal.

=== World War II ===
On 7 December 1941, Omaha was steaming with Somers from San Juan to Recife, when she received a communication that informed her captain that the Japanese had attacked the Pacific Fleet at Pearl Harbor. She was ordered to "execute WPL (war plan) 46 (Rainbow 5) against Japan." Captain Chandler mustered the crew to read them the message. On 8 December, the US Congress would officially declare war on Japan with Germany declaring war on the US three days later, on 11 December 1941.

==== Merchant sinkings ====
While Omaha was on patrol with Jouett on 8 May 1942, she came across the Swedish ship Astri. Omaha's boarding party found Ensign John F. Kelly, USNR, from the US freighter Lammot Du Pont, along with six members of her armed guard detachment and eight crewmen. She had been sunk on 23 April, by U-125 (Kapitänleutnnt Ulrich Folkers) 500 mi (800 km) southeast of Bermuda. The men had drifted for two days before being picked up. The Office of Naval Operations (OpNav) had informed Omaha that they suspected the Swedish ship of being a tender for German U-boats. Jouett was left to investigate Astri while Omaha set a course to Recife, with the survivors of Lammot Du Pont. Having been pointed to the area by a patrolling aircraft, the destroyer Tarbell was able to rescue another 23 survivors from Lammot Du Pont on 16 May.

Omaha spotted a light on the horizon at 01:30, on 1 June 1942. The light was from a small lifeboat with eight surviving crewmen aboard from the sunken British merchant Charlbury. She had been heading to Buenos Aires, Argentina, when she had been attacked on 28 May, by the Italian submarine Barbarigo. The first torpedo fired by Barbarigo had missed Charlbury, at which point the submarine surfaced to attack with her 10 cm (3.9 in) deck guns before submerging again. With her second torpedo attack Barbarigo struck Charlbury which caused the merchant to sink by the stern. Omaha went on to pull another 32 survivors of the sinking from the water and transported all of them to Recife.

On 8 June 1942, only a week later, eight British seamen, from the British merchant Harpagon, where found aboard the Argentinian merchantman Rio Diamante by Omaha. They were the only survivors, 41 had died in the 20 April, attack by U-109 (Kapitänleutnant Heinrich Bleichrodt) near the island of Bermuda. The survivors, being adrift for 35 days, stayed in Rio Diamante, which transported them to Buenos Aires, Argentina.

In a two-day period, 16–17 August 1942, five Brazilian merchantmen were sunk by U-507 (Korvettenkapitän Harro Schact). More than 500 men had been killed in these attacks on Brazilian shipping which were outside of the territorial waters of Brazil. U-507 then destroyed a sixth vessel on 19 August, that was flying Brazilian colors. On 22 August 1942, while Omaha was waiting for her harbor pilot to take her in at Montevideo, Uruguay, her crew were able to observe the rusting hulk of the German cruiser Admiral Graf Spee that had been scuttled almost three years earlier on 18 December 1939, after the Battle of the River Plate. When Omaha had moored, a Brazilian naval officer visited Captain Chandler and informed him Brazil was preparing for a formal declaration of war against both Germany and Italy. The declaration was promulgated that day.

==== Hazards of life at sea ====
Even as the threat from Germany and Italy had diminished by August 1942, there were still many ways for the men of Omaha to be harmed. One day, as she was at anchor in Carenage Bay, Trinidad, one of her sailors had returned from an especially "hard liberty" and found a spot on Omaha's direction finder deck to sleep off the effects. When the ship rolled unexpectedly the inebriated sailor rolled from the deck, down an awning, across the quarterdeck and then over the side and into the water. According to Captain Chandler, "probably due to his perfectly relaxed condition", the sailor was uninjured. Other such occurrences did not always end as well.

On 30 October 1942, while in Trinidad, six of Omaha's baseball team were injured when one of the sides of the truck carrying them fell off. Just six days later, while Omaha and Marblehead were on escort duty, one of her newly arrived Vought OS2U Kingfishers flipped upon landing, while the aviator was able to make it out safely, the plane sustained serious damage which required it to need overhauling when Omaha put back into port.

Tragedy did strike Marblehead though in November 1942. As her whaleboat was being hoisted back aboard, a sailor from her landing party fell overboard and failed to ever resurface. The sailor had a newly issued style of life vest on that required being inflated by mouth. This incident brought Captain Chandler to order that Omaha's boarding party's return to wearing the older style life jackets that had proven themselves effective even though they were more cumbersome and bulky.

==== Collision with Milwaukee ====
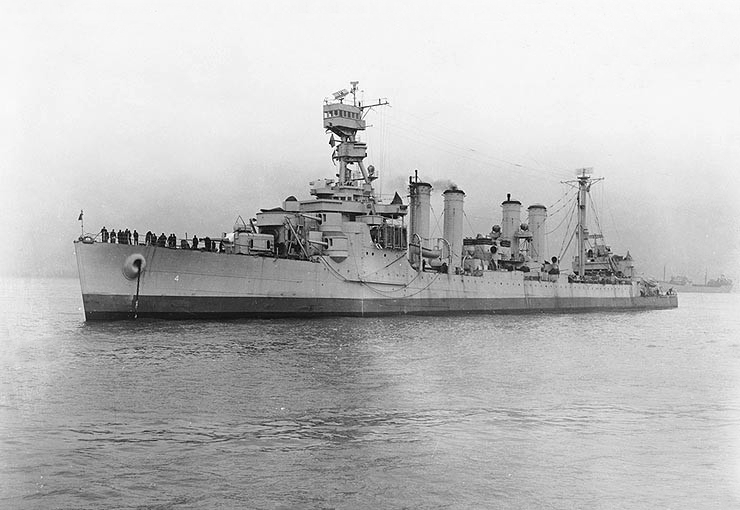
USS Omaha (CL-4) off the New York Naval Shipyard on 10 February 1943 (NH 97972)

The year 1943 proved to be quiet for Omaha. Escorting the stores ship Pollux regularly out of Recife, and patrolling the southern Atlantic with her sister ships Milwaukee, Memphis, Cincinnati, and the destroyer Moffett, she did not come in contact with any enemy ships or submarines or the aftermath of their attacks.

The only damage she took that year occurred 30 April 1943, while she was changing stations on formation, Milwaukee struck Omaha's starboard bow. The collision destroyed one of her paravanes and rupturing some plating, which caused some flooding. Omaha's damage control party shored up one hole with two mattresses and were able to stop the leak. One compartment was completely flooded with another compartment requiring pumping out every two hours. On Milwaukee, the 6-inch guns and torpedo tubes on her port side were unserviceable. Several holes had opened up along her port side that were above the main deck, along with some leaks under the waterline from damage to plates and rivets. Milwaukee also lost her No.3 main circulation pump. The damage was determined not to be serious enough to halt their mission and the two cruisers, after completing their patrol, put into Rio de Janeiro for the needed repairs at the Rio de Janeiro Navy Arsenal.

==== Sinking of Rio Grande and Burgenland ====
Omaha's time of relatively ordinary operations came to an end very early in 1944. While patrolling out of Recife, with Jouett on 4 January, one of Omaha's aircraft spotted a ship about 55 mi (89 km) northeast of the Brazilian coast. Omaha challenged the vessel at 10:20, with one of her searchlights, that produced no response from the unknown contact. Lookouts were able to spot two guns mounted on the ship's bow though, and soon after a large cloud of heavy smoke was observed coming from the stern of the ship, indicating that her crew were probably in the process of scuttling the ship to avoid capture. As Omaha pulled along the unknown ship's port side she began to fire with her starboard battery as Jouett also began firing. The ship's crew were then observed attempting to escape off her stern in lifeboats. Omaha's crew tried to force the sailors back aboard with machine gun fire, but it became clear that the vessel was not salvageable. Omaha began firing on the vessel again, which soon sank by her stern. With fears that this surface action may have alerted enemy U-boats in the area, Omaha and Jouett withdrew without picking up any of the survivors. The ship was later identified as a German blockade runner named Rio Grande. Marblehead was able to rescue 72 survivors later on 8 January.

Omaha returned the following day to the vicinity that Rio Grande had been sunk and again encountered an unknown merchant steamer. She once again challenged the unknown contact with her searchlight, and again received no response to her signals. This time Omaha fired two warning shots over the unknown ship's bow, due to the fact that it appeared that she was dead in the water. An explosion was observed, followed by smoke billowing from her. Captain Elwood M. Tillson ordered Omaha's 6-inch battery to train on the unknown contact and open fire. Captain Tillson then allowed members of the crew to rotate topside to observe the gunfire since many of the men were unable to view the action against Rio Grande the previous day. The ship, later identified as another German blockade runner, Burgenland, sank by her stern thirty minutes later. Two days later 21 of her survivors were rescued by Davis with Winslow able to retrieve an additional 35 crewmen on 8 January.

==== Recovery of U-177 survivors ====
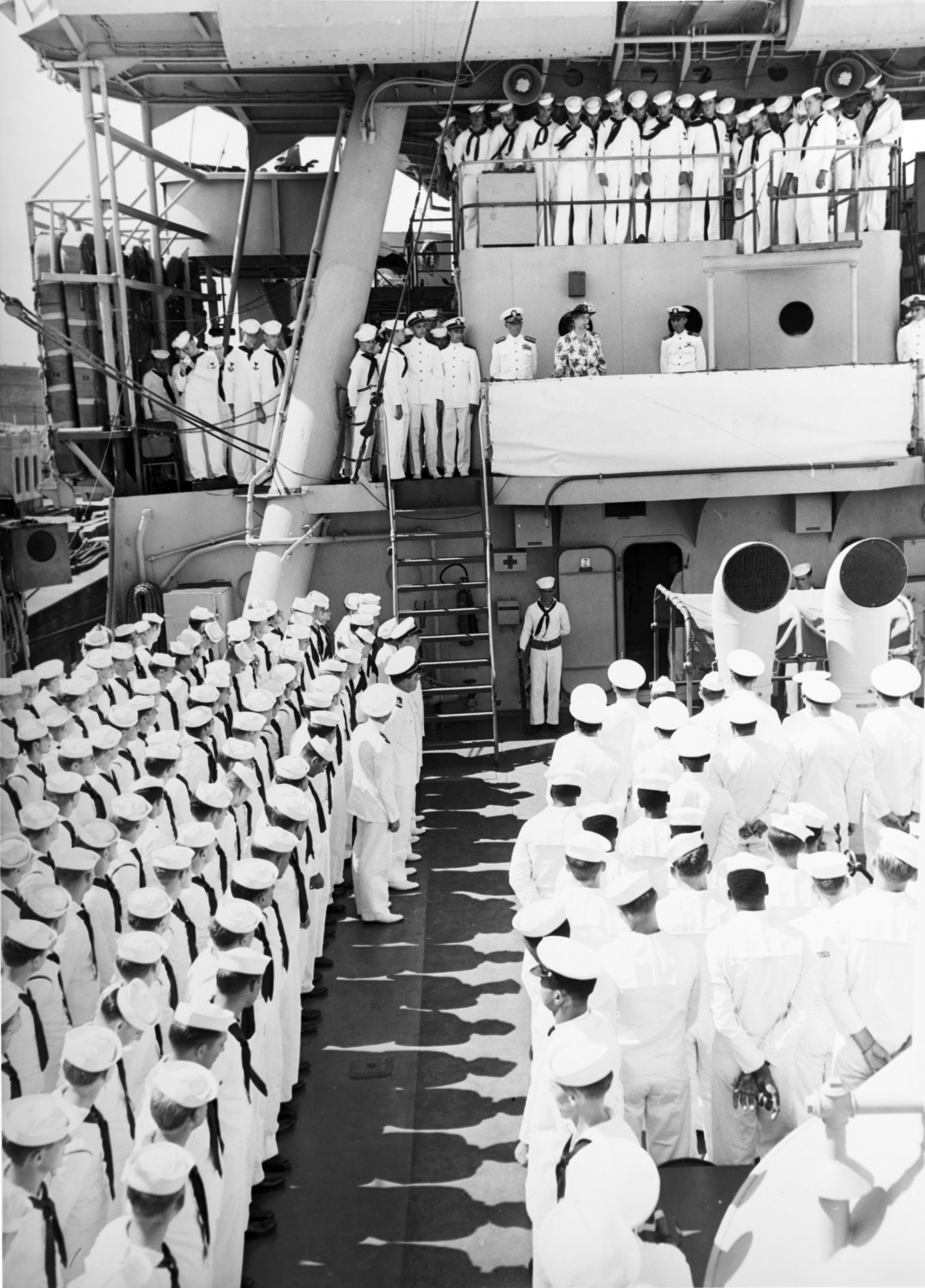
Omaha hosted First Lady Eleanor Roosevelt and RADM Oliver M. Read, Commander, Surface Patrol Force (TF 41), 16 March 1944, at Recife, Brazil.

Omaha was out patrolling with Memphis and Jouett on 6 February 1944, when the ships were given orders to be on the lookout for the survivors of a U-boat that had been sunk earlier in the day near their location. A yellow life raft was later spotted by Omaha's lookouts. The occupants were German sailors that had survived the sinking of their boat, U-177, that had been sunk by a Consolidated PB4Y-1 Liberator from Bombing Squadron (VB) 107 that was operating out of Ascension Island. U-177 had been sitting on the surface while some of the crew were sunning and swimming.

According to Leutnant zur See Hans-Otto Brodt, their commanding officer Korvettenkapitän Heinz Bucholz and another 50 men of the crew of 64, went down with the ship. The prisoners were sent to the sick bay for treatment of shock and exposure and supplied with fresh clothing that had been provided by the Red Cross. Until Omaha put in at Bahia, on 15 February, where they debarked and were transported to Recife, the Germans were placed under armed guard.

==== Transfer to the European Theater ====
On 4 July 1944, Omaha got underway to the European Theater with destroyer escorts Marts, Reybold, and troop transport General W. A. Mann. On 13 July, the convoy arrived at Gibraltar, with the addition of Marsh, Hollis, and the destroyer Kearny. Omaha set sail for Palermo, Sicily, on 18 July, in company with the battleships Nevada and Arkansas.

===== Operation Dragoon =====
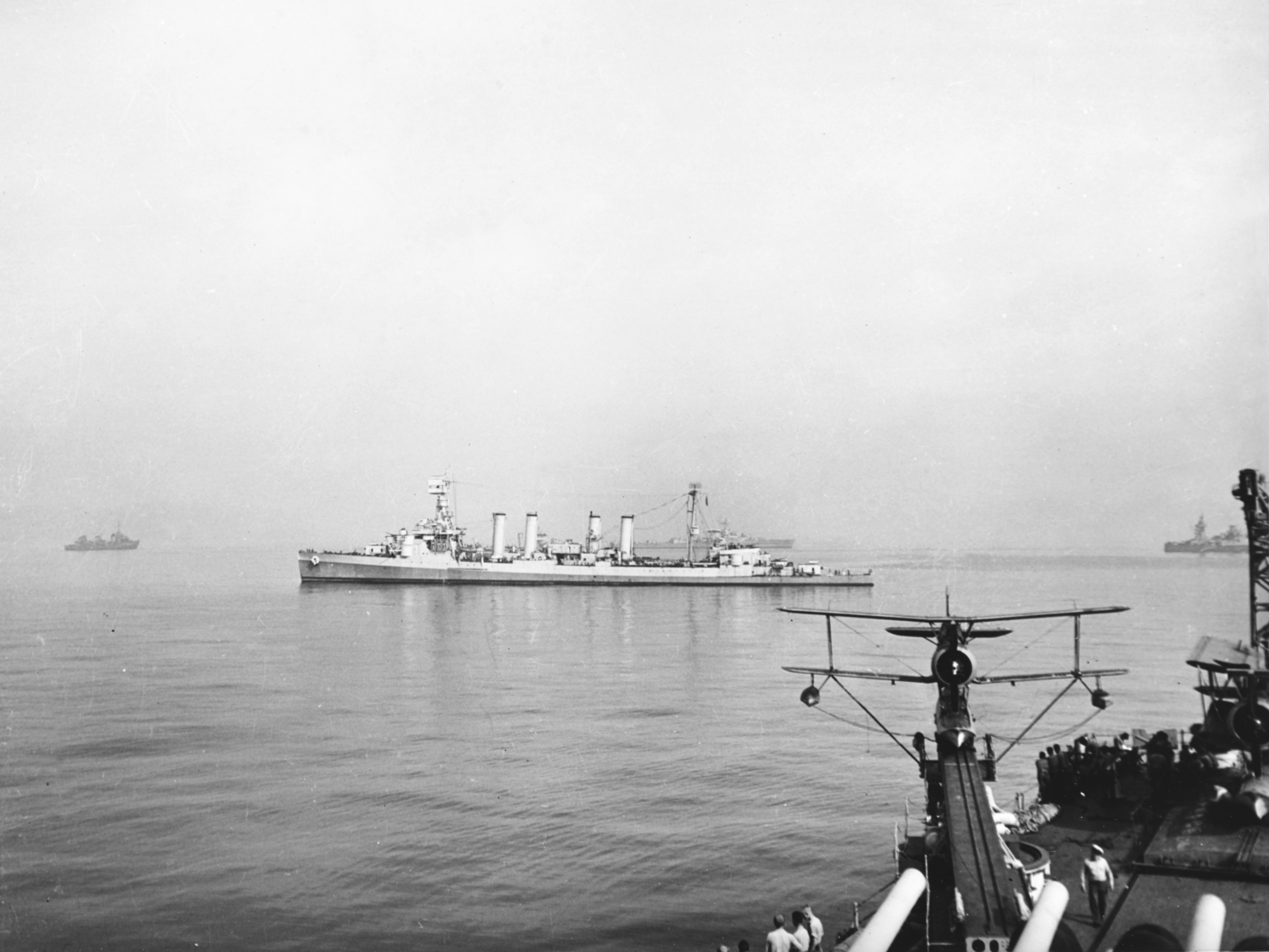
Omaha during the landings in Southern France, August 1944, photographed from Philadelphia. In the distance are (from left to right): a French Navy destroyer, a French light cruiser, and Augusta.

On 7 August 1944, Omaha was guarding the flank of a formation consisting of the US heavy cruisers Quincy and Augusta, the battleship Nevada and the French battleship Lorraine, bombarding Toulon, France. Omaha assisted in the bombardment firing 24 rounds. An enemy shore battery began firing on Omaha at 17:17, Quincy was able to lay a smoke screen out for her while she fired 3.5-inch (89 mm) rockets in an attempt to jam their radar. Again on 20 August, while she was supporting Nevada, she once again drew fire from the enemy as she was departing from the area with the shells splashing 1,000 yd (910 m) off her stern and 3,000 yd (2,700 m) off of her port quarter.

Shortly after, while she was at Porquerolles, France, Omaha responded to the net tender Hackberry, that had come under fire from a German shore battery, by firing 73 6-inch rounds into the enemy position.

Omaha departed the assault area on 27 August 1944, and returned to Palermo, before getting underway to Oran, Algeria, with Cincinnati, Marblehead, Quincy, and the destroyer McLanahan. This group then sailed from Oran, on 1 September, after being joined by MacKenzie, for the Atlantic. When the formation exited the Mediterranean, Marblehead detached from the group and proceeded west independently.

After Omaha returned to Bahia, 9 September, she once again resumed her previous duties of patrolling the southern Atlantic and providing escort services. A break in this routine occurred when she returned to the North Atlantic while escorting the transport General M. C. Meigs in company with the Brazilian Marcílio Dias-class destroyers Mariz e Barros and Marcilio Dias to Gibraltar. They reached their destination on 4 December, where Omaha handed her escort duty off to Edison. She then proceeded by herself to Sandy Hook, New Jersey, where she arrived on 14 December, and put in the next day to the New York Navy Yard. Omaha ended 1944 in New York, while undergoing repairs and alterations that would improve the living spaces for her crew.

==== Search for the Brazilian cruiser Bahia ====
When the Brazilian cruiser Bahia (C.12) was reported sunk by a submarine, Omaha set out from Recife, on 8 July 1945, on a search and rescue operation. A report came in from the British steamer Balfe that they had picked up 33 survivors from Bahia. Omaha set course to intercept Balfe so she could transfer her medical staff and aid in treatment of the remaining survivors. In all, only 44 sailors were rescued, with seven dying from their injuries, and eight bodies recovered, out of a crew of 346. An investigation into the sinking of Bahia later determined that on 4 July 1945, while conducting anti-aircraft training, a gunner that had shot down a trailing target kite continued to fire as he was trailing the target's descent. Because the proper safety stops had not been installed on the gun he was able to inadvertently fire into a rack of live depth charges that were positioned on the fantail of the ship.

== Decommissioning ==
Following the sinking of Bahia, Omaha continued to serve in the South Atlantic, until 12 August, two days after the Japanese announced their intention of surrendering under the terms of the Potsdam Declaration, when she departed Recife, for the last time. She made ports of call at San Juan and Norfolk, before getting underway for the Philadelphia Naval Shipyard. Soon after arriving in Philadelphia, a Board of Inspection and Survey recommended that Omaha be taken out of commission.

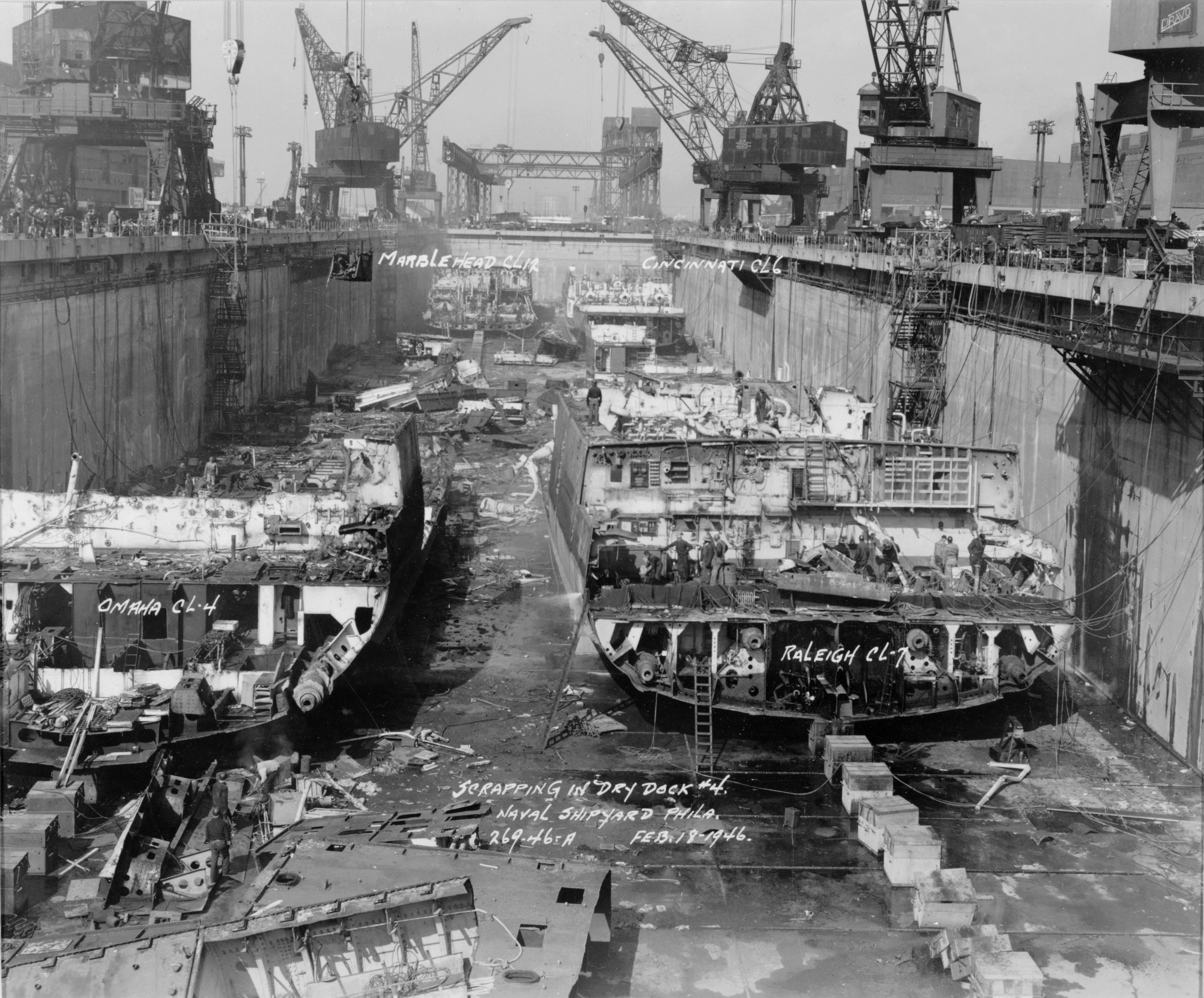
Philadelphia Naval Shipyard, 18 February 1946, scrapping in Dry Dock #4 of Marblehead, Cincinnati, Omaha, and Raleigh.

Omaha was decommissioned on 1 November 1945, and was struck from the Navy Register on 28 November 1945. She was scrapped at the Philadelphia Naval Shipyard by February 1946.

== Notable commanders ==
Name	Date	Final rank attained
Captain Frederick Joseph Horne	14 June 1924 – 16 January 1926	Admiral
Captain Cyrus Willard Cole	16 January 1926 – 25 August 1927	Rear Admiral
Captain Lyal Ament Davidson	1 February 1939 – 1 September 1939	Vice Admiral
Captain Theodore Edson Chandler	15 October 1941 – April 1943	Rear Admiral

== Awards ==
- American Defense Service Medal with "A" device
- American Campaign Medal
- European–African–Middle Eastern Campaign Medal with one battle star
- World War II Victory Medal

== Bibliography ==
- Curtis, Susan (2008). Colored memories: a biographer's quest for the elusive Lester A. Walton. Columbia, Missouri: University of Missouri Press. pp. 188–230. ISBN 978-0-8262-1786-8.
- Friedman, Norman (1984). U.S. Cruisers: An Illustrated Design History. Naval Institute Press. ISBN 978-0-87021-718-0.
- Ships' Data, U. S. Naval Vessels. US Naval Department. 1 July 1921. pp. 54–59.
- Ships' Data, U. S. Naval Vessels. US Navy Department. 1 July 1935. pp. 24–31.
- "Table 21 – Ships on Navy List June 30, 1919". Congressional Serial Set. U.S. Government Printing Office: 771. 1921.
- Terzibashitsch, Stefan (1988). Cruisers of the US Navy 1922–1962. Naval Institute Press. ISBN 0-87021-974-X.
- Watts, John W. (10 April 2017). "Omaha II (CL-4)". Dictionary of American Naval Fighting Ships. Navy Department, Naval History and Heritage Command. This article incorporates text from this source, which is in the public domain.
- Whitley, M.J. (1995). Cruisers of World War II. Naval Institute Press. ISBN 1-55750-141-6.
- Barnes, Harry Elmer (1953). Perpetual War for Perpetual Peace: A Critical Examination of the Foreign Policy of Franklin Delano Roosevelt And Its Aftermath. Caxton Printers.
- Bertke, Donald A.; Smith, Gordon; Kindell, Don (2013). World War II Sea War, Vol 6: The Allies Halt the Axis Advance. Bertke Publications. ISBN 978-1-937470-09-8.
- "Navy Announces 3 Ships Sunk in Waters Off US". Chicago Daily Tribune. Vol. CI, no. 133. 2 June 1942. p. 8.
- "USS Omaha (CL-4)". NavSource. 12 February 2017.
- Wolsey, L.H. (1942). "Capture of the German Steamship "Odenwald"". The American Journal of International Law. 36 (1): 96–99. doi:10.2307/2192196. JSTOR 2192196. S2CID 146832810.
- Oliver, Edward F. (1956). "The Odenwald Incident". Nav. Inst. Proc. 82 (4): 379–384.
