= HMS Queen Emma =

Royal Navy commando troop ship of WWII

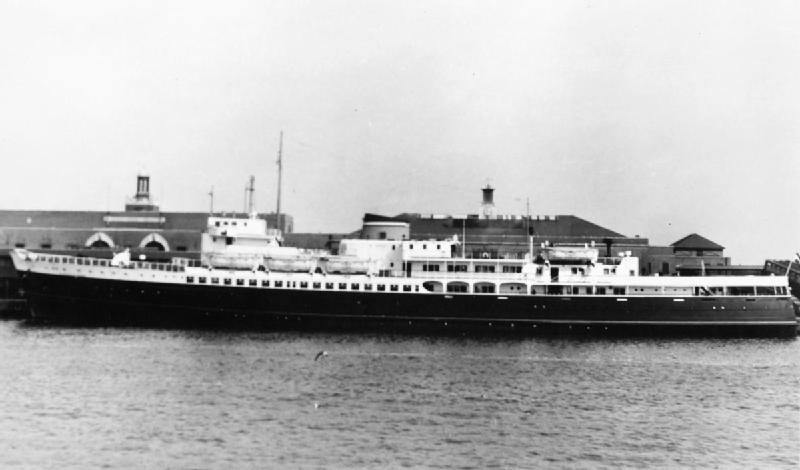
- HMS Queen Emma

History

Netherlands
- Name: Koningin Emma
- Namesake: Emma of the Netherlands
- Owner: Stoomvaart Maatschappij Zeeland
- Ordered: December 1937
- Builder: De Schelde, Vlissingen
- Yard number: 209
- Laid down: 7 May 1938
- Launched: 14 January 1939
- Completed: 19 May 1939
- In service: 4 June 1939
- Out of service: 1 September 1939
- Fate: Requisitioned by the Ministry of War Transport, 15 May 1940

United Kingdom
- Name: HMS Queen Emma
- Acquired: 15 May 1940
- Commissioned: 22 January 1941
- Decommissioned: 29 April 1946
- Honours and awards: Battle honours : Norway; Dieppe; North Africa; Sicily; Atlantic; Mediterranean; Normandy
- Fate: Returned to the Netherlands, 29 April 1946

Netherlands
- Name: Koningin Emma
- Acquired: 29 April 1946
- In service: 5 March 1948
- Out of service: 1968
- Fate: Scrapped in Antwerp, 1968

General characteristics (as built)
- Tonnage: 4,135 GRT; 2,100 NRT
- Length: 380 ft (120 m) o/a; 351 ft (107 m) p/p
- Beam: 47 ft (14 m)
- Draught: 13 ft 6 in (4.11 m)
- Decks: 5
- Propulsion: 2 × Sulzer diesel engines, 12,500 shp (9,321 kW)
- Speed: 24.5 knots (45.4 km/h; 28.2 mph)
- Capacity: 1,800 passengers
- Crew: 58
- Armament: As HMS "Queen Emma" : 2 × 12-pounder (76 mm) guns; 2 × 2-pounder (40 mm) machine guns; 4 × 20 mm Hotchkiss machine guns; 4 × .303 calibre machine guns

HMS Queen Emma was a commando troop ship of the Royal Navy during the Second World War. Built as a civilian passenger liner in 1939 by De Schelde at Vlissingen, she was named the MS Koningin Emma, after Queen Emma of the Netherlands, and operated by Stoomvaart Maatschappij Zeeland (SMZ) (The Zealand Steamship Company) between Flushing and Harwich, along with her sister ship, MS Prinses Beatrix. After fleeing to Britain after the German invasion in 1940, she was requisitioned by the British Ministry of War Transport, renamed HMS Queen Emma and converted to a troopship at Harland and Wolff's yard in Belfast. During the war her main role was transporting British Commandos, and she participated in the Lofoten Islands Raid and the Dieppe Raid. She had the advantage of a high speed that allowed hit and run operations. Later designated as a Landing Ship, Infantry (Medium) she took part in the landings in North Africa, Sicily and Normandy. She operated in the Indian Ocean, and in the Dutch East Indies after the end of the war. In 1946 Queen Emma was returned to her owners and continued to operate as ferry from the Hook of Holland until 1969, when she was scrapped in Antwerp, Belgium.

== Construction ==
The MS Koningin Emma was ordered by the Stoomvaart Maatschappij Zeeland (SMZ) in December 1937 to operate between Vlissingen (Flushing) and Harwich. The keel was laid on 7 May 1938 at the De Schelde shipyard at Vlissingen, and the ship was launched on 14 January 1939 by Queen Wilhelmina. However the Emma stuck on the slipway and it took more than four hours to free her.

During sea trials Koningin Emma made more than 24.5 knots (45.4 km/h; 28.2 mph) which was 1.5 knots (2.8 km/h; 1.7 mph) more than was contractually agreed. On 19 May 1939 the ship was handed over to the SMZ. It had a gross tonnage of 4,135 tons and was capable of carrying 1,800 passengers. Propulsion was provided by two 2-stroke Sulzer diesel engines with a total output of 12,500 shp.

== Service history ==
Koningin Emma entered service on 4 June 1939, but after the outbreak of war on 1 September 1939, was withdrawn, and remained in port. On 10 May 1940 the Germans launched their invasion of the Netherlands, dropping mines in the Schelde estuary, and bombing and strafing shipping. Koningin Emma promptly fled, arriving at London on 15 May.

=== Troop transport ===
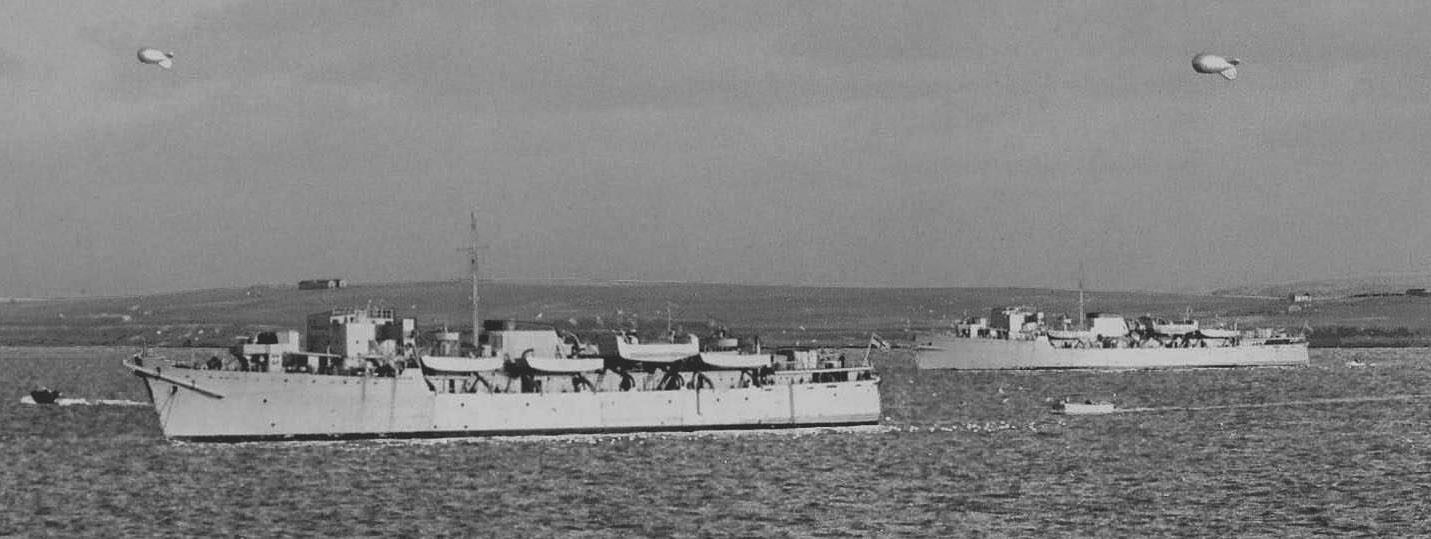
The class was converted to Assault Ships and would see their first action during the evacuation of Dunkirk with their original Dutch crew.

Two days later the British Ministry of War Transport chartered her as a troop transport. She was fitted with "degaussing" coils as protection against German magnetic mines and sailed with her original civilian crew on board in addition to a Dutch Marine detachment.

The ship was ordered to take French troops evacuated to England from Dunkirk back to Brest to continue the fight. She left Plymouth on 2 June and sailed with 1,712 aboard, accompanied by the French corvette Commandant Rivière. They returned the next day, then sailed once more with approximately 1,500 men on board, returning with British troops. On 16 June Koningin Emma, made her last voyage to Brest. By now the Germans had occupied most of northern France, so she was ordered to Bayonne on 20 June where 1,482 evacuees were boarded.

Koningin Emma then took part in the British occupation of Iceland, landing troops and equipment. In September 1940 Koningin Emma was formally taken over by the Admiralty to be converted into an "assault ship" at the Harland and Wolff shipyard in Belfast. The upper deck was largely cleared and gravity davits installed enabling six LCAs and two LCM(1)s to be carried, along with 450 troops. Koningin Emma was armed with two 12-pounder guns, two 2-pounders, four Hotchkiss 20 mm machine guns, and four .303 cal. machine guns. The ship was commissioned as HMS Queen Emma on 22 January 1941 as a special service ship.

=== Lofoten Raid ===
Her first major action in her new role was Operation Claymore, a raid on the Lofoten Islands in northern Norway. On 22 February 1941 Queen Emma arrived at Scapa Flow, where men of 4 Commando boarded, as well as Royal Engineer demolition experts and a contingent of Norwegian troops. The British ships – five destroyers and two troop ships – entered the Vestfjord on the morning of 4 March, and launched their attack. Surprise was complete and there was little resistance. All targets selected were located and destroyed. The troops were embarked by 13.00 hours and within half an hour the British had left. After returning to England Queen Emma was used for the training and exercise of Special Forces in Scotland.

=== South Atlantic ===
In late 1941 she was selected to join the forces gathered at Freetown, Sierra Leone, for Operation Pilgrim, the planned occupation of the Canary Islands, if either the Spanish or the Germans captured Gibraltar. After maintenance at Glasgow Queen Emma sailed to Freetown, arriving on 5 October 1941. However, it soon became clear that Franco did not plan to join the Axis, nor was he prepared to allow the German troops free passage through Spain to attack Gibraltar, and the operation was cancelled.

On 4 November 1941 the British navy tanker RFA Olwen reported that she had been attacked by a German raider, between Natal, Brazil and Freetown. Queen Emma was one of the ships sent to search. No German raider was found and the Admiralty assumed that a German U-boat had shot at the tanker. However, on 22 November the Atlantis was sunk by the British cruiser Devonshire in the southern Atlantic close to Ascension Island, and on 1 December the cruiser Dorsetshire sank the German supply ship Python in the same area. Almost all the crews from both ships were taken aboard German and Italian submarines. The British feared that the Germans would try to land on Ascension and overwhelm the tiny garrison. Queen Emma was hurriedly loaded with troops and set sail. However, while en route it was learned that the German crewmen were on their way to Bordeaux and the ship was recalled.

On 14 February 1942 Queen Emma left Freetown, and returned to England for refitting, after which she was reclassified as a Landing Ship, Infantry (Medium).

=== Dieppe Raid ===
In April 1942 Queen Emma was selected to take part in a raid on the French coast at Dieppe. On the evening of 18 August 1942 a fleet of more than 200 ships sailed across the Channel. Queen Emma and the former Belgian ship Princess Astrid landed men of the Royal Regiment of Canada on "Blue Beach" to the east of Dieppe at Puys. However, the raid was not a success, and the losses were high.

=== Invasion of North Africa ===
Queen Emma was then assigned to Training Squadron D based on the Clyde, carrying out exercises with Special Forces and practising the landing of ground troops on enemy beaches. All these exercises were in preparation for the landings in North Africa, Operation Torch. On 26 October 1942 Queen Emma received troops from the 1st Battalion of the U.S. 6th Armored Infantry Regiment, then joined Convoy KMF-1 for North Africa, landing her troops west of Oran.

=== The Moonlight Squadron ===
Queen Emma remained in the western Mediterranean, supplying and transporting reinforcements for the First Army. On the evening of Friday, 13 November 1942, Queen Emma left Algiers with units of the British 78th Infantry Division for Bône, close to the front line. On the return trip to Algiers she was repeatedly attacked by German aircraft, but made port without damage.

Queen Emma, her sister ship Princess Beatrix, and the former Burn & Laird Lines ships Royal Scotsman and Royal Ulsterman became known as the "Moonlight Squadron" for their preference for operating at night. After the fall of Tunis in May 1943 the ships received a special commendation from the Allied Army Commanders and a letter from the British Admiral Andrew Cunningham, the commander in chief of the western Mediterranean.

=== Invasion of Sicily ===
Queen Emma was then attached to the ships of Operation Husky, the invasion of Sicily. The British sector was greatly hampered by severe German air attacks, and on 17 July 1943 the Queen Emma was hit, with 18 killed and 70 wounded. The ship sailed to Malta for repairs. Her speed had been reduced to 15 knots (28 km/h; 17 mph), so she was downgraded to troop transport vessel. After the Italian capitulation on 8 September 1943 she escorted units of the Italian fleet to Malta, and soon afterwards sailed back to England for a complete overhaul.

=== Invasion of France ===
Queen Emma then began landing exercises in preparation for Operation Overlord, the invasion of France. On 6 June 1944 Queen Emma sailed with Canadian troops to Normandy. The ship was part of the transport group of the Eastern Naval Task Force under the command of Lieutenant Colonel Chandler. In the weeks after D-Day Queen Emma completed numerous voyages between England and the French coast, carrying men of the U.S. 8th Air Force, and a number of British Guards Divisions, as well as units of the English ATS and Wrens, despite the danger of German coastal batteries, E-boats and midget submarines.

At the end of 1944, during the Battle of the Bulge Queen Emma helped transport the British 6th Airborne Division from England to France as reinforcements. It would be her last European mission. She had crossed the North Sea 43 times, sailing approximately 20,000 miles and had transported 30,000 Allied troops.

=== Indian Ocean ===
Royal Marines marching after Operation Jurist - British re-occupation of Penang, 3 September 1945, with Queen Emma on the back.

Queen Emma was decommissioned to be adapted for service in tropical waters at Harland & Wolff at Belfast. The works were completed on 29 March 1945, and on 5 May Queen Emma sailed with Convoy KMF-44 for India, arriving at Bombay on the 26th. Queen Emma remained in India until the Japanese surrender in August. She then took part in Operation Jurist – the reoccupation of Penang by British Marines.

She then embarked French troops, and escorted by the Richelieu, sailed to Saigon. On the return trip, Queen Emma was damaged by an acoustic mine. Her main engines were knocked out and the ship had to be towed. However, emergency repairs were made and she reached Singapore under her own power.

After this Queen Emma transported Dutch women and children from Japanese concentration camps, and took British troops to Batavia, Semarang and Soerabaja.

=== Return to the Netherlands ===
In January 1946 the ship was ordered to return to England, arriving at Portsmouth on 6 March 1946. The landing craft, weapons, and other military equipment was removed and on 29 April 1946 the Queen Emma arrived back in her home port of Vlissingen after an absence of six years to be handed back to the Dutch Government. The ship was officially returned to SMZ in early March 1946 and resumed her original name MS Koningin Emma.

Post-war shortages of materials and labour meant that it was 5 March 1948 before Koningin Emma could return to service, sailing for the first time to Harwich from the Hook of Holland. She remained in service on the same route until 1968, when she was replaced by a new generation of roll-on/roll-off ships. The thirty-year-old Koningin Emma was taken out of service and sold for scrap just before the year's end in Antwerp.
