= HMS Princess Beatrix =

Royal Navy commando troop ship of WWII

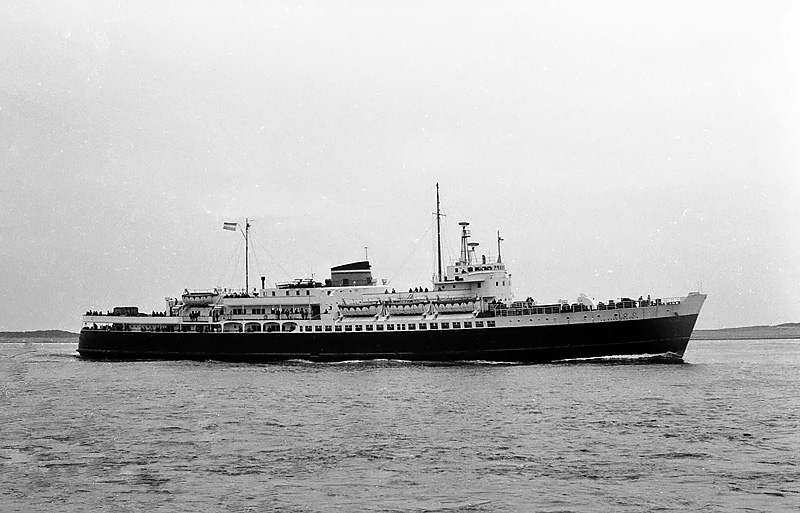
- The Prinses Beatrix in 1948

History

Netherlands
- Name: MS Prinses Beatrix
- Namesake: Princess Beatrix of the Netherlands
- Owner: Stoomvaart Maatschappij Zeeland
- Ordered: December 1937
- Builder: De Schelde, Vlissingen
- Yard number: 210
- Laid down: 7 May 1938
- Launched: 25 March 1939
- In service: 3 July 1939
- Out of service: 1 September 1939
- Fate: Requisitioned by the Ministry of War Transport, 15 May 1940

United Kingdom
- Name: HMS Princess Beatrix
- Acquired: 15 May 1940
- Commissioned: 22 January 1941
- Decommissioned: 16 February 1946
- Honours and awards: Battle honours : Norway; Dieppe; North Africa; Sicily; Salerno; Mediterranean; Anzio; Southern France
- Fate: Returned to the Netherlands, 13 April 1946

Netherlands
- Name: MS Prinses Beatrix
- Acquired: 13 April 1946
- In service: 31 May 1948
- Out of service: 1968
- Fate: Scrapped in Antwerp, 1968

General characteristics (as built)
- Tonnage: 4,135 GRT; 2,100 NRT
- Length: 380 ft (120 m) o/a; 351 ft (107 m) p/p
- Beam: 47 ft (14 m)
- Draught: 13 ft 6 in (4.11 m)
- Decks: 5
- Propulsion: 2 × Sulzer diesel engines, 12,500 shp (9,321 kW)
- Speed: 24.5 knots (45.4 km/h; 28.2 mph)
- Capacity: 1,800 passengers
- Crew: 58
- Armament: As HMS "Princess Beatrix" : 2 × 12-pounder (76 mm) guns; 2 × 2-pounder (40 mm) machine guns; 4 × 20 mm Hotchkiss machine guns; 2 × .303 calibre machine guns

HMS Princess Beatrix was a commando troop ship of the Royal Navy during the Second World War. Built as a civilian passenger liner in 1939, she was named the MS Prinses Beatrix, after Princess Beatrix of the Netherlands, and operated by Stoomvaart Maatschappij Zeeland (SMZ) (The Zealand Steamship Company) between Flushing and Harwich, along with her sister ship, MS Koningin Emma. After fleeing to Britain after the German invasion in 1940, she was requisitioned by the British Ministry of War Transport, renamed HMS Princess Beatrix and converted to a troopship at Harland and Wolff's yard in Belfast. During the war her main role was transporting British Commandos, and she participated in the Lofoten Islands Raid and the Dieppe Raid. She had the advantage of a high speed that allowed hit and run operations. Later designated as a landing ship, infantry (medium) she took part in the landings in North Africa, Sicily, Salerno, Anzio, and southern France. In 1946 Princess Beatrix was returned to her owners and continued to operate as ferry from Hook of Holland until 1969, when she was scrapped in Antwerp, Belgium.

== Construction ==
The MS Prinses Beatrix was ordered by the Zeeland Steamship Company (SMZ) in December 1937 to operate between Vlissingen (Flushing) and Harwich. The keel was laid on 7 May 1938 at the De Schelde shipyard at Vlissingen, and the ship was launched on 25 March 1939 by Prince Bernhard.

During sea trials Prinses Beatrix made more than 24.5 knots (45.4 km/h; 28.2 mph) which was 1.5 knots (2.8 km/h; 1.7 mph) more than was contractually agreed. On 19 May 1939 the ship was handed over to the SMZ. It had a gross register tonnage of 4,135 tons and was capable of carrying 1,800 passengers. Propulsion was provided by two 2-stroke Sulzer diesel engines with a total output of 12,500 shp.

== Service history ==
Prinses Beatrix entered service on 3 July 1939, but after the outbreak of war on 1 September 1939, was withdrawn, and remained in port. On 10 May 1940 the Germans launched their invasion of the Netherlands, dropping mines in the Schelde estuary, and bombing and strafing shipping. Prinses Beatrix promptly fled, arriving at London on the 15th.

=== Troop transport ===
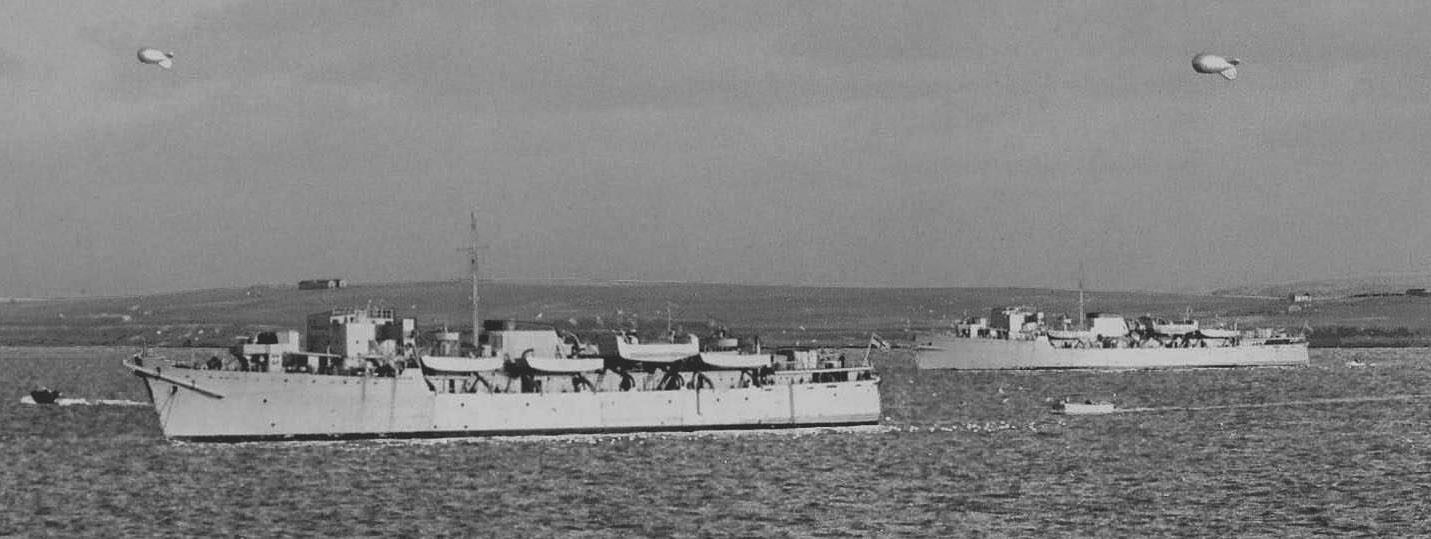
The class was converted to Assault Ships and would see their first action during the evacuation of Dunkirk with their original Dutch crew.

Two days later the British Ministry of War Transport chartered her as a troop transport. She was fitted with "degaussing" coils as protection against German magnetic mines and sailed with her original civilian crew on board in addition to a Dutch Marine detachment.

The ship was ordered to take French troops evacuated to England from Dunkirk back to Brest to continue the fight. She left Plymouth on 2 June and sailed with 2,000 aboard, accompanied by the French corvette Commandant Rivière. They returned the next day, then sailed once more with approximately 1,500 men on board, returning with British troops.

In September 1940 Prinses Beatrix was formally taken over by the Admiralty to be converted into an "assault ship" at the Harland and Wolff shipyard in Belfast. The upper deck was largely cleared and gravity davits installed enabling six LCAs and two LCM(1)s to be carried, along with 450 troops. Prinses Beatrix was armed with two 12-pounder guns, two 2-pounders, four Hotchkiss 20 mm machine guns, and four .303 cal. machine guns. The ship was commissioned as HMS Princess Beatrix on 22 January 1941 as a special service ship.

=== Lofoten Raid ===
Her first major action in her new role was "Operation Claymore", a raid on the Lofoten Islands in northern Norway. On 22 February 1941 Princess Beatrix arrived at Scapa Flow, where men of 3 Commando boarded, as well as Royal Engineer demolition experts and a contingent of Norwegian troops. The British ships - five destroyers and two troop ships - entered the Vestfjord on the morning of 4 March, and launched their attack. Surprise was complete and there was little resistance. All targets selected were located and destroyed. The troops were embarked by 13.00 hours and within half an hour the British had left. After returning to England Princess Beatrix was used for the training and exercise of Special Forces in Scotland.

=== South Atlantic ===
In late 1941 she was selected to join the forces gathered at Freetown, Sierra Leone, for "Operation Pilgrim", the planned occupation of the Canary Islands, if either the Spanish or the Germans captured Gibraltar. After maintenance at Glasgow Princess Beatrix sailed to Freetown, arriving on 5 October 1941. However, it soon became clear that Franco did not plan to join the Axis, nor was he prepared to allow the German troops free passage through Spain to attack Gibraltar, and the operation was cancelled.

On 4 November 1941 the British navy tanker RFA Olwen reported that she had been attacked by a German raider, between Natal, Brazil and Freetown. Princess Beatrix was one of the ships sent to search. No German raider was found and the Admiralty assumed that a German U-boat had shot at the tanker. However, on 22 November the Atlantis was sunk by the British cruiser Devonshire in the southern Atlantic close to Ascension Island, and on 1 December the cruiser Dorsetshire sank the German supply ship Python in the same area. Almost all the crews from both ships were taken aboard German and Italian submarines. The British feared that the Germans would try to land on Ascension and overwhelm the tiny garrison. Princess Beatrix was hurriedly loaded with troops and set sail. However, while en route it was learned that the German crewmen were on their way to Bordeaux and the ship was recalled.

On 14 February 1942 Princess Beatrix left Freetown, and returned to England for refitting, after which she was reclassified as a landing ship, infantry (medium).

=== Dieppe Raid ===
In April 1942 Princess Beatrix was selected to take part in a raid on the French coast at Dieppe. On the evening of 18 August 1942 a fleet of more than 200 ships sailed across the Channel. Princess Beatrix and the British ship Invicta landed men of the South Saskatchewan Regiment on "Green Beach" to the west of Dieppe at Pourville. However, the raid was not a success, and the losses were high. Princess Beatrix sustained slight damage when she collided with the Invicta during operations.

=== Invasion of North Africa ===
After repairs Princess Beatrix was assigned to Training Squadron D based on the Clyde, carrying out exercises with Special Forces and practising the landing of ground troops on enemy beaches. All these exercises were in preparation for the landings in North Africa, "Operation Torch". On 26 October 1942 Princess Beatrix received troops from the 1st Battalion of the U.S. 6th Armored Infantry Regiment, then joined Convoy KMF-1 for North Africa, landing her troops west of Oran.

=== The Moonlight Squadron ===
Princess Beatrix remained in the western Mediterranean, supplying and transporting reinforcements for the First Army. On the evening of Friday, 13 November 1942, Princess Beatrix left Algiers with units of the British 78th Infantry Division for Bône, close to the front line. On the return trip to Algiers she was repeatedly attacked by German aircraft, but made port without damage.

Princess Beatrix, her sister ship HMS Queen Emma and the former Burn & Laird Lines ships Royal Scotsman and Royal Ulsterman became known as the "Moonlight Squadron" for their preference for operating at night. After the fall of Tunis in May 1943 the ships received a special commendation from the Allied Army Commanders and a letter from the British Admiral Andrew Cunningham, the Commander in Chief of the western Mediterranean. During her time in the Mediterranean Princess Beatrix transported 15,700 men, including a large number of German and Italian POWs while sailing 12,000 miles.

=== Invasion of Sicily ===
Princess Beatrix was then attached to the ships of "Operation Husky", the invasion of Sicily. The ship was attached to Force B and sailed with convoy SBF-1. On board were men of the 51st (Highland) Infantry Division and a Special Forces group, which were to raid a beach codenamed Bark South. On 16 August 1943 Princess Beatrix participated in a joint Anglo-American landing at Cape Scarletta, code-named "Operation Blackcock" aimed at Messina.

=== Operations off Italy ===
After the Armistice with Italy was announced on 8 September 1943, Allied troops were rushed from north Africa to the Italian mainland and Princess Beatrix made a number of voyages between Brindisi and Taranto. In the following months she was based at Naples. On 29 December 1943 Princess Beatrix was involved in "Operation Partridge" - a raid at the mouth of the Garigliano River with troops of 9 Commando.

During the Anzio landings on 22 January 1944 Princess Beatrix transported men of the 1st and 3rd Ranger Battalions. Princess Beatrix then sailed to Ferryville, Tunisia, at the end of the month to overhaul her engines.

=== Operations off France ===
After operating around Corsica, supporting occupation operations, Princess Beatrix sailed into the Adriatic Sea, and was the one of first ships to enter Ancona, after it was liberated. After a short stay at the east coast Princess Beatrix moved to the other side of the Italy, to transport French Special Forces on attacks on the French Mediterranean coast in "Operation Romeo".

During the invasion of southern France in August 1944 Princess Beatrix was in convoy CR-1, landing French troops at Cap Nègre between Hyères and Saint-Tropez.

Princess Beatrix then sailed for the UK, arriving at the Clyde on 1 September 1944. In her two years in the Mediterranean she had sailed 42,755 miles and transported 26,142 men, including a large number of POWs, participated in eight landing operations with American, British and French troops aboard, without loss. Only one member of the crew was captured, but was promptly liberated, and returned to the ship eight days later.

=== Indian Ocean ===
Princess Beatrix operated for a time between the Clyde, Avonmouth and Liverpool before she was decommissioned to be adapted for service in tropical waters at D & W Henderson Ltd., Glasgow. She then sailed to the Indian Ocean, arriving at Trincomalee on 15 July 1945. A few days after the Japanese surrender she then took part in "Operation Jurist" - the reoccupation of Penang by British Marines.

Princess Beatrix then acted as troop transport, sailing to Colombo, and taking French troops to Saigon. On 29 September the ship entered the port of Tanjung Priok to take Dutch women and children from Japanese concentration camps. In early January 1946 she was ordered to return home, arriving at Portsmouth on 15 February.

=== Return to the Netherlands ===
Decommissioned the next day, she was disarmed at Greenock, and on 13 April 1946 arrived at her home port of Vlissingen to be returned to the Dutch government. She served as a military transport for a time before being handed back to SMZ, and resumed her original name MS Prinses Beatrix.

Post-war shortages of materials and labour meant that it was 31 May 1948 before Prinses Beatrix could return to service, sailing for the first time to Harwich from the Hook of Holland. She remained in service on the same route until 1968, when she was replaced by a new generation of roll-on/roll-off ships. The thirty-year-old Prinses Beatrix was taken out of service and sold for scrap just before the year's end in Antwerp.
