= Stoomvaart Maatschappij Zeeland =

Stoomvaart Maatschappij Zeeland NV
- Company type: Naamloze vennootschap
- Industry: Passenger transportation Freight transportation
- Founded: 1875
- Defunct: 1989
- Successor: Stena Line BV
- Headquarters: Hook of Holland, Netherlands
- Area served: North Sea

Stoomvaart Maatschappij Zeeland (known as SMZ or in English as Zeeland Steamship Company) was a Dutch ferry operator that ran services from the Netherlands to the United Kingdom between 1875 and 1989.

== History ==
The Stoomvaart Maatschappij Zeeland was founded in June 1875 and opened a service from Vlissingen to Sheerness in Kent on July 26 of that year. However, poor support led to the service being suspended for the following winter and re-opened on May 15, 1876 to nearby Queenborough.

The service was temporarily transferred to Dover in 1882 following a fire at the Queenborough pier.

At the request of the Dutch postal authorities the service was doubled in 1887 but the service suffered further disruption in 1897 due to flooding of the railway to Queenborough and another fire at the pier in 1900.

During this period, competition from the Great Eastern Railway's services to Harwich had grown and forced the company to invest in 3 new vessels from Fairfields of Govan.

In 1911 further new tonnage was introduced and they were placed on a service to Folkestone leaving older paddle steamers to service Queenborough, but as they were retired the operation to that port was ended.

At the outbreak of war in 1914 the service was switched to Tilbury, and following the war in January 1919 a daylight service was introduced to Gravesend.

In 1927 an agreement was reached with the London and North Eastern Railway to switch the service to Harwich, and that agreement was further enhanced in 1946 after World War II when services were moved to the Hook of Holland, the company's facilities at Flushing having been destroyed during the hostilities.

A secondary service from Vlissingen to Folkestone was introduced in 1949 but lasted only three seasons.

In the meantime, British Railways had taken over from the LNER at Harwich in 1948 and the service evolved to a full co-operation, the two companies providing the night [B.R.] and day [Zeeland] services respectively employing four ships plus two relief vessels.

In 1968 with the introduction of car ferries, the SMZ and Sealink services were fully amalgamated.

In 1988 the Dutch government announced their intention to sell their 70 per cent holding in SMZ and in preparation the services were rebranded as Crown Line the following year. Bidders included Sealink British Ferries, Nedlloyd (part owners of North Sea Ferries and Johnson Line (owners of Sally Line, but ultimately it was the Swedish ferry operator Stena Line who acquired SMZ in June 1989. Stena rebranded the service under their name and withdrew SMZ from the Sealink consortium.

The following year Stena Line also acquired SMZ's UK partner Sealink. The Harwich operations of Sealink were transferred to Stena Line BV.

== Fleet ==
=== Passenger ships ===
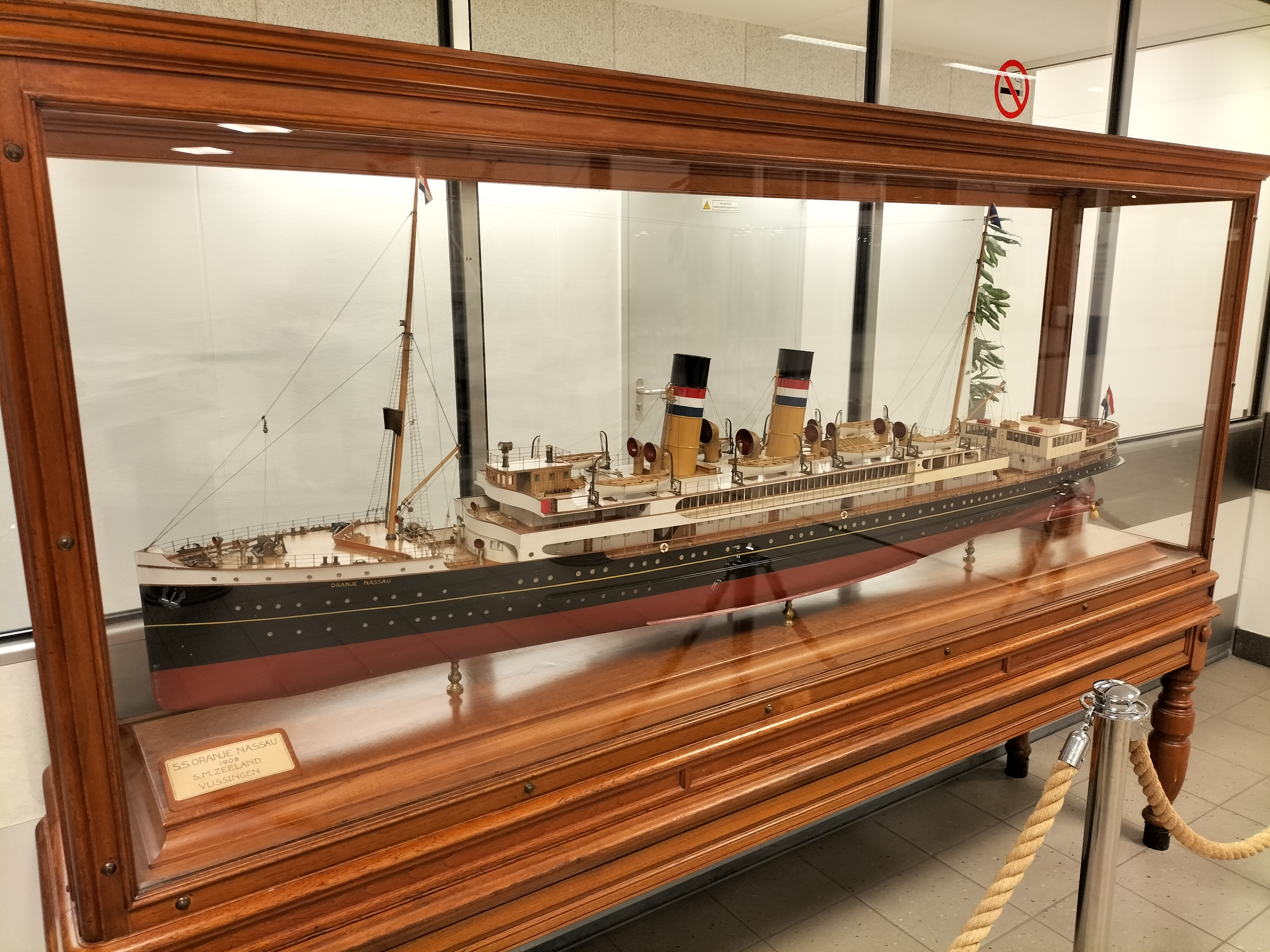
Model of SS Oranje Nassau in the Stena Line ferry terminal at Hook of Holland

- PS Stad Middleburg (built 1865) - renamed Aurora in 1881 - Sold 1888.
- PS Stad Vlissingen (built 1865) - Lost 1879.
- PS Stad Breda (built 1863) - Broken up 1888.
- PS Prinses Elisabeth (built 1877) - Sold 1898 to Swedish interests.
- PS Prinses Marie (built 1877) - Sold 1898 to German interests.
- PS Prins Hendrik (built 1880) - Sold in 1902 to German interests for breaking up.
- PS Willem Prins Van Orange (built 1883) - Broken up 1909.
- PS Duitschland (built 1886) - renamed Zeeland in 1914 - Broken up 1922.
- PS Engeland (built 1887) - Broken up 1910.
- PS Nederland (built 1887) - Broken up 1910.
- PS Koningin Wilhelmina (built 1895) - Lost in 1916 after hitting a mine.
- PS Konigin Regentes (built 1895) - Torpedoed and lost in 1918.
- PS Prins Hendrick (built 1895) - Broken up in 1922.
- SS Prinses Juliana (built 1909) - Hit a mine and subsequently broke up in 1916.
- SS Oranje Nassau (built 1909) - Broken up 1952.
- SS Mecklenburg (built 1909) - Sank 1916 after hitting a mine.
- SS Prinses Juliana (built 1919) - Broke up on beach following bombing 1940.
- SS Mecklenburg (built 1922) - Broken up 1960.
- MS Prinses Beatrix (built 1939) - Broken up 1968.
- MS Koningin Emma (built 1939) - Broken up 1968.
- MS Koningin Wilhelmina (built 1960) - sold to Ventouris Ferries in 1978 for further service in Greece.

=== Car ferries ===
- MS Koningin Juliana (built 1968) - sold to Moby Lines in 1985.
- MS Zeeland (built 1972) - Chartered 1984 - 1986 from Larvik Line where named Peter Wessel.
- MS Prinses Beatrix (built 1978) - sold to Brittany Ferries in 1985.
- MS Koningin Beatrix (built 1986) - sold to Stena Line BV in 1988.

=== Cargo ships ===
- Domburgh (built 1949) - lengthened 1962 and re-built as 77 twenty-foot equivalent unit container vessel - chartered by SMZ from W.H.Muller and Co (Batavier) N.V. in 1968 for joint container service Harwich-Rotterdam. Charter ended in 1972.
