= Stena Line Holland BV =

Subsidiary of ferry company Stena Line

Stena Line Holland BV is a subsidiary of Stena Line that operates ferry routes between Harwich and Killingholme on the east coast of England and Hook of Holland and Europort in the Netherlands. The head office is in Hook of Holland in the Netherlands. Apart from during the two world wars there has been a continuous service operating between these two countries since the late 19th century. This service was originally run by the railway companies serving the east coast of England together with Stoomvaart Maatschappij Zeeland a Dutch ferry company. In 1990 Stena Line had purchased both parts and Stena Line Holland BV came into being. Current sailing times are around 5.5 to 8 hours for the day service and 8.5 to 9 hours for the night service.

== Hook of Holland – Harwich ==
A passenger service has operated from Harwich to Hook of Holland since the late 19th century apart from a break during the Second World War. Until 1990, the route was operated by two companies: one British and the other Dutch; but since then, Stena Line BV has been operating this route.

=== History of the route ===
In the late 19th century, the Great Eastern Railway (GER), wishing to compete with its rivals who were operating from the Kent coast to France and Belgium, obtained the rights to provide a cargo and cattle service to Rotterdam. After first using chartered tonnage they carried passengers with the paddle steamer Zealous 613 gt, built in 1864 on the Thames by J & W Dudgeon. Dudgeon also supplied the 1865 built Avalon, 670 gt, which was powered by a two-cylinder oscillating engine that gave a speed of 14 knots.

When the service first started, ships bound for Rotterdam had to negotiate the Brielle Bar to enter the river Maas with access possible only at high water. Things improved in 1872 with the opening of the New Waterway which by-passed the Brielle Bar. The Great Eastern paddle steamer, Richard Young, was the first seagoing vessel to use the direct link to the city.

In 1883, the Great Eastern Railway moved its English base from Harwich town to Parkeston Quay and in 1893 moved its Dutch operations from Rotterdam to the new rail terminus at the Hook of Holland. The first vessel to call at the "Hook" was the steamer Cambridge built in 1886 of 1,194 gt.

In 1893, the GER built the twin-screw Chelmsford to open a new night service. The new terminal in the Hook was situated on the north western end of the New Waterway and this saved two hours on the passage to Rotterdam itself. The new route enabled passengers to leave London in the evening and, after arrival in the Hook before 6 am, be in Amsterdam at breakfast time and reach Berlin by the end of the day.

The service quickly became popular, and GER used three ships to offer night sailings each way, every day except Saturday. By 1904, the GER had ceased operations to Rotterdam. The Dutch had their own services from Flushing, which was operated by Stoomvaart Maatschappij Zeeland (SMZ) which was created in 1875, which ran firstly to Queenborough near Sheerness and then to Folkestone.

On 1 January 1923 after the enforced re-grouping of the railway companies, the route came under the control of the London and North Eastern Railway.

In 1926, SMZ moved its English port to Harwich providing day sailings but did not start using the Hook of Holland until after the Second World War. After both World Wars, the Hook became a major port for troop movements, these operations continuing until 1961.

Post Second World War vessels on this route included the John Brown built Arnhem (1946). On 1 January 1948, after the nationalising of the British railway network, the route came under the control of British Railways. In 1950, the Amsterdam, also built by John Brown, came into service; in 1963, the elegant Avalon was built for this route. SMZ added the motor ship the Koningin Wilhelmina in 1960.

In 1968, the two Ro-Ro passenger vessels (the British-owned St George and the Dutch-owned Koningin Juliana) came into service, the St George in July and the Koningin Juliana in October. This fully integrated service was operated from November 1968 under the Sealink banner with each ship leaving port by day and returning overnight.

In 1984, Sealink was bought by Sea Containers who continued to operate the British operations under the Sealink name. In 1989, SMZ was acquired by Stena Line and in 1990 Stena bought Sealink, thus for the first time, the Dutch and British operations were under the same ownership.

=== Operation under Stena BV ===
In 1990, when Stena Line took control of the route, the Harwich to Hook of Holland service was being operated with two passenger and one freight Ro-Ro vessels. This continued until 2 June 1997, when with the introduction of the high speed ferry Stena Discovery, the two conventional ferries were taken off the route and an additional freight ferry was introduced.

Since 1996, Stena Line, in conjunction with Anglia Railways and its successors (currently Abellio Greater Anglia) in the United Kingdom and Nederlandse Spoorwegen, the Netherlands Railways, has been operating the integrated Dutchflyer service (named Go-London in the Netherlands), a rail/sea link between London and Amsterdam.

In June 2006, Stena Line announced that the high-speed catamaran ferry, would be withdrawn from service on 8 January 2007. It had been carrying the majority of the passenger traffic on the Hook of Holland–Harwich route. This service was halted due to the excessive cost of operating the ship and competition from the budget airlines. The ferry consumed 180,000 litres of high grade fuel daily whilst doing its four crossings at speeds of up to 45 knots, about 75 kilometres per hour.

After the Stena Discovery was removed from service on the Hook of Holland – Harwich route, she was laid up in Belfast. In 2010 she was sold to Venezuelan interests.

To replace the Stena Discovery, Stena Line invested 100 million euro in rebuilding the existing ferries of the route. The Ro-Pax vessels were both lengthened and converted at the Lloyd Werft shipyard in Bremerhaven so that they could carry additional passengers. Both ships are now 240 metres long, the Stena Britannica being lengthened by 28 metres and the Stena Hollandica by 52 metres. The Stena Britannica returned to service on 12 March 2007 and the Stena Hollandica on 14 May 2007.

In November 2006, Stena Line ordered two new vessels to be built at Aker Yards (now STX Europe) in Germany, to replace the Stena Britannica and Stena Hollandica. These vessels, which are now in service, are the biggest in Stena Line's fleet so far. They were delivered in May and October 2010.

=== Ships that have operated between Harwich and Rotterdam or Hook of Holland ===
==== Ships of the Great Eastern Railway ====
Ship's name	Entered service	Ended service	Gross Tonnage	Type of Vessel
Avalon	13 June 1864	1866	613	Paddle steamer
Zealous	1 August 1864	1887	613	Paddle steamer
Harwich	1864	October 1907	750	Paddle steamer
Rotterdam	1864	1908	757	Paddle steamer
Avalon	1865	Before 1906	670	Paddle steamer
Ravensbury	1865	Wrecked; 5 March 1870	621	Paddle steamer
Great Yarmouth	1866	1872	731	Single Screw; Steamer
Richard Young	March 1871	1890	718	Paddle Steamer
Pacific	1872	1887	712	Paddle Steamer
Claud Hamilton	14 August 1875	1897	962	Paddle Steamer
Princess of Wales	6 July 1878	1894	1098	Paddle Steamer
Lady Tyler	29 May 1880	1893	951	Paddle Steamer
Adelaide	23 July 1880	1896	927	Paddle Steamer
Norwich	24 July 1883	1911	1037	Twin Screw Steamer
Ipswich	23 October 1883	1905	1037	Twin Screw Steamer
Cambridge	12 February 1887	25 November 1912	1160	Twin Screw Steamer
Colchester	27 February 1889	8 March 1916	1160	Twin Screw Steamer
Chelmsford	31 May 1893	June 1910	1635	Twin Screw Steamer
Berlin	10 January 1894	Wrecked; 21 February 1907	1745	Twin Screw Steamer
Amsterdam	9 May 1894	December 1928	1745	Twin Screw Steamer
Vienna	11 October 1894	23 March 1930	1753	Twin Screw Steamer
Dresden	29 June 1897	20 January 1918; Sunk by UC 22	1805	Twin Screw Steamer
Cromer	22 April 1902	30 August 1934	812	Twin Screw; Cargo Steamer
Brussels	19 June 1902	23 June 1916; Captured	1380	Twin Screw Steamer
Yarmouth	1903	27 October 1908; Lost at sea	806	Twin Screw; Cargo Steamer
Clacton	7 February 1905	7 October 1914; Requisitioned	820	Twin Screw; Cargo Steamer
Newmarket	August 1907	8 October 1914; Requisitioned	833	Twin Screw; Cargo Steamer
Copenhagen	27 January 1907	October 1914; Requisitioned	2570	Triple Screw; Steamer
Munich	16 November 1908	10 May 1940; Ship Scuttled	2410	Triple Screw; Steamer
St Petersburg	7 July 1910	10 December 1939; Requisitioned	2448	Triple Screw; Steamer
Felixstowe	April 1919	10 February 1951	892	Single Screw; Cargo Steamer
Frinton	6 November 1919	19 July 1929	1361	Single Screw Steamer
St George	June 1919	16 July 1929	2676	Triple Screw; Steamer
Antwerp	June 1920	1 May 1950	2957	Twin Screw Steamer
Bruges	27 September 1920	9 September 1940; Requisitioned	2949	Twin Screw Steamer
Malines	17 March 1921	10 May 1940	2969	Twin Screw Steamer

==== Ships of the London and North Eastern Railway and British Railways ====
Ship's name	Date entered service	Date withdrawn	Tonnage	Type of Ship
Sheringham	15 September 1926	June 1940	1088	Single Screw Steamer
	23 March 1946	25 October 1958		
Vienna	15 July 1929	24 August 1939	4227	Twin Screw Steamer
	1 August 1945	2 July 1960		
Prague	1930	1 September 1939	4220	Twin Screw Steamer
	14 November 1945	24 December 1947		
Amsterdam	1930	1 September 1939	4218	Twin Screw Steamer
Arnhem	26 May 1947	27 April 1968	4891	Twin Screw Steamer
Duke of York	31 May 1948	19 July 1963	4325	Twin Screw Steamer
Amsterdam	10 June 1950	7 November 1968	5092	Twin Screw Steamer
Avalon	25 July 1963	31 August 1974	6584	Twin Screw Steamer
Seafreightliner I	17 May 1968	30 July 1986	4043	Twin Screw Motor; Container Ship
Seafreightliner II	24 June 1968	1 August 1986	4034	Twin Screw Motor; Container Ship
St George	17 July 1968	5 June 1983	7356	Twin Screw Ro-Ro Motorship
St Edmund	19 January 1975	12 May 1982	8987	Twin Screw Ro-Ro Motorship
Prins Oberon	12 March 1983	10 June 1983	7993	Twin Screw Ro-Ro Motorship
St Nicholas	10 June 1983	19 June 1991	17043	Twin Screw Ro-Ro Motorship

==== Ships operated by Zeeland Steamship Company (SMZ) ====
Ship's name	Date entered service	Date withdrawn	Tonnage	Type of Ship
Oranje Nassau	27 August 1945	July 1954	3053	Twin Screw Steamer
Mecklenburg	21 November 1945	25 October 1959	2907	Twin Screw Steamer
Koningin Emma	5 March 1948	December 1968	4353	Twin Screw Motorship
Prinses Beatrix	31 May 1948	September 1968	4353	Twin Screw Motorship
Koningin Wilhelmina	7 February 1960	1 July 1978	6228	Twin Screw Motorship
Koningin Juliana	17 October 1968	8 April 1984	6682	Twin Screw Ro-Ro Motorship
Prinses Beatrix	29 June 1978	May 1986	9356	Twin Screw Ro-Ro Motorship
Prins Oberon	11 February 1983	11 March 1983	7993	Twin Screw Ro-Ro Motorship
Zeeland	1 April 1984	25 March 1986	6801	Twin Screw Ro-Ro Motorship
Armorique	25 March 1986	16 April 1986	5731	Twin Screw Ro-Ro Motorship
Koningin Beatrix	16 April 1986	2 June 1997	31189	Twin Screw Ro-Ro Motorship
Duchess Anne	January 1989	February 1989	9796	Twin Screw Ro-Ro Motorship

==== Ships operated by Stena Line BV ====
Ship's name	Date entered service	Date withdrawn	Tonnage	Remarks
Stena Britannica	19 June 1991	3 March 1994	25,905	Now named Stena Saga
Stena Seatrader	2 May 1990	March 2001	17,991	Sold to Ventouris Ferries, renamed Seatrader
Stena Europe	4 March 1994	1 June 1997	14,378	Now on the Fishguard to Rosslare route
Stena Searider	2 May 1997	October 2000	21,019	
Stena Discovery	2 June 1997	8 January 2007	19,638	Sold to Venezuelan interests
Rosebay	8 June 1998	3 October 2000	5,631	Now named Translandia for Eckerö Line
Stena Britannica	12 October 2000	25 February 2003	29,841	Now named Finnfellow
Stena Hollandica	9 March 2001	8 May 2010	29,841	Vessel lengthened in 2007. New tonnage 44,237
Stena Britannica	25 February 2003	8 October 2010	43,487	Vessel lengthened in 2007. New tonnage 55,050
Stena Hollandica	16 May 2010	Still in service	64,039	
Stena Britannica	9 October 2010	Still in service	64,039	

== Hook of Holland – Killingholme ==
This route was inaugurated on 8 October 2000 using two old freight RoRo ferries, the Stena Searider, built in 1969, and the Stena Seatrader, built in 1973. The success of this route encouraged a further 200 million euro investment in two replacement ferries for this service. The first vessel, the Stena Trader replaced the Stena Seatrader and commenced operating on 12 August 2006 and the second vessel, the Stena Traveller went into service on 20 June 2007 replacing the Stena Searider.
On 21 May 2010 it was announced that the Stena Trader and Stena Traveller would leave on a five-year charter to the Canadian company, Marine Atlantic, to sail between Nova Scotia and Newfoundland. Two larger vessels, the Stena Transporter and Stena Transit had already been ordered from Samsung in South Korea as replacements, but would not be ready until 2011. To cover the gap two vessels, the Finnarrow and the Coraggio, were chartered. The first of the new vessels, the Stena Transporter, took over from the Finnarrow on 1 March 2011. The second vessel, the Stena Transit, is due in October 2011.

Vessels that have operated on the Hook of Holland to Killingholme route

Ship's name	Date entered service	Date withdrawn	Tonnage	Remarks
Rosebay	8 October 2000	9 March 2001	5631	
Stena Searider	8 October 2000	18 June 2007	20914	
Stena Seatrader	14 March 2001	11 August 2006	17991	
Stena Trader	12 August 2006	30 September 2010	26660	
Stena Traveller	20 June 2007	9 December 2010	26660	
Corragio	30 September 2010	6 November 2011	24950	
Finnarrow	9 December 2010	28 February 2011	25996	
Stena Transporter	1 March 2011	Still in service	33690	
Stena Transit	7 November 2011	Still in service	33690	

== Rotterdam (Europoort) – Harwich ==
This route is descended from the Felixstowe to Europort route that was operated by Townsend Thoresen. In 1987 Townsend Thoresen were taken over by P&O Ferries who in turn sold the route in 2002 to Stena who then moved the British end of the operation to Harwich.
