= HMS Royal Scotsman =

Royal Navy ship turned Scientology flagship

History

United Kingdom
- Name: Royal Scotsman
- Builder: Harland and Wolff, Belfast
- Yard number: 964
- Launched: 11 March 1936
- Completed: 29 May 1936
- Acquired: October 1940
- Identification: IMO number: 5301394
- Honours and awards: Atlantic 1942; Sicily 1943; North Africa 1942–43; Salerno 1943
- Fate: Returned to owner, March 1945.; Sold 1967, 1977, and 1978, sunk after train collision in 1980.

General characteristics
- Type: Landing Ship, Infantry
- Tonnage: 3,244 gross register tons (GRT)
- Length: 340 ft (100 m) o/a
- Beam: 48 ft (15 m)
- Draught: 17 ft (5.2 m) (deep)
- Propulsion: 7,500 shp (5,593 kW) twin diesel engines
- Troops: 830
- Complement: 236
- Armament: 1 × 12-pounder gun; 4 × 20 mm guns

HMS Royal Scotsman, originally the MV Royal Scotsman, was a landing ship, infantry of the Royal Navy that served during World War II. A former passenger ferry, she saw action in the Mediterranean during the invasions of North Africa (Operation Torch), Sicily and Italy.

The ship was later purchased in 1967 by the Church of Scientology, re-registered to Sierra Leone and renamed to the MV Royal Scotman (due to a transcription error) and then MV Apollo. It served as the headquarters of the Church of Scientology, the founding flagship of the Sea Org, and the personal residence of L. Ron Hubbard until 1975.

== Construction ==
The ship was built by Harland and Wolff, at Belfast, for the Burns and Laird Lines as Yard No. 964. Launched on 11 March 1936, the ship was completed on 29 May 1936, and entered service as MV Royal Scotsman as a passenger and cattle ferry in the Irish Sea, operating between Belfast and Glasgow.

== Operational history ==
At 09:30 on 5 May 1940 Royal Scotsman left Gourock to transport Force HQ and the 3rd Independent Company to Bodø in Norway as part of "Scissorsforce", which was tasked with preventing the Germans from occupying Bodø, Mo and Mosjøen. They arrived off Bodø on 8th May but rough sea and poor visibility made a landing impossible, and the ship lay off until the weather improved, finally berthing at 22:00 on 9th May. Owing to the danger of air attack, disembarkation and unloading were carried out as quickly as possible and were completed by 02:00 on 10 May, when the Royal Scotsman departed.

Royal Scotsman was then requisitioned by the Admiralty in October 1940, and in January 1941 she prepared for operational service. Most of the ship's company were the original merchant crew who had joined the Navy under T124X engagements (which meant that they could not be transferred to a combat ship), while the captain and some specialist officers were from the Royal Navy or Reservists.

Initially deployed in home waters, in August 1941, she embarked troops at the Clyde for "Operation Grey", a planned occupation of the Azores. After sailing to Scapa Flow to join military convoy WS-8C, the operation was cancelled, and Royal Scotsman returned to the Clyde. On 17 September 1941, she joined military convoy WS-11X in the Clyde, to transport military personnel to Gibraltar, as reinforcements for Malta ("Operation Halberd"), returning to the UK, in October, to train with Combined Operations personnel.

From January 1942, she took part in extensive exercises for amphibious operations, and on 26 October, sailed to Gibraltar, as part of military convoy KMF-1 for the invasion of North Africa, in "Operation Torch". In the early hours of 8 November, she landed men of the American 1st Ranger Battalion to capture the port of Arzew, and then was deployed to transport troops and equipment in the western Mediterranean, operating with her sister ship Royal Ulsterman, and the Dutch ships Princess Beatrix and Queen Emma.

In May 1943, she took part in landings on the Italian island of Pantelleria ("Operation Corkscrew"), then on 10 July, landed troops on the beach codenamed "Bark South" during the Allied invasion of Sicily. In September, she sailed to Tripoli, to embark troops, and joined military convoy TSF-1 to land troops at Salerno, on 9 September. In November 1943, she returned to the UK.

There is no record of her being deployed in any further operations, though whether the ship was damaged or only used for training purposes is unknown. In February 1945, she was decommissioned and returned to her original owners in March.

== Scientology ==
She remained in service with Burns & Laird, until 1967, when she was purchased by the Church of Scientology and renamed Apollo, to serve as flagship of the Sea Org, as well as the residence of Scientology founder L. Ron Hubbard and his family. (Coincidentally, Apollo was of a similar ship type to the USS Algol, an amphibious cargo ship which Hubbard served on from December 1943 to September 1944.) She cruised mostly in the Mediterranean Sea and on the Atlantic coasts of Europe and Africa. Apollo served as the headquarters of the Church of Scientology until the church established its headquarters in Clearwater, Florida, in 1975.

== After Scientology and fate ==
After the Sea Org moved to Clearwater, the ship sat dormant until it was eventually sold in 1977 to Consolidated-Andy Inc., a shipbreaking firm in Brownsville, Texas. Though initially planned to be turned it into a floating restaurant, the ship was sold again in 1978 to Zanzibar Shipping who rechristened it the Arctic Star. The ship remained docked at port until September 16, 1980, when a train operated by the Missouri Pacific Railroad Company jumped its tracks and struck the ship, sinking it.
