= SS Norwich =

British steamship

History
- Name: TSS Norwich
- Operator: 1885–1905: Great Eastern Railway; 1905–????: Channel Drydock and Shipbuilding Company
- Port of registry: (United Kingdom)
- Builder: Earle's Shipbuilding, Hull
- Launched: 6 March 1883
- Out of service: 1921
- Fate: Sunk 1921

General characteristics
- Tonnage: 1,062 gross register tons (GRT)
- Length: 260 feet (79 m)
- Beam: 31.4 feet (9.6 m)
- Depth: 15 feet (4.6 m)

TSS Norwich was a passenger vessel built for the Great Eastern Railway in 1883.

== History ==
The ship was built by Earle's Shipbuilding of Hull for the Great Eastern Railway and launched on 6 March 1883. She was one of a pair of new steamers ordered by the Great Eastern Railway, the other being Ipswich. She was launched by the Mayoress of Norwich.

She was placed on the Harwich to Rotterdam and Antwerp route.

She was withdrawn from service in 1905 and sold in 1906 to the Channel Drydock and Shipbuilding Company. After a succession of subsequent ownership in Cape Verde, Montevideo, New York and Mexico, she sank in 1921 when under the ownership of the Mexican Fruit and Steamship Company.
