= SS Ipswich =

History
- Name: TSS Ipswich
- Operator: 1885–1905: Great Eastern Railway; 1905–1909: Shah Steam Navigation Company, Bombay
- Port of registry: (United Kingdom)
- Builder: Earle's Shipbuilding, Hull
- Launched: 21 May 1883
- Out of service: 1909
- Fate: Scrapped 1909

General characteristics
- Type: Twin-screw steamer
- Tonnage: 1,037 gross register tons (GRT)
- Length: 260.2 feet (79.3 m)
- Beam: 31.3 feet (9.5 m)
- Depth: 15 feet (4.6 m)

TSS Ipswich was a passenger vessel built for the Great Eastern Railway in 1883.

== History ==
The ship was built by Earle's Shipbuilding of Hull for the Great Eastern Railway and launched on 21 May 1883. She was one of a pair of new steamers ordered by the Great Eastern Railway, the other being Norwich. She was launched by the Mayoress of Ipswich. She was described in the Essex Standard on 26 May 1883.

She is built of iron, and will be rigged as a fore-and-aft schooner, with two pole masts; and, having fine lines, she will have a very smart and pleasing appearance, besides being in other respects a most valuable additions to the Great Eastern Railway Company’s fleet. The comford and convenience of passengers have been studied in every way. The saloons and state rooms will be superbly fitted, and the ventilation, lavatories, &c., have been provided on a most ample scale. The accommodation for first-class passengers, 84 in number, is arranged under a long bridge amidships and forward of the engine and boiler space, and for the passengers the bridge deck will afford a spacious promenade. The second-class, 42 in number, will have their accommodation under the poop aft, with ample promenade space on the poop deck. The first-class saloon and state rooms, ladies’ cabin, engine room, &c., are to be lighted by electricity. The upper deck is almost entirely covered by the long poop, bridge and top-gallant forecastle, only a small space or well deck being reserved between each of these for working cargo. The engines which are designed to drive the vessel at a speed of 14 knots, are of the condensing type. Each pair of engines has cylinders 30 inches and 57 inches diameter, by 36 inches stroke, and expected to indicate 1,600 horse-power collectively. Steam will be supplied by two double-ended boilers, 13 feet diameter by 18 feet 3 inches long, at a working pressure of 80lb per square inch. Both the hull and engines have been constructed by Earles’ Company, under the superintendence of the Great Eastern Railway’s Consulting Engineer, Mr. W.G. Ramsden of Liverpool.

She was placed on the Harwich to Rotterdam and Antwerp route.

She was withdrawn from service in 1905 and sold in 1906 to the Shah Steam Navigation Company, Bombay and scrapped in 1909.
