= RFA Olwen =

Two ships of the Royal Fleet Auxiliary have borne the name RFA Olwen:

- RFA Olwen was an oiler launched in 1917 as RFA British Light. She was renamed RFA Olwen in 1937 and was sold in 1947.
- RFA Olwen (A122) was an oiler launched in 1964 as RFA Olynthus. She was renamed RFA Olwen in 1967 and was sold in 2001.
