= HMS Royal Ulsterman =

1936 passenger ship

History

United Kingdom
- Name: HMS Royal Ulsterman
- Builder: Harland & Wolff, Belfast
- Yard number: 964
- Launched: 10 March 1936
- Completed: 29 May 1936
- Fate: Sunk by limpet mine, 1973

General characteristics
- Tonnage: 3,250 tons (gross)
- Length: 328 ft (100 m) (pp) 339 ft 6 in (103.48 m) (oa)
- Beam: 47 ft 9 in (14.55 m)
- Draught: 14 ft (4.3 m)
- Propulsion: 2-shaft Diesel BHP 7,500
- Speed: 16 knots (30 km/h)
- Capacity: 830 troops, six LCAs
- Complement: 236
- Armament: 1 × 12-pdr AA, 5 × 20 mm AA

Completed in 1936, HMS Royal Ulsterman was a 3,250 ton passenger ship which, along with her sister-ship, Royal Scotsman, sailed the Glasgow-Belfast run for Burns and Laird Lines Ltd. During the Second World War, Royal Ulsterman served as a commissioned Royal Navy troop transport, taking part in nearly all of the major Allied amphibious operations of the European war, including the Dunkirk evacuation; Operation Neptune (the amphibious part of the D-Day landings); and the liberation of the Channel Islands.

== Wartime Service ==
=== Operations off Norway ===
Commissioned HMS, Royal Ulsterman landed elements of the British Expeditionary Force for operations in Norway in 1940. Subsequently, the ship delivered armaments to Harstad, high above the Arctic Circle.

=== Evacuation of the BEF from France ===
On 18 June, Royal Ulsterman embarked some 2,800 troops and three civilian women at St. Nazaire, transporting them to Falmouth in Cornwall. By the end of August, she had also moved French personnel to Casablanca, carried civilian refugees from the Mediterranean region to Glasgow, and landed some 700 troops at Iceland. Over the next year, Ulsterman would make regular trips between the British Isles and Iceland. During one of these runs, Ulsterman, carried the three survivors of HMS Hood (the British battlecruiser sunk by the German battleship Bismarck), back to the UK.

On 29 August 1941, off the west coast of Scotland, Ulsterman was holed in a collision with the destroyer HMS St. Mary's, requiring repairs on the Mersey until late September.

=== Operation Ironclad ===
Ulsterman took part in Operation Ironclad (the battle of Madagascar), landing elements at Diego Suarez on 5 May 1942.

=== Operation Torch ===
Ulsterman took part in Operation Torch (the Allied invasion of North Africa), landing United States Army Rangers of the 1st Battalion on the Algerian coast on 8 November 1942. On 14 November, while ferrying troops from Oran to Algiers, the ship was attacked, unsuccessfully, by five Luftwaffe aircraft.

=== Operations Husky and Avalanche ===
On 10 July 1943, Royal Ulsterman disembarked troops of the British 8th Army in Sicily for Operation Husky. She subsequently took part in Operation Avalanche, landing troops on 9 September 1943 at Salerno on the Italian mainland.

=== Operation Neptune ===
After a two-month-long refit at Southampton in March and April 1944, Royal Ulsterman took part in Operation Neptune, the amphibious operation that launched Operation Overlord, the Allied invasion of Normandy on 6 June 1944. The ship disembarked troops of the 9th brigade of the 3rd Canadian Infantry Division on Juno Beach.

=== Liberation of the Channel Islands ===
Seized by the Germans in 1940, the Channel Islands were the only part of the British Isles to be occupied by the enemy during the Second World War. Not until after Germany's surrender were the islands liberated. Royal Ulsterman landed British troops on Jersey on 11 May 1945 and provided additional reinforcements on 18 May.

== Postwar history ==
Royal Ulsterman returned to Belfast in November 1945 and was paid off on 20 December. After reconditioning, she resumed work on the Glasgow-Belfast run for Burns and Laird. She served in this capacity until 1967. Serving with Mediterranean Link Lines of Famagusta (renamed Sounion), she sank at the pier in Beirut on 3 March 1973 after a sabotage operation, and was subsequently scrapped.

== Bibliography ==
- Lenton, H.T. & Colledge, J. J. Warships of World War II, Ian Allan, London, 1973. ISBN 0-7110-0403-X
