= Bethlehem Staten Island =

Staten Island, New York American shipyard company

Coordinates: 40.639118°N 74.162221°W

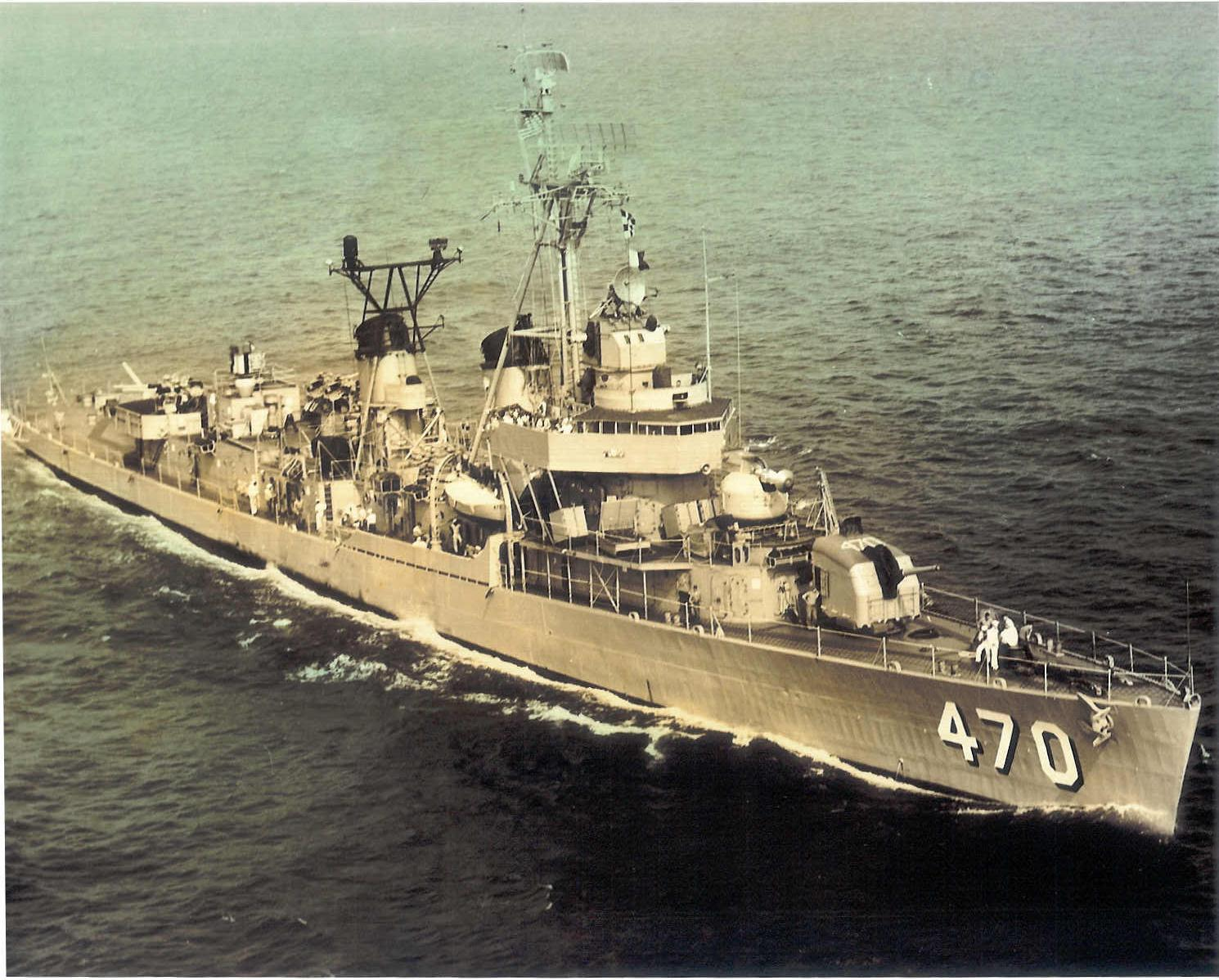
USS Bache, Bethlehem Staten Island first Fletcher-class destroyer built in 1942

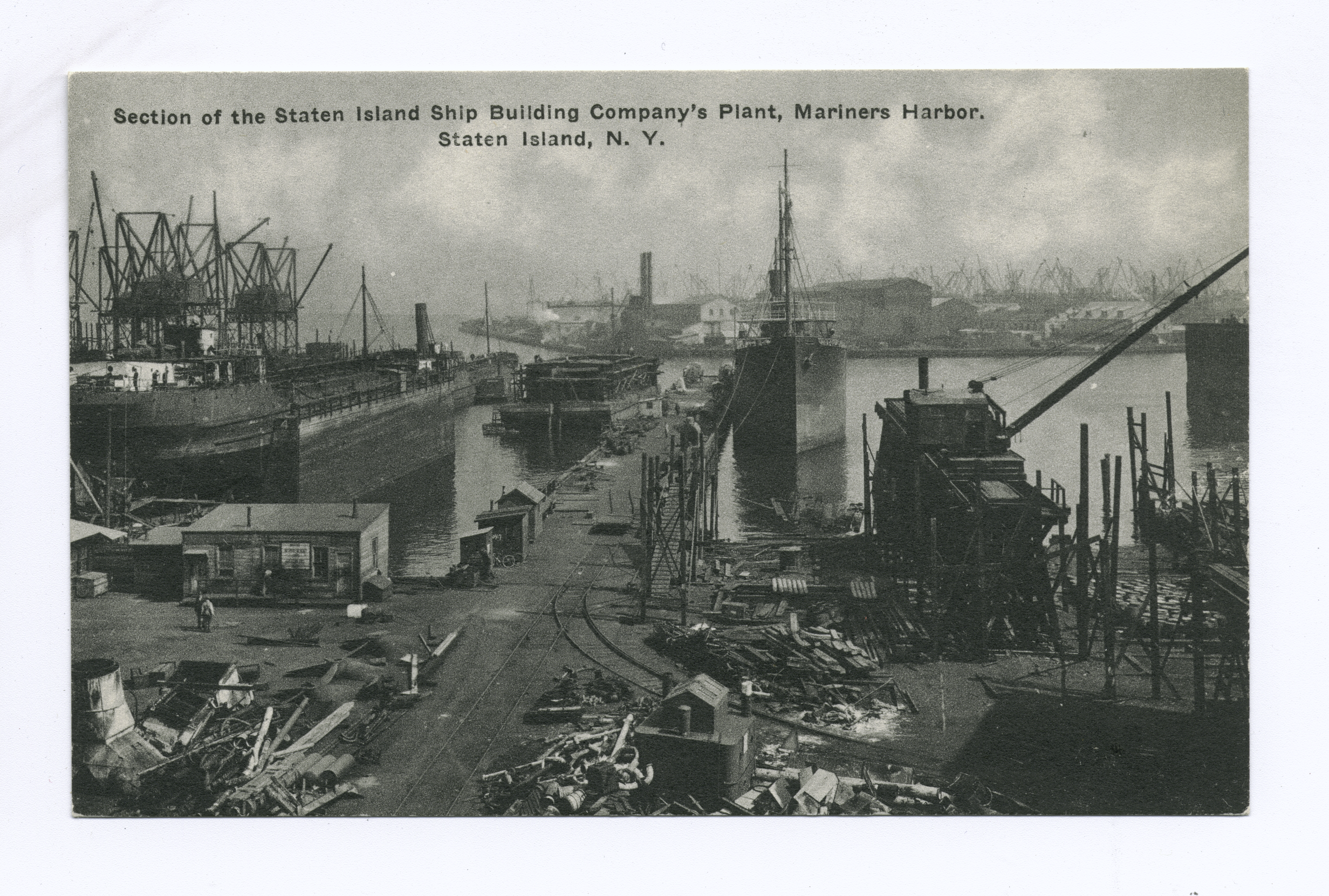
Staten Island Shipbuilding

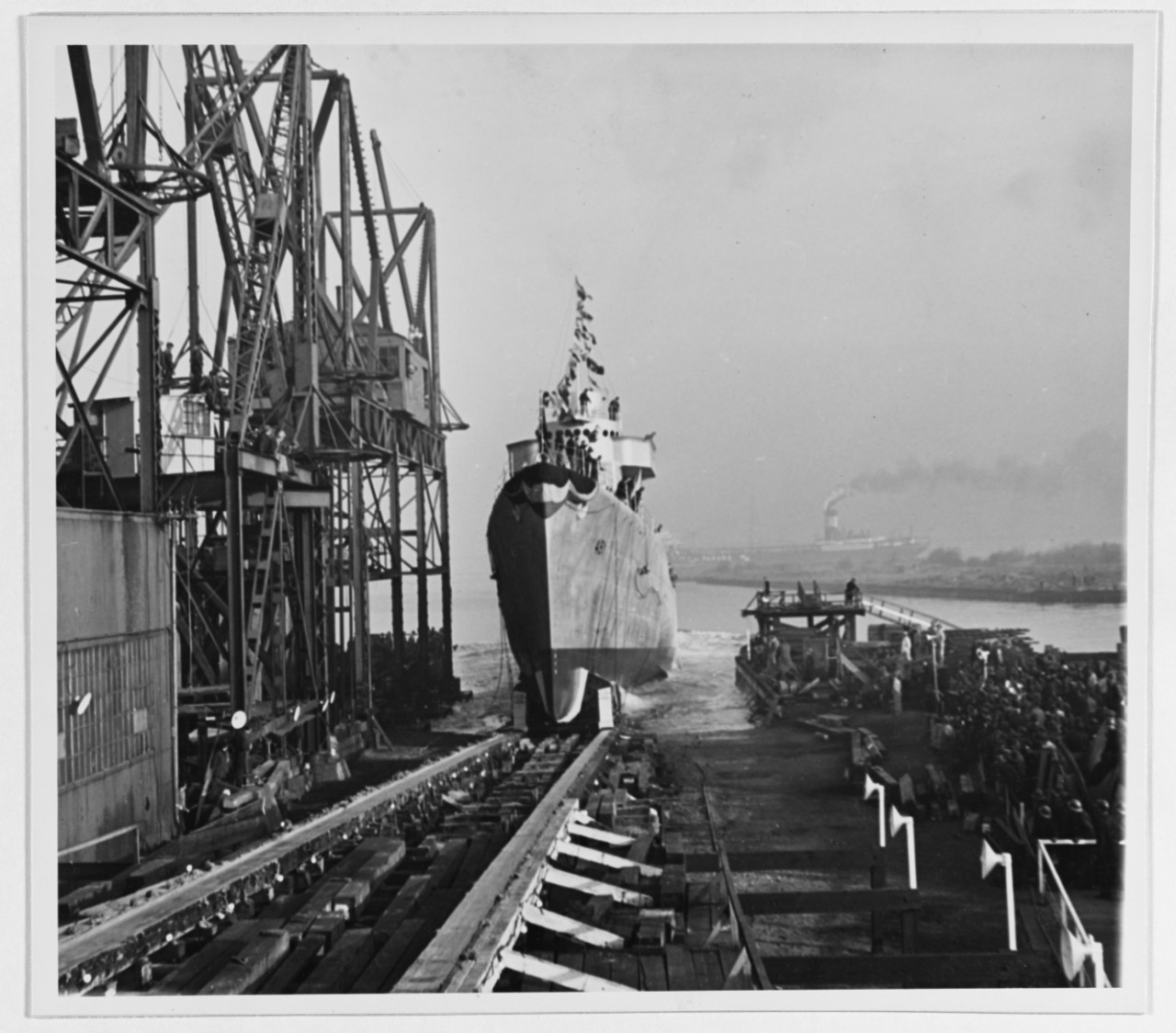
USS Farenholt DD-491 at Bethlehem Staten Island slides down the building ways, during her launching on 19 November 1941

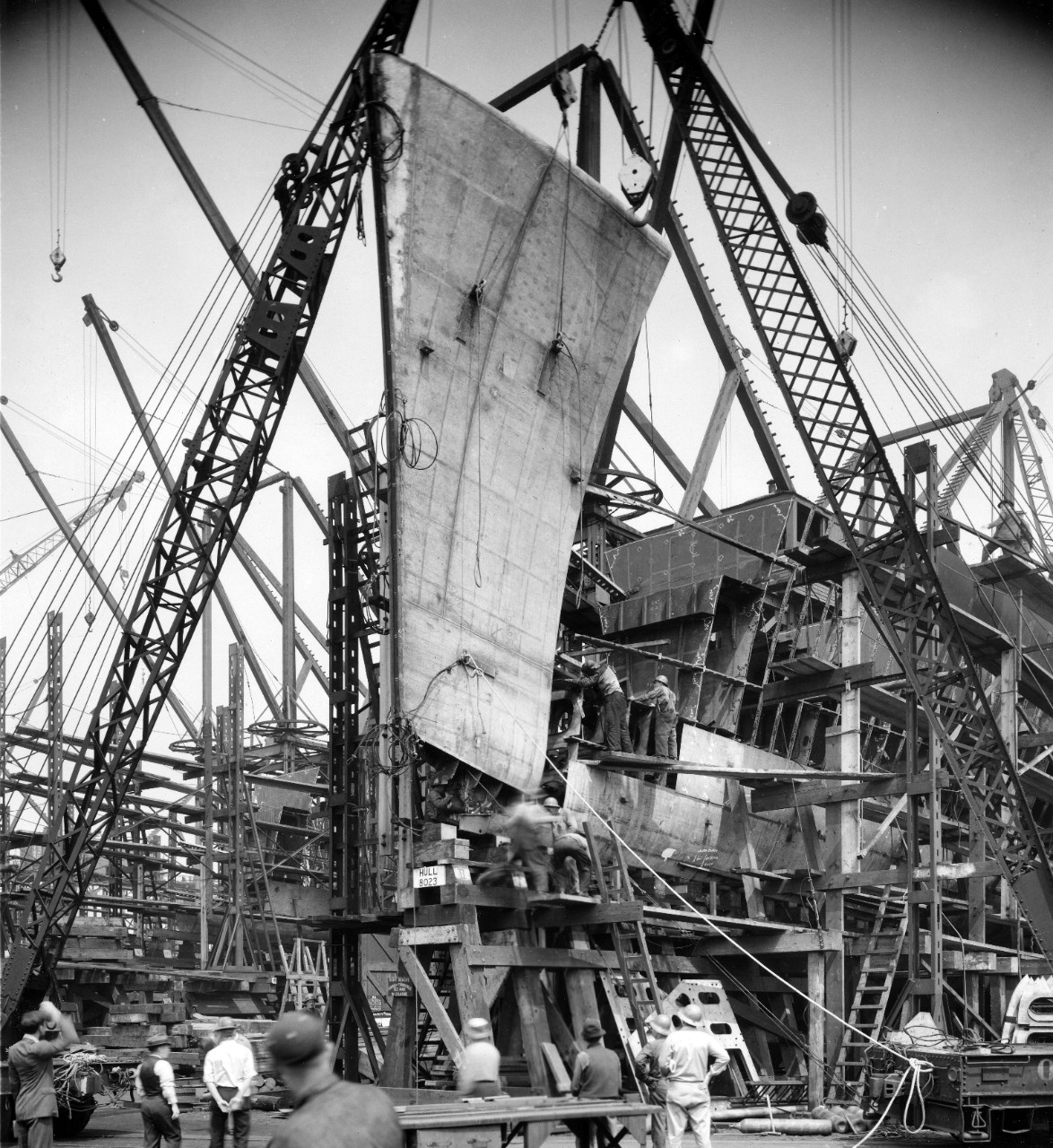
Bethlehem Staten Island ship building during World War 2

Bethlehem Staten Island also called Bethlehem Mariners Harbor was a large shipyard in Mariners Harbor, Staten Island, New York. The shipyard started building ships for World War II in January 1941 under the Emergency Shipbuilding Program and as the result of the Two-Ocean Navy Act of July 1940. The shipyard was part of the Bethlehem Shipbuilding Corporation which built ships for the United States Navy, and the United States Maritime Commission. Bethlehem Steel purchased the shipyard in June 1938 from United Shipyards. Bethlehem Shipbuilding Corporation closed the shipyard in 1959. The propeller factory and foundry continued operation for 10 more years at the site. Since 1980 the site is the May Ship Repair Contracting Corporation next to Shooters Island at the southern end of Newark Bay, off the North Shore.

== Staten Island Shipbuilding ==
The site started in 1903, when William Burlee built a shipyard at the site and opened as the Staten Island Shipbuilding (SISB). William Burlee sold the shipyard to United Shipyards in 1929. William Burlee started a repair shipyard in Port Richmond, Staten Island (2 miles east of SISB) in 1888 as the Burlee Drydock Company. In 1903 William Burlee opened a larger shipyard at Mariners Harbor. For World War I Staten Island Shipbuilding Port Richmond, built Lapwing-class minesweepers: AM5, AM6, AM7, AM8, AM44, AM45, and AM46. In 1923 SISB built four Staten Island Ferries: W.R. Hearst, George W. Loft, Youngstown and Rodman Wanamaker. In 1925 SISB built five more New York Ferries the: John A. Lynch, Henry Bruckner, William T. Collins, Henry A. Meyer Crathorne, in 1927 the American Legion and in 1927 the Dongan Hills.

- Alex McDonald Shipyard was small shipyard next to Staten Island Shipbuilding (on the east side). Alex McDonald founded the yard before World War I. Alex McDonald built seven 110 foot Submarine chasers for the US Navy for World War I. In 1929 Alex McDonald merged with Staten Island Shipbuilding.

== United Shipyards, Inc ==
In 1929, Staten Island Shipbuilding merged with five other major New York ship repair facilities to become United Dry Docks, Inc. —the largest company of its type in the world—with the former head of Morse Dry Dock and Repair Company, Edward P. Morse, as chairman of the board. United Dry Docks later changed its name to United Shipyards, Inc. United Shipyards sold off their shipyard to Bethlehem Steel in 1938.

== World War II ships ==
As United Dry Dock, Inc.

- 4 of 18 Mahan-class (1934 and 1935)
  - Mahan (DD-364), Cummings (DD-365), Dunlap (DD-384), Fanning (DD-385)

After acquisition by Bethlehem, in the very early stages of the Emergency Shipbuilding Program and at a time when the Navy shipbuilding program was just picking up momentum

- 5 of 95 C1-B (ca. 1939)
  - Cape May / Alcoa Pathfinder (MC-89), launched 3 Oct 1940
  - Cape Ann Alcoa Prospector (MC-90), launched 2 Nov 1940
  - Cape Neddick (MC-91)
  - Cape Cod (MC-92)
  - Stella Lykes (MC-93)
  - 2 Bethlehem Quincy steam turbines, double reduction gears, one shaft
- 3 of 29 Cherokee-class tugboats (fiscal year 1939)
  - Navajo (AT-64), Cherokee (AT-66), Seminole (AT-65)

Following the industrial mobilization as a result of the Two-Ocean Navy Act of July 1940 and subsequent legislation

- 44 of 415 destroyers
  - 5 of 30 Benson-class
    - Farenholt (DD-491), Bailey (DD-492)
    - Meade (DD-602) ... Parker (DD-604)
  - 15 of 175 Fletcher-class
    - Bache (DD-470), Beale (DD-471)
    - Brownson (DD-518) ... Luce (DD-522)
    - Charles J. Badger (DD-657), Colahan (DD-658)
    - Picking (DD-685) ... Uhlmann (DD-687)
    - Benham (DD-796) ... Monssen (DD-798)
  - 10 of 58 Allen M. Sumner-class
    - Blue (DD-744) ... Harry E. Hubbard (DD-748)
    - Alfred A. Cunningham (DD-752) ... Beatty (DD-756)
  - 3 of 12 Robert H. Smith-class destroyer minelayers (Allen M. Sumner)
    - Henry A. Wiley (DM-29) ... J. William Ditter (DM-31)
  - 11 of 98 Gearing-class
    - Vogelgesang (DD-862) ... Forrest Royal (DD-872)
- Type B ship barges

== Post war ==
Post war from 1946 to 1958 the shipyard built car floats, barges, ferries, tank barges, derrick barges, repair barge, fireboat and tugboats.

- Examples:
- LCU 1608, YFU-91, Landing Craft Utility
- USNS Chattahoochee (T-AOG-82)
- USAV Vulcan (FMS-789) Repair shop
- Walter B. Keane Ferry
- Joseph F. Merrell Ferry
- T1-MET-24a Tankers: Product Carrier and Product Carrier

== See also ==
- Bethlehem Elizabethport
- Bethlehem Brooklyn 56th Street
