= Villa Maria (Long Island) =

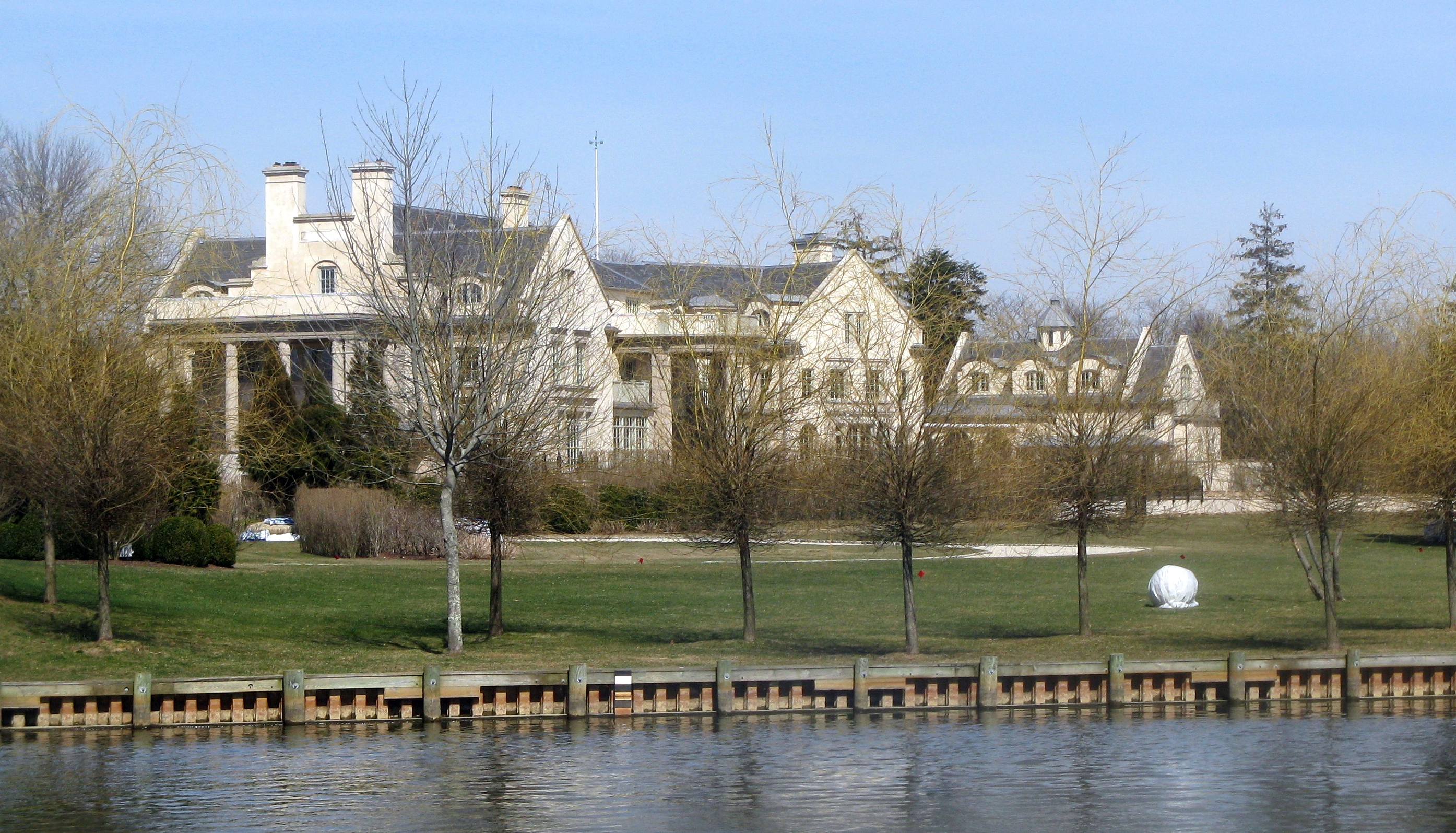
- Villa Maria from the southwest

- Location within New York
- Former names: Red Gables, Green Gables

General information
- Type: Private Residence
- Architectural style: Eclectic
- Location: Water Mill, New York, 615 Montauk Highway
- Coordinates: 40.908984°N 72.354444°W
- Construction started: 1887
- Completed: 1887?
- Renovated: 1919
- Owner: Luiz Zamorano Jr.

Design and construction
- Architect: George Skidmore

Renovating team
- Architect: Frank Freeman
- Other designers: Andre Tchelistcheff Architects (2009 Restoration)

Villa Maria is an estate in Water Mill, New York. Built as a private residence in 1887, the villa itself was remodeled by Brooklyn-based architect Frank Freeman in 1919. It later became a convent and spirituality center, before recently becoming a private residence once again. The building is considered a Long Island landmark.

== History ==
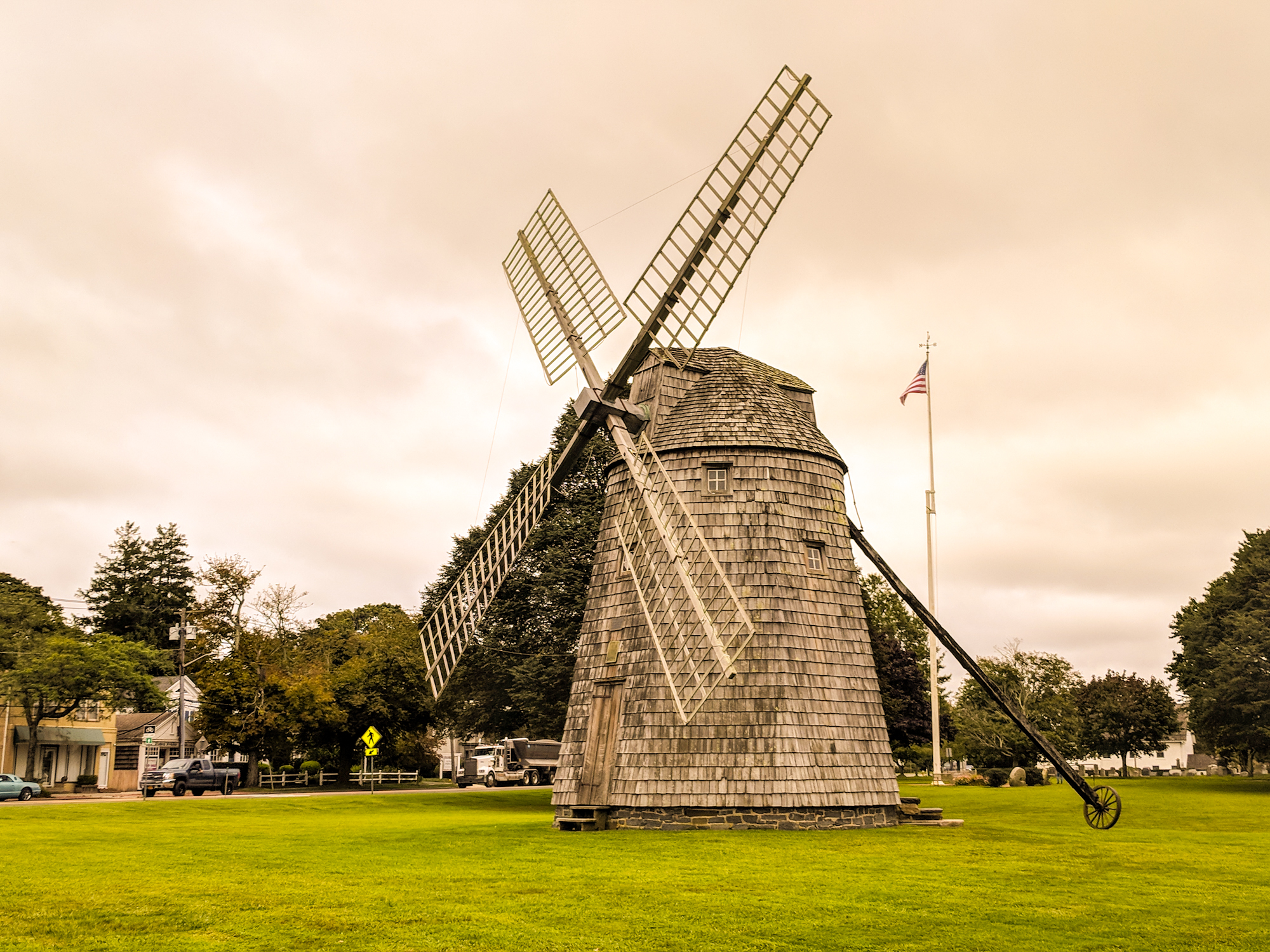
Windmill at Watermill, Southampton NY 20180914 080131

Villa Maria was originally built in 1887 as a "rambling, Queen Anne-style summer house" for partners, cousins, and industrial financiers Josiah Lombard and Marshall Ayres, Jr. of the Lombard, Ayres & Company. The original owners bought the Corwith Windmill for $900 in 1888, as Corwith had shifted his farms production over to poultry and potatoes and Ayers/Lombard wanted it for decoration on their one-acre front lawn where it stands today.

In the late 1890s, the building was sold to Dr. Edward L. Keyes, a New York urologist. The villa at this time was described as "a tall and very elaborate Victorian house", replete with "turrets, balconies, loggias" and protected by an old-fashioned red shingle roof—from which it derived its name, "Red Gables".

In 1909, Keyes sold the estate to New York businessman Edward P. Morse, proprietor of the Morse Dry Dock & Repair Company. During World War I, Morse's company made unprecedented profits, and shortly after the war, in 1919, Morse decided to embark on a substantial rebuild of the Long Island property. Morse commissioned Frank Freeman, an accomplished Brooklyn architect and fellow Canadian expatriate, for the redesign. Freeman virtually rebuilt the house, more than doubling its size, adding a living wing, a two-story staircase and a colonnaded portico, while the walls were refinished with a facade of Indiana limestone.

On August 17, 1929, Red Gables was auctioned to Courtland Palmer of Manhattan for $100,000. It was then passed on to actress Irene Coleman, whose stage name was Ann Murdagh. She then sold the estate to the Sisters of the Order of St. Dominic, a Roman Catholic order, for $250,000 in 1931. The sisters initially planned to convert the building into a girls' high school, but when this proved impractical, it was decided to utilize the building as a facility for aspirants to the order, whereupon it was renamed Villa Maria High School. In 1953, it became a retirement home for ageing sisters, a use it retained until 1985. In 1992, the Sisters added an arts and craft building to the estate, called the Siena Spirituality Center at Villa Maria, which offered courses in spirituality and holistic living. While the sisters owned the property, they agreed to sell the triangular piece of front lawn upon which the windmill sits to the town of Water Mill for $1. This would be used for a village green. The Dominicans reserved the right to take back this property for the amount they sold it for if the villagers were to use this location in a disreputable way. The current owners still have the right to buy back the village green of Watermill with the windmill on it for just $1, but only if said misbehavior occurs there. President Theodore Roosevelt's (1858–1919) favorite horse, "General Ruxton", is buried on the grounds.

In "2001 and 2002, Villa Maria hosted the Hampton Designer Showcase, an event that raise money for remedial work on the facilities"; unfortunately these events did not raise enough to sustain the large property and Villa Maria was put up for sale again in 2005, when it was sold to Nine West founder shoe manufacturer Vincent Camuto and his wife Louise for $35 million. The Camutos, with Andre Tchelistcheff Architects, embarked on a major restoration in 2007, which included adding a loggia leading to a carriage house, a pool and pool house, a walled outdoor fountain garden, and renovation of the gate house. In addition, the grounds were completely rehabilitated by Edmund Hollander Landscape Architects with a rose garden, new dock, and trees, hedges, and fencing along the Montauk Highway.

In 2018, the property sold for under $50 million.

== Description ==
Villa Maria is an eclectic-style building, incorporating elements of Beaux-Arts, Neoclassical and Colonial Revival design that sits on nearly 15 acres of land. It has been described as having "an arresting asymmetrical facade and complex roof lines breaking out into a profusion of windows and dormers". The main entrance is dominated by a grand Colonial-style portico, supported on four tall columns which rise to the height of the second floor. The walls are finished in stucco that looks like limestone.

The interior features a "huge" rotunda, rising to a dome-capped ceiling. The 27,000 square footbuilding includes 9 bedrooms, 13 bathrooms, a ballroom and institutional kitchen. The ballroom is now a grand living room. The original teak floor from the first renovation in 1905 is still in the living room. Its wide beams are connected by bow tie construction so the entire floor is held together without a nail. The floor was taken from one of the ships in Edward In addition to the main building, the estate also includes three cottages. The estate, which is set between Mill Creek and Mecox Bay, includes 1,100 feet (340 m) of waterfront. The villa in its entirety has been described as a "stunning sight" and is said to be "perhaps Water Mill's best-known landmark."

== Bibliography ==
- Baker, Anthony; MacKay, Robert B.; Traynor, Carol A.; Gill, Brendan: (1997): Long Island Country Houses and Their Architects, 1860-1940, W. W. Norton & Co., ISBN 978-0-393-03856-9.
