= Hoboken Historical Museum =

Museum in Hoboken, New Jersey

Coordinates: 40.7521°N 74.025°W

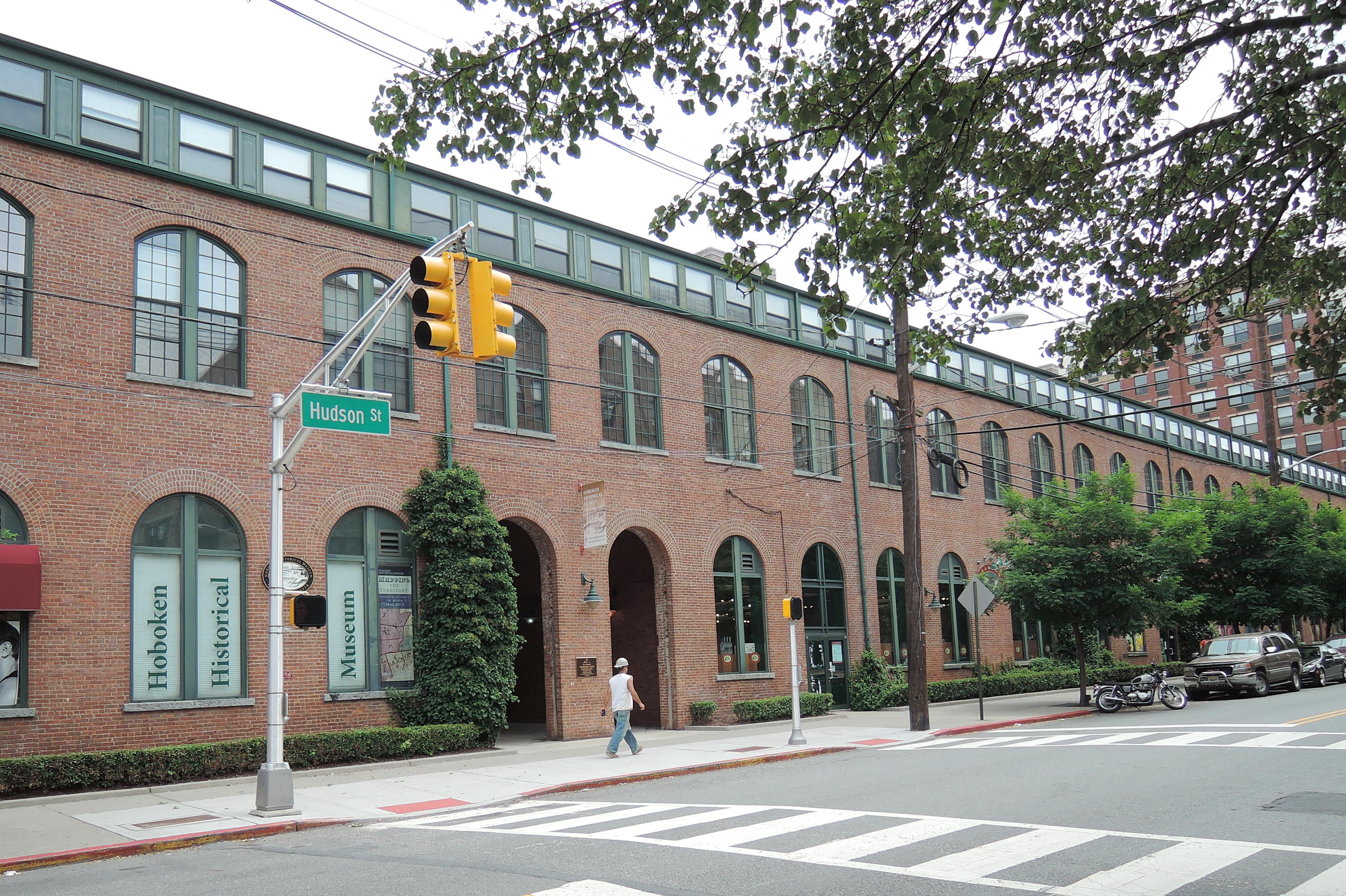
1301 Hudson Street

The Hoboken Historical Museum, founded in 1986, is located in Hoboken, New Jersey and presents rotating exhibitions and activities related to the history, culture, architecture and historic landmarks of the city and Hudson County. In 2001, the museum moved to 1301 Hudson Street into the last standing building of the former Bethlehem Steel Hoboken Shipyard.

Through its Hoboken Oral History Project, the museum and the Friends of the Hoboken Public Library have been capturing the recollections of longtime residents: stories about mom-and-pop shops, the city's many movie palaces, jazz clubs, vaudeville performances, political campaigns, ethnic traditions, and factory jobs.

The Thomas Edison Film Festival is based at the museum.

== See also ==
- Exhibitions in Hudson County
