= Hoboken Shipyard =

New Jersey American shipyard company

Hoboken Shipyard or Hoboken Yard or Beth Steel Hoboken (sometimes called The Plant) was a Bethlehem Shipbuilding Corporation shipyard that operated from 1938 to 1982 in Hoboken, New Jersey. Bethlehem Steel purchased the shipyard in 1938.

The shipyard was founded in 1890 by the W. & A. Fletcher Company. In 1928 Fletcher sold the yard to United Dry Dock Company, called the Fletcher Plant. W. & A. Fletcher Co. merged with five other New York-based shipbuilding/ship repair companies to form United Dry Docks, Inc. in February 1929. The yard had United States Navy contracts for ship repair.

In November 1982 Eliot Braswell, with Hoboken Shipyard, purchased the yard. The shipyard had been running at a loss when sold. Braswell was able to make cuts and keep the yard open. Braswell kept 103 workers and let the others go. Braswell also hired new workers. In 1999 the yard was closed and sold for 45 acres of land and waterfront development, including residences, retail space, a public promenade and a waterfront park. The waterfront development is between 12th Street, 16th Street and the Hudson River at 40.752029°N 74.0235°W.

Hoboken Historical Museum is last standing building of the former shipyard.

== See also ==
- Morse Dry Dock and Repair Company
- Calmar Steamship Company and other subsidiaries of the Bethlehem Steel
