= USAV Vulcan =

United States Army ship

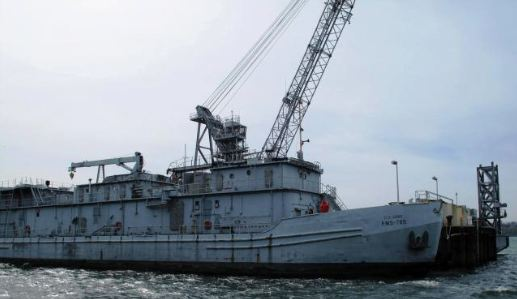
- USAV Vulcan (FMS 789)

History

United States
- Name: USAV Vulcan (FMS-789)
- Namesake: Vulcan, the Roman god of metalworking and the forge
- Owner: United States Army
- Builder: Bethlehem Steel Company, Staten Island, NY
- Yard number: 8335
- Acquired: September 1954
- Out of service: 2010
- Fate: Transferred to the Seattle Maritime Academy in 2010
- Status: In use as a floating classroom

General characteristics
- Type: Floating machine shop
- Displacement: 1,160 tons
- Length: 210 feet
- Propulsion: Unpowered

USAV Vulcan (FMS-789) was a floating machine shop operated by the United States Army. She was built at the Bethlehem Steel Company shipyard on Staten Island, New York and delivered in September 1954.

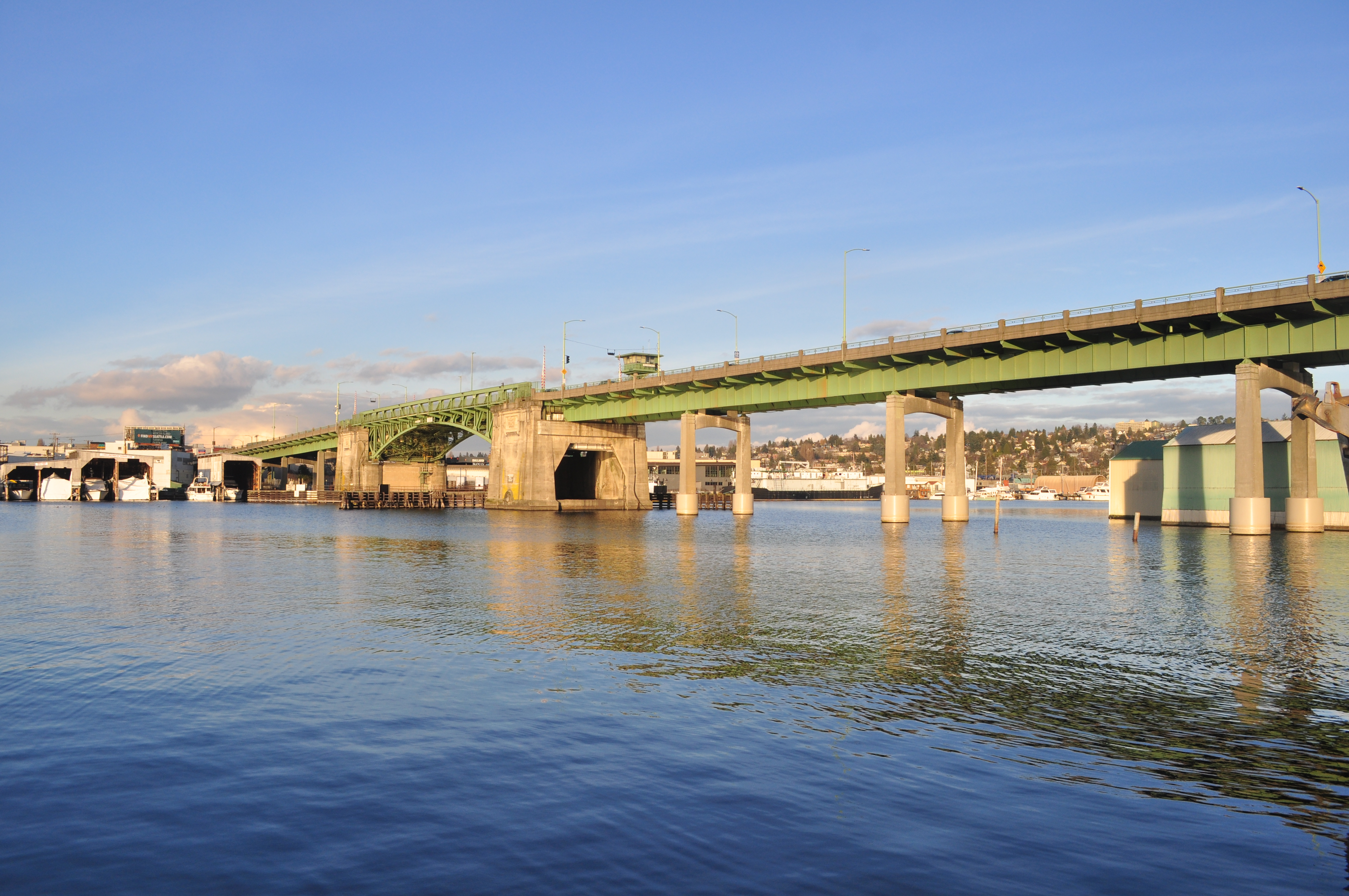
Vulcan seen at the Seattle Maritime Academy in 2019 (between the second and third bridge supports from the right).

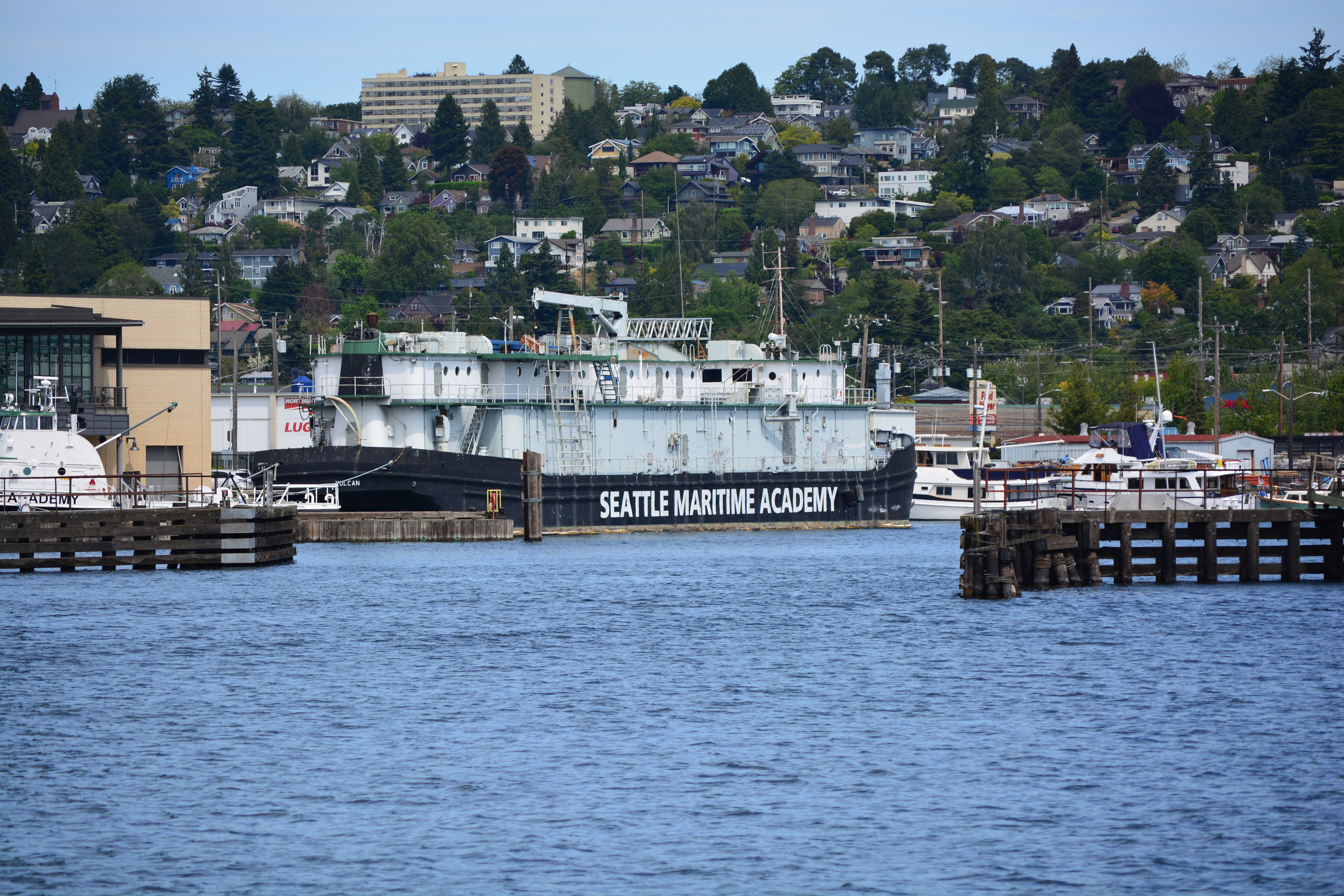
Vulcan seen at the Seattle Maritime Academy in 2024

Vulcan was retired from Army service sometime prior to April 2010 and acquired by the Seattle Maritime Academy for use as a floating classroom. She was towed to their facility east of the Ballard Bridge on 10 April 2010.
