= Edward P. Morse =

Canadian-American shipbuilder

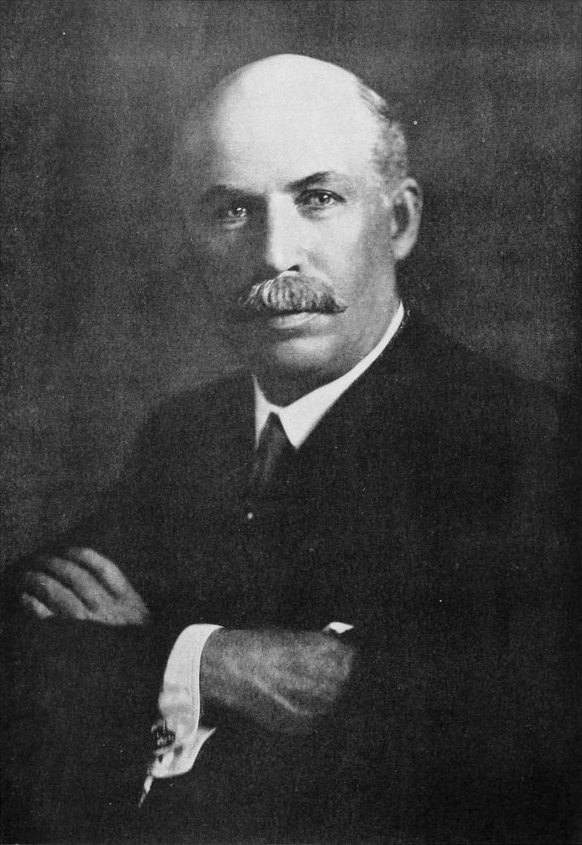
- Born: March 7, 1859; Clementsport, Nova Scotia, British North America
- Died: August 26, 1930 (aged 71); Clementsport, Nova Scotia
- Occupation: Business
- Known for: Proprietor of the Morse Dry Dock and Repair Company of Brooklyn, New York.

Edward Phinley Morse (7 March 1859—26 August 1930) was a Canadian-American industrialist and proprietor of the Morse Dry Dock and Repair Company, a major turn of the 20th century ship repair facility located in Brooklyn, New York. He later assisted in the creation of United Dry Docks, Inc., a corporation formed by the merger of six New York-based ship repair companies including his own, and at the time the largest corporation of its type in the world.

At one time, Morse's fortune was estimated to be $40 million, but after his death in 1930, his taxable estate was appraised at a relatively modest $1.646 million ($22.5 million in 2015 dollars).

== Life and career ==
Morse was born in Clementsport, Nova Scotia, British North American, in 1859. At the age of 20, he arrived in Brooklyn, New York, US, seeking work, which he eventually obtained in a shipsmithing yard. About five years later in 1885, he opened a small shipsmithing yard of his own at the foot of 26th Street, Brooklyn, which he named the Morse Iron Works.

In 1890 a fire destroyed the Morse Works but he re-established it quickly thereafter. Over the next dozen or so years, Morse was forced to place his company into receivership several times but on each occasion was able to recover and continue to expand the business. By 1900 his repair yard, now known as the Morse Iron Works and Dry Dock Company, was not only servicing many of the great steamships of the era, but was also maintaining the yachts of many members of New York's elite business community, including those of J. P. Morgan, Cornelius Vanderbilt III, John Jacob Astor IV and August Belmont, Jr. After a brief period in receivership due to industrial action in 1903, Morse reincorporated his yard in 1904 as the Morse Dry Dock and Repair Company.

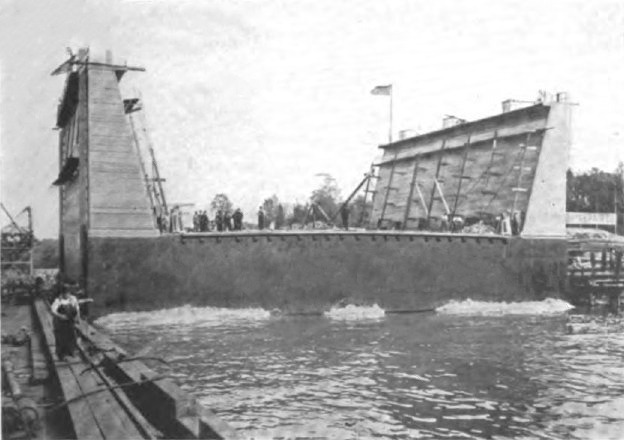
Launch of the 5th section of the Morse floating dry dock in 1919. The six-section floating dock was the world's largest.

Like many other U.S. shipyards, the Morse company made lucrative profits during World War I, estimated at more than $15,000,000. In 1919, the Morse Company built the world's largest floating dry dock, capable of servicing a ship 725 feet (221 m) long and weighing 30,000 tons.

Morse was a presidential elector in the 1924 presidential election.

In 1929, Morse masterminded the merger of six New York ship repair yards, including his own, into a new $20,000,000 entity named United Dry Docks, Inc. – the largest company of its type in the world. Morse was named president of the new company before being appointed chairman of the board. After only a short time in this role however, Morse retired from active business and returned to his native Nova Scotia, where he died a few months later at the age of 72.

=== Legal battle with son ===
After World War I, Morse became involved in a protracted legal dispute with his son, Edward P. Morse Jr., who had worked as a superintendent in his father's company during the war. Morse Jr. sued the company for two percent of its total wartime profits, a sum amounting to about $300,000, to which he claimed entitlement under an alleged condition of his employment contract. A jury found in his favor in 1920, but the case was appealed to the Brooklyn Supreme Court.

By this time Morse Jr. had become head of a rival company, the National Dry Dock and Repair Company of Staten Island. In 1921, a private detective was caught tapping phone conversations between Morse Jr. and his lawyers. Morse Jr. apparently believed the wiretap was in relation to the case against his father's company, but the private detective, who was later convicted of wiretapping, maintained ignorance of his client's identity.

Morse Jr. was eventually disinherited by his father. In May 1935, Morse Jr.'s case against his father's company was finally concluded when the Brooklyn Supreme Court ruled that the company owed him the sum of $540,283. Eighteen months later however, the Morse Dry Dock and Repair Company admitted to having overcharged the government and private clients during the war by $5,403,520, and since Morse Jr. had been a partner of the firm at the time, his award from the May 1935 case was consequently struck down.

=== Personal life ===
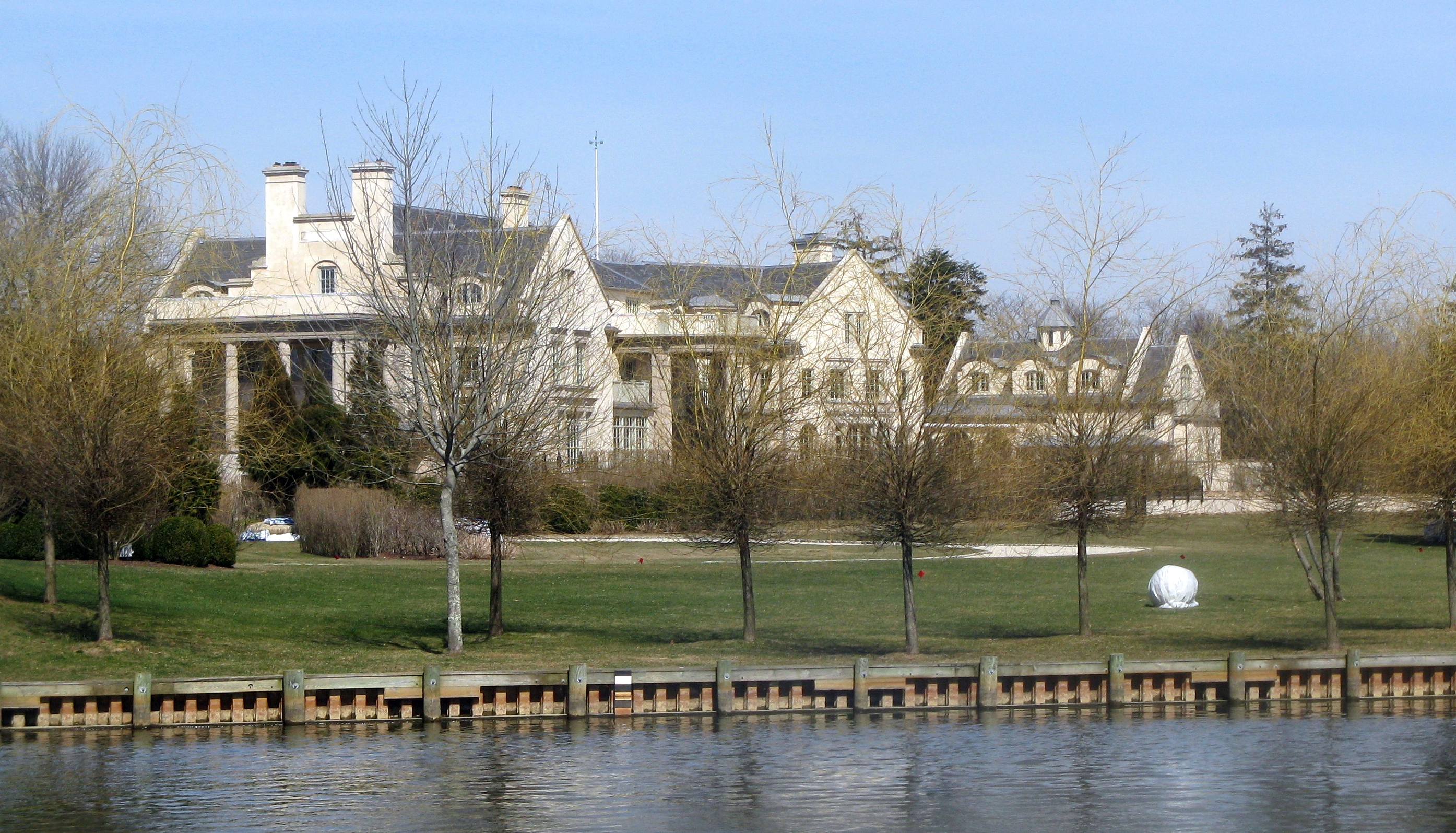
Villa Maria, Morse's former mansion in Long Island

Edward P. Morse married Ada Martha Gavel on November 8, 1878, shortly before leaving his hometown of Clementsport, Nova Scotia, to begin his Brooklyn career. The marriage produced three children: Jessie Elizabeth (1879–unknown), Edward Phinley Jr. (1882–1948) and Roy Bertram (1886–1953). Both sons followed Morse into the shipbuilding industry, Edward P. Jr. as head of a rival ship repair company, and Roy B. as head of a ship parts supply company.

Morse was a longtime resident of 47 Plaza Street, Brooklyn, but he also owned a 20-acre (81,000 m^{2}) estate on Long Island then known as "Grey Gables", known today as Villa Maria. According to a granddaughter, Morse was a non-smoker and teetotaller who was not overly fond of social occasions. He was however an enthusiastic horseman, maintaining his own stable, and at one time owned Theodore Roosevelt's favorite saddle-horse, General Ruxton.

== Death and legacy ==
After his retirement, Morse returned to his native Nova Scotia where he began building a $250,000 mansion at Deep Brook, not far from his Clementsport birthplace. On August 26, 1930, while overseeing construction of the building, Morse suffered a heart attack and died before the arrival of medical assistance. He was 72 years of age.

At the time of his death, Morse's fortune was estimated at $40,000,000, but his executors valued his estate at a relatively modest $1,645,953 net. Morse's 2,199 shares in his old company, Morse Dry Dock and Repair, were deemed worthless due to a pending $586,000 damages suit against the company by the owners of the tanker Egremont Castle, which had been improperly insured when damaged by an explosion at the Morse yard in the 1920s.

Morse was survived by his wife Ada, his three children, Edward P. Jr., Roy and Jessie, and eight grandchildren. Apart from Edward P. Jr., all were beneficiaries of Morse's will, including Jr.'s own children. The primary beneficiary of Morse's will was his daughter Jessie, with $150,000 plus two fifths of the residuary estate, followed by his wife Ada with $80,000 and one part, Jessie's two children with one part of the residuary estate each, and Morse's son Roy with $60,000. In addition to his wife and descendants, Morse's sister Mary and a former employee named Kirsten Jensen received $5,000 each. Morse also gave $500 to St. Clement's Episcopal Church in his native town.

=== Business legacy ===
After Morse's death, his Brooklyn ship repair yard remained in business another 33 years, first as part of the United Dry Docks/United Shipyards group, and later under the management of Bethlehem Shipbuilding as Bethlehem Brooklyn 56th Street. The yard closed in 1963 after 63 years of operation. In total, Morse's various companies and their successors contributed their services to the New York waterfront for some 78 years.
