= USNS Chattahoochee =

History

United States
- Name: USNS Chattahoochee T-AOG-82
- Namesake: Chattahoochee River in Georgia
- Builder: Bethlehem Steel, Baltimore, MD
- Laid down: 1 May 1956
- Launched: 4 December 1956
- Acquired: 22 October 1957
- Identification: IMO number: 8450615
- Fate: Disposed of by MARAD sale, 16 December 2006, to Teroaka Company of Japan

General characteristics
- Type: T1-M2-4A arctic tanker hull
- Displacement: 2,367 t.(lt) 5,720 t.(fl)
- Length: 302 ft (92 m)
- Beam: 61 ft (19 m)
- Draft: 23 ft (7.0 m)
- Propulsion: diesel electric, two shafts, 3,200hp
- Speed: 13 knots (24 km/h)
- Capacity: 30,000-bbls
- Complement: 51

USNS Chattahoochee (T-AOG-82) was launched on 4 December 1956 by Bethlehem Steel Corp. on Staten Island, New York, United States, and delivered to the Navy for assignment to Military Sea Transportation Service on 22 October 1957. She was taken out of service and sold to a private concern in 2006.
