= Morse Dry Dock and Repair Company =

Defunct ship repair company in New York City

Coordinates: 40.6484857°N 74.0242369°W

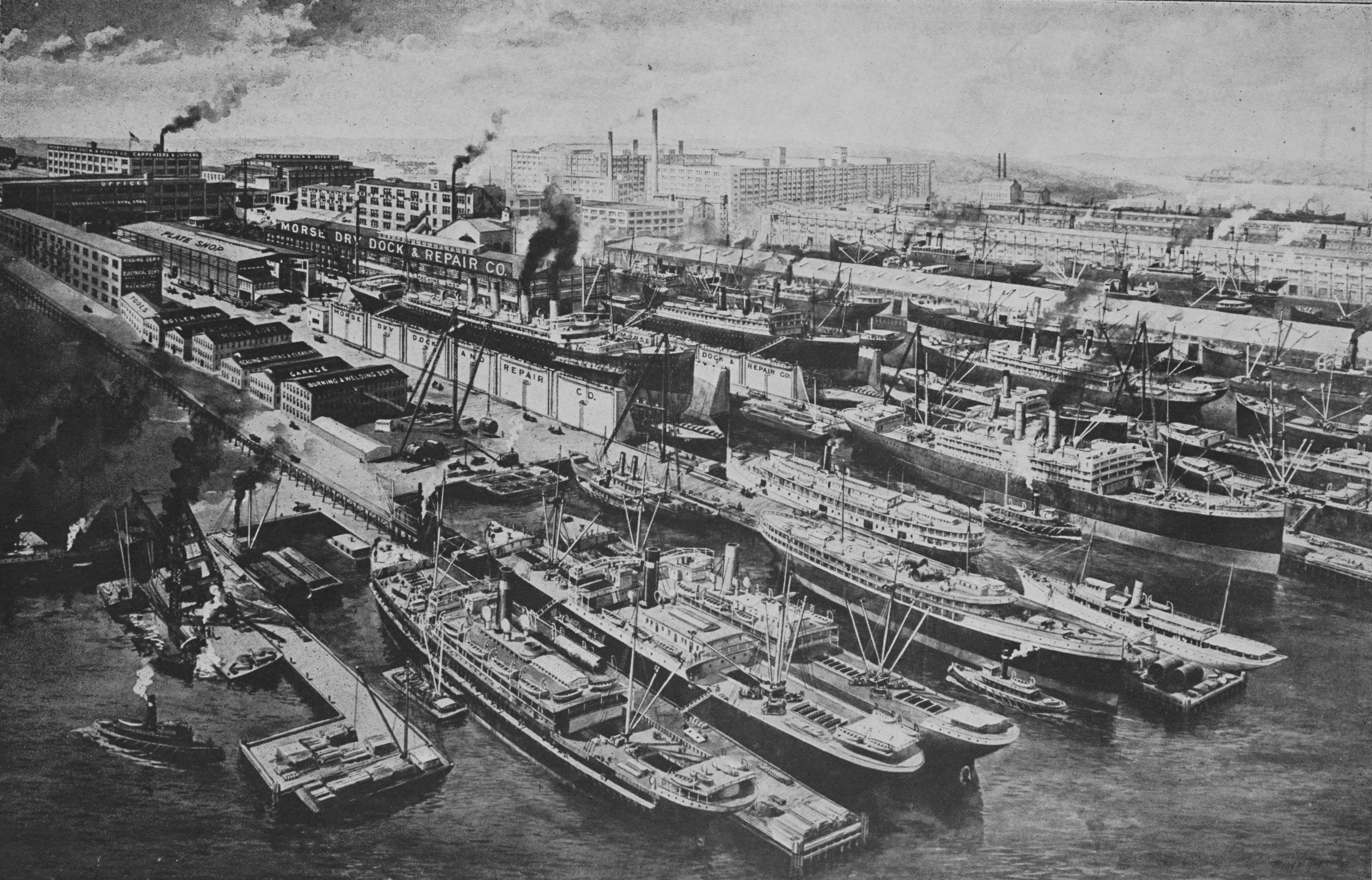
- Aerial view of the Morse Dry Dock and Repair Company, ca. 1920
- Type: Private, later public
- Industry: Shipbuilding
- Genre: Industrial
- Predecessor: Morse Iron Works and Dry Dock Company
- Founded: (as Morse Iron Works): 1885
- Founder: Edward P. Morse
- Defunct: February 1929
- Fate: Merged
- Successor: United Dry Docks, Inc.
- Headquarters: New York City, United States
- Services: Ship and boat repairs, maintenance, conversion and storage
- Owner: Edward P. Morse

The Morse Dry Dock and Repair Company was a major late 19th/early 20th century ship repair and conversion facility located in New York City. Begun in the 1880s as a small shipsmithing business known as the Morse Iron Works, the company grew to be one of America's largest ship repair and refit facilities, at one time owning the world's largest floating dry dock.

In addition to servicing some of the largest steamships of the era, the company maintained many of the yachts of New York's elite business community, and also occasionally built small watercraft such as tugboats. During World War I, the company was heavily engaged in work for the U.S. government and military.

In 1929, the company merged with five other major New York ship repair facilities to become United Dry Docks, Inc.—the largest company of its type in the world—with the former head of Morse Dry Dock, Edward P. Morse, as chairman of the board. United Dry Docks later changed its name to United Shipyards, Inc.

In 1938, United Shipyards was purchased by the Bethlehem Shipbuilding Corporation, which renamed the former Morse yard Bethlehem Brooklyn 56th Street. Bethlehem Shipbuilding continued to utilize the yard as a ship conversion and repair facility until 1963, when it was closed due to declining profitability.

== Early period, 1885–1903 ==
In 1880, Edward P. Morse, a 20-year-old native of Nova Scotia, Canada, arrived in New York seeking work as a shipsmith. Five years later in 1885, he opened his own ship repair business, operated from a 25 × 40 ft (7.6 × 12.2 m) building at the foot of 26th Street, Brooklyn, which he named the Morse Iron Works. In 1890, the Works was destroyed by fire but Morse quickly resumed operations. Business grew rapidly and in 1900, Morse incorporated the firm as the Morse Iron Works and Dry Dock Company, with a capital stock of $550,000.

Customers by this time consisted not only of American and foreign shipping lines seeking repairs and maintenance for their vessels, but also New York's elite yachting community, which included some of America's wealthiest business tycoons. John Jacob Astor IV had his steam yacht Nourmahal repaired there, while August Belmont Jr.'s yacht Scout was laid up at the Works in the winter season. Columbia, J. Pierpont Morgan's America's Cup defender, was prepared for her successful 1901 defense of the Cup at the Morse Works (as was the challenger, Sir Thomas Lipton's Shamrock II). Another wealthy patron of the company was Cornelius Vanderbilt III.

=== Expansion of facilities ===
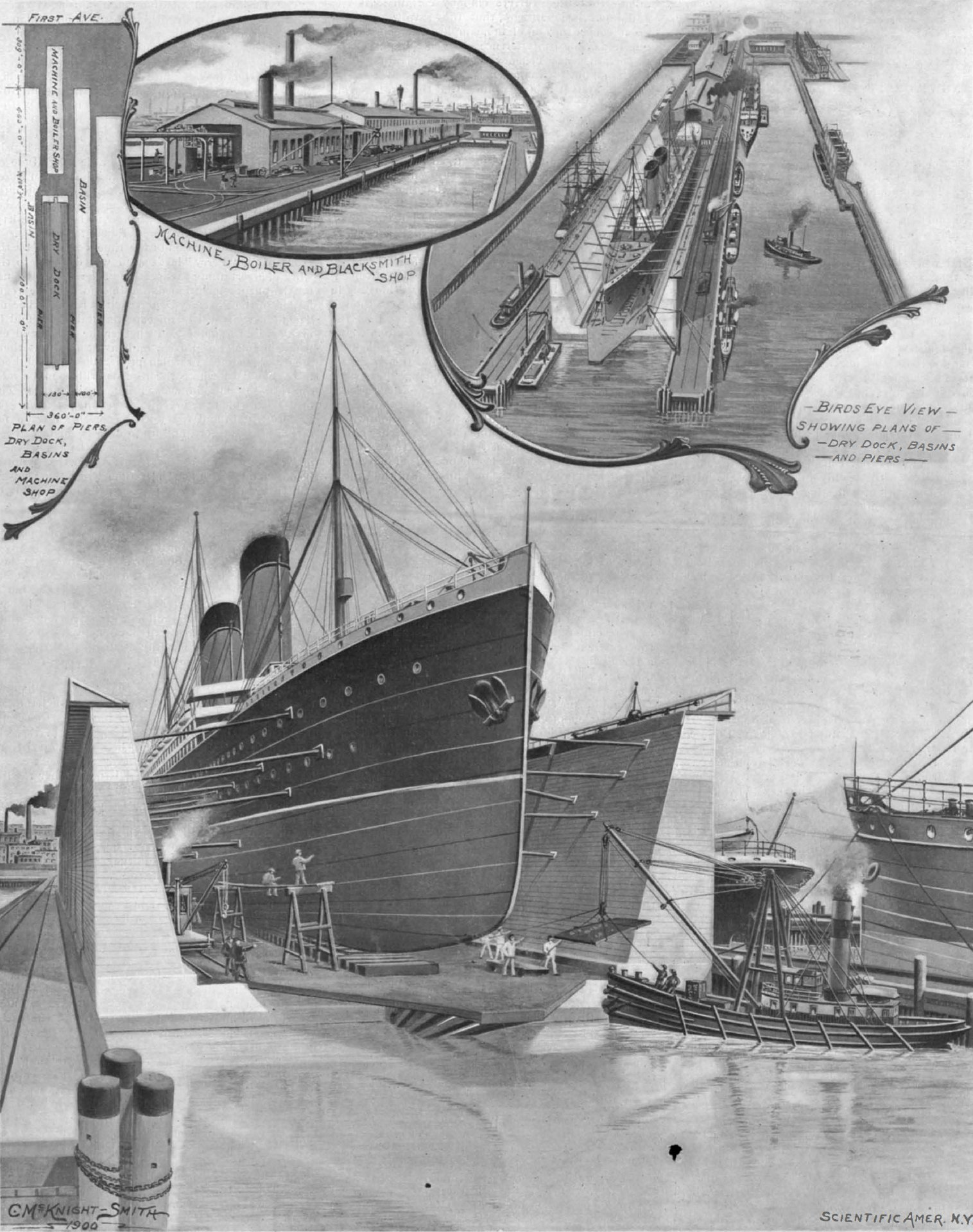
Artist's impression of the Morse Company's planned sectional dock and workshops, 1900

A month after the January 1900 incorporation, the Morse Works purchased the former property of the Atlantic Yacht Club between 55th and 57th Streets, Brooklyn, for the sum of $300,000, at the same time announcing the company's intention of shifting its locus of operations there, where it planned to build a sectional floating dry dock "capable of taking the largest ship afloat". In April, a large number of yachts moored at the site were given notice to move in order for construction of the dry dock to begin, and about twenty were subsequently relocated to Morse's existing plant at 26th Street. Construction of the dry dock began in May, and took two years to complete. New piers and plant buildings were also constructed.

In 1901 and 1902 the Morse Works reported annual profits of $80,000 and $106,000 respectively. In January 1902, the company reported total assets of $1,352,758 and liabilities of $614,998, the latter of which consisted mostly of mortgage bonds secured against the company's properties. In January 1903, the company asked for an extension of its loans due to tardy payments from the U.S. government, for whom it had recently completed a considerable amount of work.

=== Completion of dry dock and bankruptcy, 1903 ===
In 1903 the Morse Works completed its floating dry dock. The company's principle asset, and worth several hundred thousand dollars, it was at time of completion the world's only electrically-equipped floating dock, as well as being the first fitted with centrifugal pumps, the first powered by A/C induction motors and the first with an auxiliary pumping system. The 15,000-ton capacity facility would later prove itself capable of lifting three times the annual tonnage of any other floating dock in the country.

This addition to the company's facilities might have been expected to substantially increase profits. However, in the same year, many of New York's shipbuilding and repair yards were hit by a series of labor strikes led by the International Association of Machinists, and the Morse Works was one of the worst affected. In early October 1903, the Morse Iron Works and Dry Dock Company announced that it was filing for bankruptcy, and the company's activities temporarily came to a halt.

== Reincorporation to World War I, 1904–1914 ==
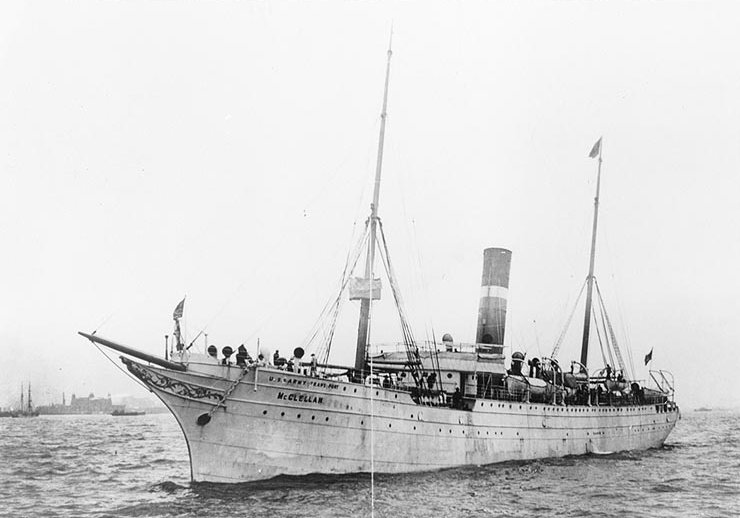
USAT McClellan was threatened by a fire at the Morse Works in 1905

In spite of this setback, Edward P. Morse had no intention of quitting the business. With the assistance of a financier, Daniel J. Leary, Morse was able to repurchase his own plant and equipment at the trustee's sale, which he subsequently reincorporated for the sum of $600,000 in August 1904 as the Morse Dry Dock and Repair Company.

A few months later, in December 1905, an old wooden sidewheel steamer of the Joy Line called Rosalie, which had recently been laid up in Winter quarters at the Morse Works, caught fire, threatening several other ships at the yard, including the Army transport USAT McClellan and the City of Key West. Quick action by crew and workmen saved the latter two ships, but Rosalie suffered an estimated $50,000 damage. About twenty vessels were laid up in Winter quarters at the Morse Works at the time.

In 1908, Morse filed for bankruptcy again, claiming in court that his only possessions were $100 in clothing. He appears to have resolved his difficulties with creditors on this occasion however, as the company remained in business. In 1909, the Morse Works fitted a more powerful, 500 horsepower motor to Price McKinley's speedboat Standard, with which McKinley hoped to win the International Grand Prix in Monaco. The world record for a speedboat at the time was 37 mph.

== World War I and postwar period ==
In September 1917, a few months after America's entry into World War I, the Morse Dry Dock and Repair Company, which for some time had been exclusively engaged in "government work of great importance", had its facilities declared a government reservation. As a consequence, a company of soldiers was quartered on the Morse properties and assigned to make regular patrols of the yards' boundaries, while motor boats patrolled the waterfront. Additionally, 39 saloons near the plant were shut down by the government, prompting an injunction which was overturned in December by an appellate court. In spite of these precautions, a fire, thought to have been started by an incendiary device, swept the plant on December 3, doing $500,000 worth of damage. Eight ships docked at the works, some of which had been seized from Germany, and which were in the process of being refitted for U.S. government service, were safely towed into the bay while the fire was brought under control.

By mid-1918, many of the cargo ships built as part of the United States Shipping Board's emergency wartime construction program were found to be in need of repairs, due to their hasty construction. In May, the USSB began an extensive repair program for these ships, allocating contracts to shipyards by tender. During the first three months of the program, the Morse Dry Dock & Repair Company secured $750,000 of contracts of this type, covering repairs to 77 USSB ships—more than twice the $350,000 value of contracts secured by its nearest competitor. By the end of the year, the USSB had spent a total of $20 million on such contracts.

The Morse company made unprecedented profits during the war, totalling more than $15,000,000 between January 1916 and June 1918 alone. Ironically, this lucrative period in the company's history would lead to a permanent rift between the firm's proprietor Edward P. Morse and his son Edward P. Jr., who had worked as a company superintendent during the war and who later successfully sued the firm for over $300,000 in unpaid bonuses. Morse Jr.'s award was eventually overturned after the company admitted to overcharging both the government and private clients during the war by an aggregate of more than $5,000,000.

=== Plant and equipment, 1918-19 ===
After the destruction of the Morse yard's blacksmith shop in the December 1917 fire, a new steel-and-glass shop was constructed at the foot of the company's South Pier. The new shop included 56 furnaces and a number of steam hammers. A new heavy forge shop was also built. This shop had nine oil-fired heating furnaces, including a 27-foot (8.2 m) car bottom type annealing furnace, all with doors operated by compressed air. The shop also contained a 50-ton steam hydraulic press capable of delivering a 1,000-ton pressure, a 4,000 lb double frame steam hammer with a 2-ton capacity, a 20-ton overhead crane and 10-ton auxiliary hoist along with two 25-ton rotators, and even its own railway siding and derrick. Other facilities of the Morse yard around this time included a three-story machine shop, carpentry shop, pattern and joining shop, storage depots etc.

To move materials around the yard, the company had its own dedicated "dry land transportation fleet" consisting of 28 trucks with capacities of between one and five tons, including three all-electric vehicles. The company's water transportation fleet, with its 15 vessels, was said to be the most complete of any ship repair yard in the country.

==== World's largest floating dry dock ====
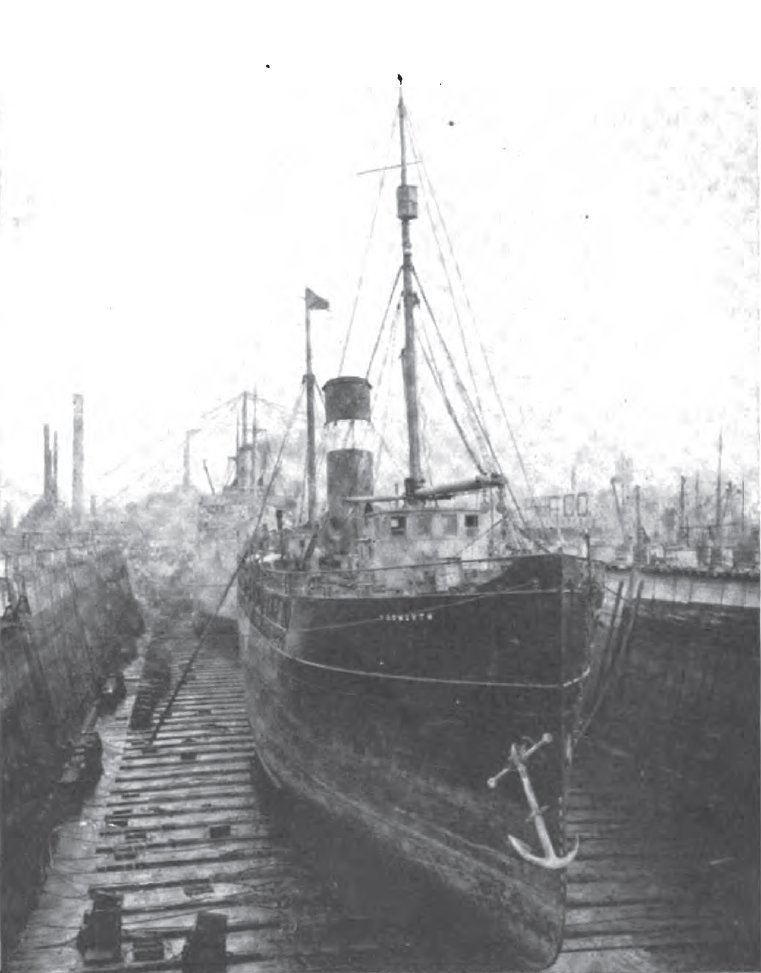
Two steamers in the Morse dry dock, circa 1919-1920

In late 1918, the Morse Dry Dock company began work on a new sectional floating dry dock. Constructed from at least three million board feet of timber, and said to be a far more complex and difficult task than the building of a ship, the $1,000,000 dock was six years in the planning and took more than twelve months to build. It was constructed section by section at an ancillary yard of the company at the foot of 63rd St., Brooklyn. By March 1919, the first three sections were ready and were put to use for the first time in lifting the steamer Black Arrow out of the water, at the rate of one foot per minute.

When completed in late 1919, the six-section dock was the largest floating dry dock in the world, capable of lifting a ship 725 feet (221 m) long and weighing 30,000 tons. Alternatively, the dock could lift two smaller ships simultaneously. Three sections alone could lift a ship of 15,000 tons and 475 feet (145 m), four sections a vessel of 20,000 tons and 550 feet (170 m), and five, a ship of 25,000 tons and 625 feet (191 m). In February 1920, all six sections of the dock were used to lift a single ship for the first time, the 30,000-ton SS Minnesota, an operation that took 25 minutes.

=== Company activities, 1919 ===
From January 1919 to February 1920, the New York boating magazine The Rudder published a series of articles on the Morse Dry Dock & Repair Company, which provide a record of some of the company's activities as well as giving an indication of its capabilities. Some of the more notable jobs completed by the company in this period are listed below.

- In January 1919, the government asked the Morse company at very short notice to revamp the U.S. Navy transport USS George Washington in preparation for President Woodrow Wilson's voyage to Europe for the Paris Peace Conference. In the space of just 76 hours, the company redecorated 49 of the ship's staterooms, rebuilt 16 bathrooms (including the installation of both hot and cold fresh water in place of unheated seawater); rebuilt a conference hall, two smoking rooms, a ladies lounge and a messhall; refinished all corridors on the main deck, fully enclosed the promenade deck under 106 panes of glass, and refinished or replaced missing furniture. The swift completion of this contract earned a letter of commendation from the Navy.
- In March, the company completed construction of its new tugboat, E. P. Morse. The 108-foot-long (33 m) boat, equipped for operation with both coal and oil fuel, was described as "practically the only modern ice breaker in the port of New York", and was expected to find considerable employment not only with the Morse company but also with other companies.
- On April 19, the company began the conversion of the former German ocean liner Kaiserin Auguste Victoria into a U.S. Navy transport. The conversion involved the installation of 6,500 bunks, construction of a 1,000-seat messroom with over 1,300 feet (400 m) of mess tables, construction of a 104-person sick bay, installation of new galley fixtures including coal ranges, bake ovens and 40- to 80-gallon kettles, installation of 500 feet (150 m) of washbasins, the addition of 109 liferafts and 90 emergency ladders, and the conversion of all firehose connections to Navy standard. In addition, the ship's engines were given a complete overhaul, and eight freshwater tanks and the ship's portside lights were repaired. The original contract called for the work to be completed in two weeks, but by utilizing its "man-a-minute" hiring system developed during the war, the company was able to rapidly expand the workforce allocated to the ship from an initial 350 to almost 2,000, completing the work in only eleven days and earning the company another Navy letter of commendation.
- Around the same time, the company was contracted to strengthen the engine foundations of the transport USS Henderson. In order to achieve this, the engine-room superstructure had to be removed and the engines lifted out of the way. Using a combination of steam jacks, screw jacks and chain blocks, this task was completed by the company's riggers in the space of seven hours.
- The company gutted and rebuilt the SS Powhatan, a ship which had been sunk 15 December 1916 in a collision with the British ship SS Telena on Thimble Shoal in Chesapeake Bay and left underwater for six months before being salvaged. Powhatan was declared a total loss by both owners and underwriters and remained unsalvaged until wartime demands for shipping resulted in the hulk being raised and taken into Norfolk, Virginia until a rehabilitation plan was established and Morse tugs towed it to the company's Brooklyn yard. Damaged and corroded plates and frames were removed along with all machinery and there "was scarcely a whole shell" by the time the rebuild that converted the ship into the world's first electric drive passenger ship, SS Cuba, began.
- Another ship given an extensive rebuild in this period was Ontario, a vessel which had suffered severe damage from a fire.
- By December, the company had begun work on a reconversion of the U.S. Navy transport USS Huron into a civilian ocean liner, a contract described as "the largest ship repair job ever handled" in the United States. Mechanical improvements to the ship were to include the installation of a fuel-oil burning system "with 24 furnace fronts", and the installation of a Sperry gyrostabilizer together with a foundation capable of absorbing a maximum thrust of 470,000 lbs. Passenger accommodations were to be improved with the construction of a gymnasium, library and reading room, the latter two finished in hardwood and pine panelling, and the refitting of a smoking room and the passenger cabins, plus other improvements including the addition of two sick bays and installation of a new fire-indicating and extinguishing system.
- Other jobs carried out by the company during the year included the complete electrical rewiring of ships, coal-to-oil fuel conversions, refurbishment or replacement of ships' boilers and boiler pipes, recaulking jobs, repair of damage to rudders and propellers, and so on. The company also occasionally bought ships for reconditioning, which it would then sell on the open market, as it did in 1914 with the ocean liner Oceana.
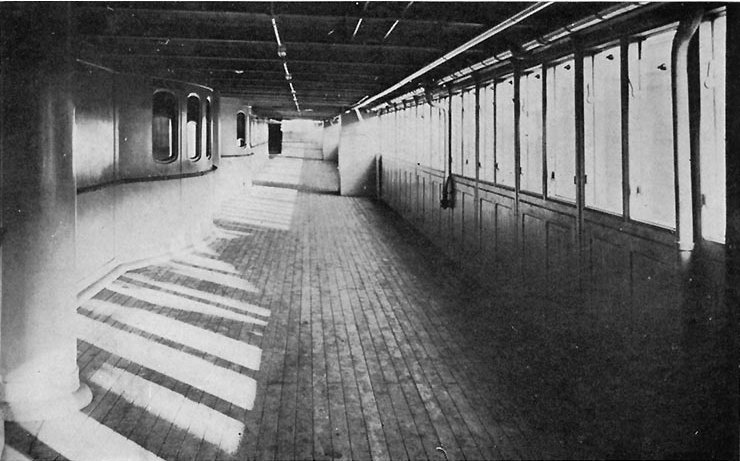
The promenade deck of USS George Washington was completely enclosed in glass by the Morse company for Wilson's 1919 voyage to the Paris Peace Conference.

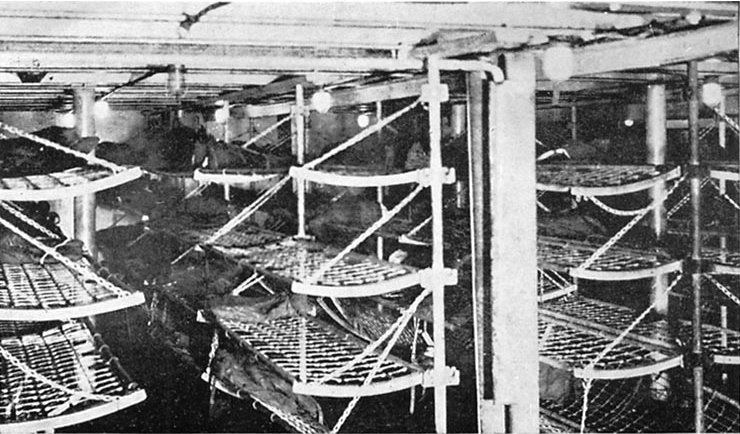
Soldiers' bunk beds in USS Kaiserin Auguste Victoria. The Morse company installed 6,500 such bunks in the ship in 1919.

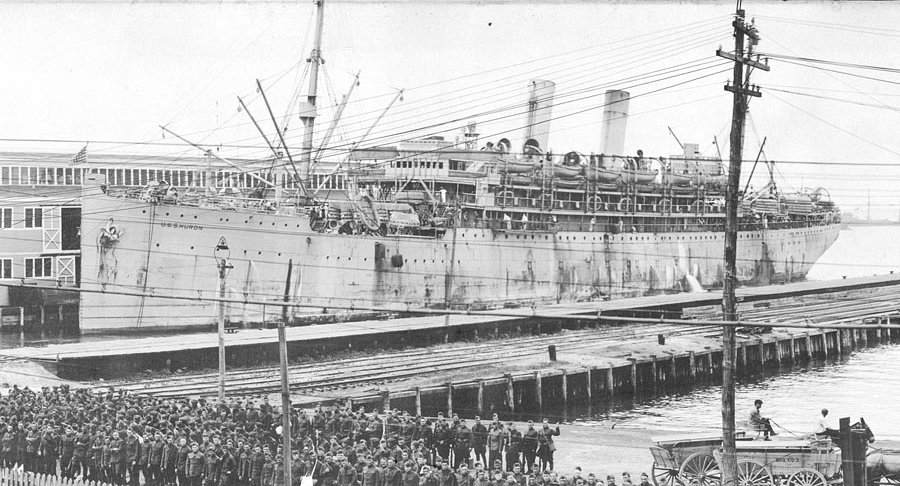
USS Huron in July 1919, shortly before her reconversion into a passenger ship by the Morse company.

=== Company culture ===
By the end of World War I, the Morse company had developed a relatively sophisticated labor relations culture. The company had its own simple health insurance scheme into which each employee paid 20 cents a week, which entitled him to pay of one dollar a day when sick, and $100 to his family in the event of his death. The company also ran a shipfitters' school for those employees interested in improving their skills. In its first few months of operation, the school attracted some 68 attendees.

The Morse company's Employees' Association ran regular entertainments, including dances and athletics meetings. A band, formed of company employees, gave noonday concerts twice a week from a bandstand in the company grounds, which are said to have been very well attended. A piano-backed quartet also gave performances.

The company fielded a number of athletics teams, which competed in various local and state competitions. Probably the best known of these was the Brooklyn Morse Dry Dock soccer team, which in 1918 won the New York State Football Association championship. The following year, the team played in the National Association Football League and made it to the quarterfinals of the American Cup and the semifinals of the National Challenge Cup.

==== The Dry Dock Dial ====
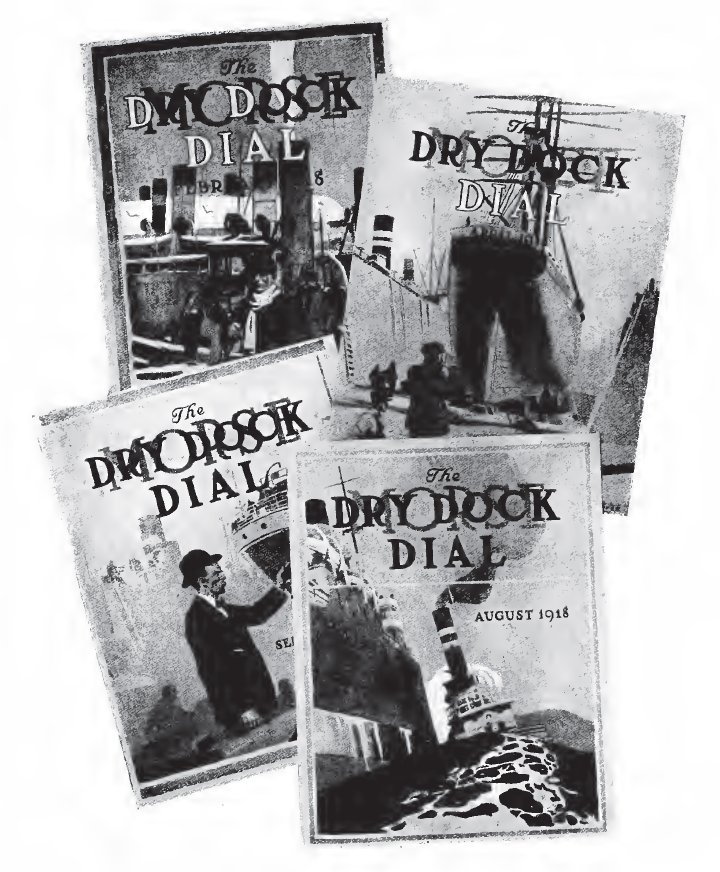
The Dry Dock Dial, the Morse plant's periodical, was considered a model of its type.

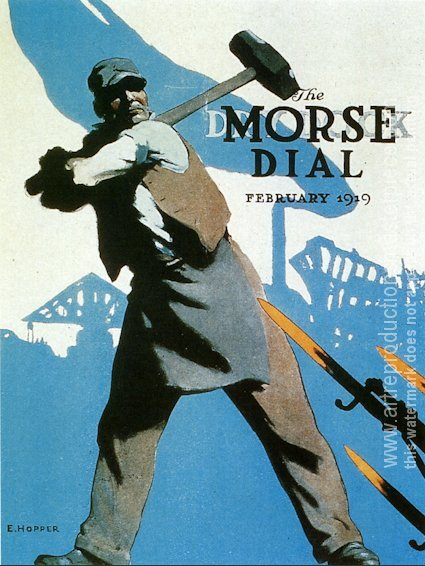
"Smash The Hun", Edward Hopper's prizewinning poster on the front cover of the Dial.

During the war, many shipyards began publishing their own in-house newsletters which were distributed to their employees as a means of boosting workforce morale and productivity and increasing loyalty. After the war, the number of these house organs grew dramatically, as they were also considered an important means of countering postwar, radical labor propaganda disseminated by the Industrial Workers of the World.

The Morse company's own contribution to this field was The Dry Dock Dial, a 16-page periodical that was mailed out to employees' homes once a month. Initially founded, in the words of E. P. Morse himself, "to bring our men closer together, to make them familiar with the doings in the yard and to arouse their interest in the welfare of the company", the Dial was run by a professional staff of ex-newspapermen and quickly established itself as the shipbuilding industry's leading in-house publication.

Printed on heavy stock paper, the Dial featured color covers and was liberally illustrated throughout with black-and-white images and photos. Typical content included patriotic stories, educational pieces, reports on company or industry-related events, features on leading company employees/employee teams and their workplace achievements, reports on the performances of the company's sporting teams, letters and other contributions from the employees themselves, and so on. The magazine also catered to employees' spouses, with a women's page featuring baby pictures, recipes and other items deemed of interest to females. Anti-Bolshevist propaganda was for the most part not overt, but subtly woven in with the other content.

One of the Dial's illustrators, responsible for many of the Dial's covers, was Edward Hopper. Hopper won a nationwide competition during the war for a patriotic poster design entitled "Smash The Hun". The design, which featured a Morse company worker swinging a large sledgehammer toward a nest of threatening bayonets, was later reproduced (without the accompanying caption) on the cover of the Dial's February 1919 edition. Hopper would later achieve fame as a leading artist of the American realist school.

== Later history ==
=== World's first electric-drive passenger ship Cuba ===
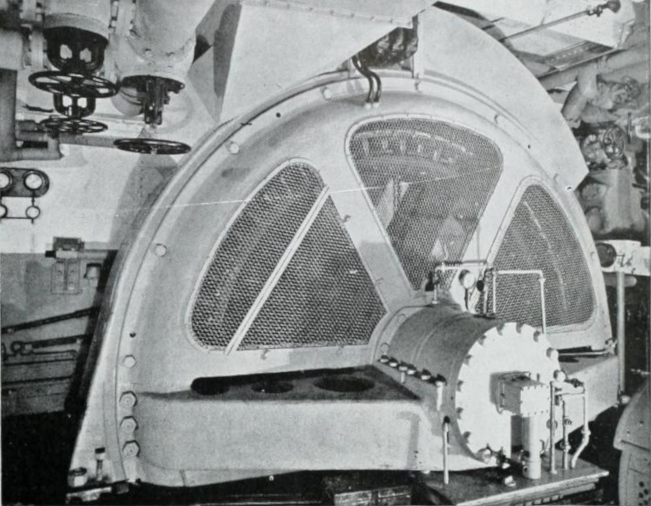
3,000-horsepower, 1,150-volt, 1,180-ampere electric propulsion motor installed in Cuba

The rebuilt Powhatan, renamed Cuba, underwent trials and began operation in late 1920 as the world's first passenger ship with an electric drive. In addition to the propulsion being electric Cuba was to be electrically lit, with all auxiliary machinery being electric. On trials with the propulsion motor delivering full 3,000 horsepower, the ship attained a speed of 17.28 knots. Electric power was provided by a steam plant of four Scotch boilers, each with three oil-fired furnaces, driving a General Electric eight-stage turbo-generator set which in turn provided power at 1,100 volts, 1,234 amperes rated at 2,350 kilowatts delivering 50-cycle alternating current to the General Electric synchronous-type electric motor with a rated 3,000 horsepower running at 1,150 volts and 1,180 amperes driving the shaft and 15-foot (4.6 m) four-bladed propeller. Two 150-kilowatt General Electric turbo-generator sets provided lighting and power for auxiliary machinery with a half-kilowatt Holtzer-Cabot Electric Company generator providing power for wireless communication. Cuba was a relatively small ship of 3,580 tons displacement at 17 feet (5.2 m) draft, 320 feet 6 inches (97.7 m) length overall and was not intended by its owners, Miami Steamship Company, to carry any cargo other than automobiles on deck, express freight and some refrigerated fruit, with emphasis put on passenger accommodations and spaces—so that Cuba could "well be called a luxurious yacht rather than a passenger steamship" for its operation between Jacksonville, Florida, and Havana, Cuba.

=== America's Cup and other events ===
In July 1920, the Morse company again played host to America's cup yachts when the defender Resolute and the challenger Shamrock IV were prepared for their races at the Morse yard. The company also provided entertainment for the yachts' crews. Shamrock IV went on to win the first two races of the series, making her the most successful challenger to that date, but was beaten in the latter three to lose the series 3–2.

In January 1921, an explosion on board the Standard Oil tanker Ardmore, under repair at the Morse yard, killed four men and injured several others. A year later, another fire, started in one of the company's garages, destroyed 25 vehicles and two pipe houses, with the total damage estimated at $150,000. In June 1924, a fire at the Morse plant ravaged the steamer Egremont Castle, doing $586,000 worth of damage. Due to problems with the insurance papers in this latter accident, the company was forced to foot the entire bill.

== United Shipyards ==
In January 1929, Edward P. Morse announced plans for the merger of six New York ship repair companies, including his own firm the Morse Dry Dock and Repair Company, into a new $20,000,000 entity to be known as United Dry Docks, Inc. The other five companies involved in the merger were James Shewan & Sons, W. & A. Fletcher Company (owner of the Hoboken Shipyard), New York Harbor Dry Dock Company Inc. (owner of Bayles Shipyard), the Staten Island Shipbuilding Company, and Theodore A. Crane & Sons. After the merger, the newly formed company controlled 27 dry docks with a total lifting capacity in excess of 160,000 tons—more than 50% of the total capacity of the port of New York—making it the largest company of its type in the world, with an estimated annual business volume of 7,000,000 tons. Edward P. Morse became President of the new company, which was formally incorporated in late February 1929.

Having overseen the creation of United Dry Docks, Morse briefly served as chairman of the board before retiring from active business a few months later, returning to his native Nova Scotia where he died in August 1930 at the age of 72. In 1936, United Dry Docks, Inc. changed its name to United Shipyards, Inc.

In June 1938, United Shipyards was purchased by the Bethlehem Shipbuilding Corporation for the sum of approximately $9,320,000. The various facilities of United Shipyards were renamed by the new proprietors, with the former Morse plant redesignated as Bethlehem Brooklyn 56th Street. Bethlehem Shipbuilding continued to utilize the plant in its established role as a ship conversion and repair facility for more than two decades. Due to declining profitability, the yard was finally closed and its operations consolidated at Bethlehem's Hoboken Shipyard in 1963.
